= And I Feel Fine... The Best of the I.R.S. Years 1982–1987 =

2006 compilation album by R.E.M.

Greatest hits album by R.E.M.
- Released: September 11, 2006
- Recorded: April 15, 1981 – September 14, 1987
- Genre: Alternative rock
- Length: 78:00; 154:33 (Deluxe Edition)
- Label: EMI/I.R.S. Records
- Producers: Mitch Easter, Don Dixon, Joe Boyd, Don Gehman, Scott Litt & R.E.M.

R.E.M. chronology
Around the Sun (2004)	And I Feel Fine... The Best of the I.R.S. Years 1982–1987 (2006)	When the Light Is Mine: The Best of the I.R.S. Years 1982–1987 (2006)

R.E.M. compilations chronology
In Time: The Best of R.E.M. 1988–2003 (2003)	And I Feel Fine... The Best of the I.R.S. Years 1982–1987 (2006)	Part Lies, Part Heart, Part Truth, Part Garbage 1982–2011 (2011)

Professional ratings
Review scores
Source	Rating
AllMusic	4.5/5 stars
Blender	4/5 stars
The Encyclopedia of Popular Music	4/5 stars
Pitchfork Media	9.7/10
The Rolling Stone Album Guide	4/5 stars

And I Feel Fine... The Best of the I.R.S. Years 1982–1987 is a compilation album by American band R.E.M. It features songs from the band's years at I.R.S. Records. All tracks have been remastered, and the set was released 12 September 2006. A companion DVD, titled When the Light Is Mine, was released the same day.

And I Feel Fine is available in three versions: a standard one-disc version with 21 fan-favorite tracks spanning the Chronic Town EP (1982) to Document (1987), including every song released as a single on I.R.S. except for "Wendell Gee" and "Superman"; a second edition that adds a bonus disc, including rarities such as the single "Superman", unreleased songs, and alternate mixes; and a third edition, which combines the two-disc version with the When the Light Is Mine DVD.

"Bad Day" and "All the Right Friends" appear in outtake versions, and the final versions of these songs appear on the 2003 Warner Bros. R.E.M. compilation In Time: The Best of R.E.M. 1988–2003. The songs "Theme from Two Steps Onward" and "Mystery to Me" were previously unreleased in any form and, like the version of "Bad Day," were Lifes Rich Pageant outtakes. The band originally intended to include "Theme from Two Steps Onward" as an exclusive track on Eponymous but had lost the tape. Demo versions of all four songs recorded during the Lifes Rich Pageant sessions were released on the 25th anniversary edition of this album.

And I Feel Fine... The Best of the I.R.S. Years 1982–1987 reached #70 in the UK Albums Chart. In the U.S., each version charted separately, with the two-disc version reaching a higher peak than the single-disc version.

== Track listing ==
All songs written by Bill Berry, Peter Buck, Mike Mills and Michael Stipe except "Superman" by Gary Zekley and Mitchell Bottler.

Disc one

1. "Begin the Begin" (from Lifes Rich Pageant, 1986) – 3:29
2. "Radio Free Europe" (from Murmur, 1983) – 4:06
3. "Pretty Persuasion" (from Reckoning, 1984) – 3:51
4. "Talk About the Passion" (from Murmur, 1983) – 3:22
5. "(Don't Go Back To) Rockville" (single version) (from Reckoning, 1984) – 4:33
6. "Sitting Still" (from Murmur, 1983) – 3:18
7. "Gardening at Night" (from Chronic Town, 1982) – 3:29
8. "7 Chinese Bros." (from Reckoning, 1984) – 4:15
9. "So. Central Rain (I'm Sorry)" (from Reckoning, 1984) – 3:15
10. "Driver 8" (from Fables of the Reconstruction, 1985) – 3:23
11. "Cant Get There from Here" (single version) (from Fables of the Reconstruction, 1985) – 3:39
12. "Finest Worksong" (from Document, 1987) – 3:48
13. "Feeling Gravitys Pull" (from Fables of the Reconstruction, 1985) – 4:51
14. "I Believe" (from Lifes Rich Pageant, 1986) – 3:49
15. "Life and How to Live It" (from Fables of the Reconstruction, 1985) – 4:08
16. "Cuyahoga" (from Lifes Rich Pageant, 1986) – 4:21
17. "The One I Love" (from Document, 1987) – 3:17
18. "Welcome to the Occupation" (from Document, 1987) – 2:47
19. "Fall On Me" (from Lifes Rich Pageant, 1986) – 2:51
20. "Perfect Circle" (from Murmur, 1983) – 3:29
21. "It's the End of the World as We Know It (And I Feel Fine)" (from Document, 1987) – 4:05

Disc two

1. "Pilgrimage" (Mike's pick from Murmur, 1983) – 4:30
2. "These Days" (Bill's pick from Lifes Rich Pageant, 1986) – 3:25
3. "Gardening at Night" (slower electric demo from Reckoning sessions, 1984) – 4:44
4. "Radio Free Europe" (Hib-Tone single version, 1981) – 3:48
5. "Sitting Still" (Hib-Tone b-side version, 1981) – 3:16
6. "Life and How to Live It" (live at Muziekcentrum Vredenburg, Utrecht, Netherlands, 14 September 1987) – 6:36
7. "Ages of You" (live at the Paradise Rock Club, Boston, 13 July 1983) – 3:48
8. "We Walk" (live at the Paradise Rock Club, Boston, 13 July 1983) – 3:17
9. "1,000,000" (live at the Paradise Rock Club, Boston, 13 July 1983) – 3:25
10. "Finest Worksong" (other mix, b-side of "Finest Worksong" 12-inch single, 1987) – 3:47
11. "Hyena" (demo from Fables of the Reconstruction sessions, 1985) – 2:50
12. "Theme from Two Steps Onward" (demo from Lifes Rich Pageant sessions, 1986) – 4:37
13. "Superman" (from Lifes Rich Pageant, 1986) – 2:53
14. "All the Right Friends" (demo outtake from Murmur sessions, 1983, previously released on Dead Letter Office IRS Years reissue, 1993) – 3:53
15. "Mystery to Me" (demo from Lifes Rich Pageant sessions, 1986) – 2:01
16. "Just a Touch" (live-in-studio version recorded to two-track during Reckoning sessions, 1984) – 2:38
17. "Bad Day" (at the time called "PSA", outtake from Lifes Rich Pageant sessions, 1986) – 3:03
18. "King of Birds" (from Document, 1987) – 4:09
19. "Swan Swan H" (live acoustic version, recorded as part of the film Athens, GA: Inside Out, 1987) – 2:43
20. "Disturbance at the Heron House" (Peter's pick from Document, 1987) – 3:32
21. "Time After Time (AnnElise)" (Michael's pick from Reckoning, 1984) – 3:31

Best Buy exclusive

An exclusive Best Buy version contained a digital download card which allowed the buyer to download two bonus tracks and a bonus video:

- "Pretty Persuasion", in-studio version (from Reckoning I.R.S. Years reissue, 1992)
- "Disturbance at the Heron House", recorded live at McCabe's Guitar Shop in Santa Monica, California, May 24, 1987 (from British "The One I Love" B-side, 1987)
- "Radio Free Europe", original long-version music video (previously on Succumbs, 1987)

== Charts ==
Year	Chart	Position
2006	Billboard 200	148 Regular Edition; 116 Limited Edition
2006	Billboard Top Internet Albums	207
2006	UK Albums Chart	70 (1 week on the chart)
