= Part Lies, Part Heart, Part Truth, Part Garbage 1982–2011 =

2011 greatest hits album by R.E.M.

Greatest hits album by R.E.M.
- Released: November 11, 2011
- Recorded: 1981–2011
- Genre: Alternative rock; folk rock; college rock; jangle pop
- Length: 151:24
- Label: Warner Bros.
- Producer: Mitch Easter; Don Dixon; Joe Boyd; Don Gehman; Bill Berry; Peter Buck; Mike Mills; Michael Stipe; Scott Litt; Pat McCarthy; Jacknife Lee
- Compiler: R.E.M.

R.E.M. chronology
| Collapse into Now (2011) | Part Lies, Part Heart, Part Truth, Part Garbage 1982–2011 (2011) | Unplugged: The Complete 1991 and 2001 Sessions (2014) |

Singles from Part Lies, Part Heart, Part Truth, Part Garbage 1982–2011
- 1. "We All Go Back to Where We Belong" Released: October 18, 2011

R.E.M. compilations chronology
| And I Feel Fine... The Best of the I.R.S. Years 1982–1987 (2006) | Part Lies, Part Heart, Part Truth, Part Garbage 1982–2011 (2011) |

Part Lies, Part Heart, Part Truth, Part Garbage 1982–2011 is a 2011 greatest hits album from alternative rock band R.E.M. Intended as a coda on their career, this is the first compilation album that features both their early work on independent record label I.R.S. Records in addition to their 10 studio releases through Warner Bros. Records. The double-disc retrospective was released through Warner Bros. on November 11, 2011, and was compiled by the band members; the existence of the compilation was revealed simultaneously with the group's announcement that they were disbanding on September 21, 2011.

== Creation and compilation ==
In addition to previously recorded music that spans the band's entire career, three new songs are included. Their final studio album—Collapse into Now—fulfilled the band's contractual obligations to Warner Bros. and they began recording material without a contract a few months later with producer Jacknife Lee in Athens, Georgia with the possible intention of self-releasing the work. Rather than completing an album's worth of material, the band elected to take what they had completed from those sessions and release them on this compilation. The new songs "Hallelujah" and "A Month of Saturdays" were demoed in the Collapse into Now sessions and the lead single "We All Go Back to Where We Belong" was recorded entirely after that album.

The band compiled the contents themselves, attempting to capture different periods of their songwriting. Vocalist Michael Stipe has explained that the inspiration for his approach to compiling the songs was the David Bowie compilation Changesonebowie. The title of the album comes from a quip that guitarist Peter Buck made about the band during an interview in 1988, "R.E.M is part lies, part heart, part truth and part garbage."

== Promotion ==
"We All Go Back to Where We Belong" was made available over the Internet on October 17, 2011. Early reviews of the song considered it a "low-key, string-drenched ballad" (Stereogum) and compared it to the pop styling of Burt Bacharach and R.E.M.'s 2001 album Reveal.

In the weeks leading up to the release of the compilation, Mike Mills and Michael Stipe did a brief span of promotional appearances in British media, ruling out the option of ever reuniting, while Buck went on tour with John Wesley Harding and The Minus 5. The band previewed the new songs through NPR's web site starting November 6, 2011.

== Reception ==
Professional ratings
Aggregate scores
| Source | Rating |
|---|---|
| Metacritic | 87/100 |
Review scores
| Source | Rating |
| AllMusic | 4/5 stars |
| Consequence of Sound | 4.5/5 stars |
| Drowned in Sound | 8/10 |
| Entertainment Weekly | B |
| The Independent | 5/5 stars |
| The Phoenix | 2/4 stars |
| Pitchfork | 9.4/10 |
| PopMatters | 9/10 stars |
| Rolling Stone | 4.5/5 stars |
| Slant Magazine | 3.5/5 stars |

According to the review aggregator Metacritic, Part Lies, Part Heart, Part Truth, Part Garbage 1982–2011 received "universal acclaim" based on a weighted average score of 87 out of 100 from 19 critic scores. Writing for BBC Music, Paul Whitelaw has called the retrospective "definitive", rendering all the band's other compilations "all but obsolete." He goes on to say that the arc of the band's career shows them becoming increasingly mild and irrelevant, but this album captures that chronology. Andy Gill of The Independent disagreed and gave the album a perfect five-star rating, saying that the arc of the band's songwriting had "inspired creativity" including the "Bacharach-esque touches of the final unreleased tracks."

== Track listing ==
All tracks written by Bill Berry, Peter Buck, Mike Mills and Michael Stipe unless otherwise noted.

Disc one

1. "Gardening at Night" – 3:29 (from Chronic Town, 1982)
2. "Radio Free Europe" – 4:03 (from Murmur, 1983)
3. "Talk About the Passion" – 3:21 (from Murmur)
4. "Sitting Still" – 3:17 (from Murmur)
5. "So. Central Rain (I'm Sorry)" – 3:15 (from Reckoning, 1984)
6. "(Don't Go Back To) Rockville" – 4:32 (from Reckoning)
7. "Driver 8" – 3:23 (from Fables of the Reconstruction, 1985)
8. "Life and How to Live It" – 4:06 (from Fables of the Reconstruction)
9. "Begin the Begin" – 3:28 (from Lifes Rich Pageant, 1986)
10. "Fall on Me" – 2:50 (from Lifes Rich Pageant)
11. "Finest Worksong" – 3:48 (from Document, 1987)
12. "It's the End of the World as We Know It (And I Feel Fine)" – 4:05 (from Document)
13. "The One I Love" – 3:17 (from Document)
14. "Stand" – 3:12 (from Green, 1988)
15. "Pop Song 89" – 3:04 (from Green)
16. "Get Up" – 2:39 (from Green)
17. "Orange Crush" – 3:52 (from Green)
18. "Losing My Religion" – 4:28 (from Out of Time, 1991)
19. "Country Feedback" – 4:09 (from Out of Time)
20. "Shiny Happy People" – 3:46 (from Out of Time)
21. "The Sidewinder Sleeps Tonite" – 4:07 (from Automatic for the People, 1992)

Disc two

1. "Everybody Hurts" – 5:17 (from Automatic for the People)
2. "Man on the Moon" – 5:13 (from Automatic for the People)
3. "Nightswimming" – 4:16 (from Automatic for the People)
4. "What's the Frequency, Kenneth?" – 4:00 (from Monster, 1994)
5. "New Test Leper" – 5:26 (from New Adventures in Hi-Fi, 1996)
6. "Electrolite" – 4:05 (from New Adventures in Hi-Fi)
7. "At My Most Beautiful" (Buck, Mills, Stipe) – 3:35 (from Up, 1998)
8. "The Great Beyond" (Buck, Mills, Stipe) – 5:06 (from Man on the Moon, 1999)
9. "Imitation of Life" (Buck, Mills, Stipe) – 3:57 (from Reveal, 2001)
10. "Bad Day" – 4:05 (from In Time: The Best of R.E.M. 1988–2003, 2003)
11. "Leaving New York" (Buck, Mills, Stipe) – 4:49 (from Around the Sun, 2004)
12. "Living Well Is the Best Revenge" (Buck, Mills, Stipe) – 3:11 (from Accelerate, 2008)
13. "Supernatural Superserious" (Buck, Mills, Stipe) – 3:23 (from Accelerate)
14. "Überlin" (Buck, Mills, Stipe) – 4:15 (from Collapse into Now, 2011)
15. "Oh My Heart" (Buck, Mills, Stipe, Scott McCaughey) – 3:21 (from Collapse into Now)
16. "Alligator_Aviator_Autopilot_Antimatter" (Buck, Mills, Stipe) – 2:45 (from Collapse into Now)
17. "A Month of Saturdays" (Buck, Mills, Stipe) – 1:40 (previously unreleased)
18. "We All Go Back to Where We Belong" (Buck, Mills, Stipe) – 3:35 (previously unreleased)
19. "Hallelujah" (Buck, Mills, Stipe) – 3:42 (previously unreleased)

iTunes Store bonus music videos

1. "Radio Free Europe" – 3:11
2. "Talk About the Passion" – 3:21
3. "Fall On Me" – 2:59
4. "The One I Love" – 3:17
5. "Orange Crush" – 3:50
6. "Losing My Religion" – 4:45
7. "Man on the Moon" – 4:46
8. "What's the Frequency, Kenneth?" – 4:01
9. "All the Way to Reno (You're Gonna Be a Star)" – 4:22
10. "Leaving New York" – 4:43
11. "Supernatural Superserious" – 3:39
12. "Überlin" – 3:53

== Personnel ==
R.E.M.

- Bill Berry – drums; percussion; backing vocals; bass guitar on "Country Feedback"; writing; production on "Gardening at Night", "Finest Worksong", "It's the End of the World as We Know It (And I Feel Fine)", "The One I Love", "Stand", "Pop Song 89", "Get Up", "Orange Crush", "Losing My Religion", "Country Feedback", "Shiny Happy People", "The Sidewinder Sleeps Tonite", "Everybody Hurts", "Nightswimming", "What's the Frequency, Kenneth?", "New Test Leper", and "Electrolite"; liner notes
- Peter Buck – electric and acoustic guitars; mandolin; electric sitar on "Gardening at Night"; banjo on "Electrolite"; writing; production on "Gardening at Night", "Finest Worksong", "It's the End of the World as We Know It (And I Feel Fine)", "The One I Love", "Stand", "Pop Song 89", "Get Up", "Orange Crush", "Losing My Religion", "Country Feedback", "Shiny Happy People", "The Sidewinder Sleeps Tonite", "Everybody Hurts", "Nightswimming", "What's the Frequency, Kenneth?", "New Test Leper", "Electrolite", "At My Most Beautiful", "The Great Beyond", "Imitation of Life", "Bad Day", "Leaving New York", "Living Well Is the Best Revenge", "Supernatural Superserious", "Überlin", "Oh My Heart", "Alligator_Aviator_Autopilot_Antimatter", "A Month of Saturdays", "We All Go Back to Where We Belong", and "Hallelujah"; liner notes
- Mike Mills – bass guitar; piano; keyboards; backing vocals; organ on "Country Feedback", "Shiny Happy People" and "New Test Leper"; arrangement on "Losing My Religion"; writing; production on "Gardening at Night", "Finest Worksong", "It's the End of the World as We Know It (And I Feel Fine)", "The One I Love", "Stand", "Pop Song 89", "Get Up", "Orange Crush", "Losing My Religion", "Country Feedback", "Shiny Happy People", "The Sidewinder Sleeps Tonite", "Everybody Hurts", "Nightswimming", "What's the Frequency, Kenneth?", "New Test Leper", "Electrolite", "At My Most Beautiful", "The Great Beyond", "Imitation of Life", "Bad Day", "Leaving New York", "Living Well Is the Best Revenge", "Supernatural Superserious", "Überlin", "Oh My Heart", "Alligator_Aviator_Autopilot_Antimatter", "A Month of Saturdays", "We All Go Back to Where We Belong", and "Hallelujah"; liner notes
- Michael Stipe – vocals; writing; production on "Gardening at Night", "Finest Worksong", "It's the End of the World as We Know It (And I Feel Fine)", "The One I Love", "Stand", "Pop Song 89", "Get Up", "Orange Crush", "Losing My Religion", "Country Feedback", "Shiny Happy People", "The Sidewinder Sleeps Tonite", "Everybody Hurts", "Nightswimming", "What's the Frequency, Kenneth?", "New Test Leper", "Electrolite", "At My Most Beautiful", "The Great Beyond", "Imitation of Life", "Bad Day", "Leaving New York", "Living Well Is the Best Revenge", "Supernatural Superserious", "Überlin", "Oh My Heart", "Alligator_Aviator_Autopilot_Antimatter", "A Month of Saturdays", "We All Go Back to Where We Belong", and "Hallelujah"; liner notes

Additional musicians

- Shamarr Allen – trumpet on "Oh My Heart"
- David Arenz – violin on "Shiny Happy People"
- Ellie Arenz – violin on "Shiny Happy People"
- Denise Berginson-Smith – violin on "The Sidewinder Sleeps Tonight", "Everybody Hurts", and "Nightswimming"
- Mark Bingham – string arrangements on "Shiny Happy People"
- David Braitberg – violin on "Shiny Happy People"
- Andy Carlson – violin on "Electrolite"
- Andrew Cox – cello on "Shiny Happy People"
- Nathan December – guiro on "Electrolite"
- Lommie Ditzen – violin on "The Sidewinder Sleeps Tonight", "Everybody Hurts", and "Nightswimming"
- Patti Gouvas – violin on "The Sidewinder Sleeps Tonight", "Everybody Hurts", and "Nightswimming"
- George Hanson – conductor on "The Sidewinder Sleeps Tonight", "Everybody Hurts", and "Nightswimming"
- Reid Harris – viola on "Shiny Happy People", "The Sidewinder Sleeps Tonight", "Everybody Hurts", and "Nightswimming"
- Peter Holsapple – acoustic guitar on "Losing My Religion" and "Shiny Happy People"
- John Paul Jones – orchestral arrangements on "The Sidewinder Sleeps Tonight", "Everybody Hurts", and "Nightswimming"
- Leroy Jones – trumpet on "Oh My Heart"
- Ralph Jones – double bass on "Shiny Happy People"
- Kirk M. Joseph Sr. – sousaphone on "Oh My Heart"
- Lenny Kaye – guitar on "Alligator_Aviator_Autopilot_Antimatter"
- John Keane – pedal steel guitar on "Country Feedback"
- Kathleen Kee – cello on "The Sidewinder Sleeps Tonight", "Everybody Hurts", and "Nightswimming"
- Dave Kempers – violin on "Shiny Happy People"
- Daniel Laufee – cello on "The Sidewinder Sleeps Tonight", "Everybody Hurts", and "Nightswimming"
- Scott McCaughey – guitar, keyboards, backing vocals, accordion
- Elizabeth Murphy – cello on "Shiny Happy People", "The Sidewinder Sleeps Tonight", "Everybody Hurts", and "Nightswimming"
- Paul Murphy – viola on "Shiny Happy People", "The Sidewinder Sleeps Tonight", "Everybody Hurts", and "Nightswimming"
- Heidi Nitchie – viola on "The Sidewinder Sleeps Tonight", "Everybody Hurts", and "Nightswimming"
- Peaches – vocals on "Alligator_Aviator_Autopilot_Antimatter"
- Bill Rieflin – drums, bouzouki, keyboards, guitar
- Kate Pierson – vocals on "Shiny Happy People"
- Sandy Salzinger – violin on "The Sidewinder Sleeps Tonight", "Everybody Hurts", and "Nightswimming"
- Sou-Chun Su – violin on "The Sidewinder Sleeps Tonight", "Everybody Hurts", and "Nightswimming"
- Judy Taylor – violin on "The Sidewinder Sleeps Tonight", "Everybody Hurts", and "Nightswimming"
- Deborah Workman – oboe on "The Sidewinder Sleeps Tonight", "Everybody Hurts", and "Nightswimming"

Technical personnel

- Chris Bilheimer – art design
- Joe Boyd – production on "Driver 8" and "Life and How to Live It"
- Don Dixon – production on "Radio Free Europe", "Talk About the Passion", "Sitting Still", "So. Central Rain (I'm Sorry)", and "(Don't Go Back To) Rockville"
- Don Gehman – production on "Begin the Begin" and "Fall On Me"
- Mitch Easter – production on "Gardening at Night", "Radio Free Europe", "Talk About the Passion", "Sitting Still", "So. Central Rain (I'm Sorry)", and "(Don't Go Back To) Rockville"
- Jacknife Lee – production on "Living Well Is the Best Revenge", "Supernatural Superserious", "Überlin", "Oh My Heart", "Alligator_Aviator_Autopilot_Antimatter", "A Month of Saturdays", "We All Go Back to Where We Belong", and "Hallelujah"
- Scott Litt – production on "Finest Worksong", "It's the End of the World as We Know It (And I Feel Fine)", "The One I Love", "Stand", "Pop Song 89", "Get Up", "Orange Crush", "Losing My Religion", "Country Feedback", "Shiny Happy People", "The Sidewinder Sleeps Tonite", "Everybody Hurts", "Nightswimming", "What's the Frequency, Kenneth?", "New Test Leper", and "Electrolite"
- Pat McCarthy – production on "At My Most Beautiful", "The Great Beyond", "Imitation of Life", "Bad Day", and "Leaving New York"
- Jay Weigel – orchestral liaison on "Shiny Happy People"

== Charts and certifications ==
=== Weekly charts ===
Chart performance for Part Lies, Part Heart, Part Truth, Part Garbage 1982–2011
| Chart (2011) | Peak position |
|---|---|
| Australia (ARIA) | 71 |
| Austria (Ö3) | 20 |
| Belgium (Flanders) (Ultratop 50) | 8 |
| Belgium (Wallonia) (Ultratop) | 20 |
| Canada (CANOE) | 79 |
| Czech Republic (IFPI) | 31 |
| Denmark (Tracklisten) | 13 |
| France (SNEP) | 114 |
| Germany (Media Control) | 15 |
| Ireland (IRMA) | 16 |
| Italy (FIMI) | 7 |
| Netherlands (MegaCharts) | 14 |
| Norway (VG-lista) | 25 |
| Poland (ZPAV) | 37 |
| Spain (PROMUSICAE) | 18 |
| Sweden (Sverigetopplistan) | 39 |
| Switzerland (Hitparade) | 17 |
| United Kingdom (OCC) | 19 |

=== Certifications ===
Certifications for Part Lies, Part Heart, Part Truth, Part Garbage 1982–2011
| Region | Certification | Certified units/sales |
|---|---|---|
| Ireland (IRMA) | Gold | 7,500^{^} |
| Italy (FIMI) | Gold | 30,000^{*} |
| United Kingdom (BPI) | Gold | 100,000^{^} |
^{*} Sales figures based on certification alone.^{^} Shipments figures based on certification alone.
