= Eponymous (album) =

Album by R.E.M.

Greatest hits album by R.E.M.
- Released: October 17, 1988
- Recorded: 1981–1987
- Genre: Alternative rock
- Length: 43:06
- Label: I.R.S.
- Producer: Joe Boyd; Don Dixon; Mitch Easter; Don Gehman; Scott Litt; R.E.M.

R.E.M. chronology
Succumbs (1987)	Eponymous (1988)	Green (1988)

R.E.M. compilations chronology
Dead Letter Office (1987)	Eponymous (1988)	The Best of R.E.M. (1991)

Professional ratings
Review scores
Source	Rating
AllMusic	4.5/5 stars
Robert Christgau	A−
The Encyclopedia of Popular Music	4/5 stars
Q	4/5 stars
The Rolling Stone Album Guide	4.5/5 stars

Eponymous is the first greatest hits album by the American alternative rock band R.E.M., released in 1988. It was their last authorized release on I.R.S. Records, to whom they had been contracted since 1982, having just signed with Warner Bros. Records.

Eponymous includes several alternative versions of songs, including the soundtrack contribution "Romance", which had not previously appeared on an R.E.M. record. Spanning from the initial single release of "Radio Free Europe" to the previous year's breakthrough hit album Document, Eponymous provides a fair overview of R.E.M.'s early work.

The album features the alternate title "File Under Grain", a reference to the cover photograph. A previous album, Document, had "File Under Fire" inscribed on it, and Reckoning featured the words "File Under Water". On the reverse of the LP cover is a photograph of singer Michael Stipe with the words "They Airbrushed My Face" above his head. The photo is the senior portrait taken of Stipe while at Collinsville High School in Collinsville, Illinois. It appears in the Class of 1978 high school year book. The "doodles" on the front cover are the work of Stipe. He asked Tom Laune, the engineer at Ardent Studios in Memphis, Tennessee, to photocopy them and make them larger.

Released in October 1988, just a month before R.E.M.'s Warner Bros. debut Green appeared, Eponymous reached #44 in the US and #69 in the UK.

== Track listing ==
All songs written by Bill Berry, Peter Buck, Mike Mills and Michael Stipe:

Side one – "Early"

1. "Radio Free Europe" (original Hib-Tone single) (1981) – 3:47
2. "Gardening at Night" (different vocal mix)^{1} – 3:30
3. "Talk About the Passion" (from Murmur, 1983) – 3:20
4. "So. Central Rain" (from Reckoning, 1984) – 3:15
5. "(Don't Go Back To) Rockville" (from Reckoning, 1984) – 4:32
6. "Cant Get There from Here" (from Fables of the Reconstruction, 1985) – 3:39

Side two – "Late"

1. "Driver 8" (from Fables of the Reconstruction, 1985) – 3:23
2. "Romance" (from soundtrack album to the 1987 film Made in Heaven) – 3:25
3. "Fall on Me" (from Lifes Rich Pageant, 1986) – 2:50
4. "The One I Love" (from Document, 1987) – 3:16
5. "Finest Worksong" (mutual drum horn mix) (from "Finest Worksong" single) – 3:50
6. "It's the End of the World as We Know It (And I Feel Fine)" (from Document, 1987) – 4:05

Notes

- ^{1} Different mix from version on Chronic Town.

== Charts ==
Chart performance for Eponymous
Chart (1988)	Peak position
Australian Albums (ARIA)	29
New Zealand Albums (RMNZ)	16
UK Albums Chart	69
US Billboard 200	44
