= Dead Letter Office (album) =

Compilation album by R.E.M.
- Released: April 27, 1987
- Recorded: 1981–1986
- Genre: Alternative rock
- Length: 43:22
- Label: I.R.S.
- Producer: Mitch Easter; Don Dixon; Joe Boyd; Don Gehman; R.E.M.

R.E.M. chronology
Lifes Rich Pageant (1986)	Dead Letter Office (1987)	Document (1987)

R.E.M. compilations chronology
Dead Letter Office (1987)	Eponymous (1988)

Dead Letter Office is a rarities and B-sides collection by R.E.M., released in April 1987. The album is essentially a collection of many additional recordings R.E.M. made from before Murmur to Lifes Rich Pageant that were outtakes or released as B-sides to their singles internationally. Many of the tracks are favorite cover versions indicating the band's disparate influences and musical tastes, including three Velvet Underground covers, and songs by Aerosmith ("Toys in the Attic"), Roger Miller ("King of the Road"), and fellow Athenians Pylon ("Crazy").

Guitarist Peter Buck composed wry, self-deprecating (and, in one instance, apologetic) liner notes to the songs on the album. Buck initially had doubts about releasing it, saying he felt as though people would perceive the album as the band "trying to cash in, maybe to sell some records", as the ultimate release date predated that of the band's final studio album with I.R.S., Document, by a mere four months.

The album was initially issued as a 15-song collection on vinyl and cassette, but when its CD edition appeared the five tracks from the band's 1982 Chronic Town EP were added. This was the only CD availability of Chronic Town until the release of The Originals box set.

== Critical reception ==
Professional ratings
Review scores
Source	Rating
AllMusic	3.5/5 stars
Robert Christgau	C+
The Encyclopedia of Popular Music	3/5 stars
The Great Rock Discography	7/10
Kerrang!	3.75/5
Record Mirror	3.5/5 stars
Rolling Stone	Favorable
The Rolling Stone Album Guide	4.5/5 stars
Spin Alternative Record Guide	4/10

Reviewing Dead Letter Office for Rolling Stone, Jimmy Guterman described it as a "clearinghouse" for outtakes, covers and B-sides that should not alienate those who dislike it because it would not interrupt R.E.M.'s regular release schedule. He enjoyed Dead Letter Office for being the band's loosest and least ambitious album, as well as "the first R.E.M. record wholly without pretension". Less favorably, The Village Voice's Robert Christgau quipped: "Peter Buck describes these B sides and outtakes as 'a junkshop.' Dumpster would be more like it. You can throw away a Velvets cover or three without anybody getting hurt, but bad Pylon gives unsuspecting young people the wrong idea."

Among British reviewers, Kerrang!'s Howard Johnson deemed it a collection of "out-takes, piss-takes and mis-takes, an intriguing insight into the history of a class band." He particularly praised the choice of Aerosmith cover and concluded that although the album isn't to be taken seriously, "maybe these days there's a real place in the business for music for pleasure!" In his NME review, Danny Kelly commented that the 15 tracks are "the detritus of R.E.M.'s four years as the greatest non-noise rock band on the face of the planet", describing the material as "an invaluable set of chicken bones, clues (but only clues) to the mystery of R.E.M.'s divinity." He nonetheless said that while the album would be fascinating for devoted fans, curious newcomers should hear Murmur (1983) or Lifes Rich Pageant (1986) first. Later in 1987, Kelly deemed the compilation "an undoubted indulgence, but, given that R.E.M. attract a following of the most devoted, addicted, kind, perhaps a necessary one."

In a retrospective review, Stephen Thomas Erlewine of AllMusic commented that Dead Letter Office "sums up all of the quirks and idiosyncrasies that made R.E.M. the leading underground guitar pop band of the '80s." While believing that few of the songs are among the band's best work, he considers the album "extremely entertaining, even for casual fans", for how it "captures the wild spirit of R.E.M. that was evident at their concerts, but not always on their records." Similarly, Ira Robbins and Brad Reno of Trouser Press wrote that the "curious and amusing" B-sides/rarities compilation spotlights the band's "proclivity" for cover versions and "a goofy sense of humor not often heard on their albums." Ultimate Classic Rock reflected that the release of such a collection was a surprise from the anti-commercial R.E.M. and confounded expectations, but that its content "happily exceeded" them, adding that instead of being a "hastily assembled cash grab," the collection "opened a window" into both R.E.M.'s in-studio creative process and "sometimes surprising influences".

In an Uncut guide to R.E.M.'s work, Andrew Mueller described Dead Letter Office as a "rag-and-bone wagon" that disproved that R.E.M. "could do no wrong", but nonetheless praised it as a companion to the main discography "that functions as a kind of Rosetta Stone for deciphering a band who had, up to that point, made a virtue of their opacity." He notes that it formally acknowledges R.E.M.'s influences, "from art school, to AM radio, to the heritage of their hometown of Athens, Georgia." In The New Rolling Stone Album Guide (2004), Tom Narwocki commented that the compilation demonstrated that "even in its throwaway efforts, R.E.M. had more ideas than most bands could put into an entire album", noting that while not great, "Dead Letter Office is an enjoyable trip through a terrific band's most lighthearted moments", with the CD version even more invaluable for the Chronic Town material. Eric Weisbard of the Spin Alternative Record Guide (1995) called it "a half-assed outtake collection”, lamenting that it was the only available place to hear the "gorgeously slight" Chronic Town. Pitchfork critic Michael Idov praises the album for its "drunken studio fuckery".

== Legacy ==
Singer Thom Yorke of Radiohead recalls listening to Dead Letter Office and the Smiths' Strangeways, Here We Come (1987) in a girl's bedroom in Oxford and both groups becoming "important bands" to him, adding: "There's this weird way music gets imprinted on your heart." In 2011, Pitchfork's Stephen M. Deusner noted that Dead Letter Office had consistently remained a fan favorite because of its "ramshackle" vibe. Spin ranked it 16th in their ranking of R.E.M. albums, saying: "The album is a revealing, often charmingly unpolished and lighthearted look behind the curtain at R.E.M., at a time when they were considered a mysterious and even humorless band."

== Track listing ==
All songs written by Bill Berry, Peter Buck, Mike Mills and Michael Stipe except where noted.

Post side

1. "Crazy" (Randy Bewley, Vanessa Briscoe, Curtis Crowe, Michael Lachowski) – 3:03 (B-side of "Driver 8" 7-inch single and "Wendell Gee" 7- and 12-inch singles)
2. "There She Goes Again" (Lou Reed) – 2:50 (B-side of I.R.S. "Radio Free Europe" 7-inch single)
3. "Burning Down" – 4:12 (B-side of "Wendell Gee" 7 and 12-inch singles)
4. "Voice of Harold"^{1} – 4:24 (B-side of "So. Central Rain" 12-inch single)
5. "Burning Hell" – 3:49 (B-side of "Cant Get There from Here" 12-inch single)
6. "White Tornado" – 1:55 (recorded on the same day as the "Radio Free Europe" single in 1981; an alternate version served as the B-side of "Superman" 7 & 12-inch singles)
7. "Toys in the Attic" (Steven Tyler, Joe Perry) – 2:28 (B-side of "Fall on Me" 12-inch singles)

Script side

8. "Windout" (Jeremy Ayers, Berry, Buck, Mills, Stipe) – 1:58 (from Bachelor Party soundtrack)
9. "Ages of You" – 3:42 (B-side of "Wendell Gee" 7- and 12-inch singles)
10. "Pale Blue Eyes" (Reed) – 2:53 (B-side of "So. Central Rain" 12-inch single)
11. "Rotary Ten" – 2:00 (B-side of "Fall on Me" 7-inch single)
12. "Bandwagon" (Berry, Buck, Mills, Lynda Stipe, M. Stipe) – 2:16 (B-side of "Cant Get There from Here" 7- and 12-inch singles)
13. "Femme Fatale" (Reed) – 2:49 (B-side of "Superman" 12-inch single)
14. "Walters [sic] Theme"^{2} – 1:32 (B-side of "So. Central Rain" 7-inch single)
15. "King of the Road"^{2} (Roger Miller) – 3:13 (B-side of "So. Central Rain" 7-inch single)

CD bonus tracks (Chronic Town EP)

16. "Wolves, Lower" – 4:10
17. "Gardening at Night" – 3:29
18. "Carnival of Sorts (Box Cars)" – 3:54
19. "1,000,000" – 3:06
20. "Stumble" – 5:40

=== The IRS Years reissue ===
On January 26, 1993, EMI (which owns the I.R.S. catalogue) re-released Dead Letter Office in Europe with two bonus tracks:

21. "Gardening at Night" (acoustic version) – 3:53
22. "All the Right Friends"^{3} – 3:53

Notes

- ^{1} Features the backing track of "7 Chinese Bros." (from Reckoning) with Stipe's singing the liner notes from the back cover of a gospel album The Joy of Knowing Jesus by The Revelaires.
- ^{2} Buck says "Walter's Theme" and "King of the Road" were recorded extemporaneously during a recording session while the band was drunk. The songs were recorded at the end of a tryout session with Elliot Mazer in 1983 before the recording of Reckoning. In "Walter's Theme", Stipe refers to the Pere Ubu song "Lonesome Cowboy Dave" ("I got a hat the size of Oklahoma!"); "King of the Road" consists mostly of Stipe's fumbling through the lyrics ("I'm a man, a man by no means") as Buck and Mills try to arrive at the same key (both can be heard yelling chord names at each other).
- ^{3} This version is a previously unissued studio outtake as recorded for Murmur, as listed on And I Feel Fine... The Best of the I.R.S. Years 1982–1987. The band recorded this song again during the sessions for Reckoning (this version remains unreleased), again for consideration on Fables of the Reconstruction (that version was issued as a bonus track on a later re-issue of the album), and yet again for the soundtrack of Vanilla Sky.

== Charts ==
=== Weekly charts ===
Chart (1987)	Peak position
US Billboard 200	52
UK Albums (OCC)	60

=== Single ===
Year	Single	Chart	Peak position
1987	"Ages of You"	Billboard Mainstream Rock Tracks	39

== See also ==
- Athens, GA: Inside Out (1987), archive footage
