= When the Light Is Mine: The Best of the I.R.S. Years 1982–1987 =

Video by R.E.M.
- Released: September 12, 2006
- Genre: Alternative rock
- Label: I.R.S.

R.E.M. chronology
And I Feel Fine... The Best of the I.R.S. Years 1982–1987 (2006)	When the Light Is Mine: The Best of the I.R.S. Years 1982–1987 (2006)	R.E.M. Live (2007)

R.E.M. video chronology
Perfect Square (2004)	When the Light Is Mine: The Best of the I.R.S. Years 1982–1987 (2006)	R.E.M. Live (2007)

When the Light Is Mine: The Best of the I.R.S. Years 1982–1987 is a DVD featuring videos by the rock band R.E.M. during its tenure with I.R.S. Records from 1982 to 1987. It was released in the United States on September 12, 2006, to coincide with the release of And I Feel Fine: The Best of the I.R.S. Years 1982-1987, a compilation album featuring selections from the band's I.R.S. back catalogue.

The DVD's title is a lyric line from one of the band's songs, "Feeling Gravitys Pull", off their 1985 album Fables of the Reconstruction. The DVD features the band's I.R.S. videos, plus some unreleased concert footage and some rare footage from their performances on such shows as The Tube.

Extras on the DVD include acoustic performances of "Driver 8," "Wendell Gee," "Time After Time (AnnElise)" and "(Don't Go Back To) Rockville" from the band's 1983 and 1984 appearances on The Cutting Edge. Also included are excerpts from a series of video interviews designed to promote Lifes Rich Pageant.

== Video listing ==
All songs written by Bill Berry, Peter Buck, Mike Mills and Michael Stipe. Directors in parentheses.

1. "Wolves, Lower" (Jonathan Dayton and Valerie Faris, shot 1982 at Club Lingerie, Hollywood)
2. "Radio Free Europe" (edit version) (Arthur Pierson, shot 13–14 May 1983 in Rev. Howard Finster's "Paradise Garden", Summerville, GA)
3. "Talk About the Passion" (Jem Cohen, shot 1983 on the streets of New York City)
4. "Radio Free Europe" (live on The Tube, 18 November 1983) (Gavin Taylor, shot at Tyne Tees Studios, Newcastle upon Tyne)
5. "Talk About the Passion" (live on The Tube, 18 November 1983) (Gavin Taylor, shot at Tyne Tees Studios, Newcastle upon Tyne)
6. "So. Central Rain (I'm Sorry)" (Howard Libov, shot December 1983 at Reflection Studios, Charlotte, NC)
7. Left of Reckoning (20-minute film by James Herbert, shot May 1984 at artist Ruben A. Miller's Whirligig Farm in Rabbittown, outside Gainesville, GA)
8. "Pretty Persuasion" (live on The Old Grey Whistle Test, 20 November 1984) (Tom Corcoran, shot at BBC Studios, London)
9. "Can't Get There From Here" (Michael Stipe & Aguar Video Productions, shot summer 1985 in and around Athens, GA)
10. "Driver 8" (original long version) (James Herbert & Michael Stipe, narrated by Michael Stipe, shot summer 1985 in Clifton Forge, VA, and in James Herbert's studio, Athens, GA)
11. "Life and How To Live It" (James Herbert, shot fall 1985)
12. "Feeling Gravitys Pull" (James Herbert, shot fall 1985)
13. "Can't Get There From Here" (live on The Tube, 25 October 1985) (Gavin Taylor, shot at Tyne Tees Studios, Newcastle upon Tyne)
14. "Fall On Me" (Michael Stipe, shot 1986)
15. "Swan Swan H" (live acoustic from the film Athens, GA: Inside/Out) (Tony Gayton, shot 1986 in the Lucy Cobb Chapel, Athens, GA)
16. "The One I Love" (Robert Longo, shot 1987 in and around Athens, GA)
17. "It's the End of the World as We Know It (And I Feel Fine)" (James Herbert, shot Summer 1987 in Athens, GA)
18. "Finest Worksong" (Michael Stipe, shot late 1987 in Athens, GA)

== Extras ==
I. The Cutting Edge, October 1983 (Jonathan Dayton and Valerie Faris, shot June 1983 in Echo Park)

- Edited Broadcast Segment
- Additional Interviews

II. The Cutting Edge, June 1984 (Jonathan Dayton and Valerie Faris, hosted by Peter Zaremba, shot 1984 at the I.R.S. Records offices, Los Angeles)

- Edited Broadcast Segment
- Additional Interviews
- Live Performances:
1. "Driver 8"
2. "Wendell Gee"
3. "(Don't Go Back To) Rockville"
4. "Time After Time (AnnElise)"

III. Pageantry (promotional interview excerpts with Peter Buck and Mike Mills, shot September 1986)

== Audio tracks ==
- Main Menu Audio: "Old Man Kensey" (Jerry Ayers, Berry, Buck, Mills, Stipe) (Instrumental Edit, June 2006)
- Selection Submenu Audio (page one): "Theme from Two Steps Onward" (Instrumental Edit, June 2006)
- Selection Submenu Audio (page two): "Rotary Ten"
- Extras Submenu Adio: "Life and How to Live It" (Intro Edit, June 2006)
- Credit Scroll Audio: "Pilgrimage"
