= The Athens Demos =

The Athens Demos is the name of two compilations of demos recorded by R.E.M. and included as bonus discs with re-releases of their albums:

- Fables of the Reconstruction (originally released in 1985, re-released in 2010)
- Lifes Rich Pageant (originally released in 1986, re-released in 2011)
