= Ages of You =

Song by R.E.M

- Promotional 7" single

Single by R.E.M.

from the album Dead Letter Office
- Released: 1987
- Recorded: December 1983
- Genre: Alternative rock
- Length: 3:39
- Label: I.R.S.
- Songwriters: Bill Berry; Peter Buck; Mike Mills; Michael Stipe
- Producers: Mitch Easter; Don Dixon

"Ages of You" is a song by the band R.E.M. from their album Dead Letter Office. It was one of the early songs the group wrote.

== Song information ==
The song rose from another early R.E.M. song "Burning Down." According to guitarist Peter Buck, as recounted on the Dead Letter Office liner notes: "When we got tired of ['Burning Down'], we kept the two pieces that we liked and rewrote the rest to come up with 'Ages of You'. We got tired of that one, also."

It was intended to be a track on the band's EP Chronic Town, but producer Mitch Easter felt it let down the track list—"Gardening at Night", "Carnival of Sorts (Box Cars)", "1,000,000", and "Stumble". Easter felt that the song "Wolves, Lower" was a better song in the context of the EP.

The song was re-recorded during sessions for the band's 1984 album Reckoning, but was left off the album and later relegated to B-side status, appearing on the 7- and 12-inch versions of the single "Wendell Gee" in 1985, remixed by engineer Steve Fjelstad (as noted on the Dead Letter Office liner notes.)

Both "Ages of You" and its "companion piece" (as Buck called it), "Burning Down" (also remixed by Fjelstad), were featured on the aforementioned Dead Letter Office B-side compilation album in 1987. The ending of the Dead Letter Office version differs slightly from the original 7" version, editing the applause into the track at the end. A live version recorded at the Paradise Theater in Boston, Massachusetts on July 13, 1983, originally released on the compilation album Live! for Life can be found on the second disc in the special collector's edition version of And I Feel Fine: The Best of the I.R.S. Years, a 2006 compilation of the band's I.R.S. Records work.

== Track listing ==
U.S. 7" single

1. "Ages of You" – 3:39

== Charts ==
Chart (1987)	Peak position
US Mainstream Rock Tracks (Billboard)	39
