= Wayne Jernigan =

American businessperson (1941–2026)

- Born: Errol Wayne Jernigan; September 27, 1941; Sumter, South Carolina, U.S.
- Died: March 28, 2026 (aged 84); Charlotte, North Carolina, U.S.
- Resting place: Evergreen Memorial Park Cemetery, Sumter, North Carolina, U.S.

Errol Wayne Jernigan (September 27, 1941 – March 28, 2026) was an American businessman and former musician. He was known for establishing Reflection Sound Studios in Charlotte, North Carolina, in 1969. Over its 45 years in existence, it was used by several notable artists, including Whitney Houston and James Brown.

== Early life ==
Jernigan was born in 1941 in Sumter, South Carolina, to Woodrow Wilson Jernigan and Sarah Elizabeth Brannon. He attended Edmunds High School.

== Career ==
As a drummer, Jernigan worked with country singer Ernest Tubb between 1968 and 1970 as a member of the Texas Troubadours. In the middle of this stint, he established a recording studio at 2315 South Boulevard in Charlotte, North Carolina.

In 1974, Jernigan moved Reflection to 1018 Central Avenue. He purchased the building in 1978. R.E.M. recorded their first two albums―Murmur (1983) and Reckoning (1984)―and the video to "So. Central Rain (I'm Sorry)", a single from Reckoning, at Reflection. Both albums were produced by Don Dixon and Mitch Easter. Dixon was the producer there for 43 of its 45 years. Other artists who recorded at Reflection include Whitney Houston, James Brown, Tammy Faye Baker and the Spongetones.

In 2014, after 45 years in business, a 72-year-old Jernigan sold the Reflection building and retired from the industry. An earlier planned sale in 2007, to a group of investors, fell through (after Jernigan had made the studio staff redundant), so Jernigan kept the studio going as long as he could, hoping a "vibrant eatery" would fill the space. The building was demolished in August 2014.

== Personal life ==
Jernigan's time on the road with Ernest Tubb put a strain on his marriage, hence his decision that the couple move from Nashville, Tennessee, to his wife's hometown of Charlotte. The marriage eventually ended, but he had a son and two daughters with his ex-wife.

He played tennis and was an athlete in his early years, and later developed a love for woodworking.

After retiring, Jernigan bought Little Horse Island, near Beaufort, South Carolina, where he worked to preserve the landscape and oversaw the island's Carolina Marsh Tacky.

== Death ==
Jernigan died in 2026, aged 84. He was interred in Evergreen Memorial Park Cemetery in Sumter.
