= Sound of Superman =

Compilation album by various artists
- Released: June 13, 2006
- Recorded: Throughout 2005 and early 2006
- Genre: Alternative rock
- Length: 51:00
- Label: Rhino / WEA

Professional ratings
Review scores
Source	Rating
AbsolutePunk	21% link

Sound of Superman is a companion album to the soundtrack of the Warner Bros. film, Superman Returns. It features performances both original and cover by various up and coming artists, as well as established ones, including the final track on the album performed by Sara Routh, the sister of the actor portraying Superman in the film, Brandon Routh. All the songs on the album are based either on the character of Superman himself, or at the basic concept of what a hero really is. None of the songs actually appear in the film, although "The Rescue" was featured in a TV spot for Superman Returns and the cover track on this album of "Superman" was used to introduce the three main cast members at the 2006 MTV Movie Awards.

This album preceded the actual score of the film, composed by John Ottman. That album was released two weeks later, on June 27, 2006. It is not the first time that this concept has been explored in the superhero genre of film. In 1989, Batman did the same, and achieved great success with both albums.

It was rated three stars by AllMusic.

== Track listing ==
1. "Superman" - The Academy Is... (The Clique/R.E.M. cover) – 2:31
2. "It's So Easy" - Plain White T's – 3:06
3. "(Wish I Could Fly Like) Superman" - The Sun (The Kinks cover) – 3:01
4. "The Worst Part..." - Motion City Soundtrack – 4:17
5. "Sunshine Superman" - The Films (Donovan cover) – 3:19
6. "Save Me" - Maxeen – 3:21
7. "My Hero" - Paramore (Foo Fighters cover) – 3:46
8. "The Rescue" - American Hi-Fi – 3:17
9. "Saved" - The Spill Canvas – 4:15
10. "Meet Me At My Window" - Jack's Mannequin – 3:49
11. "Waitin' for a Superman" - Nightmare of You (The Flaming Lips cover) – 4:03
12. "Superman" - The Receiving End of Sirens (Stereophonics cover) – 4:46
13. "Brainiac's Daughter" - Royal (The Dukes of Stratosphear cover) – 3:21
14. "You're Never Gone" - Sara Routh – 4:00
