= Gardening at Night =

Song by R.E.M

Song by R.E.M.

from the EP Chronic Town
- Released: August 24, 1982
- Studio: Drive-In, Winston-Salem, North Carolina, United States
- Genre: Alternative rock; college rock; jangle pop
- Length: 3:29
- Label: I.R.S.
- Songwriters: Bill Berry; Peter Buck; Mike Mills; Michael Stipe
- Producers: Mitch Easter; R.E.M.

"Gardening at Night" is a song by American rock band R.E.M. It was recorded for the band's 1982 debut EP Chronic Town.

== Writing ==
The song is said to have been written on a mattress in the front yard of the Oconee Street church in Athens, Georgia. At that point in the band's career, Peter Buck has stated that their musical modus operandi was "three chords and a six-pack of beer."

In the booklet of the 2006 And I Feel Fine... The Best of the I.R.S Years 1982–1987, Bill Berry wrote the following of "Gardening at Night":

We were driving at night after a show (I don't remember where), and I was at the wheel of our old car, with a rental trailer in tow. One of my three passengers aimed a directive at me. Rather than inform me of his desire to evacuate his bladder, he instead suggested that I pull over so that he might engage in the task of roadside 'night gardening.' To four guys in their early twenties this was a glaring catalyst for a new song.

The song's title served as the inspiration for the name of the band's publishing company Night Garden Music. According to lead singer Michael Stipe: "[Some people think the lyrics] are about my father, some people think they're about drugs, and some people think they're about gardening at night. They're about all of them."

== Versions ==
Four different studio recordings of the song have been officially released. The original Chronic Town version can be found on the CD edition of Dead Letter Office, on the 2006 R.E.M. compilation And I Feel Fine: The Best of the I.R.S. Years 1982-1987 and more recently in the band's 2011 career-spanning greatest hits compilation Part Lies, Part Heart, Part Truth, Part Garbage 1982–2011. A version featuring an earlier vocal take appears on the 1988 compilation Eponymous. An acoustic version of the song appears as a bonus track on the European "I.R.S. Vintage Years" reissue of Dead Letter Office. A substantially slower electric version of the song appears on the bonus disc accompanying the special collector's edition of And I Feel Fine.

Six live versions have been officially released–the first, recorded on July 13, 1983, appeared on the Dutch "I.R.S. Years" reissue of the band's debut album Murmur. The second appeared as a B-side of the 12-inch "(Don't Go Back To) Rockville" single in 1984. The third appeared on a promotional CD called The Alternative Radio Sampler. A performance at Larry's Hideaway, Toronto, Ontario, from July 9, 1983, was released on the 2008 Deluxe Edition reissue of Murmur. A performance from Chicago's Aragon Ballroom from July 7, 1984 was released on the 2009 Deluxe Edition reissue of Reckoning. Finally, a performance from the band's 2007 rehearsal tour in Ireland was released on the Live At The Olympia In Dublin album.

R.E.M. performed the song at their 2007 induction into the Rock and Roll Hall of Fame. Singer Michael Stipe dedicated the song to his father. Stipe also mentioned that the band considered this their first "real" composition after 20 or 30 presumably failed efforts.

== Personnel ==
Personnel taken from Chronic Town’s 2022 reissue liner notes.

R.E.M.

- Bill Berry – drums, maracas
- Peter Buck – electric guitar, acoustic guitar, electric sitar
- Mike Mills – bass guitar
- Michael Stipe – vocals

== See also ==
- Lotion (EP) – "Gardening Your Wig" interpolates this song and Hüsker Dü's "Flip Your Wig"
