= Philomath, Georgia =

Unincorporated community in Georgia, U.S.

Philomath
- Unincorporated community
- Interactive map of Philomath
- Coordinates: 33°43′38″N 82°59′29″W
- Country: USA
- State: Georgia
- County: Oglethorpe County
- Elevation: 646 ft (197 m)

Philomath is an unincorporated community located in the southeastern corner of Oglethorpe County, Georgia, United States at an elevation of 646 feet (197 m).

== History ==
The area of Philomath was first called Woodstock in the 1790s and was briefly the county seat during that decade. It experienced a population decline after the move, but started to be settled again circa 1829. The nearest post office was a stage coach stop between Atlanta and Augusta about four miles away. The people of Woodstock wanted their own post office. When the approval for one came, the name had to be changed because there was another Woodstock in Georgia.

The city was home to an all-boys boarding school, Reid Academy, to which boys came from all over the South to attend. The school was known throughout the state as one of the finest educational institutions of its time. Robert Toombs and Alexander Stephens were frequent visitors to the city and often made speeches at the school. Stephens suggested that the city’s name should be changed to Philomath which means a place of learning, because the school was such an important aspect to the community. Much of the early history of Philomath was centered on the Academy. The school buildings were eventually torn down and replaced with a one-story building, which was used as a community school until recent years when the students began to be transported to larger schools. The building was then converted into a community center.

Philomath is mentioned in the 1985 R.E.M. song "Cant Get There from Here", with singer Michael Stipe singing the lines "If you're needing inspiration, Philomath is where I go by dawn” and “Philomath they know the low-down.” However, Stipe claims he's never been there. The liner notes for the band's Eponymous compilation album identify Philomath as "located between Lexington and Crawfordville and used to have its own post office."

Philomath is mentioned in John McPhee's essay "Travels in Georgia" which appeared in the collection "Pieces of the frame". At the time of that writing (1973), Philomath's zip code was 30659.

Philomath is also the home of The Big Eye Huntry Club and The Campbell Toe Ranch.

== Historical buildings ==
- A large number of cotton plantations were laid out in and around Philomath, the oldest of which is called "The Globe".
- A Presbyterian church was erected circa 1840, which still stands.
- On one plantation, there is a clay pit (called the Great Buffalo Lick) which was used by the Cherokee and Creek peoples as a boundary to transfer land to the state of Georgia during James Wright's term as governor. There was more recently an attempt to register the above mentioned Buffalo Lick as a Georgia Natural Area. Many Native American trails run through this land. William Bartram, a biological scientist, traveled through this area in his study of the plant life of the region.

== The Parting of Soldiers ==
Philomath was the location of the final breaking up of the Confederate government east of the Mississippi. President Davis and his cabinet separated in Washington, Georgia because they thought it was best for him to travel inconspicuously. His cabinet met at the home of Captain John J. Daniel. General Breckinridge and General Duke, who were bodyguards to President Davis in his flight from Richmond, were in command. It was decided that it was a "needless expenditure of blood to continue the struggle and the Stars and Bars of the late Confederacy were forever furled." The last counsel of war took place in the parlor of the Globe and the generals and other officers dined with Captain Daniel. The parting addresses were delivered from the porch after the soldiers received their small paychecks and departed for their homes.
