= Reflection Sound Studios =

Recording studio in Charlotte, North Carolina

Coordinates: 35.221083°N 80.819806°W

- Type: Recording studio
- Industry: Music
- Founded: 1969
- Founder: Wayne Jernigan
- Defunct: 2014
- Fate: Closed
- Headquarters: Charlotte, North Carolina, U.S.

Reflection Sound Studios was a recording studio in Charlotte, North Carolina. Established in 1969 by Wayne Jernigan, several notable artists recorded material there, including R.E.M., Whitney Houston, James Brown, Tammy Faye Baker and the Spongetones. After 45 years in business, Jernigan, aged 72, sold the building and retired from the industry. A planned sale in 2007, to a group of investors, fell through (after Jernigan had made the studio staff redundant), so Jernigan kept the studio going as long as he could. The building was demolished in August 2014.

Its original location was at 2315 South Boulevard in Charlotte, but in 1974 Jerrigan moved the business to 1018 Central Avenue. He purchased the building four years later.

R.E.M. recorded their first two albums―Murmur (1983) and Reckoning (1984)―and the video to "So. Central Rain (I'm Sorry)", a single from Reckoning, at Reflection. Both albums were produced by Don Dixon and Mitch Easter. Dixon was the producer there for 43 of its 45 years.

Jernigan died in 2026, aged 84.
