= Gary Zekley =

American record producer and songwriter

Alan Gary Zekley (also known as Brandon Chase; January 4, 1943 – June 19, 1996) was an American West Coast record producer and songwriter associated with 1960s, 1970s, and 1980s bands and songs in the bubblegum, rock and roll, sunshine pop, and surf genres.

He co-wrote "Sooner or Later", a top-10 hit for the Grass Roots in 1971. R.E.M. recorded his song "Superman" on their 1986 album Lifes Rich Pageant. The song was originally recorded by the Clique. Zekley wrote or produced songs by bands such as Big Pig, Dick and Dee Dee, Jan and Dean, Sweathog, Spanky and Our Gang, the Ragamuffins, the Mamas & the Papas, the Fun and Games, and the Yellow Balloon, who had a 1967 Billboard #25 hit with a Zekley-penned song of the same name. Zekley produced the Yellow Balloon's eponymous album under the pseudonym Yodar Critch—taken from a statue featured in the TV show Our Miss Brooks. He died on June 19, 1996, of a heart attack at age 53 in Marina del Rey, California.

== Filmography ==
- Bill & Ted's Excellent Adventure, 1989
