= Cant Get There from Here =

1985 single by R.E.M.

Single by R.E.M.

from the album Fables of the Reconstruction
- B-side: "Bandwagon"
- Released: June 1985
- Recorded: 1985
- Studio: Livingston (London)
- Genre: Alternative rock; funk rock; jangle pop; blue-eyed soul
- Length: 3:39
- Label: IRS
- Songwriters: Bill Berry; Peter Buck; Mike Mills; Michael Stipe
- Producer: Joe Boyd

R.E.M. singles chronology
"(Don't Go Back To) Rockville" (1984)	"Cant Get There from Here" (1985)	"Driver 8" (1985)

Music video
- "Cant Get There from Here" on YouTube

"Cant Get There from Here", or "Can't Get There from Here", is the first single released by R.E.M. from its third studio album Fables of the Reconstruction in 1985. The song peaked at number 10 on the Billboard Bubbling Under Hot 100 Singles, equaling to a position of approximately 110 on the main Billboard Hot 100 chart. It also peaked at number 91 on the Canadian Singles Chart. It was re-released on the 2006 compilation disc And I Feel Fine... The Best of the I.R.S. Years 1982–1987.

It was the first R.E.M. song to feature a horn section. Matthew Perpetua's 2010 retrospective of R.E.M.'s work called it "oddball...approximated southern funk via Peter Buck's chiming Rickenbacker chords".

The song mentions the small town of Philomath, Georgia.

== Reception ==
Cash Box said that "a fully rocking chorus and a typically steady and murky verse give this cut superior pop character as well as giving mainstream listeners a taste of what college radio has known about for years."

== Music video ==
In another first for R.E.M., who had opposed including the lyrics with their albums, many of the words of "Cant Get There from Here" appeared in the video for the song.

The video features band members frolicking in hay fields, throwing popcorn at each other at a drive-in movie, and big insects. "We used the new-to-us 'blue screen' process," Buck explained to MTV UK in 2001, during An Hour with R.E.M. "So we have dinosaurs and monsters in the background. It's probably the most humorous video we've ever done. For a band that's kind of noted for not having a sense of humor, I kind of enjoy that aspect of it."

== Punctuation ==
The proper title of the song is unclear: unlike "Feeling Gravitys Pull" or Lifes Rich Pageant, this song's title does not maintain a consistent punctuation. On the album, it is spelled without an apostrophe on the back cover, but with the apostrophe on the CD. One version of the single has an apostrophe and the other does not.

On the 1988 compilation Eponymous, the song's title also is spelled without an apostrophe, except in the liner notes. The title has an apostrophe on the back cover of the 2006 compilation And I Feel Fine.

The band's U.S. copyright registration for the song includes the apostrophe.

== Cover versions ==
The punk band The Mr. T Experience recorded a frenetic cover for the 1992 R.E.M. tribute album Surprise Your Pig. It was subsequently included as a bonus track on the 1997 reissue of their earlier EP Big Black Bugs Bleed Blue Blood.

== Track listing ==
All songs written by Bill Berry, Peter Buck, Mike Mills and Michael Stipe, "Bandwagon" is co-written by Michael's sister, Lynda Stipe.

=== 7": IRS / IRM 102 (UK) ===
1. "Can't Get There from Here" (Edit) – 3:12
2. "Bandwagon" – 2:15

=== 12": IRS / IRT 102 (US) ===
1. "Can't Get There from Here" (Extended Mix) * – 3:39
2. "Bandwagon" – 2:15
3. "Burning Hell" – 3:49
- "Extended Mix" identical to album version

== Charts ==
Chart (1985)	Peak position
Canadian Hot 100	91
U.S. Billboard Bubbling Under Hot 100 Singles	110
U.S. Billboard Top Rock Tracks	14
