= Begin the Begin =

Song by R.E.M,

Song by R.E.M.

from the album Lifes Rich Pageant
- Released: July 28, 1986
- Studio: Belmont Mall (Belmont, Indiana)
- Genre: Alternative rock; hard rock
- Length: 3:28
- Label: I.R.S.
- Songwriters: Bill Berry; Peter Buck; Mike Mills; Michael Stipe
- Producer: Don Gehman

"Begin the Begin" is the first song on R.E.M.'s fourth album, Lifes Rich Pageant. Lead singer Michael Stipe has called it "a song of personal, political activism." Though never released as a single, it appeared frequently in the band's live performances as a song early in the set. It was even used as an opening song in the live performances at their inductions into the Georgia Music Hall of Fame and the Rock and Roll Hall of Fame. The song was also included as the first track on their 2006 compilation And I Feel Fine... The Best of the I.R.S. Years 1982-1987.

As the opening track on Lifes Rich Pageant, the song heralded a new clarity in Stipe's vocals. Written on acoustic guitars in Stipe's home, the original version of the song was a minute longer, with five different choruses, lacking melody and a bridge. Replete with references to Americana and revolution, the title is a pun on Cole Porter's "Begin the Beguine".
