= The Clique (American band) =

Sunshine pop band

The Clique was a late-1960s American sunshine pop band from Austin, Texas. They started as the Roustabouts in the Beaumont, Texas, area, 90 miles east of Houston, and later the Sandpipers before renaming themselves the Clique in 1967 and settling in Houston. Original members of the band were John Kanesaw (drums), Bruce Tinch (bass guitar), Cooper Hawthorne (lead guitar), Larry Lawson (vocals and keyboards), David Dunham (vocals and horns), and Randy Shaw (vocals and horns).

Their first hit was a cover of the 13th Floor Elevators's "Splash 1", on Cinema Records, produced by Walt Andrus. The song was No. 1 in Houston for several weeks. The Clique were signed to Scepter Records, New York, for two years following their hit "Splash 1". During this period, Cooper Hawthorne and Larry Lawson left the group and were replaced by Bill Black (guitar and backing vocals) and Sid Templeton (keys, guitar and backing vocals). John Kanesaw, Bruce Tinch, and Bill Black left thereafter and were replaced by Jerry Cope (drums), Tom Pena (bass), and Oscar Houchins (keys and backing vocals). The group drew attention from the West Coast. They consisted of Tom Pena (bass), Sid Templeton (guitar and backing vocals), Jerry Cope (drums), and Oscar Houchins (keys and backing vocals). David Dunham (sax and backing vocals) and lead singer Randy Shaw were the only two original members at the time the group signed with White Whale Records (label mates with the Turtles). The group became centered on record producer/songwriter Gary Zekley. Their self-titled album, The Clique (1969), released by White Whale Records, featured the singles "I'll Hold Out My Hand" and "Sugar on Sunday", which reached No. 45 in the US on December 13, 1969 and No. 22 in the US on October 18, 1969 Billboard Hot 100 chart, respectively. "Sugar on Sunday" was a cover of a Tommy James song and its B-side, "Superman", was covered by R.E.M. on their 1986 album Lifes Rich Pageant and later in 1997 by Roger Troutman. In Canada "Sugar on Sunday" was No. 20 on October 11 and "I'll Hold Out My Hand" reached No. 23 on December 27.

The Clique reached No. 177 on the Billboard Top LP's album chart. A 1970 single, "Sparkle and Shine", reached No. 100; this song is included, along with six other added songs, on the 1998 Varèse Sarabande re-release of The Clique. The Clique performed on several national television shows, including John Byner's "Something Else" and "The Dating Game". The group toured nationally appearing with popular acts of the day, including Tommy James and The Shondells, Grand Funk Railroad, Brooklyn Bridge, and The Dave Clark Five.

The Gulf Coast Music Hall of Fame inducted the band in 2008, prompting a brief reunion.
