= Chronic Town =

EP by R.E.M.
- Released: August 24, 1982
- Recorded: October 1981, January & June 1982
- Studio: Drive-In, Winston-Salem, North Carolina, United States
- Genre: Jangle pop; folk rock; garage rock
- Length: 20:26
- Label: I.R.S.
- Producer: Mitch Easter; R.E.M.

R.E.M. chronology
| Chronic Town (1982) | Murmur (1983) |

Chronic Town is the debut extended play (EP) by the American alternative rock band R.E.M. It was released on August 24, 1982, on I.R.S. Records. The five-track EP was recorded at Drive-In Studio in Winston-Salem, North Carolina, in October 1981, eighteen months after the formation of the band. Its co-producer, Mitch Easter, produced the band's "Radio Free Europe" single earlier in 1981.

Chronic Town's opening track, "Wolves, Lower", was re-recorded in June 1982, two months before the EP's release. The title of the EP is part of the lyric to "Carnival of Sorts (Boxcars)", the third track on the release, and the name of the first side of the EP. "Poster Torn", also a lyric in "Carnival of Sorts (Boxcars)", is the name of side two.

== Background and recording ==
After the minor success of the group's debut single "Radio Free Europe" in 1981, R.E.M. manager Jefferson Holt felt the band was ready to record a longer release. While he felt they were not ready to record a full album, Holt thought an EP would be satisfactory. The band was uncertain at first if they would record with producer Mitch Easter (who had produced "Radio Free Europe"), but Easter managed to convince Holt and the band to let him produce it.

In October 1981, R.E.M. spent a weekend at Easter's Drive-In Studio, in Winston-Salem, North Carolina, recording the EP. Easter was a fan of the electronic band Kraftwerk, which inspired him to try various sonic experiments while recording. "I was a bit more comfortable with them," says Easter. "So I threw in suggestions involving tape loops and backward sounds, and they loved it all." Easter recorded singer Michael Stipe singing outdoors. "There were a lot of bugs out there," remembered Easter. "Whenever that 'house in order' part comes up, I think you can hear tons of crickets."

The band was open to such experimentation and used the sessions as an opportunity to learn how to use a studio. At the time of R.E.M.'s stint at the Drive-In, "the set-up was really simple," Easter said in 1994. "I had almost nothing in the studio back then, except a tape machine and a console and two compressors and one delay device. We couldn't do any fancy stuff."

Easter continued: "I remember Chronic Town completely fondly because it was so relaxed, and so open to cutting the tape up and putting pieces in backwards and stuff. There were some fireworks one night, so we went and sat on the roof for four hours and watched the fireworks instead of working on the record—because we could, you know?"

R.E.M. intended to release the EP on a proposed independent record label named Dasht Hopes run by Holt and his business partner David Healy, who funded three days of recording at the Drive-In. However, the band's demo had caught the attention of I.R.S. Records. The label signed the group to a record deal, working it out of its contracts with Healy and Hib-Tone, the indie label which released "Radio Free Europe". I.R.S. heads Jay Boberg and Miles Copeland III felt the proposed track listing was weakened by the song "Ages of You" and "Jazz Lips", and felt "Wolves, Lower" was a better choice. However, the pair felt the original take of the song was too fast. The band re-recorded "Wolves, Lower" with Easter in June 1982 in a quick recording session.

During his time in Athens, Michael Lachowski, of Pylon, ran an answerphone service known as the Athens Party Telephone. Its initialism, A.P.T., was used in the lyric to "Stumble".

== Packaging ==
The album's front cover features an image of the Stryge gargoyle from Notre-Dame Cathedral.

== Release ==
I.R.S. released Chronic Town in August 1982 as its first American issue. Reaction to the EP varied; one I.R.S. radio promoter said that many of his contacts at campus radio did not know what to make of the record, but added, "The Georgia stations and some of the more together college stations across the country jumped on it." The band filmed its first music video for "Wolves, Lower" to promote the record. The EP sold 20,000 copies in its first year.

== Reception ==
Professional ratings
Review scores
| Source | Rating |
|---|---|
| AllMusic | 3.5/5 stars |
| Robert Christgau | A− |
| The Encyclopedia of Popular Music | 3/5 stars |

I.R.S.'s Jay Boberg said of Chronic Town: "The thing that made me play the cassette again and again was that it kept getting better. It was not the kind of thing you listened to once or twice, casually, and said, 'Oh my God! This is tremendous!' It had a depth to it."

NME reviewer Richard Grabel wrote, "Chronic Town is five songs that spring to life full of immediacy and action and healthy impatience. Songs that won't be denied." Grabel praised the songs' auras of mystery, and concluded, "R.E.M. ring true, and it's great to hear something as unforced and cunning as this." Creem writer Robot A. Hull began his review saying, "This EP is so arcane that I had to play it six times in a row to get a handle on it – and even now, I'm still not sure." Hull praised the EP for "[evoking] the music of the late-'60s without any pretensions, mingling past and present to shape both into concurrent moments." Hull concluded, "Despite its eccentricity, R.E.M.'s record is undoubtedly the sleeper EP of the year."

Chronic Town ranked second in the EP category of the Village Voice Pazz & Jop critics' poll in 1982.

== Track listing ==
All songs written by Bill Berry, Peter Buck, Mike Mills and Michael Stipe.

Side one – "Chronic Town"

1. "Wolves, Lower" – 4:10
2. "Gardening at Night" – 3:29
3. "Carnival of Sorts (Boxcars)" – 3:54

Side two – "Poster Torn"

1. "1,000,000" – 3:06
2. "Stumble" – 5:40

== Personnel ==
Personnel taken from the 2022 reissue CD booklet.

R.E.M.

- Bill Berry – drums, backing vocals, maracas on "Gardening at Night", timbales on "Stumble"
- Peter Buck – electric guitar, acoustic guitar and electric sitar on "Gardening at Night"
- Mike Mills – bass guitar, backing vocals, synthesizer (calliope sound) on "Carnival of Sorts (Boxcars)"
- Michael Stipe – vocals

Production

- Greg Calbi – mastering at Sterling Sound, New York City, United States
- Mitch Easter – production, engineering, tape loops
- Kako .n. – graphics
- Curtis Knapp – cover photography
- R.A. Miller – artwork
- R.E.M. – production
- Ron Scarselli – design

== Release history ==
The EP was added to the CD edition of the band's rarities compilation album Dead Letter Office (1987), and again in 1993 in the I.R.S. Vintage Years edition of the compilation. In 2014, it was digitally remastered solely for online purchase from select high-resolution digital music stores. It is also available on analog formats such as LP and cassette.

It was bundled together with Murmur and Reckoning in the United Kingdom as The Originals in 1995. The EP also saw a standalone CD reissue on August 19, 2022, featuring liner notes written by producer Mitch Easter, marking the first CD release of the EP not tied to a compilation.

For Record Store Day 2010, held on April 17 of that year, participating independent record stores sold a limited-edition and individually-numbered blue vinyl 12" reissue of the long-out-of-print EP.

Chronic Town

| Region | Date | Label | Format | Catalog |
|---|---|---|---|---|
| United States | August 24, 1982 | I.R.S. | EP | 44797-0502-1 |
| United States | August 24, 1982 | I.R.S. | Cassette tape | SP-70502 |
| Greece | 1982 | Illegal | EP | ILP 26097 |
| Worldwide | 1990 | A&M | LP | 70502 |
| Worldwide | 1990 | I.R.S. | EP | 44797-0502-4 |
| United States, Canada, United Kingdom | 2022 | I.R.S. | CD | B0035613-02 |
| Europe | 2022 | I.R.S. | CD | 00602445736416 |

Dead Letter Office

| Region | Date | Label | Format | Catalog |
|---|---|---|---|---|
| United Kingdom | April 27, 1987 | I.R.S. | LP | 44797-0054-1 |
| United Kingdom | April 27, 1987 | I.R.S. | CD | 44797-0054-2 |
| United States | April 28, 1987 | I.R.S. | CD | 70054 |
| Worldwide | 1990 | A&M | CD | 70054 |
| Worldwide | 1990 | I.R.S. | Cassette | 44797-0054-4 |
| The Netherlands | 1993 | EMI | CD | 0777 7 13199 2 1† |
| Worldwide | 1994 | A&M | CD | 195 |

Note †I.R.S. Vintage Years edition, with bonus tracks

The Originals

| Region | Date | Label | Format | Catalog |
|---|---|---|---|---|
| United Kingdom | 1995 | I.R.S./EMI | CD box set | 7243 8 35088 2 2 |

== Works cited ==
- Black, Johnny (June 1, 2004), Reveal: The Story of R.E.M. (Paperback) (First ed.), Backbeat, ISBN 0-87930-776-5
- Buckley, David (October 2002), R.E.M.: Fiction: An Alternative Biography (Hardback) (First ed.), Virgin, ISBN 1-85227-927-3
