= Fables of the Reconstruction =

1985 album by R.E.M.

Studio album by R.E.M.
- Released: June 10, 1985
- Recorded: February–April 1985 (Note: Liner notes list "March 1985" as the recording period.)
- Studio: Livingston (London)
- Genres: Jangle pop; folk rock; alternative country; psychedelic folk; Southern rock
- Length: 39:44
- Label: I.R.S.
- Producer: Joe Boyd

R.E.M. chronology
| Reckoning (1984) | Fables of the Reconstruction (1985) | Lifes Rich Pageant (1986) |

Singles from Fables of the Reconstruction
- 1. "Cant Get There from Here" Released: June 1985; 2. "Driver 8" Released: September 1985; 3. "Wendell Gee" Released: September 1985

Fables of the Reconstruction (or Reconstruction of the Fables) is the third studio album by the American alternative rock band R.E.M. It was released on June 10, 1985, through I.R.S. Records. It was the band's first album recorded outside of the United States, with sessions taking place at Livingston Studios in London with producer Joe Boyd. The record displays a darker, murkier sound than its predecessors, with lyrics drawing from Southern Gothic themes and characters. The album also utilizes more varied instrumentation, including string and brass arrangements and banjo.

Critical reception to Fables of the Reconstruction was positive, with many reviews noting its folk elements and murky tone. Retrospectively, it has also been viewed as a transitional album, retaining the sound and obscure themes of the band's early work while hinting at the experimentation with acoustic instrumentation that would be present on their later albums. The album's sales reflected R.E.M.'s growing popularity, with it becoming their second album to reach the top 30 in the United States and first to make the top 40 in the UK. It was later certified Gold by the RIAA in 1991. While none of its singles achieved mainstream chart success, "Driver 8" has since become one of R.E.M.'s best-known and most-covered songs from their early period.

== Production ==
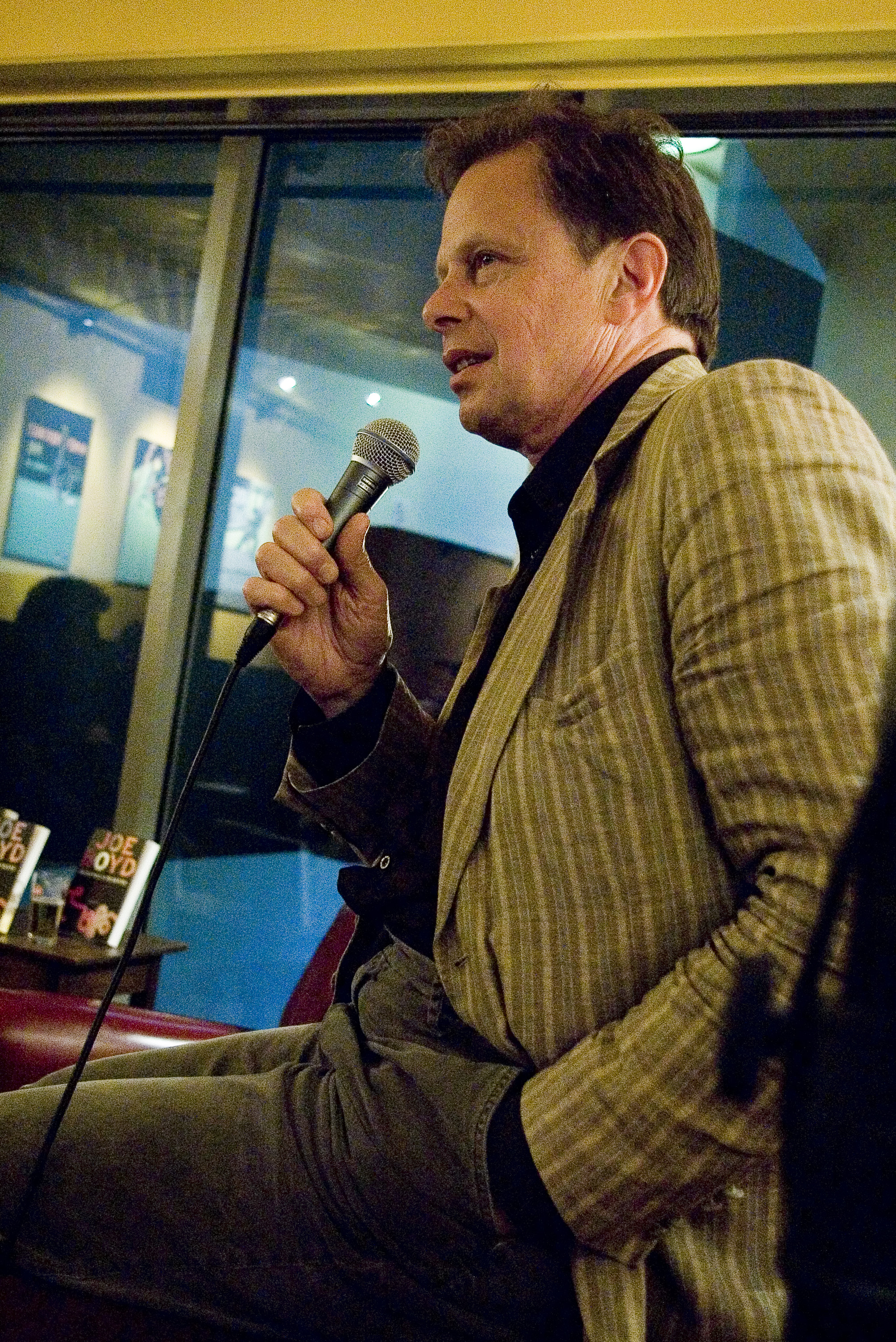
Joe Boyd (pictured in 2008) was hired as the album's producer thanks to his prior work with folk rock artists.

After working with Don Dixon and Mitch Easter on their first two albums, Murmur (1983) and Reckoning (1984), (Note: The band also co-produced Chronic Town (1982), their debut EP, with Easter.) R.E.M. decided to work with a different producer for their next album. Those considered to produce the album included Van Dyke Parks, Hugh Padgham (who had been achieving great success with his work with acts such as the Police and Genesis), Elliot Mazer (known for working with Neil Young), and Elvis Costello. Parks was lead vocalist Michael Stipe's first choice; Parks had recently released the album Jump! (1984), which was based on the Uncle Remus folk tales which had been popular in the Southern United States during the post-Reconstruction era, and thus Stipe felt that Parks would be the right fit for the Southern Gothic-influenced material he was writing at the time.

The band ultimately chose to work with London-based producer Joe Boyd. Guitarist Peter Buck, particularly, wanted to work with Boyd, known for his work with folk rock acts such as Nick Drake, Fairport Convention, and Richard and Linda Thompson. After having recorded their first two albums in North Carolina, the band instead flew to England to record the album at Livingston Studios in Wood Green, London. Conditions were less than ideal, as the band had a long commute from their lodging in Mayfair to the studio and London was at the tail end of a rough winter; Buck recalled that "It rained every day it wasn't snowing". Boyd's work ethic reportedly caused tensions with the band, as his precise attention to detail contrasted with the more spontaneous approach the band had utilized on the previous two albums. Dixon and Easter had worked quickly and encouraged the band to experiment; in contrast, Boyd spent hours mixing and remixing songs, which the band felt removed some of the energy and spontaneity of their performances.

Boyd would later describe the recording period as "not the best time in my life", but recalled that "[the band] seemed to get along better than most groups I’ve worked with" even though their relationships were somewhat strained at the time. He described them as "the most well-organized, professional group of people I’ve ever encountered." He felt that R.E.M.'s approach to mixing was unique in comparison to other acts: "When you mix a record, traditionally the singer wants his voice louder, and the guitar player says, 'Turn up the guitar,' and the bass player says, 'Can’t you make the bass parts punchier?' With R.E.M., everyone wanted themselves turned down".

== Music and lyrics ==
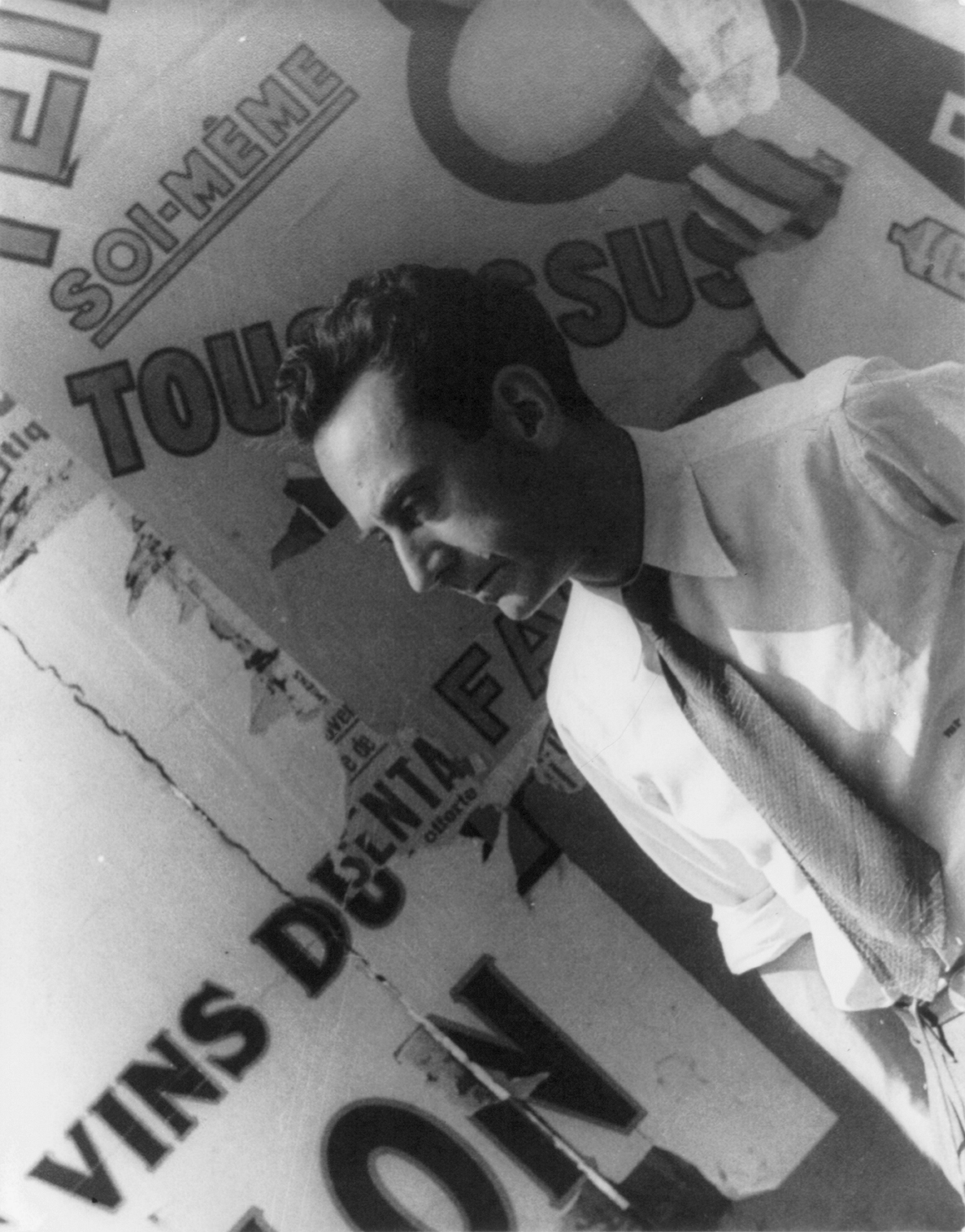
The lyrics of "Feeling Gravitys Pull" make reference to Dadaist/surrealist artist Man Ray.

Fables of the Reconstruction mixes the band's established style with folk elements and a darker sound. Writers have labeled the album as jangle pop, folk rock, alternative country, and Southern rock. Described by AllMusic's Stephen Thomas Erlewine as "creepy, rustic psychedelic folk", the album introduced new instrumentation for the band, including strings, brass, and banjo. Prior to the recording of the album, Stipe studied Appalachian music and took an interest in oral storytelling, both of which influenced the material. The combination of the album's sound and the Southern focus of its lyrics have many critics to declare Fables R.E.M.'s most "Southern" album, as well as an example of Southern Gothic. Many of its songs describe eccentric, unusual characters; Matthew Perpetua of Pitchfork described the album's aesthetic as "evok[ing] images of railroads, small towns, eccentric locals, oppressive humidity, and a vague sense of time slowing to a crawl."

Opening track "Feeling Gravitys Pull" starts with a dark, chromatic guitar riff played by Buck. The song's lyrics reference artist Man Ray and include imagery relating to lucid dreaming. The dreary tone of the song is augmented by the use of a string trio; in a review for Rolling Stone, Parke Puterbaugh described the song's cello part as "seem[ing] to drag down and halt time" and adding to its "unnerving" and "dirgelike" feel. Like many of R.E.M.'s songs, "Maps and Legends" uses bassist Mike Mills' backing vocals as counterpoint to Stipe during the chorus. Its lyrics were inspired by Howard Finster, a Baptist minister and outsider artist who had created the album art for Reckoning the previous year. Tyler Golsen of Far Out described "Driver 8" as a "classic railroad song" and a showcase for Buck's playing as both an "intricate picker" and a "folky rock star".

"Life and How to Live It" takes inspiration from a book entitled Life: How to Live by eccentric Athens–based author Brivs Mekis. Mekis split his house into two distinct halves and alternated between living in the two until he died. After his death, copies of the book were found; despite these copies being made none had ever been sold or given away. "Old Man Kensey" likewise "celebrate[s] an eccentric individual living in the Deep South." Writing for Drowned in Sound, Andrzej Lukowski describes the song as "a nightmarish tale of a crazed old guy." Lead single "Cant Get There from Here" incorporates soul and funk influences and a horn section. Perpetua described the song as "approximated Southern funk", while Puterbaugh felt it "sets a tone of dislocation that pervades the entire record". "Green Grow the Rushes" was written as part of a pact between Stipe and 10,000 Maniacs frontwoman Natalie Merchant that both would write a song about the genocide of Native Americans; the 10,000 Maniacs song "Among the Americans", from their 1985 album The Wishing Chair, was Merchant's contribution.

"Kohoutek" features Stipe's falsetto singing. According to Lukowski, Stipe's lyrics on this song are more personal, and associate himself with the other outcast characters on the record. Tim Peacock of uDiscoverMusic describes "Auctioneer (Another Engine)" as "atypically jagged and aggressive" for the band, with its "urgent, anthemic sound" hinting at the direction the band would take with Lifes Rich Pageant the following year. Parke has described "Good Advices" (as well as "Green Grow the Rushes") as "Byrds-like balladry." Lukowski refers to its lyrics as "paranoid but strangely reassuring old time wisdom." Closing track "Wendell Gee" features Buck playing banjo; continuing the album's theme of eccentric characters, Puterbaugh considers its lyrics to be a "surreal, lachrymose fable about some back-country oddball."

== Release ==
Work on Fables of the Reconstruction finished in early April, and the album was released on June 10, 1985. The album's packaging leaves it unclear as to whether its true title is Fables of the Reconstruction or Reconstruction of the Fables, with the sleeve featuring two "front covers" each displaying one of the two titles. This extends to the record label, where side one is referred to as "a side" and displays the album name as Fables of the Reconstruction whilst side two is labeled "another side" and displays Reconstruction of the Fables.

In the US, Fables peaked at number 28 on the Billboard 200 (one spot lower than Reckoning). The album would be certified Gold by the RIAA for sales in excess of 500,000 copies on June 24, 1991. The album reached number 35 on the UK Albums Chart, making it the band's first to reach the top 40 of that chart. It was also the band's first record to chart in Canada, reaching number 40, while in New Zealand it peaked at number 29.

"Cant Get There from Here" was released as the album's lead single. While it failed to chart on the Billboard Hot 100, it did reach number 10 on the Bubbling Under Hot 100. The song achieved more success on the Billboard Top Rock Tracks chart, peaking at number 14: their highest placement on that chart at the time. Cash Box magazine described the single as having "a fully rocking chorus and a typically steady and murky verse [which gives] this cut superior pop character as well as giving mainstream listeners a taste of what college radio has known about for years." Both 7" and 12" versions of the single were released; the 7" was backed with the non-album track "Bandwagon", while the 12" version included both "Bandwagon" and another previously unreleased song, "Burning Hell", on its B-side.

"Driver 8", the album's second single, also charted on the Top Rock Tracks chart, reaching a peak of number 22. The B-side of the single included a cover of "Crazy" by fellow Athens band Pylon. "Driver 8" has become one of R.E.M.'s most-covered songs, with versions being recorded by acts including Hootie & the Blowfish and Jason Isbell. "Wendell Gee" was released as the third and final single in Europe only and became the first R.E.M. song to reach the UK Singles Chart, peaking at number 91.

== Critical reception ==
Professional ratings
Review scores
| Source | Rating |
|---|---|
| AllMusic | 4/5 stars |
| The A.V. Club | A |
| Chicago Tribune | 3/4 stars |
| Entertainment Weekly | B− |
| Pitchfork | 8.5/10 |
| Q | 4/5 stars |
| Rolling Stone | 4/5 stars |
| The Rolling Stone Album Guide | 4.5/5 stars |
| Uncut | 5/5 stars |
| The Village Voice | B+ |

Contemporary critical reception for Fables of the Reconstruction was generally positive. In a review for Rolling Stone, Parke Puterbaugh awarded the album four stars out of five, referring to it as "unretouched R.E.M. in all their rough-cut glory", and felt the band sounded "surer than they did on Reckoning". He likened the album's style to the "insular mood weaving" of Murmur. Robert Christgau declared that Boyd's production confirmed that the band's "formal frame of reference is folk rock" but that the band was able to "defeat folk rock's crippling stasis: they have a good beat, and you can boogie to them".

Retrospective reviews have also been positive. In a review for AllMusic, Erlewine states that despite finding the album to be less consistent than the band's first two, it does "demonstrate musical growth, particularly in how perfectly it evokes the strange rural legends of the South." He goes on to list "Feeling Gravitys Pull", "Maps and Legends", "Green Grow the Rushes", "Auctioneer (Another Engine)", and the first two singles as "among the group's best" songs. Scott Gordon of The A.V. Club feels that Fables is the record where R.E.M. "mastered the art of effortlessly mismatching itself from album to album, and even song to song." He also highlights the eerie atmosphere of the album, stating that songs such as "Green Grow the Rushes" and "Good Advices" "might have otherwise fit beautifully" on the band's first two records, but instead, in the context of Fables, "trade some of the band's early understatement for suspense."

Matthew Perpetua's review for Pitchfork describes the album as "overlooked and transitional", and considers it to be a "dark and murky set with a textural palette close to the muted earth tones of its packaging." Like Erlewine, he finds the album to be less consistent than its two predecessors, but still praises it as "great" and "inspired". In a review for Drowned in Sound, Lukowski refers to Fables as a "Southern Gothic masterpiece". She considers it an "infinitely detailed" album which "rewards patience", while describing it as a "dark, dissonant record". Jonathan Keefe of Slant feels that Fables is R.E.M.'s most thematically cohesive album. He considers its lyrics to not be "simply a retelling of [its] myths or a hagiography for these men", referring to the characters featured throughout the album's songs. Rather, he feels they display "pointed, thoughtful consideration of what these stories mean and, specifically, of how Stipe perceives them."

=== Band opinions ===
The members of R.E.M. have expressed varying opinions on Fables since its release. In 1987, drummer Bill Berry bluntly stated that Fables "sucked". In a Rolling Stone interview from 1991, Buck was dismissive of "Driver 8", saying, "I can write that kind of stuff in my sleep. We all can." However, Stipe, who once infamously compared the album's sound to "two oranges being nailed together", stated in the same 1991 interview that he believed Fables contained the band's strongest set of songs up to that point. Buck has since spoken positively about Fables, stating in the liner notes of the album's 25th anniversary reissue: "Over the years, a certain misapprehension about Fables of the Reconstruction has built up. For some reason, people have the impression that the members of R.E.M. don't like the record. Nothing could be further from the truth. [...] It's a personal favorite, and I'm really proud of how strange it is. Nobody but R.E.M. could have made that record."

== Track listing ==
All songs written by Bill Berry, Peter Buck, Mike Mills, and Michael Stipe, except "Old Man Kensey" by Berry, Buck, Mills, Stipe, and Jeremy Ayers.

Side one – "A side – Fables of the Reconstruction"

1. "Feeling Gravitys Pull" – 4:48
2. "Maps and Legends" – 3:10
3. "Driver 8" – 3:23
4. "Life and How to Live It" – 4:06
5. "Old Man Kensey" – 4:08

Side two – "Another side – Reconstruction of the Fables"

1. "Cant Get There from Here" – 3:39
2. "Green Grow the Rushes" – 3:46
3. "Kohoutek" – 3:18
4. "Auctioneer (Another Engine)" – 2:44
5. "Good Advices" – 3:30
6. "Wendell Gee" – 3:01

== Personnel ==
Personnel taken from Fables of the Reconstruction liner notes.

R.E.M.

- Bill Berry (credited as "WT Berry – Best Boy")
- Peter Buck (credited as "PL Buck – Ministry of Music")
- Mike Mills (credited as "ME Mills – Consolate Mediator")
- Michael Stipe (credited as "JM Stipe – Gaffer Interpreter")

Additional musicians

- Camilla Brunt – violin
- Philippa Ibbotson – violin
- David Newby – cello
- Pete Thomas – tenor saxophone
- David Bitelli – tenor and baritone saxophones
- Jim Dvorak – trumpet

Production

- Joe Boyd – production
- Jerry Boys – engineering
- Berry Clempson – audio engineering
- Tony Harris – engineering
- M. K. Johnston – photography and art

== Chart positions ==
=== Weekly charts ===
| Chart (1985) | Peak position |
|---|---|
| Canada (RPM) | 40 |
| New Zealand (RMNZ) | 29 |
| UK Albums Chart | 35 |
| US Billboard 200 | 28 |

=== Singles ===
| Year | Song | Chart | Position |
|---|---|---|---|
| 1985 | "Can't Get There from Here" | Canada (RPM) | 91 |
| 1985 | "Can't Get There from Here" | Billboard Mainstream Rock Tracks | 14 |
| 1985 | "Can't Get There from Here" | Billboard Bubbling Under Hot 100 Singles | 10 |
| 1985 | "Driver 8" | Billboard Mainstream Rock Tracks | 22 |
| 1985 | "Wendell Gee" | UK Singles Chart | 91 |

== Certifications ==
| Region | Certification | Certified units/sales |
|---|---|---|
| United Kingdom (BPI) | Silver | 60,000^ |
| United States (RIAA) | Gold | 500,000^ |
^{^} Shipments figures based on certification alone.

== Release history ==
| Region | Date | Label | Format | Catalog |
|---|---|---|---|---|
| United States | June 10, 1985 | I.R.S. | vinyl LP | IRS-5592 |
| United States | June 10, 1985 | I.R.S. | Compact Disc | IRSD-5592 |
| United States | June 10, 1985 | I.R.S. | cassette tape | IRSC-5592 |
| Canada | June 10, 1985 | I.R.S. / MCA Records | LP | IRS-5592 |
| Canada | June 10, 1985 | I.R.S. / MCA Records | Compact Disc | IRSD-5592 |
| Canada | June 10, 1985 | I.R.S. / MCA Records | cassette tape | IRSC-5592 |
| United Kingdom | June 10, 1985 | I.R.S. | LP | MIRF 1003 |
| United Kingdom | June 10, 1985 | I.R.S. | Compact Disc | MDIRF 1003 |
| United Kingdom | June 10, 1985 | I.R.S. | cassette tape | MIRFC 1003 |
| Australia | June 10, 1985 | I.R.S. / Epic | LP | ELPS 4495 |
| Australia | June 10, 1985 | I.R.S. / Epic | cassette tape | ELPC 4495 |
| The Netherlands | June 10, 1985 | I.R.S. | LP | ILP 26525 |
| The Netherlands | June 10, 1985 | I.R.S. | cassette tape | IMC 26525 |
| Greece | 1985 | Illegal | LP | ILP 26525 |
| Worldwide | 1990 | MCA | Compact Disc | 5592 |
| Worldwide | 1990 | I.R.S. | cassette tape | IRSC-5592 |
| The Netherlands | August 6, 1992 | EMI | Compact Disc | 7 13160 2 9† |
| United Kingdom | 1992 | Simply Vinyl | 180-gram LP | SVLP151 |
| Worldwide | 1998 | Capitol | Compact Disc | 93479 |
| Europe | 1998 | EMI | Compact Disc | 13160† |
| Worldwide | 1999 | I.R.S. | Compact Disc | 19016 |
| United States | 1999 | Simply Vinyl | LP | 0000151 |
| Europe | 2000 | I.R.S. | Compact Disc | 7131602† |
| United States | July 23, 2010 | I.R.S. | Compact Disc | 509996 46071 22†† |

Notes

- † I.R.S. Vintage Years edition, with bonus tracks
- †† 25th Anniversary edition, with bonus disc
