= Superman (The Clique song) =

1969 song by The Clique

Single by The Clique

from the album The Clique
- B-side: "Shadow Of Your Love"
- Released: 1969
- Genre: Psychedelic rock
- Length: 2:27
- Label: White Whale Records
- Songwriters: Gary Zekley; Mitchell Bottler
- Producer: Gary Zekley

"Superman" is a 1969 song by American psychedelic band the Clique, made more famous in 1986 when it was recorded by R.E.M. In 1997, Zapp frontman Roger Troutman also recorded a version of the song that was included on the 2002 re-release of his debut album The Many Facets of Roger.

It was written by Mitchell Bottler and Gary Zekley and originally released as the first single from The Clique's first album for White Whale Records.

== R.E.M. version ==
"Superman"

Single by R.E.M.

from the album Lifes Rich Pageant
- B-side: "White Tornado"
- Released: November 1986
- Recorded: April–May 1986
- Studio: Belmont Mall (Belmont, Indiana)
- Genre: Psychedelic rock; garage rock
- Length: 2:54
- Label: I.R.S.
- Songwriters: Gary Zekley; Mitchell Bottler
- Producer: Don Gehman

R.E.M. singles chronology
"Fall on Me" (1986)	"Superman" (1986)	"The One I Love" (1987)

R.E.M. recorded it for their fourth album, Lifes Rich Pageant. It was released as a single and received a fair amount of radio play, but did not chart on the main U.S. singles chart, though it did reach #17 on Billboard magazine's Mainstream Rock Tracks chart. Producer Don Gehman said I.R.S. Records president Miles Copeland came into the Belmont Mall Studio, where the album was being recorded, and had an issue with the band's lead singer Michael Stipe not being lead vocalist on the track, even though bassist and backing vocalist Mike Mills had been singing lead during live performances of the song up until that point.

The scratchy spoken intro is attributed to a Japanese pull-string Godzilla doll. Translated loosely from the Japanese, it says, "This is a special news report. Godzilla has been sighted in Tokyo Bay. The attack on it by the Self-Defense Force has been useless. He is heading towards the city. Aaaaaaaaagh...."

Cash Box called it "another sparing example of simplicity maximized." Rolling Stone called it "an irresistibly cheesy psychedelic grunge rocker" with "energetic treatment."

Songwriter Gary Zekley joined R.E.M. on stage during a performance at Northern Illinois University in De Kalb, Illinois, on October 21, 1986.

The R.E.M. version was played during the "Tempus, Anyone?" episode of Lois & Clark: The New Adventures of Superman. It was also used as part of the soundtrack for the movie DC League of Super-Pets (2022).

The B-side to the single, a surf rock instrumental entitled "White Tornado", was first recorded by the band in 1981. The version used on the single was recorded in January 1984, during the Reckoning sessions, but remained unreleased until "Superman."

=== Track listing ===
7"
IRS / IRM 128 (UK)

1. "Superman" (Gary Zekley/Mitchell Bottler) – 2:52
2. "White Tornado" (Bill Berry, Peter Buck, Mike Mills, Michael Stipe) – 1:56

12"
IRS / IRT 128 (UK)

1. "Superman" (Gary Zekley / Mitchell Bottler) – 2:52
2. "White Tornado" (Berry, Buck, Mills, Stipe) – 1:56
3. "Femme Fatale" (Lou Reed) – 2:50

12"
IRS / ILS 65025 5 6 (Holland)

1. "Superman" (Gary Zekley/Mitchell Bottler) – 2:52
2. "White Tornado" (Berry, Buck, Mills, Stipe) – 1:56
3. "Perfect Circle" (Berry, Buck, Mills, Stipe) – 3:30
