= Driver 8 =

1985 single by R.E.M.

Single by R.E.M.

from the album Fables of the Reconstruction
- B-side: "Crazy"
- Released: September 1985
- Recorded: 1985
- Studio: Livingston (London)
- Genre: Country rock; folk rock; jangle pop
- Length: 3:18
- Label: I.R.S.
- Songwriters: Bill Berry; Peter Buck; Mike Mills; Michael Stipe
- Producer: Joe Boyd

R.E.M. singles chronology
"Cant Get There from Here" (1985)	"Driver 8" (1985)	"Wendell Gee" (1985)

"Driver 8" is the second single from American musical group R.E.M.'s third album, Fables of the Reconstruction, released in September 1985. The song peaked at number 22 on the U.S. Billboard Mainstream Rock Tracks chart.

The song refers to the Southern Crescent, a passenger train that was operated by the Southern Railroad until 1979, and continues today (with fewer stops) as the Amtrak Crescent. The music video shows Chessie System trains running around Clifton Forge, Virginia.

Guitarist Peter Buck admitted in the liner notes for the band's 2003 compilation album In Time: The Best of R.E.M. 1988–2003 that the verse chords for the song "Imitation of Life" were unintentionally taken from the verse chords of "Driver 8."

In a Rolling Stone interview in 2009, Stipe said about his vocals: "It's like breathing – I don't think about it when I sing it. I was listening to these live tapes and thought it was a beautiful song with incredible imagery. I listen to our old albums and think, 'OK, this is where that went wrong, this is a way to improve that.' And 'Wow, that's really good. You're not the hoax you think you are.'" A harmonica was played in a mimicking fashion to sound like a train whistle.

== Reception ==
Cash Box said it is "a modulating country-folk rocker which features a thoughtful chorus hook and a soaring bridge."

In 2024, in an interview with Mike Mills, Rick Beato described the song as "mournful". Mills agreed: "Melancholic, yeah. It's about trains, and trains are already wistful and mournful and melancholic. E minor is a great sad key."

== Cover versions ==
- Driver 8 was covered by Hootie and the Blowfish in 2000 on their covers-only album Scattered, Smothered and Covered after the band performed a live version of the song with R.E.M. on the UK's TFI Friday in October 1998.
- Dennis "Cannonball" Caplinger's bluegrass instrumental cover appears on 2001's Pickin' on R.E.M.: The Bluegrass Tribute.
- Death Cab for Cutie played the song on their 2006 UK tour for the album Plans, although they have not released an official recording of it.
- Old 97's covered it on their covers-only EP Mimeograph released on July 6, 2010.
- Canadian rock band The Watchmen covered the song at the Horseshoe Tavern in Toronto on September 24, 2011, shortly after news of R.E.M.'s breakup was made public. Their version was released on the download-only live album Radar Redux.
- Indie rock band The Walkmen covered the song in August 2010 for the first season of The A.V. Club's A.V. Undercover web series.
- Santa Cruz Bicycles produced a mountain bike model called Driver 8. It was first released in 2009.
- Love Canon covered the song on their 2018 album Cover Story.
- Jason Isbell released a cover to his YouTube channel in September 2021, and is included in the album Georgia Blue.
- Toad the Wet Sprocket released a cover to streaming and on their YouTube channel in 2024.

== Track listing ==
All songs written by Bill Berry, Peter Buck, Mike Mills and Michael Stipe unless otherwise indicated.

=== 7": IRS / IRS-52678 (US) ===
1. "Driver 8" – 3:24
2. "Crazy" (Pylon) – 3:05

== Charts ==
Chart performance of "Driver 8"
Chart (1985)	Peak position
US Mainstream Rock (Billboard)	22
