= Reckoning (R.E.M. album) =

1984 studio album by R.E.M.

Studio album by R.E.M.
- Released: April 9, 1984
- Recorded: December 8, 1983 – January 16, 1984
- Studio: Reflection Sound (Charlotte, North Carolina)
- Genres: Jangle pop; alternative rock; post-punk; garage rock
- Length: 38:55
- Label: I.R.S.
- Producers: Don Dixon; Mitch Easter

R.E.M. chronology
Murmur (1983)	Reckoning (1984)	Fables of the Reconstruction (1985)

Singles from Reckoning
- 1. "So. Central Rain (I'm Sorry)" Released: May 15, 1984; 2. "(Don't Go Back To) Rockville" Released: October 16, 1984

Reckoning (alternatively titled File Under Water) is the second studio album by the American alternative rock band R.E.M., released on April 9, 1984, by I.R.S. Records. Produced by Mitch Easter and Don Dixon, the album was recorded at Reflection Sound Studios in Charlotte, North Carolina, over 16 days in December 1983 and January 1984. Dixon and Easter intended to capture the sound of R.E.M.'s live performances, and used binaural recording on several tracks. Lead singer Michael Stipe dealt with darker subject matter in his lyrics, with water-related imagery being a recurring theme on the album.

Released to critical acclaim, Reckoning reached number 27 in the United States—where it was certified gold by the Recording Industry Association of America in 1991—and peaked at number 91 in the United Kingdom.

== Background and production ==
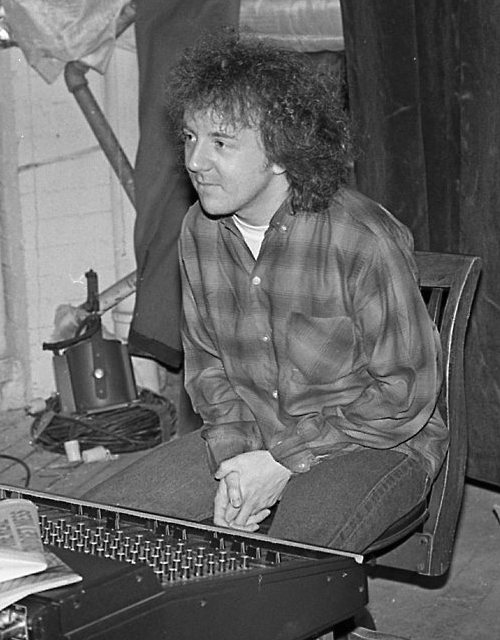
Reckoning was the band's final project with producer Mitch Easter.

After their debut album Murmur (1983) received critical acclaim, R.E.M. quickly began working on their second album. They wrote new material prodigiously, mostly in Mike Mills' living room on Barber Street in Athens, Georgia. Peter Buck recalled, "We were going through this streak where we were writing two good songs a week [...] We just wanted to do it; whenever we had a new batch of songs, it was time to record". Because of the many new songs the band had, Buck unsuccessfully tried convincing his bandmates that the group's next release should be a double album. In November 1983, the band recorded 22 songs during a session with Neil Young producer Elliot Mazer in San Francisco. While Mazer was briefly considered as a candidate to produce the band's next album, R.E.M. ultimately decided to work with Murmur producers Mitch Easter and Don Dixon again.

R.E.M. started recording Reckoning at Reflection Sound in Charlotte, North Carolina, on December 8, 1983. The group recorded over two eight-day stretches, separated by two weeks of canceled studio time that allowed the band to perform in Greensboro, North Carolina, see a movie, and shoot a video for "So. Central Rain (I'm Sorry)" in the studio. While the studio diary listed 16 days for recording, the album sleeve later claimed the album was recorded in 14 days, while in interviews, Buck sometimes stated that the album was recorded in 11 days. The producers both disputed that the sessions were that short; Dixon insisted that they were at the studio for over 25 days – during which he worked 18-hour days – while Easter said, "When I read '11 days' I thought, what the fuck! It was 20 days, which was still short, but it's not 11."

During recording, there was pressure from I.R.S. Records to try making the album more commercial. The label sent messages to Dixon and Easter, which the producers told the band that they would ignore. While the producers respected I.R.S. president Jay Boberg, they expressed dismay at the comments he made when he visited during the last day of sessions. Dixon called Boberg "record company clueless", while Easter said "I got along with Jay Boberg OK [...] but now and again he would express an opinion that would make me think, 'holy shit', because it would strike me as really teenage." Buck said he was grateful that Dixon and Easter acted as a buffer between the band and its label. He said that "it got to the point where as much as I respected the guys at I.R.S., we basically tried to record the records so they wouldn't know we were recording them!", and explained that part of the reason why R.E.M. recorded the album so quickly was that the group wanted to finish before representatives from I.R.S. showed up to listen to it.

The recording sessions were difficult for lead singer Michael Stipe, who was particularly worn out by the band's 1983 tour schedule. Getting usable vocal tracks from Stipe was difficult; Dixon recalled that he and Stipe would show up around noon each day before the rest of the band, but that "he was kind of shut down, and it was difficult to get him to open up". While recording the song "7 Chinese Bros.", Stipe sang so quietly that Dixon could not hear him on the tape. Frustrated, the producer climbed a ladder to a spot above the recording booth Stipe was in and found a gospel record titled The Joy of Knowing Jesus by the Revelaires, which he then handed to the singer in an attempt to inspire him. Stipe began reciting the liner notes from the album audibly, which enabled Dixon to move on to recording the vocal track properly. The recording of Stipe's recitation was later released as "Voice of Harold", first as a B-side to "So. Central Rain" and then on the 1987 compilation Dead Letter Office.

== Music ==
"Harborcoat"
Opening track "Harborcoat" includes the vocal interplay between Berry, Mills and Stipe as well as frenetic drumming from Berry and Buck's chiming guitar.

Dixon, Easter, and the band sought to capture the energy of R.E.M.'s live sound on Reckoning. Dixon had not seen the band perform live before working on Murmur; after having done so, he had a greater sense of the band's strengths and weaknesses. Dixon wanted Buck's guitars to sound more like they did in concert, but originally was met with resistance from both the band and the label; however, by the time recording began, Dixon said the group "wanted to rock out a bit more".

Dixon was enamored of the binaural recording technique, and used it extensively on the album. Easter recalled that Dixon "made this sort of fake binaural head out of a cardboard box and stuck two microphones in it" to record the group. In Easter's opinion, this made drummer Bill Berry's parts "fresher sounding". Binaural recording also allowed Mills' backing vocals to be louder without obscuring Stipe. Dixon explained that "Mike Mills was often singing 12 to 15 feet away from the microphones that were recording his part, but because it was in a studio binaural field, we would tend to hear him as behind [Stipe]."

Biographer David Buckley wrote of the album that "While the music moved away from Murmur's slightly airless feel, the [lyrical] subject matter was a little darker." Buck noted in a 1988 interview that water imagery was abundant in Stipe's lyrics on the album. Buckley interpreted this as representing the change presented by the band's increasing success, as well as the changing music scene of the group's hometown. The song "Camera" addresses the death of a friend from Athens who died in a car crash. Easter said, "[Stipe's] vocal was so exposed on that track, and because of that, it could really show any technical imperfections with regard to pitch." He tried to get Stipe to sing a better take, but the singer was more intent on getting the feeling of the song across, and at one point refused to record further. While many of the album's songs were new compositions, some had been in R.E.M.'s show setlists for years; "Pretty Persuasion" and "(Don't Go Back To) Rockville" had been played live as far back as October 1980. The band was reluctant to record "Pretty Persuasion," as the members considered it too old, but Dixon and Easter convinced the group to do so. R.E.M. initially planned to release "(Don't Go Back to) Rockville" as a non-album single between Reckoning and its next release. When the band recorded it for the album, the group rearranged the song from its live incarnation and gave it a country rock influence as tribute to their legal advisor Bertis Downs IV, who was a fan of country music.

The following additional songs were recorded during the Reckoning sessions:

Additional songs recorded during Reckoning sessions
Title	Source
"Walter's Theme"	"So. Central Rain (I'm Sorry)" single
"King of the Road"	"So. Central Rain (I'm Sorry)" single
"Voice of Harold"	"So. Central Rain (I'm Sorry)" single
"Pale Blue Eyes"	"So. Central Rain (I'm Sorry)" single
"Burning Down"	"Wendell Gee" single
"Ages of You"	"Wendell Gee" single
"Femme Fatale"	"Superman" single

== Packaging ==
For the cover of Reckoning, Stipe drew a picture of a two-headed snake, which he then gave to artist Howard Finster to fill in as a painting. Stipe stated that the imagery was an attempt to define the elements, explaining, "Part of it is rocks and part of it is the sun and part of it the sky." The end result was considered a disappointment, as Stipe had to work with Finster on a long-distance basis, and the reproduction of the artwork for the album sleeve was problematic. The spine of the vinyl version of the album features the phrase "File Under Water". Stipe told NME in 1984 the phrase is the true title of the record. He added "In America, both titles are on the spine, with nothing on the cover. Here [in the United Kingdom] they insisted on Reckoning being on the cover." Instead of labeling the sides of the record as "side one" and "side two", the sides were designated as "L" and "R", respectively.

The back cover features individual photographs of the band members, including a photograph of Stipe taken by Michael Plen at the Paris nightclub Les Bains Douches on November 24, 1983.

== Release and reception ==
Professional ratings
Review scores
Source	Rating
AllMusic	5/5 stars
Chicago Tribune	3.5/4 stars
Christgau's Record Guide	B+
Entertainment Weekly	A−
The Guardian	4/5 stars
Pitchfork	10/10
Q	4/5 stars
Rolling Stone	4/5 stars
The Rolling Stone Album Guide	4.5/5 stars
Uncut	5/5 stars

Reckoning was released on April 9, 1984, in the United Kingdom and on April 17 in the United States. The album quickly reached number one on the college radio airplay charts, whose audience had highly anticipated the album; however, the band had not received much exposure on commercial radio and MTV by that point. Instead of the music industry standard of waiting for mainstream radio stations to pick up the band's music, I.R.S. hoped to "convince reluctant programmers to add the group by pointing to the press response, word-of-mouth reaction to local live performances and sales figures", according to a July 1984 Los Angeles Times article. The album's first single, "So. Central Rain (I'm Sorry)", was released in May and reached number 85 on the Billboard Hot 100 charts. Its second single, "(Don't Go Back to) Rockville", was released in August; unlike its predecessor, it did not chart. Within a month of its release, Reckoning peaked at number 27 on the Billboard 200 albums chart, and it remained there for nearly a year. While the album's domestic chart placing was unusually high for a college rock band at the time, scant airplay and poor distribution overseas allowed it to chart no higher than number 91 in the United Kingdom. In 1991 the record was certified gold (500,000 copies shipped) by the Recording Industry Association of America.

Rolling Stone gave Reckoning a four-out-of-five star rating. Reviewer Christopher Connelly wrote that in comparison to Murmur the "overall sound is crisper, the lyrics far more comprehensible. And while the album may not mark any major strides forward for the band, R.E.M.'s considerable strengths – Buck's ceaselessly inventive strumming, Mike Mills' exceptional bass playing and Stipe's evocatively gloomy baritone – remain unchanged". However, Connelly felt that Stipe's "erratic meanderings" were an impediment to the band that "will prevent R.E.M. from transcending cult status". Nonetheless, he concluded, "R.E.M.'s music is able to involve the listener on both an emotional and intellectual level." Joe Sasfy of The Washington Post felt that the songs on the album "trump even Murmur's outstanding songwriting" and stated "there isn't an American band worth following more than R.E.M." NME reviewer Mat Snow wrote that Reckoning "confirms R.E.M. as one of the most beautifully exciting groups on the planet" and called the album "another classic". The album placed seventh in NME's Best Album of the Year critics' poll, and ranked sixth in The Village Voice's Pazz & Jop poll. Slant Magazine listed the album at number 81 on its list of "Best Albums of the 1980s".

The 1992 British CD reissue of the album included five bonus tracks. A 25th anniversary deluxe edition of the album, which was remastered and packaged with a bonus disc featuring a concert recorded at Chicago's Aragon Ballroom on July 7, 1984, was released in 2009.

== Left of Reckoning ==
Eager to explore the music video medium, Stipe secured funding for a short film that would accompany music from the first half of Reckoning. Stipe's concept was to film the project at folk artist R.A. Miller's Whirligig Farm, and he recruited Athens filmmaker James Herbert to direct it. In March 1984 R.E.M. filmed Left of Reckoning at the Whirligig Farm in Rabbittown, Georgia. The short film draws its title from the fact that it is soundtracked by five songs that appear on the "L" side of the vinyl version of Reckoning: "Harborcoat", "7 Chinese Bros.", "So. Central Rain (I'm Sorry)", "Pretty Persuasion", "Time After Time (AnnElise)", in addition to "Second Guessing" from the R side. In contrast to standard music video imagery, the film consists primarily of footage of the band members wandering around the farm, while Herbert utilizes close-ups, silhouettes, and slow motion footage. Herbert utilized rephotography during the editing process, which involved taking photographs of film frames at random, while also closing in or pulling back from the image with no regard to narrative. According to Buck, "It was really inexpensive to make and kind of fun. We just asked [Herbert] to edit something to four minutes' length, but he's used to making 20-minute films, that's the length he works in. He just made this film that goes along with the first side of the record." While MTV did not air the complete film, the channel's program The Cutting Edge (funded by I.R.S.) aired the "Time After Time (AnnElise)" segment, and the snippet featuring "Pretty Persuasion" was aired by other music programs. The full film was later included on the video releases Succumbs and When the Light Is Mine: The Best of the I.R.S. Years 1982–1987.

== Track listing ==
All songs written by Bill Berry, Peter Buck, Mike Mills, and Michael Stipe.

Side one – "(L) The Left Side"

1. "Harborcoat" – 3:54
2. "7 Chinese Bros." – 4:18
3. "So. Central Rain (I'm Sorry)" – 3:15
4. "Pretty Persuasion" – 3:50
5. "Time After Time (Annelise)" – 3:31

Side two – "(R) The Right Side"

1. "Second Guessing" – 2:51
2. "Letter Never Sent" – 2:59
3. "Camera" – 5:52
4. "(Don't Go Back To) Rockville" – 4:55
5. "Little America" – 2:58

== Personnel ==
Personnel taken from CD booklet.

R.E.M.

- Bill Berry – drums, backing vocals
- Peter Buck – guitars
- Mike Mills – bass guitar, backing vocals; piano (2, 3, 9)
- Michael Stipe – lead vocals (credited as "lead vocal instrument")

Production

- Don Dixon – producer, engineer (credited as "machinist")
- Mitch Easter – producer, engineer (credited as "machinist")
- Howard Finster – art direction

== Chart positions ==
=== Weekly charts ===
Chart (1984)	Peak position
Australia (Kent Music Report)	27
New Zealand (RMNZ)	23
UK Albums Chart	91
US Billboard 200	27

=== Year-end charts ===
Year	Chart	Position
1984	US Billboard 200	70

=== Singles ===
Year	Song	Chart	Position
1984	"So. Central Rain (I'm Sorry)"	US Billboard Hot 100	85
1984	"So. Central Rain (I'm Sorry)"	US Billboard Mainstream Rock Tracks	43

== Certifications ==
Region	Certification	Certified units/sales
United Kingdom (BPI)	Silver	60,000^{‡}
United States (RIAA)	Gold	500,000^{^}
^{^} Shipments figures based on certification alone.^{‡} Sales+streaming figures based on certification alone.

== Release history ==
Region	Date	Label	Format	Catalog
United States	April 17, 1984	I.R.S.	vinyl LP	SP 70044
United States	April 17, 1984	I.R.S.	cassette tape	CS 70044
Canada	April 17, 1984	I.R.S.	LP	SP 70044
Canada	April 17, 1984	I.R.S.	cassette tape	CS 70044
United Kingdom	April 9, 1984	I.R.S.	LP	ILP 7045
United Kingdom	April 9, 1984	I.R.S.	cassette tape	IRSA 7045
Japan	June 21, 1984	I.R.S.	vinyl LP	28AP-2847
Australia	1984	I.R.S.	LP	ELPS 4431
Australia	1984	I.R.S.	cassette tape	ELPC 4431
Germany	1984	I.R.S.	LP	ILS 7045
Germany	1984	I.R.S.	cassette tape	465379 4
United States	1985	I.R.S.	Compact Disc	CD 70044
United Kingdom	1985	I.R.S.	Compact Disc	CDA 70044
Europe	1985	I.R.S.	Compact Disc	CDA 70044
The Netherlands	August 10, 1992	I.R.S.	Compact Disc	0777 7 13159 2 3†
Japan	September 23, 1992	I.R.S. / EMI	Compact Disc	TOCP-53567†
United States	August 12, 1996	Mobile Fidelity	Compact Disc	UDCD 677
United States	August 12, 1996	Mobile Fidelity	LP	MFSL 1-261
United Kingdom	June 22, 2009	Universal	Compact Disc	2707622††
United States	June 23, 2009	I.R.S. / Universal	Compact Disc	602527076225††

Notes

- † I.R.S. Vintage Years edition, with bonus tracks
- †† Remastered Deluxe Edition, with Live at Aragon Ballroom bonus disc
