= Murmur (album) =

1983 studio album by R.E.M.

Studio album by R.E.M.
- Released: April 12, 1983
- Recorded: January 6 – February 23, 1983
- Studios: Reflection Sound (Charlotte, North Carolina, US); Drive-In (Winston-Salem, North Carolina, US) (Note: The version of Sitting Still included on the album is the same as the Hib-Tone single, although with some changes.)
- Genres: Jangle pop; alternative rock; post-punk; folk rock; garage rock
- Length: 44:11
- Label: I.R.S.
- Producers: Don Dixon; Mitch Easter

R.E.M. chronology
Chronic Town (1982)	Murmur (1983)	Reckoning (1984)

Singles from Murmur
- 1. "Radio Free Europe" Released: June 8, 1983; 2. "Talk About the Passion" Released: November 1983

Murmur is the debut studio album by the American alternative rock band R.E.M., released on April 12, 1983, by I.R.S. Records. The album was recorded in the winter of 1983 at Reflection Sound Studios in Charlotte, North Carolina, with musicians Don Dixon and Mitch Easter serving as producers. Murmur received critical acclaim upon release for its unconventional sound, defined by lead singer Michael Stipe's cryptic lyrics, guitarist Peter Buck's jangly playing, and Mike Mills' melodic basslines. In 2003, the album was ranked number 197 in Rolling Stone magazine's list of the "500 Greatest Albums of All Time". It retained the position in the 2012 list and was raised to number 165 in the 2020 revision.

== Background and recording ==
R.E.M. started preparing for their debut album in December 1982. I.R.S. paired R.E.M. with producer Stephen Hague, who had a higher profile than the band's previous producer Mitch Easter. Hague's emphasis on technical perfection did not suit the band; the producer made the group perform multiple takes of the song "Catapult", which demoralized drummer Bill Berry. Hague then took the completed track to Syncro Sound studios in Boston and added keyboard parts without the band's permission and to their dismay. Unsatisfied, the band members asked the label to let them record with Easter. I.R.S. agreed to a "tryout" session, allowing the band to travel to North Carolina and record the song "Pilgrimage" with Easter and producing partner Don Dixon. After hearing the track, I.R.S. permitted the group to record the album with Dixon and Easter.

On January 6, 1983, R.E.M. entered Reflection Studios in Charlotte, North Carolina, to begin recording sessions with Easter and Dixon. Much of the band's material for the album had been tested on preceding tours. Because of their bad experience with Hague, the band recorded the album via a process of negation, refusing to incorporate rock music clichés such as guitar solos or then-popular synthesizers to give it a timeless feel. Berry specifically was resistant to "odd" musical suggestions, insisting that his drums be recorded in a drummer's booth, a practice that was considered antiquated at the time. Dixon and Easter took a hands-off approach to much of the recording process. The pair would only fix up a vocal track or ask lead singer Michael Stipe to re-record a vocal if it was very substandard. "Being both musicians, our approach was to leave as little imprint as possible," Dixon recalled in 1994. "We felt like our job was to, as cheaply as possible, reproduce what appeared to be just them playing live."

Due to Buck's Fender Twin Reverb amplifier being "dead", every song except 'Pilgrimage' instead featured Easter's Ampeg Gemini II. Mills's Dan Armstrong bass guitar was set aside in favor of a Rickenbacker 4001 owned by Easter's girlfriend.

In a rare instance of R.E.M. co-writing, Stipe asked friend Neil Bogan to contribute lyrics to "West of the Fields".

Recording was completed on February 23, 1983.

== Composition and music ==
On Murmur, R.E.M.'s sound is "firmly" rooted in American folk rock, post-punk, and garage rock. According to Stephen Thomas Erlewine of AllMusic, the band abandoned the "garagey jangle pop" of their previous releases, instead opting for "a strangely subdued variation of their trademark sound." He explained, "Heightening the enigmatic tendencies of Chronic Town by de-emphasizing the backbeat and accentuating the ambience of the ringing guitar, R.E.M. created a distinctive sound for the album -- one that sounds eerily timeless. [...] Murmur sounds as if it appeared out of nowhere, without any ties to the past, present, or future. [...] The songs on Murmur sound as if they've existed forever, yet they subvert folk and pop conventions by taking unpredictable twists and turns into melodic, evocative territory." The album's production has been described as "atmospheric." The album also incorporates piano.

R.E.M. guitarist Peter Buck took stylistic cues from the Byrds, Television, and the Feelies. Vocalist Michael Stipe has been said to have "elevated mumbled vocals to an art form." The album's rhythm section is heavily influenced by British post-punk, though with less of the funk influence associated with the style.

== Artwork and packaging ==
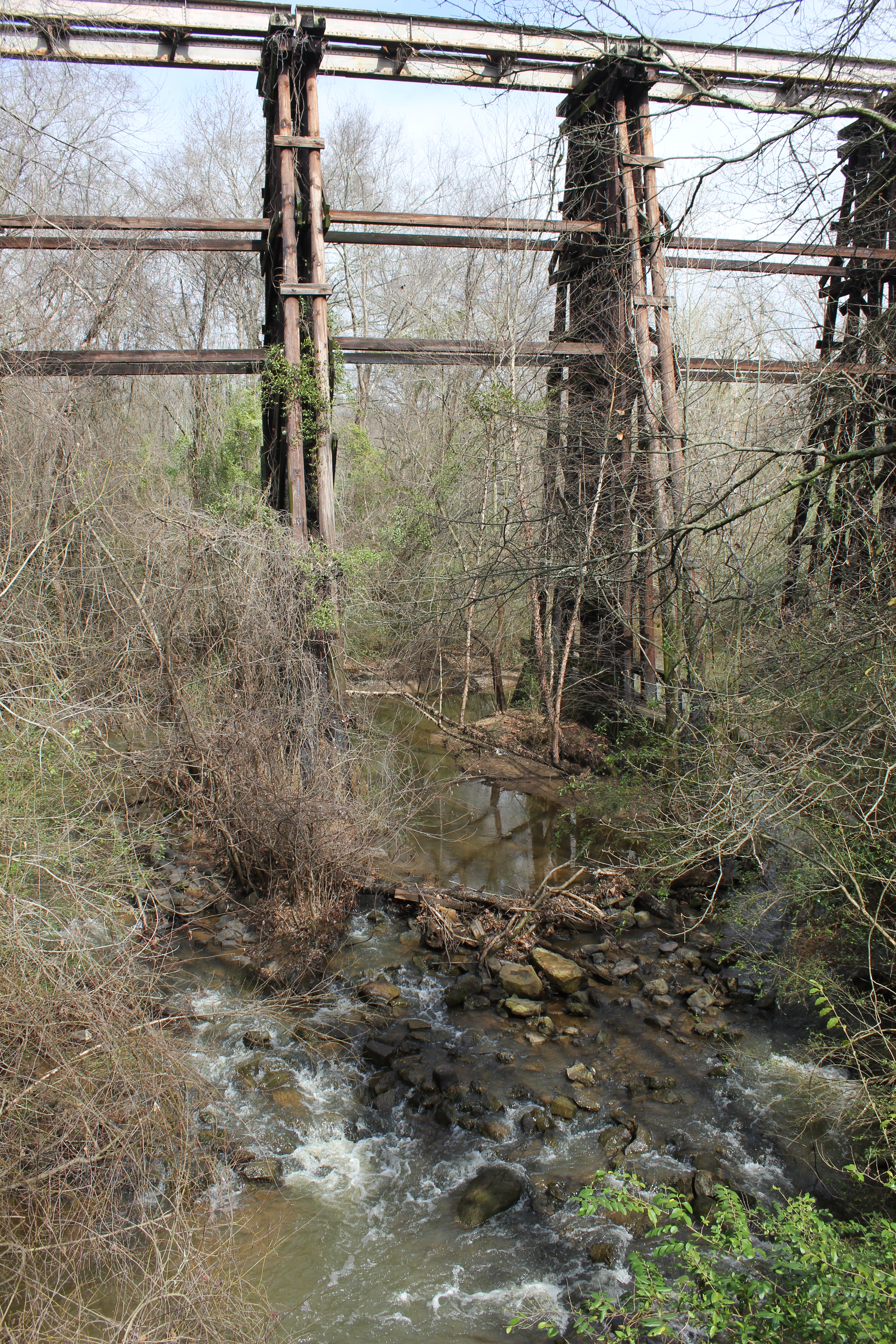
The train trestle from the cover became a tourist destination, even in its dilapidated state, resulting in a replica being built after the original's demolition.

The front cover features an image of a large quantity of the noxious weed kudzu, which grows so rapidly that it overtakes the landscape and kills other plants by completely shading them. The trestle featured on the back cover of the original vinyl LP release, originally part of the Georgia Railroad line into downtown Athens, became a local landmark. Plans to demolish the trestle, now commonly referred to as the "Murmur Trestle", were met with public outcry. On October 2, 2000, the Athens-Clarke County Mayor and Commission voted to save the trestle. In 2012, the local government said it cannot afford to keep it and declared in 2016 that it would likely come down. Later that year, the Athens-Clarke County Commission suggested that a trail tax could fund its existence. The Murmur Trestle was approved for demolition in 2019, and work began in 2020 to destroy it. The replacement bridge, part of the Firefly Trail (itself a component of the Georgie Hi–Lo Trail), is composed of three sections: a replica of the original wooden trestle design and two sections of new weathered steel arches. The bridge was opened to the public in April 2023.

Copies of the initial tape edition (catalogue number CS 70604) list a cover of "There She Goes Again" by the Velvet Underground as the final track, but it is not present. This mistake was fixed with subsequent printings. The track was rumored to be intended for Murmur, but removed so that all the tracks would be original and the group would not have to take a royalty cut. The band later distanced itself from this rumor. The cover was included as a B-side to the I.R.S. issue of "Radio Free Europe" instead.

== Reception and legacy ==
Professional ratings
Review scores
Source	Rating
AllMusic	5/5 stars
Blender	5/5 stars
Chicago Tribune	4/4 stars
Entertainment Weekly	A
Pitchfork	10/10
Q	5/5 stars
Rolling Stone	4/5 stars
The Rolling Stone Album Guide	5/5 stars
Uncut	5/5 stars
The Village Voice	A−

Murmur was released in April 1983. The record reached number 36 on the Billboard album chart. A re-recorded version of "Radio Free Europe" was the album's lead single and reached number 78 on the Billboard singles chart that year. Despite the acclaim awarded the album, by the end of 1983 Murmur had only sold about 200,000 copies, which I.R.S.'s Jay Boberg felt was below expectations. Murmur was eventually certified gold (500,000 units shipped) by the Recording Industry Association of America in 1991.

The album drew substantial critical acclaim. Rolling Stone called it "epochal" and gave the album four out of five stars. Reviewer Steve Pond felt the album fulfilled the promise the band showed on Chronic Town. He wrote, "Murmur is the record on which [R.E.M.] trade that potential for results: an intelligent, enigmatic, deeply involving album, it reveals a depth and cohesiveness to R.E.M. that the EP could only suggest." He concluded, "R.E.M. is clearly the important Athens band." Jonathan Gregg of Record described Murmur as "a splendid little film noir of an album, austere but rich in implication." He particularly praised the band's distinctive "twitchy, restless dance beat" and the incomprehensibility of the album's meaning, noting that Stipe's already enigmatic lyrics are often hard to make out due to being sung with a deliberate slur, lost in a muddy mix, and/or drowned out by the instrumental work, resulting in an impressive sense of meaning even as the meaning itself is not understood. It was Rolling Stone's Best Album of 1983, beating Michael Jackson's Thriller, The Police's Synchronicity and U2's War. Buck noted in 2002 that I.R.S. was "mind-boggled" by the album's positive reviews, especially in the British press, since R.E.M. had not yet toured that country.

In 2016, Dan Weiss of Paste Magazine wrote: "Punk never quite married Rickenbacker arpeggios until 'Radio Free Europe' and 'Sitting Still' made it safe for bands like the dB's."

A 2023 listing of the best debut albums by Paste included Murmur at sixth place, stating that "the way Buck’s guitar and Mike Mills’ bass busily bounced around otherwise simple choruses created something entirely new". In 2025, Radio X included the album in its list of "The 25 best indie debut albums of the 1980s".

Stephen Thomas Erlewine of AllMusic gave the album a perfect score, and wrote: "R.E.M. may have made albums as good as Murmur in the years following its release, but they never again made anything that sounded quite like it." Music journalist Andrew Earles highlighted the tracks "Laughing" and "Sitting Still" in his book Gimme Indie Rock, calling them "required listening for absolutely any fan of American underground rock".

=== Accolades ===
Since its release, Murmur has featured heavily in various "must have" lists compiled by the music media. In 1989, it was rated number eight on Rolling Stone magazine's list of the 100 greatest albums of the 1980s. In 2003, the TV network VH1 named Murmur the 92nd greatest album of all time. Some of the more prominent of these lists to feature Murmur are shown below. The album was also included in the book 1001 Albums You Must Hear Before You Die.

Accolades for Murmur
Publication	Country	Accolade	Year	Rank
Rolling Stone	US	Top 100 Albums of the Last 20 Years	1987	#58
Spin	US	100 Alternative Albums	1995	#8
Pitchfork	US	Top 100 Albums of the 1980s	2002	#5
Rolling Stone	US	The 500 Greatest Albums of All Time	2012	#197
Rolling Stone	US	The 500 Greatest Albums of All Time	2020	#165
Blender	US	500 CDs You Must Own Before You Die	2003	
Q	UK	The 40 Best Records of the 80s	2006	#6
Mojo	UK	The 100 Records That Changed the World	2007	#75
Slant Magazine	US	Vital Pop: 50 Essential Pop Albums	2003	
Slant Magazine	US	Best Albums of the 1980s	2012	#13
Rolling Stone	US	The 100 Best Debut Albums of All Time	2013	#18

== Track listing ==
All songs written by Bill Berry, Peter Buck, Mike Mills, and Michael Stipe; additional lyrics on "West of the Fields" by Neil Bogan.

Side one

1. "Radio Free Europe" – 4:06
2. "Pilgrimage" – 4:30
3. "Laughing" – 3:57
4. "Talk About the Passion" – 3:23
5. "Moral Kiosk" – 3:31
6. "Perfect Circle" – 3:29

Side two

1. "Catapult" – 3:55
2. "Sitting Still" – 3:17
3. "9–9" – 3:03
4. "Shaking Through" – 4:30
5. "We Walk" – 3:02
6. "West of the Fields" – 3:17

== Personnel ==
R.E.M.

- Bill Berry – drums, backing vocals, percussion, piano on "Perfect Circle"
- Peter Buck – electric and acoustic guitars
- Mike Mills – bass guitar, backing vocals, piano, organ, acoustic guitar, vibraphone on "Pilgrimage"
- Michael Stipe – lead vocals

Production and additional musicians

- Greg Calbi – mastering at Sterling Sound, New York City
- Don Dixon – production, engineering, acoustic guitar, bass guitar on "Perfect Circle"
- Mitch Easter – production, engineering, acoustic guitar, backwards guitar on "Perfect Circle", additional snare drum on "Radio Free Europe"
- Carl Grasso – art design
- Ann Kinney – art design
- Sandra Lee Phipps – photography and art design
- Unnamed member of the Charlotte Symphony Orchestra – cello on "Talk About The Passion"

== Chart performance ==
Murmur chart performance
Year	Chart	Position
1983	US Billboard 200	36
1994	UK Albums Chart	100
1996	UK Albums Chart	111
2009	UK Albums Chart	199 (Deluxe Edition)

Singles

Murmur's singles chart performance
Year	Single	Chart	Position
1983	"Radio Free Europe"	Billboard Mainstream Rock	25
1983	"Radio Free Europe"	Billboard Pop Singles	78

== Certifications ==
Sales certifications for Murmur
Organization	Level	Date
RIAA – US	Gold	October 10, 1991

== Release history ==
Murmur was bundled together with Chronic Town and Reckoning in the United Kingdom as The Originals in 1993.

On November 25, 2008, I.R.S. Records, A&M, and Universal Music released a 25th anniversary edition two-disc reissue of Murmur. Disc one features the standard 12-track album, digitally remastered, and disc two contains a previously unreleased live concert the band played at Larry's Hideaway in Toronto on July 9, 1983. This set was recorded by Blair Packham of the Jitters.

In addition to Murmur songs, the set includes tracks from Chronic Town, a Velvet Underground cover, and early versions of songs from Reckoning and Lifes Rich Pageant. The release also includes a fold-out poster insert, featuring exclusive essays by Don Dixon and Mitch Easter, as well as former I.R.S. executives Jay Boberg, Sig Sigworth, and art designer Carl Grasso.

Murmur release history
Region	Date	Label	Format	Catalog
United States	April 12, 1983	I.R.S.	vinyl LP	SP 70604
United States	April 12, 1983	I.R.S.	vinyl LP	44797-0014-1
United States	April 12, 1983	I.R.S.	Compact disc	44797-0014-2
United States	April 12, 1983	I.R.S.	cassette tape	44797-0014-4
United States	April 12, 1983	I.R.S.	cassette tape	CS 70604
United Kingdom	August 29, 1983	I.R.S.	LP	70014
United States	1983	I.R.S./A&M	Compact Disc	70014
The Netherlands	1983	Illegal	LP	25433
South Africa	1983	I.R.S./CBS	LP	ASF-2886
Worldwide	1990	A&M	Compact Disc	70014
Worldwide	1991	A&M	Compact Disc	129
The Netherlands	July 31, 1992	EMI	Compact Disc	7 13158 2†
The Netherlands	1992	I.R.S.	LP	4653781
United States	1995	Mobile Fidelity Sound Lab	LP	231‡
United States	1995	Mobile Fidelity Sound Lab	Compact Disc	642‡
Europe	1999	EMI	Compact Disc	13158†
Europe	2000	I.R.S.	Compact Disc	7131582†
Asia	2007	Toshiba/EMI	Compact Disc	53571
United States	November 25, 2008	I.R.S./Universal Music Group	Compact Disc	B0012251-02•

†I.R.S. Vintage Years edition, with bonus tracks
‡Remastered edition on 180-gram vinyl and gold Compact Disc
•Remastered Deluxe Edition, with Live at Larry's Hide-Away bonus disc

The Originals release history
Region	Date	Label	Format	Catalog
United Kingdom	1995	I.R.S./EMI	CD box set	7243 8 35088 2 2

== See also ==
- List of 1980s albums considered the best
- Paisley Underground
