= Lifes Rich Pageant =

1986 studio album by R.E.M.

Studio album by R.E.M.
- Released: July 28, 1986
- Recorded: April and May 1986
- Studio: Belmont Mall (Belmont, Indiana)
- Genres: Jangle pop; alternative rock; heartland rock
- Length: 38:23
- Label: I.R.S.
- Producer: Don Gehman

R.E.M. chronology
Fables of the Reconstruction (1985)	Lifes Rich Pageant (1986)	Dead Letter Office (1987)

Singles from Lifes Rich Pageant
- 1. "Fall on Me" Released: August 1986; 2. "Superman" Released: November 1986

Lifes Rich Pageant is the fourth studio album by the American alternative rock band R.E.M., released on July 28, 1986, by I.R.S. Records. R.E.M. chose Don Gehman to produce the album, which was recorded at John Mellencamp's Belmont Mall Studio in Belmont, Indiana. This was the only album the band recorded with Gehman, who moved them from the more obscure and dense sound of their earlier albums to an accessible, hard rock-influenced quality. The album was well-received critically.

== Recording and production ==
During the first half of 1986, the band took a break from touring to recover energy. They wanted to make a change from the sound of their previous album, with Mills saying "We wanted to get away from the sort of murky feelings and sounds that we got out of Joe [Boyd, producer on Fables of the Reconstruction] in London". They wanted a "really hard-driving record, but we also like to throw in a lot of things: pianos and organs and accordions and banjos and what-not" and considered working with Gehman as they liked the acoustic sound of his work with John Mellencamp. They initially met for a number of demo sessions at John Keane's Studio in Athens, Georgia, in January & March 1986 (These recordings would later be released as the "Athens Demos" on the 25th-anniversary re-release of the album). After being initially skeptical, they embraced the new recording process with Gehman later stating that:

"I liked to spend time on the arrangement and layer in the overdubs and comp the vocals—all this process which, to me, was normal record-making, they had never been through before. When they saw that kind of record-making process didn't take anything away—that it actually added another level of artistic expression—they were very excited by it."

The album was recorded at Mellencamp's Belmont Mall Recording Studio in Belmont, Indiana, in April and May 1986. The recording studio was larger and had newer technology than they were used to, and they enjoyed the area, attending many concerts in nearby Bloomington while there. The band were also happy with the production of the record and the extra clarity of the vocals, bassist Mike Mills saying:

"Don (Gehman, the album's producer) is good at layering things so there can be a lot of things going on but you can still hear everything. And as far as Michael's vocals go, it's a combination of things: Michael is getting better at what he's doing, and he's getting more confident at it. And I think that shows up in the projection of his voice. The overall sound of everything was so good, we didn't mind having the vocals mixed as loud as they were."

In 2025, Gehman said, "Not only would I not understand what the words would mean if I knew exactly what he was saying but I couldn't hear it either." He wanted to get the vocals up front, even if they did not make a lot of sense. Gehman said Stipe felt he was being asked "to be anal in his art."

== Music ==
The ecologically minded "Cuyahoga" refers to the once heavily polluted Cuyahoga River that flows into Lake Erie at Cleveland, Ohio. The song includes the lyric we burned the river down, which refers to the several occasions (most famously in 1969) when the river actually caught fire.

At the end of "Just a Touch" frontman Michael Stipe can be heard screaming the line "I'm so young, I'm so goddamn young", quoting longtime influence Patti Smith's live cover version of The Who's "My Generation" released on the B-side of her 1976 single "Gloria", which she also uses at the end of her cover version of "Privilege (Set Me Free)" from her 1978 album Easter.

== Packaging ==
The album title is based on an English idiom. Its use is very old, but R.E.M.'s use is, according to guitarist Peter Buck, from the 1964 film A Shot in the Dark, minus the apostrophe:

Inspector Clouseau opens a car door, falling into a fountain.
Maria: "You should get out of these clothes immediately. You'll catch your death of pneumonia, you will."
Clouseau: "Yes, I probably will. But it's all part of life's rich pageant, you know?"

The cover of the album is a photograph of drummer Bill Berry, on the upper half, and a pair of bison, signifying an environmental theme, on the lower half. It also alludes to Buffalo Bill.

== Release ==
With R.E.M.'s fan base beginning to grow beyond its college rock boundaries, Lifes Rich Pageant proved at the time to be the band's most commercially successful album in the United States, peaking at number 21 on the Billboard charts and heralding the band's first gold record. In the UK, the album managed a number 43 peak.

The ecologically conscious "Fall on Me" (a personal favorite of Michael Stipe) and a cover of the Clique's "Superman", sung by Mike Mills, were the only singles released from the album (the single version of the latter removed the sample from one of the Godzilla movies that began the album version).

== Reception ==
Professional ratings
Review scores
Source	Rating
AllMusic	4.5/5 stars
Chicago Tribune	2.5/4 stars
Christgau's Record Guide	B+
Entertainment Weekly	A
The Guardian	5/5 stars
Pitchfork	8.8/10
Q	4/5 stars
Rolling Stone	4/5 stars
The Rolling Stone Album Guide	5/5 stars
Uncut	5/5 stars

According to the review aggregator Metacritic, Lifes Rich Pageant received "universal acclaim" based on a weighted average score of 93 out of 100 from 20 critic scores. PopMatters included it in their list of the "12 Essential 1980s Alternative Rock Albums". Slant Magazine listed the album at #52 on its list of "Best Albums of 1980s" saying "Lifes Rich Pageant stands as a nearly seamless transition between the band's formative period and their commercial dominance." In 2000, it ranked at number 162 in the list of Virgin's All-Time Album Top 1000 List.

Anthony DeCurtis, writing a contemporary review for Rolling Stone, called it "brilliant and groundbreaking, if modestly flawed", praising it as "the most outward looking record R.E.M. has made." He found that it "carries on ... the dark Southern folk artistry of last year's Fables of the Reconstruction" and "paints a swirling, impressionistic portrait of a country at the moral crossroads". Robert Christgau gave the album B+ in a dismissive review that complained of a lack of progress from earlier albums.

Retrospective reviews of the album in the context of the band's later work (beginning with the following original studio album, Document) have been positive. Gavin Edwards, writing in 2003, gave it four stars, praising "Fall on Me" in particular as "the finest song in the R.E.M. canon. A lullaby of modern anxiety, it's flexible enough to serve as a potent metaphor for acid rain, nuclear warfare, satellite surveillance or any other modern phobia you choose". Stephen Deusner, writing for Pitchfork, calls it "invigorating", citing it as R.E.M.'s first transitional album, simultaneously their "most pop-oriented and accessible album up to that point" and "most overtly political collection, with songs addressing environmental crises and political malaise". Alexis Petridis of The Guardian says it "may represent the band at their absolute zenith... imbued with a swaggering confidence absent from its murky predecessor". Petridis also singles out "Fall on Me" for its "beautiful opacity" and the "sumptuousness of its melody". Andrew Mueller in Uncut argues that it represents R.E.M. embracing the mainstream: "For the first time, it had occurred to REM that they had a constituency – and, indeed, that it might be possible and desirable to build on that" with an album where "Every note... fizzes and crackles with the urgency of people who've made their minds up".

Both DeCurtis and Deusner praise the production work of Don Gehman, comparing it favorably to their previous album Fables of the Reconstruction. DeCurtis said Gehman "has done an outstanding job of hardening R.E.M.’s sonic jolt" while Deusner stated of Gehman that by "giving the melodic leads their own space, he emphasizes the muscle in Berry's beats and the intricate interaction between the rhythm section".

In a 2026 article, Miranda Wollen, writing for Paste, praised the album and spoke of how it still speaks to issues today saying "The details and names have (somewhat) changed, but the primary complaint of R.E.M.'s fourth record remains disturbingly fitting, and I remain obsessed with it."

== Track listing ==
All songs written by Bill Berry, Peter Buck, Mike Mills and Michael Stipe, except "Superman" by Mitchell Bottler and Gary Zekley.

Side one – "Dinner side"

1. "Begin the Begin" – 3:28
2. "These Days" – 3:24
3. "Fall on Me" – 2:50
4. "Cuyahoga" – 4:19
5. "Hyena" – 2:50
6. "Underneath the Bunker" – 1:25

Side two – "Supper side"

1. "The Flowers of Guatemala" – 3:55
2. "I Believe" – 3:49
3. "What If We Give It Away?" – 3:33
4. "Just a Touch" – 3:00
5. "Swan Swan H" – 2:42
6. "Superman" – 2:52

Notes

- The original LP and CD back covers give an incorrect running order: "Begin the Begin," "Hyena," "Just a Touch," "I Believe," "These Days," "The Flowers of Guatemala," "Cuyahoga," "What If We Give It Away?," "Fall on Me," "Swan Swan H"; the last track is listed as "+_______", so that "Underneath the Bunker" and "Superman" are not listed at all. Some pressings correct the track listing.
- Some early UK compact disc copies list the track as "Superwoman".

== Personnel ==
R.E.M.

- Bill Berry – drums, vocals
- Peter Buck – guitar
- Mike Mills – bass, vocals
- Michael Stipe – vocals

Production

- M. Bird – illustrations
- Jim Dineen – engineering
- Gregg Edward – mixing at Can-Am Recorders, Los Angeles, California, United States
- Rick Fetig – engineering
- Don Gehman – production, mixing
- Ross Hogarth – engineering
- Stan Katayama – engineering
- Bob Ludwig – mastering, at Masterdisc, New York City, New York, United States
- Sandra Lee Phipps – photography
- Juanita Rogers – back cover painting
- R. O. Scarelli – packaging
- B. Slay – illustrations

== Chart positions ==
=== Weekly charts ===
Chart (1986)	Peak position
Australia (Kent Music Report)	73
Canada (RPM)	56
UK Albums Chart	43
US Billboard 200	21

=== Year-end charts ===
Year	Chart	Position
1986	US Billboard 200	88
1987	US Billboard 200	92

=== Singles ===
Year	Song	Chart	Position
1986	"Fall on Me"	Billboard Hot 100	94
1986	"Fall on Me"	Billboard Mainstream Rock Tracks	5
1986	"Fall on Me"	New Zealand (RMNZ)	4
1986	"Superman"	Billboard Mainstream Rock Tracks	17
1987	"Superman"	Billboard Hot 100	74

== Certifications ==
Region	Certification	Certified units/sales
Canada (Music Canada)	Platinum	100,000^{^}
United Kingdom (BPI)	Silver	60,000^{^}
United States (RIAA)	Gold	500,000^{^}
^{*} Sales figures based on certification alone.^{^} Shipments figures based on certification alone.

== Release history ==
Region	Date	Label	Format	Catalog
United States	July 28, 1986	I.R.S.	vinyl LP	IRS-5783
United States	July 28, 1986	I.R.S.	Compact Disc	IRSD-5783
United States	July 28, 1986	I.R.S.	cassette tape	IRSC-5783
Canada	July 28, 1986	I.R.S.	LP	IRS-5783
Canada	July 28, 1986	I.R.S.	Compact Disc	IRSBD 5783
Canada	July 28, 1986	I.R.S.	cassette tape	IRSMC-5783
United Kingdom	July 28, 1986	I.R.S.	LP	MIRG 1014
United Kingdom	July 28, 1986	I.R.S.	Compact Disc	CDIRG 1014
United Kingdom	July 28, 1986	I.R.S.	cassette tape	MIRGC 1014
Japan	October 22, 1986	I.R.S.	LP	28AP 3240
Australia	1986	I.R.S.	LP	LIB 5079
Australia	1986	I.R.S.	cassette tape	LIBC 5079
Brazil	1986	Epic	LP	14495
Greece	1986	I.R.S.	LP	57064
The Netherlands	1986	Illegal	LP	ILP 57064
New Zealand	1986	I.R.S.	LP	ELPS 4550
Spain	1986	Illegal	LP	ILP 57064
Worldwide	1990	MCA	Compact Disc	5783
United States	1992	Universal	Compact Disc	19080
The Netherlands	January 26, 1993	EMI	Compact Disc	7 13201 2 5†
Japan	February 24, 1993	Toshiba EMI	Compact Disc	TOCP-7269†
Worldwide	1998	Capitol	Compact Disc	93478
Europe	1998	EMI	Compact Disc	13201†
Europe	1999	EMI	Compact Disc	7132012†
United States	July 12, 2011	Capitol / EMI	Compact Disc	5099908244727††
United States	November 22, 2011	Mobile Fidelity	LP	N/A
United States	July 29, 2016	I.R.S.	LP	IRSLP85140

Notes

- † I.R.S. Vintage Years edition, with bonus tracks
- †† 25th anniversary edition, with bonus disc
