= List of songs recorded by R.E.M. =

This is a comprehensive list of songs recorded by the American alternative rock band R.E.M. that were officially released. The list includes songs performed by the entire band only (Berry, Buck, Mills and Stipe 1980 to 1997; Buck, Mills and Stipe 1998 to 2011). Side projects, including contributions by solo members of the band, are not included in this list. The list consists mostly of studio recordings. Remix and live recordings are not listed separately unless the song was only released in that form. Album singles are listed as released on their respective album. Only one release is listed per song, except for a couple of re-recordings, like their first Hib-Tone single.

Song	Release	Songwriter(s)	Producer	Year
"#9 Dream"	Instant Karma: The Amnesty International Campaign to Save Darfur compilation album	John Lennon	David Barbe and R.E.M.	2007
"1,000,000"	Chronic Town	Bill Berry, Peter Buck, Mike Mills, Michael Stipe	Mitch Easter and R.E.M.	1982
"11th Untitled Song"	Green	Bill Berry, Peter Buck, Mike Mills, Michael Stipe	Scott Litt and R.E.M.	1988
"165 Hillcrest"	"All the Way to Reno (You're Gonna Be a Star)" single	Peter Buck, Mike Mills, Michael Stipe	Pat McCarthy and R.E.M.	2001
"2JN"	"Imitation of Life" single	Peter Buck, Mike Mills, Michael Stipe	Pat McCarthy and R.E.M.	2001
"32 Chord Song"	"I'll Take the Rain" single	Peter Buck, Mike Mills, Michael Stipe	Pat McCarthy and R.E.M.	2001
"7 Chinese Bros."	Reckoning	Bill Berry, Peter Buck, Mike Mills, Michael Stipe	Don Dixon, Mitch Easter	1984
"9-9"	Murmur	Bill Berry, Peter Buck, Mike Mills, Michael Stipe	Don Dixon, Mitch Easter	1983
"A Month of Saturdays"	Part Lies, Part Heart, Part Truth, Part Garbage 1982–2011	Peter Buck, Mike Mills, Michael Stipe	Jacknife Lee and R.E.M.	2011
"Academy Fight Song"	fanclub single	Clint Conley		1989
"Accelerate"	Accelerate	Peter Buck, Mike Mills, Michael Stipe	Jacknife Lee and R.E.M.	2008
"Adagio"	"Bad Day" single	Peter Buck, Mike Mills, Michael Stipe	Pat McCarthy and R.E.M.	2003
"After Hours" (live)	"Losing My Religion" single	Lou Reed	Scott Litt and R.E.M.	1991
"Aftermath"	Around the Sun	Peter Buck, Mike Mills, Michael Stipe	Pat McCarthy and R.E.M.	2004
"Ages of You"	"Wendell Gee" single	Bill Berry, Peter Buck, Mike Mills, Michael Stipe	Joe Boyd	1985
"Airliner"	"Supernatural Superserious" single	Buck, Mills, Stipe, Scott McCaughey	Jacknife Lee and R.E.M.	2008
"Airportman"	Up	Peter Buck, Mike Mills, Michael Stipe	Pat McCarthy and R.E.M.	1998
"All I Have to Do Is Dream"	from the documentary Athens, GA: Inside/Out.	Felice and Boudleaux Bryant		1986
"All the Best"	Collapse into Now	Peter Buck, Mike Mills, Michael Stipe	Jacknife Lee and R.E.M.	2011
"All the Right Friends" (first version)	Dead Letter Office I.R.S. Vintage Years reissue	Bill Berry, Peter Buck, Mike Mills, Michael Stipe	Don Dixon, Mitch Easter	1987
"All the Right Friends"	Vanilla Sky soundtrack	Bill Berry, Peter Buck, Mike Mills, Michael Stipe	Pat McCarthy and R.E.M.	2001
"All the Way to Reno (You're Gonna Be a Star)"	Reveal	Peter Buck, Mike Mills, Michael Stipe	Pat McCarthy and R.E.M.	2001
"Alligator_Aviator_Autopilot_Antimatter"	Collapse into Now	Peter Buck, Mike Mills, Michael Stipe	Jacknife Lee and R.E.M.	2011
"Animal"	In Time: The Best of R.E.M. 1988–2003	Peter Buck, Mike Mills, Michael Stipe	Pat McCarthy and R.E.M.	2003
"The Apologist"	Up	Peter Buck, Mike Mills, Michael Stipe	Pat McCarthy and R.E.M.	1998
"Arms of Love"	"Man on the Moon" single	Robyn Hitchcock	Scott Litt and R.E.M.	1992
"Around the Sun"	Around the Sun	Peter Buck, Mike Mills, Michael Stipe	Pat McCarthy and R.E.M.	2004
"The Ascent of Man"	Around the Sun	Peter Buck, Mike Mills, Michael Stipe	Pat McCarthy and R.E.M.	2004
"At My Most Beautiful"	Up	Peter Buck, Mike Mills, Michael Stipe	Pat McCarthy and R.E.M.	1998
"Auctioneer (Another Engine)"	Fables of the Reconstruction	Bill Berry, Peter Buck, Mike Mills, Michael Stipe	Joe Boyd	1985
"Baby Baby"	fanclub single	Ian "Knox" Carnochan		1991
"Bad Day"	In Time: The Best of R.E.M. 1988–2003	Peter Buck, Mike Mills, Michael Stipe	Pat McCarthy and R.E.M.	2003
"Bandwagon"	"Cant Get There from Here" single	Bill Berry, Peter Buck, Mike Mills, Michael Stipe	Joe Boyd	1985
"Bang and Blame"	Monster	Bill Berry, Peter Buck, Mike Mills, Michael Stipe	Scott Litt and R.E.M.	1994
"Be Mine"	New Adventures in Hi-Fi	Bill Berry, Peter Buck, Mike Mills, Michael Stipe	Scott Litt and R.E.M.	1996
"Beach Ball"	Reveal	Peter Buck, Mike Mills, Michael Stipe	Pat McCarthy and R.E.M.	2001
"Beat a Drum"	Reveal	Peter Buck, Mike Mills, Michael Stipe	Pat McCarthy and R.E.M.	2001
"Begin the Begin"	Lifes Rich Pageant	Bill Berry, Peter Buck, Mike Mills, Michael Stipe	Don Gehman	1986
"Belong"	Out of Time	Bill Berry, Peter Buck, Mike Mills, Michael Stipe	Scott Litt and R.E.M.	1991
"Binky the Doormat"	New Adventures in Hi-Fi	Bill Berry, Peter Buck, Mike Mills, Michael Stipe	Scott Litt and R.E.M.	1996
"Bittersweet Me"	New Adventures in Hi-Fi	Bill Berry, Peter Buck, Mike Mills, Michael Stipe	Scott Litt and R.E.M.	1996
"Blue"	Collapse into Now	Peter Buck, Mike Mills, Michael Stipe, Patti Smith	Jacknife Lee and R.E.M.	2011
"Boy in the Well"	Around the Sun	Peter Buck, Mike Mills, Michael Stipe	Pat McCarthy and R.E.M.	2004
"Burning Down"	"Wendell Gee" single	Bill Berry, Peter Buck, Mike Mills, Michael Stipe	Joe Boyd	1985
"Burning Hell"	"Cant Get There from Here" single	Bill Berry, Peter Buck, Mike Mills, Michael Stipe	Joe Boyd	1985
"Camera"	Reckoning	Bill Berry, Peter Buck, Mike Mills, Michael Stipe	Don Dixon, Mitch Easter	1984
"Cant Get There from Here"	Fables of the Reconstruction	Bill Berry, Peter Buck, Mike Mills, Michael Stipe	Joe Boyd	1985
"Carnival of Sorts (Box Cars)"	Chronic Town	Bill Berry, Peter Buck, Mike Mills, Michael Stipe	Mitch Easter and R.E.M.	1982
"Catapult"	Murmur	Bill Berry, Peter Buck, Mike Mills, Michael Stipe	Don Dixon, Mitch Easter	1983
"Chance (Dub)"	"Everybody Hurts" single	Bill Berry, Peter Buck, Mike Mills, Michael Stipe	Scott Litt and R.E.M.	1993
"Chorus and the Ring"	Reveal	Peter Buck, Mike Mills, Michael Stipe	Pat McCarthy and R.E.M.	2001
"Christmas (Baby Please Come Home)"	fanclub single	Jeff Barry, Ellie Greenwich, Phil Spector		2010
"Christmas Griping"	fanclub single	Bill Berry, Peter Buck, Mike Mills, Michael Stipe		1991
"Christmas Time (Is Here Again)"	fanclub single	John Lennon, Paul McCartney, George Harrison, Richard Starkey		2000
"Christmas Time Is Here"	fanclub single	Lee Mendelson, Vince Guaraldi		1993
"Christmas in Tunisia"	fanclub single	Bill Berry, Peter Buck, Mike Mills, Michael Stipe		1994
"Circus Envy"	Monster	Bill Berry, Peter Buck, Mike Mills, Michael Stipe	Scott Litt and R.E.M.	1994
"Country Feedback"	Out of Time	Bill Berry, Peter Buck, Mike Mills, Michael Stipe	Scott Litt and R.E.M.	1991
"Crazy"	"Driver 8" single	Randy Bewley, Vanessa Briscoe, Curtis Crowe, Michael Lachowski	Joe Boyd	1985
"Crazy Like a Fox"	fanclub single	Lenny Kaye		2009
"Crush with Eyeliner"	Monster	Bill Berry, Peter Buck, Mike Mills, Michael Stipe	Scott Litt and R.E.M.	1994
"Cuyahoga"	Lifes Rich Pageant	Bill Berry, Peter Buck, Mike Mills, Michael Stipe	Don Gehman	1986
"Dallas" (live) (featuring Billy Bragg, Clive Gregson & Christine Collister)	Out of Time (25th Anniversary Deluxe Edition)	Peter Buck, Mike Mills, Michael Stipe		2016
"Dark Globe"	"Orange Crush" single	Syd Barrett	Scott Litt and R.E.M.	1988
"Daysleeper"	Up	Peter Buck, Mike Mills, Michael Stipe	Pat McCarthy and R.E.M.	1998
"Deck the Halls"	Winter Warnerland	traditional	Greg Lee, Jeff Smith, and R.E.M.	1988
"Departure"	New Adventures in Hi-Fi	Bill Berry, Peter Buck, Mike Mills, Michael Stipe	Scott Litt and R.E.M.	1996
"Devil Rides Backwards" (Demo)	Automatic for the People 25th Anniversary Deluxe Edition	Bill Berry, Peter Buck, Mike Mills, Michael Stipe	Scott Litt and R.E.M.	2017
"Diminished"	Up	Peter Buck, Mike Mills, Michael Stipe	Pat McCarthy and R.E.M.	1998
"Disappear"	Reveal	Peter Buck, Mike Mills, Michael Stipe	Pat McCarthy and R.E.M.	2001
"Discoverer"	Collapse into Now	Peter Buck, Mike Mills, Michael Stipe	Jacknife Lee and R.E.M.	2011
"Disturbance at the Heron House"	Document	Bill Berry, Peter Buck, Mike Mills, Michael Stipe	Scott Litt and R.E.M.	1987
"(Don't Go Back To) Rockville"	Reckoning	Bill Berry, Peter Buck, Mike Mills, Michael Stipe	Don Dixon, Mitch Easter	1984
"Draggin' the Line"	Austin Powers: The Spy Who Shagged Me soundtrack	Tommy James, Bob King	Pat McCarthy and R.E.M.	1999
"Drive"	Automatic for the People	Bill Berry, Peter Buck, Mike Mills, Michael Stipe	Scott Litt and R.E.M.	1992
"Driver 8"	Fables of the Reconstruction	Bill Berry, Peter Buck, Mike Mills, Michael Stipe	Joe Boyd	1985
"E-Bow the Letter"	New Adventures in Hi-Fi	Bill Berry, Peter Buck, Mike Mills, Michael Stipe	Scott Litt and R.E.M.	1996
"Eastern 983111" (Demo)	Automatic for the People 25th Anniversary Deluxe Edition	Bill Berry, Peter Buck, Mike Mills, Michael Stipe	Scott Litt and R.E.M.	2017
"Electrolite"	New Adventures in Hi-Fi	Bill Berry, Peter Buck, Mike Mills, Michael Stipe	Scott Litt and R.E.M.	1996
"Electron Blue"	Around the Sun	Peter Buck, Mike Mills, Michael Stipe	Pat McCarthy and R.E.M.	2004
"Emphysema"	"Daysleeper" single	Peter Buck, Mike Mills, Michael Stipe	Pat McCarthy and R.E.M.	1998
"Endgame"	Out of Time	Bill Berry, Peter Buck, Mike Mills, Michael Stipe	Scott Litt and R.E.M.	1991
"Every Day Is Yours to Win"	Collapse into Now	Peter Buck, Mike Mills, Michael Stipe	Jacknife Lee and R.E.M.	2011
"Everybody Hurts"	Automatic for the People	Bill Berry, Peter Buck, Mike Mills, Michael Stipe	Scott Litt and R.E.M.	1992
"Exhuming McCarthy"	Document	Bill Berry, Peter Buck, Mike Mills, Michael Stipe	Scott Litt and R.E.M.	1987
"Fall on Me"	Lifes Rich Pageant	Bill Berry, Peter Buck, Mike Mills, Michael Stipe	Don Gehman	1986
"Falls to Climb"	Up	Peter Buck, Mike Mills, Michael Stipe	Pat McCarthy and R.E.M.	1998
"Fascinating"	Officially released in 2019 through a Bandcamp download to support Hurricane Dorian Relief. See Reveal Advance 2001 for more information on unofficial release through the fansite murmurs.com.	Peter Buck, Mike Mills, Michael Stipe	Pat McCarthy and R.E.M.	2019
"Favorite Writer"	"Bad Day" single	Linda Hopper, Ruthie Morris	Pat McCarthy and R.E.M.	2003
"Feeling Gravitys Pull"	Fables of the Reconstruction	Bill Berry, Peter Buck, Mike Mills, Michael Stipe	Joe Boyd	1985
"Femme Fatale"	"Superman" single	Lou Reed	Scott Litt and R.E.M.	1986
"Final Straw"	Around the Sun	Peter Buck, Mike Mills, Michael Stipe	Pat McCarthy and R.E.M.	2004
"Find the River"	Automatic for the People	Bill Berry, Peter Buck, Mike Mills, Michael Stipe	Scott Litt and R.E.M.	1992
"Finest Worksong"	Document	Bill Berry, Peter Buck, Mike Mills, Michael Stipe	Scott Litt and R.E.M.	1987
"Fireplace"	Document	Bill Berry, Peter Buck, Mike Mills, Michael Stipe	Scott Litt and R.E.M.	1987
"First We Take Manhattan"	I'm Your Fan Leonard Cohen tribute album	Leonard Cohen	Scott Litt and R.E.M.	1991
"The Flowers of Guatemala"	Lifes Rich Pageant	Bill Berry, Peter Buck, Mike Mills, Michael Stipe	Don Gehman	1986
"Forty Second Song"	"Shiny Happy People" single	Bill Berry, Peter Buck, Mike Mills, Michael Stipe	Scott Litt and R.E.M.	1991
"Fretless"	Until the End of the World soundtrack	Bill Berry, Peter Buck, Mike Mills, Michael Stipe	Scott Litt and R.E.M.	1991
"Fruity Organ"	"Man on the Moon" single	Bill Berry, Peter Buck, Mike Mills, Michael Stipe	Scott Litt and R.E.M.	1992
"Funtime"	"Get Up" single	Iggy Pop	Scott Litt and R.E.M.	1989
"Gardening at Night"	Chronic Town	Bill Berry, Peter Buck, Mike Mills, Michael Stipe	Mitch Easter and R.E.M.	1982
"Gentle on My Mind" (Live)	Sounds Eclectic: The Covers Project	John Hartford		2007
"Get Up"	Green	Bill Berry, Peter Buck, Mike Mills, Michael Stipe	Scott Litt and R.E.M.	1988
"Ghost Reindeer in the Sky"	fanclub single	Stan Jones		1990
"Ghost Rider"	"Orange Crush" single	Martin Reverby, Alan Vega	Scott Litt and R.E.M.	1988
"Good Advices"	Fables of the Reconstruction	Bill Berry, Peter Buck, Mike Mills, Michael Stipe	Joe Boyd	1985
"Good King Wenceslas"	fanclub single	Traditional		1989
"The Great Beyond"	Man on the Moon soundtrack	Peter Buck, Mike Mills, Michael Stipe	Pat McCarthy and R.E.M.	1999
"Green Grow the Rushes"	Fables of the Reconstruction	Bill Berry, Peter Buck, Mike Mills, Michael Stipe	Joe Boyd	1985
"Hairshirt"	Green	Bill Berry, Peter Buck, Mike Mills, Michael Stipe	Scott Litt and R.E.M.	1988
"Half a World Away"	Out of Time	Bill Berry, Peter Buck, Mike Mills, Michael Stipe	Scott Litt and R.E.M.	1991
"Hallelujah"	Part Lies, Part Heart, Part Truth, Part Garbage 1982–2011	Peter Buck, Mike Mills, Michael Stipe	Jacknife Lee and R.E.M.	2011
"Harborcoat"	Reckoning	Bill Berry, Peter Buck, Mike Mills, Michael Stipe	Don Dixon, Mitch Easter	1984
"Hastings and Main"	fanclub single	Peter Buck, Mike Mills, Michael Stipe, Ken Stringfellow, Scott McCaughey, Joey Waronker		2000
"High Speed Train"	Around the Sun	Peter Buck, Mike Mills, Michael Stipe	Pat McCarthy and R.E.M.	2004
"Hollow Man"	Accelerate	Peter Buck, Mike Mills, Michael Stipe	Jacknife Lee and R.E.M.	2008
"Hope"	Up	Leonard Cohen, Peter Buck, Mike Mills, Michael Stipe	Pat McCarthy and R.E.M.	1998
"Horse to Water"	Accelerate	Peter Buck, Mike Mills, Michael Stipe	Jacknife Lee and R.E.M.	2008
"Houston"	Accelerate	Peter Buck, Mike Mills, Michael Stipe	Jacknife Lee and R.E.M.	2008
"How the West Was Won and Where It Got Us"	New Adventures in Hi-Fi	Bill Berry, Peter Buck, Mike Mills, Michael Stipe	Scott Litt and R.E.M.	1996
"Hyena"	Lifes Rich Pageant	Bill Berry, Peter Buck, Mike Mills, Michael Stipe	Don Gehman	1986
"I Believe"	Lifes Rich Pageant	Bill Berry, Peter Buck, Mike Mills, Michael Stipe	Don Gehman	1986
"I Don't Sleep, I Dream"	Monster	Bill Berry, Peter Buck, Mike Mills, Michael Stipe	Scott Litt and R.E.M.	1994
"I Remember California"	Green	Bill Berry, Peter Buck, Mike Mills, Michael Stipe	Scott Litt and R.E.M.	1988
"I Took Your Name"	Monster	Bill Berry, Peter Buck, Mike Mills, Michael Stipe	Scott Litt and R.E.M.	1994
"I Walked with a Zombie"	Where the Pyramid Meets the Eye: A Tribute to Roky Erickson	Roky Erickson	Scott Litt and R.E.M.	1990
"I Wanted to Be Wrong"	Around the Sun	Peter Buck, Mike Mills, Michael Stipe	Pat McCarthy and R.E.M.	2004
"I Will Survive"	fanclub single	Freddie Perren, Dino Fekaris		1996
"Ignoreland"	Automatic for the People	Bill Berry, Peter Buck, Mike Mills, Michael Stipe	Scott Litt and R.E.M.	1992
"Iht->U->Ediytw (Dubmix)"	fanclub single	Peter Buck, Mike Mills, Michael Stipe		2010
"I'll Take the Rain"	Reveal	Peter Buck, Mike Mills, Michael Stipe	Pat McCarthy and R.E.M.	2001
"I'm Gonna DJ"	Accelerate	Peter Buck, Mike Mills, Michael Stipe	Emer Patten	2008
"Imitation of Life"	Reveal	Peter Buck, Mike Mills, Michael Stipe	Pat McCarthy and R.E.M.	2001
"Indian Summer"	"Hollow Man" single	Calvin Johnson	Jacknife Lee and R.E.M.	2008
"It Happened Today"	Collapse into Now	Peter Buck, Mike Mills, Michael Stipe	Jacknife Lee and R.E.M.	2011
"It's a Free World, Baby"	Coneheads soundtrack	Bill Berry, Peter Buck, Mike Mills, Michael Stipe	Scott Litt and R.E.M.	1993
"It's the End of the World As We Know It (And I Feel Fine)"	Document	Bill Berry, Peter Buck, Mike Mills, Michael Stipe	Scott Litt and R.E.M.	1987
"I've Been High"	Reveal	Peter Buck, Mike Mills, Michael Stipe	Pat McCarthy and R.E.M.	2001
"Java"	fanclub single	Allen Toussaint, Freddy Friday, Alvin Tyler		1995
"Jesus Christ"	fanclub single	Alex Chilton		2002
"Just a Touch"	Lifes Rich Pageant	Bill Berry, Peter Buck, Mike Mills, Michael Stipe	Don Gehman	1986
"King of Birds"	Document	Bill Berry, Peter Buck, Mike Mills, Michael Stipe	Scott Litt and R.E.M.	1987
"King of Comedy"	Monster	Bill Berry, Peter Buck, Mike Mills, Michael Stipe	Scott Litt and R.E.M.	1994
"King of the Road"	"So. Central Rain (I'm Sorry)" single	Roger Miller	Don Dixon, Mitch Easter	1984
"Kohoutek"	Fables of the Reconstruction	Bill Berry, Peter Buck, Mike Mills, Michael Stipe	Joe Boyd	1985
"Last Date"	"The One I Love" single	Floyd Cramer	Scott Litt and R.E.M.	1987
"Laughing"	Murmur	Bill Berry, Peter Buck, Mike Mills, Michael Stipe	Don Dixon, Mitch Easter	1983
"Leave"	New Adventures in Hi-Fi, A Life Less Ordinary Soundtrack	Bill Berry, Peter Buck, Mike Mills, Michael Stipe	Scott Litt and R.E.M.	1996
"Leaving New York"	Around the Sun	Peter Buck, Mike Mills, Michael Stipe	Pat McCarthy and R.E.M.	2004
"Let Me In"	Monster	Bill Berry, Peter Buck, Mike Mills, Michael Stipe	Scott Litt and R.E.M.	1994
"Letter Never Sent"	Reckoning	Bill Berry, Peter Buck, Mike Mills, Michael Stipe	Don Dixon, Mitch Easter	1984
"Life and How to Live It"	Fables of the Reconstruction	Bill Berry, Peter Buck, Mike Mills, Michael Stipe	Joe Boyd	1985
"The Lifting"	Reveal	Peter Buck, Mike Mills, Michael Stipe	Pat McCarthy and R.E.M.	2001
"Lightnin' Hopkins"	Document	Bill Berry, Peter Buck, Mike Mills, Michael Stipe	Scott Litt and R.E.M.	1987
"The Lion Sleeps Tonight"	"The Sidewinder Sleeps Tonite" single	Solomon Linda, Hugo Peretti, Luigi Creatore, George David Weiss, Albert Stanton	Scott Litt and R.E.M.	1993
"Little America"	Reckoning	Bill Berry, Peter Buck, Mike Mills, Michael Stipe	Don Dixon, Mitch Easter	1984
"Live for Today"	fanclub single	Bill Berry, Peter Buck, Mike Mills, Michael Stipe		1997
"Living Well Is the Best Revenge"	Accelerate	Peter Buck, Mike Mills, Michael Stipe	Jacknife Lee and R.E.M.	2008
"Living Well Jesus Dog"	"Man-Sized Wreath" single	Peter Buck, Mike Mills, Michael Stipe	Jacknife Lee and R.E.M.	2008
"Losing My Religion"	Out of Time	Bill Berry, Peter Buck, Mike Mills, Michael Stipe	Scott Litt and R.E.M.	1991
"Lotus"	Up	Peter Buck, Mike Mills, Michael Stipe	Pat McCarthy and R.E.M.	1998
"Love Is All Around"	I Shot Andy Warhol soundtrack	Reg Presley	Scott Litt and R.E.M.	1996
"Low"	Out of Time	Bill Berry, Peter Buck, Mike Mills, Michael Stipe	Scott Litt and R.E.M.	1991
"Low Desert"	New Adventures in Hi-Fi	Bill Berry, Peter Buck, Mike Mills, Michael Stipe	Scott Litt and R.E.M.	1996
"Magnetic North"	fanclub single	Peter Buck, Mike Mills, Michael Stipe		2007
"Make It All Okay"	Around the Sun	Peter Buck, Mike Mills, Michael Stipe	Pat McCarthy and R.E.M.	2004
"Man on the Moon"	Automatic for the People	Bill Berry, Peter Buck, Mike Mills, Michael Stipe	Scott Litt and R.E.M.	1992
"Mandolin Strum"	"Everybody Hurts" single	Bill Berry, Peter Buck, Mike Mills, Michael Stipe	Scott Litt and R.E.M.	1993
"Man-Sized Wreath"	Accelerate	Peter Buck, Mike Mills, Michael Stipe	Jacknife Lee and R.E.M.	2008
"Maps and Legends"	Fables of the Reconstruction	Bill Berry, Peter Buck, Mike Mills, Michael Stipe	Joe Boyd	1985
"Me in Honey"	Out of Time	Bill Berry, Peter Buck, Mike Mills, Michael Stipe	Scott Litt and R.E.M.	1991
"Me, Marlon Brando, Marlon Brando and I"	Collapse into Now	Peter Buck, Mike Mills, Michael Stipe	Jacknife Lee and R.E.M.	2011
"Memphis Train Blues"	"Stand" single	Bill Berry, Peter Buck, Mike Mills, Michael Stipe	Scott Litt and R.E.M.	1989
"Merry Xmas Everybody"	fanclub single	James Lea, Neville Holder	David Barbe and R.E.M.	2007
"Mike’s Pop Song" (Demo)	Automatic for the People 25th Anniversary Deluxe Edition	Bill Berry, Peter Buck, Mike Mills, Michael Stipe	Scott Litt and R.E.M.	2017
"Mine Smell Like Honey"	Collapse into Now	Peter Buck, Mike Mills, Michael Stipe	Jacknife Lee and R.E.M.	2011
"Mr. Richards"	Accelerate	Peter Buck, Mike Mills, Michael Stipe	Jacknife Lee and R.E.M.	2008
"Monty Got a Raw Deal"	Automatic for the People	Bill Berry, Peter Buck, Mike Mills, Michael Stipe	Scott Litt and R.E.M.	1992
"Moon River"	Reckoning 1992 I.R.S. Vintage Years reissue	Johnny Mercer		1992
"Moral Kiosk"	Murmur	Bill Berry, Peter Buck, Mike Mills, Michael Stipe	Don Dixon, Mitch Easter	1983
"Munich" (Live)	Radio 1's Live Lounge – Volume 3	Chris Urbanowicz, Edward Lay, Russell Leetch, Tom Smith		2008
"Mystery to Me" (Demo)	And I Feel Fine... The Best of the I.R.S. Years 1982–1987	Bill Berry, Peter Buck, Mike Mills, Michael Stipe	Don Gehman	2006
"Near Wild Heaven"	Out of Time	Bill Berry, Peter Buck, Mike Mills, Michael Stipe	Scott Litt and R.E.M.	1991
"New Orleans Instrumental No. 1"	Automatic for the People	Bill Berry, Peter Buck, Mike Mills, Michael Stipe	Scott Litt and R.E.M.	1992
"New Orleans Instrumental No. 2"	"Man on the Moon" single	Bill Berry, Peter Buck, Mike Mills, Michael Stipe	Scott Litt and R.E.M.	1992
"New Test Leper"	New Adventures in Hi-Fi	Bill Berry, Peter Buck, Mike Mills, Michael Stipe	Scott Litt and R.E.M.	1996
"Nightswimming"	Automatic for the People	Bill Berry, Peter Buck, Mike Mills, Michael Stipe	Scott Litt and R.E.M.	1992
"No Matter What"	fanclub single	Pete Ham		2002
"Nola-4/26/2010"	"Oh My Heart" single	Peter Buck, Mike Mills, Michael Stipe	Jacknife Lee and R.E.M.	2011
"Oddfellows Local 151"	Document	Bill Berry, Peter Buck, Mike Mills, Michael Stipe	Scott Litt and R.E.M.	1987
"Oh My Heart"	Collapse into Now	Peter Buck, Mike Mills, Michael Stipe, Scott McCaughey	Jacknife Lee and R.E.M.	2011
"Old Man Kensey"	Fables of the Reconstruction	Jerry Ayers, Bill Berry, Peter Buck, Mike Mills, Michael Stipe	Joe Boyd	1985
"On the Fly" (Live)	Live at The Olympia	Peter Buck, Mike Mills, Michael Stipe	Jacknife Lee	2009
"The One I Love"	Document	Bill Berry, Peter Buck, Mike Mills, Michael Stipe	Scott Litt and R.E.M.	1987
"Only in America"	fanclub single	Jerry Leiber, Mike Stoller		1996
"Orange Crush"	Green	Bill Berry, Peter Buck, Mike Mills, Michael Stipe	Scott Litt and R.E.M.	1988
"Organ Song"	"The Sidewinder Sleeps Tonite" single	Bill Berry, Peter Buck, Mike Mills, Michael Stipe	Scott Litt and R.E.M.	1993
"Out in the Country"	"Bad Day" single	Paul Williams, Roger Nichols	Pat McCarthy and R.E.M.	2003
"Out of Tune" (Demo)	Lifes Rich Pageant 25th Anniversary Deluxe Edition	Peter Buck, Mike Mills, Michael Stipe		2011
"The Outsiders"	Around the Sun	Peter Buck, Mike Mills, Michael Stipe	Pat McCarthy and R.E.M.	2004
"Pale Blue Eyes"	"So. Central Rain (I'm Sorry)" single	Lou Reed	Don Dixon, Mitch Easter	1984
"Parade of the Wooden Soldiers"	fanclub single	Modest Mussorgsky		1988
"Parakeet"	Up	Peter Buck, Mike Mills, Michael Stipe	Pat McCarthy and R.E.M.	1998
"The Passenger" (Live)	"At My Most Beautiful" single	Iggy Pop	Pat McCarthy and R.E.M.	1999
"Perfect Circle"	Murmur	Bill Berry, Peter Buck, Mike Mills, Michael Stipe	Don Dixon, Mitch Easter	1983
"Permanent Vacation"	iTunes Originals – R.E.M.	Bill Berry, Peter Buck, Mike Mills, Michael Stipe	Pat McCarthy and R.E.M.	2004
"Photograph" (with Natalie Merchant)	Born to Choose compilation album	Berry, Buck, Mills, Stipe, Merchant		1993
"Pilgrimage"	Murmur	Bill Berry, Peter Buck, Mike Mills, Michael Stipe	Don Dixon, Mitch Easter	1983
"Pop Song 89"	Green	Bill Berry, Peter Buck, Mike Mills, Michael Stipe	Scott Litt and R.E.M.	1988
"Pretty Persuasion"	Reckoning	Bill Berry, Peter Buck, Mike Mills, Michael Stipe	Don Dixon, Mitch Easter	1984
"Radio Free Europe" (Hib-Tone version)	"Radio Free Europe" (Hib-Tone single)	Bill Berry, Peter Buck, Mike Mills, Michael Stipe	Mitch Easter	1981
"Radio Free Europe"	Murmur	Bill Berry, Peter Buck, Mike Mills, Michael Stipe	Don Dixon, Mitch Easter	1983
"Radio Song"	Out of Time	Bill Berry, Peter Buck, Mike Mills, Michael Stipe	Scott Litt and R.E.M.	1991
"Red Head Walking"	"Supernatural Superserious" single	Calvin Johnson	Jacknife Lee and R.E.M.	2008
"Revolution"	Batman & Robin soundtrack	Bill Berry, Peter Buck, Mike Mills, Michael Stipe	Scott Litt and R.E.M.	1997
"Rocker with Vocal" (Demo)	Monster 25th Anniversary Deluxe Edition	Bill Berry, Peter Buck, Mike Mills, Michael Stipe	Scott Litt and R.E.M.	2019
"Romance"	Made in Heaven soundtrack	Bill Berry, Peter Buck, Mike Mills, Michael Stipe	Scott Litt and R.E.M.	1987
"Rotary Eleven"	"Losing My Religion" single	Bill Berry, Peter Buck, Mike Mills, Michael Stipe	Scott Litt and R.E.M.	1991
"Rotary Ten"	"Fall on Me" single	Bill Berry, Peter Buck, Mike Mills, Michael Stipe	Don Gehman	1986
"Sad Professor"	Up	Peter Buck, Mike Mills, Michael Stipe	Pat McCarthy and R.E.M.	1998
"Santa Baby"	fanclub single	Joan Javits, Philip Springer, Tony Springer		2009
"Saturn Return"	Reveal	Peter Buck, Mike Mills, Michael Stipe	Pat McCarthy and R.E.M.	2001
"Second Guessing"	Reckoning	Bill Berry, Peter Buck, Mike Mills, Michael Stipe	Don Dixon, Mitch Easter	1984
"See No Evil"	fanclub single	Tom Verlaine		1988
"Sex Bomb"	fanclub single	Will Shatter		1994
"Shaking Through"	Murmur	Bill Berry, Peter Buck, Mike Mills, Michael Stipe	Don Dixon, Mitch Easter	1983
"She Just Wants to Be"	Reveal	Peter Buck, Mike Mills, Michael Stipe	Pat McCarthy and R.E.M.	2001
"Shiny Happy People"	Out of Time	Bill Berry, Peter Buck, Mike Mills, Michael Stipe	Scott Litt and R.E.M.	1991
"The Sidewinder Sleeps Tonite"	Automatic for the People	Bill Berry, Peter Buck, Mike Mills, Michael Stipe	Scott Litt and R.E.M.	1992
"Silver Bells"	fanclub single	Jay Livingston, Ray Evans		1993
"Sing for the Submarine"	Accelerate	Peter Buck, Mike Mills, Michael Stipe	Jacknife Lee and R.E.M.	2008
"Sitting Still" (Hib-Tone version)	"Radio Free Europe" (Hib-Tone single)	Bill Berry, Peter Buck, Mike Mills, Michael Stipe	Mitch Easter	1981
"Sitting Still"	Murmur	Bill Berry, Peter Buck, Mike Mills, Michael Stipe	Don Dixon, Mitch Easter	1983
"Skin Tight" (live)	"Stand" single	James Williams, Clarence Satchell, Leroy "Sugarfoot" Bonner, Marshall Jones, Ralph Middlebrooks, Marvin Pierce	Scott Litt and R.E.M.	1989
"Smokin' in the Boys Room" (live)	REMTV	Cub Koda, Michael Lutz		2014
"So Fast, So Numb"	New Adventures in Hi-Fi	Bill Berry, Peter Buck, Mike Mills, Michael Stipe	Scott Litt and R.E.M.	1996
"So. Central Rain (I'm Sorry)"	Reckoning	Bill Berry, Peter Buck, Mike Mills, Michael Stipe	Don Dixon, Mitch Easter	1984
"Sponge"	Sweet Relief II: Gravity of the Situation Vic Chesnutt tribute album	Vic Chesnutt	Scott Litt and R.E.M.	1996
"Stand"	Green	Bill Berry, Peter Buck, Mike Mills, Michael Stipe	Scott Litt and R.E.M.	1988
"Star 69"	Monster	Bill Berry, Peter Buck, Mike Mills, Michael Stipe	Scott Litt and R.E.M.	1994
"Star Me Kitten"	Automatic for the People	Bill Berry, Peter Buck, Mike Mills, Michael Stipe	Scott Litt and R.E.M.	1992
"Staring Down the Barrel of the Middle Distance" (live)	Live at The Olympia	Peter Buck, Mike Mills, Michael Stipe	Jacknife Lee	2009
"Strange"	Document	Bruce Gilbert, Graham Lewis, Colin Newman, Robert Gotobed	Scott Litt and R.E.M.	1987
"Strange Currencies"	Monster	Bill Berry, Peter Buck, Mike Mills, Michael Stipe	Scott Litt and R.E.M.	1994
"Stumble"	Chronic Town	Bill Berry, Peter Buck, Mike Mills, Michael Stipe	Mitch Easter and R.E.M.	1982
"Summer Turns to High"	Reveal	Peter Buck, Mike Mills, Michael Stipe	Pat McCarthy and R.E.M.	2001
"Summertime"	fanclub single	George Gershwin		1990
"Superman"	Lifes Rich Pageant	Gary Zekley, Mitchell Bottler	Don Gehman	1986
"Supernatural Superserious"	Accelerate	Peter Buck, Mike Mills, Michael Stipe	Jacknife Lee and R.E.M.	2008
"Surfing the Ganges"	"Lotus" single	Peter Buck, Mike Mills, Michael Stipe	Pat McCarthy and R.E.M.	1998
"Suspicion"	Up	Peter Buck, Mike Mills, Michael Stipe	Pat McCarthy and R.E.M.	1998
"Swan Swan H"	Lifes Rich Pageant	Bill Berry, Peter Buck, Mike Mills, Michael Stipe	Don Gehman	1986
"Sweetness Follows"	Automatic for the People	Bill Berry, Peter Buck, Mike Mills, Michael Stipe	Scott Litt and R.E.M.	1992
"Take Seven"	fanclub single	Peter Buck, Mike Mills, Michael Stipe		2000
"Talk About the Passion"	Murmur	Bill Berry, Peter Buck, Mike Mills, Michael Stipe	Don Dixon, Mitch Easter	1983
"Texarkana"	Out of Time	Bill Berry, Peter Buck, Mike Mills, Michael Stipe	Scott Litt and R.E.M.	1991
"That Someone Is You"	Collapse into Now	Peter Buck, Mike Mills, Michael Stipe	Jacknife Lee and R.E.M.	2011
"Theme from Two Steps Onward" (Demo)	And I Feel Fine... The Best of the I.R.S. Years 1982–1987	Bill Berry, Peter Buck, Mike Mills, Michael Stipe	Don Gehman	1987
"There She Goes Again"	"Radio Free Europe" single	Lou Reed	Don Dixon, Mitch Easter	1983
"These Days"	Lifes Rich Pageant	Bill Berry, Peter Buck, Mike Mills, Michael Stipe	Don Gehman	1986
"Throw Those Trolls Away" (Demo)	Fables of the Reconstruction (25th Anniversary Deluxe Edition)	Peter Buck, Mike Mills, Michael Stipe		2010
"Time After Time (Annelise)"	Reckoning	Bill Berry, Peter Buck, Mike Mills, Michael Stipe	Don Dixon, Mitch Easter	1984
"Tighten Up"	Bucketfull of Brains magazine	Archie Bell, Billy Buttier		1992
"Tired of Singing Trouble"	Lifes Rich Pageant I.R.S. Vintage Years reissue	Bill Berry, Peter Buck, Mike Mills, Michael Stipe		1986
"Tom's Diner" (live)	"Near Wild Heaven" single	Suzanne Vega	Scott Litt and R.E.M.	1991
"Tongue"	Monster	Bill Berry, Peter Buck, Mike Mills, Michael Stipe	Scott Litt and R.E.M.	1994
"Toyland"	fanclub single	Victor Herbert, Glen MacDonough		1992
"Toys in the Attic"	"Fall on Me" single	Steven Tyler, Joe Perry	Don Gehman	1986
"Tricycle"	"E-Bow the Letter" single	Bill Berry, Peter Buck, Mike Mills, Michael Stipe	Scott Litt and R.E.M.	1996
"Try Not to Breathe"	Automatic for the People	Bill Berry, Peter Buck, Mike Mills, Michael Stipe	Scott Litt and R.E.M.	1992
"Turn You Inside-Out"	Green	Bill Berry, Peter Buck, Mike Mills, Michael Stipe	Scott Litt and R.E.M.	1988
"Überlin"	Collapse into Now	Peter Buck, Mike Mills, Michael Stipe	Jacknife Lee and R.E.M.	2011
"Underneath the Bunker"	Lifes Rich Pageant	Bill Berry, Peter Buck, Mike Mills, Michael Stipe	Don Gehman	1986
"Undertow"	New Adventures in Hi-Fi	Bill Berry, Peter Buck, Mike Mills, Michael Stipe	Scott Litt and R.E.M.	1996
"Until the Day Is Done"	Accelerate	Peter Buck, Mike Mills, Michael Stipe	Jacknife Lee and R.E.M.	2008
"Voice of Harold"	"So. Central Rain (I'm Sorry)" single	Bill Berry, Peter Buck, Mike Mills, Michael Stipe	Don Dixon, Mitch Easter	1984
"The Wake-Up Bomb"	New Adventures in Hi-Fi	Bill Berry, Peter Buck, Mike Mills, Michael Stipe	Scott Litt and R.E.M.	1996
"Wait" (demo)	Lifes Rich Pageant (25th Anniversary Deluxe Edition)	Peter Buck, Mike Mills, Michael Stipe		2011
"Walk It Back"	Collapse into Now	Peter Buck, Mike Mills, Michael Stipe	Jacknife Lee and R.E.M.	2011
"Walk Unafraid"	Up	Peter Buck, Mike Mills, Michael Stipe	Pat McCarthy and R.E.M.	1998
"Wall of Death"	Beat the Retreat Richard Thompson tribute album	Richard Thompson	Scott Litt and R.E.M.	1995
"Walter's Theme"	"So. Central Rain (I'm Sorry)" single	Bill Berry, Peter Buck, Mike Mills, Michael Stipe	Don Dixon, Mitch Easter	1984
"Wanderlust"	Around the Sun	Peter Buck, Mike Mills, Michael Stipe	Pat McCarthy and R.E.M.	2004
"We All Go Back to Where We Belong"	Part Lies, Part Heart, Part Truth, Part Garbage 1982–2011	Peter Buck, Mike Mills, Michael Stipe	Jacknife Lee and R.E.M.	2011
"We Walk"	Murmur	Bill Berry, Peter Buck, Mike Mills, Michael Stipe	Don Dixon, Mitch Easter	1983
"Welcome to the Occupation"	Document	Bill Berry, Peter Buck, Mike Mills, Michael Stipe	Scott Litt and R.E.M.	1987
"Wendell Gee"	Fables of the Reconstruction	Bill Berry, Peter Buck, Mike Mills, Michael Stipe	Joe Boyd	1985
"West of the Fields"	Murmur	Bill Berry, Peter Buck, Mike Mills, Michael Stipe, Neil Bogan	Don Dixon, Mitch Easter	1983
"What If We Give It Away?"	Lifes Rich Pageant	Bill Berry, Peter Buck, Mike Mills, Michael Stipe	Don Gehman	1986
"What's the Frequency, Kenneth?"	Monster	Bill Berry, Peter Buck, Mike Mills, Michael Stipe	Scott Litt and R.E.M.	1994
"Where's Captain Kirk?"	fanclub single	Mark Coalfield, Kenneth Spiers		1992
"White Tornado"	"Superman" single	Bill Berry, Peter Buck, Mike Mills, Michael Stipe	Don Gehman	1986
"Why Not Smile"	Up	Peter Buck, Mike Mills, Michael Stipe	Pat McCarthy and R.E.M.	1998
"Wichita Lineman" (Live)	"Bittersweet Me" single	Jimmy Webb	Scott Litt and R.E.M.	1996
"Wicked Game"	fanclub single	Chris Isaak		1995
"Wind Out"	Bachelor Party soundtrack	Bill Berry, Peter Buck, Mike Mills, Michael Stipe	Don Dixon, Mitch Easter	1984
"Winged Mammal Theme"	"Drive" single	Bill Berry, Peter Buck, Mike Mills, Michael Stipe	Scott Litt and R.E.M.	1992
"Wolves, Lower"	Chronic Town	Bill Berry, Peter Buck, Mike Mills, Michael Stipe	Mitch Easter and R.E.M.	1982
"World Leader Pretend"	Green	Bill Berry, Peter Buck, Mike Mills, Michael Stipe	Scott Litt and R.E.M.	1988
"The Worst Joke Ever"	Around the Sun	Peter Buck, Mike Mills, Michael Stipe	Pat McCarthy and R.E.M.	2004
"The Wrong Child"	Green	Bill Berry, Peter Buck, Mike Mills, Michael Stipe	Scott Litt and R.E.M.	1988
"Yellow River"	"All the Way to Reno (You're Gonna Be a Star)" single	Jeff Christie	Pat McCarthy and R.E.M.	2001
"You"	Monster	Bill Berry, Peter Buck, Mike Mills, Michael Stipe	Scott Litt and R.E.M.	1994
"You Are the Everything"	Green	Bill Berry, Peter Buck, Mike Mills, Michael Stipe	Scott Litt and R.E.M.	1988
"You're in the Air"	Up	Peter Buck, Mike Mills, Michael Stipe	Pat McCarthy and R.E.M.	1998
"Zither"	New Adventures in Hi-Fi	Bill Berry, Peter Buck, Mike Mills, Michael Stipe	Scott Litt and R.E.M.	1996
