= Unplugged: The Complete 1991 and 2001 Sessions =

Live R.E.M. album released in 2014

Live album by R.E.M.
- Released: April 19, 2014
- Recorded: April 10, 1991; May 21, 2001
- Venue: Chelsea Studios, New York City, New York, US; TRL Studio at MTV Studios, New York City, New York, US
- Genre: Alternative rock
- Length: 134:56
- Label: Rhino

R.E.M. chronology
| Part Lies, Part Heart, Part Truth, Part Garbage 1982–2011 (2011) | Unplugged: The Complete 1991 and 2001 Sessions (2014) | Complete Rarities: I.R.S. 1982–1987 (2014) |

Unplugged: The Complete 1991 and 2001 Sessions is a 2014 live album from alternative rock band R.E.M., released initially on vinyl recordings through Rhino Records for Record Store Day, and later made available on compact disc and digitally. The album is composed of two performances that the band made on the U.S. television show MTV Unplugged. Among the album's 33 tracks are 11 performances which were not aired on either broadcast. To promote the album, Mike Mills signed copies at independent record store Bull Moose in Scarborough, Maine. Video of the concerts was released later that year on REMTV.

== Reception ==
=== Critical reception ===
Professional ratings
Aggregate scores
| Source | Rating |
|---|---|
| Metacritic | 73 |
Review scores
| Source | Rating |
| Allmusic | 3.5/5 stars |
| American Songwriter | 4.5/5 stars |
| Clash | 6/10 |
| Drowned in Sound | 7/10 |
| Popmatters | 7/10 |
| Rolling Stone | 4/5 stars |

According to the review aggregator Metacritic, Unplugged: The Complete 1991 and 2001 Sessions received "generally favorable reviews" based on a weighted average score of 73 out of 100 from 10 critic scores. Andrzej Lukowski of Drowned in Sound gave the album a positive review, commenting that R.E.M. was "a great live band, and the acoustic format is a fine showcase for Stipe's remarkable voice" and "1991 and 2001 complement each other well, as contrasting mood pieces". Rolling Stone's Will Hermes gave the album four out of five stars remarking, "No band but Nirvana made more breathtakingly transformative use of MTV Unplugged than R.E.M." Mike Diver of Clash considers the album inessential in R.E.M.'s catalogue but still welcome and a "fan-pleasing release". Similarly, Stephen Thomas Erlewine of Allmusic calls this release a "treat for hardcore R.E.M. fans" and contrasts the baroque pop of the 2001 set with the folk rock of the 1991 performance. Alternately, American Songwriter's Lynne Margolis considers the album an important document of R.E.M.'s history writing, "By stripping their work to its most elemental form, this collection expresses their artistry in a truly definitive way."

=== Sales ===
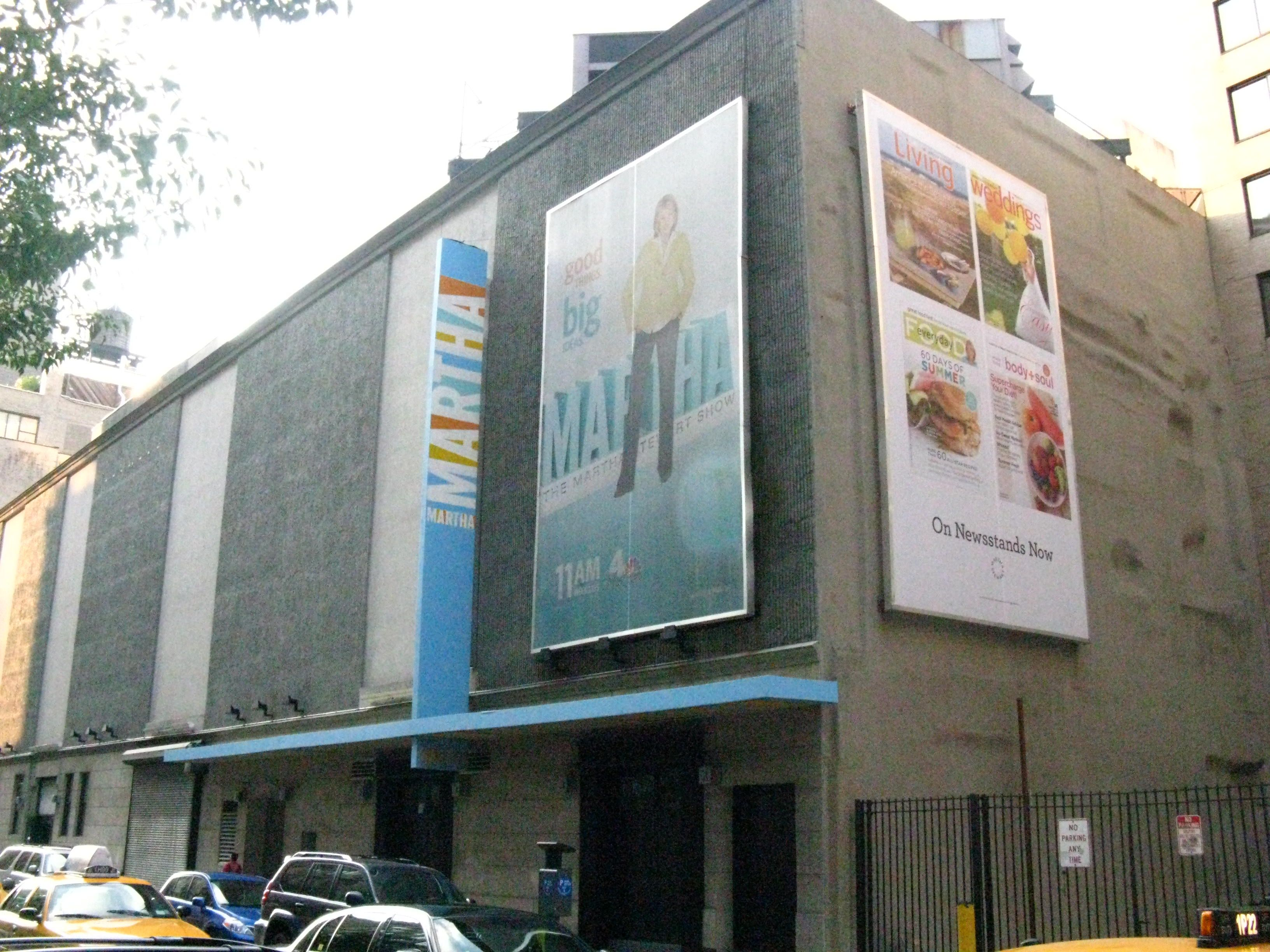
Chelsea Studios was the home for taping MTV Unplugged when R.E.M. performed in 1991

The album debuted at number 21 on the Billboard 200 in late May 2014 after having its wide-scale release on compact disc and digital download. It also peaked at number 27 on the Italian Albums Chart.

== Track listing ==
All songs written by Bill Berry, Peter Buck, Mike Mills, and Michael Stipe, except as indicated.

=== Disc 1 (1991 Unplugged) ===
1. "Half a World Away" (from Out of Time) – 3:58
2. "Disturbance at the Heron House" (from Document) – 3:47
3. "Radio Song" (from Out of Time) – 4:19
4. "Low" (from Out Of Time) – 5:09
5. "Perfect Circle" (from Murmur) – 4:13
6. "Fall on Me" (from Lifes Rich Pageant) – 3:21
7. "Belong" (from Out of Time) – 4:30
8. "Love Is All Around" (Reg Presley) (cover) – 3:22
9. "It's the End of the World as We Know It (And I Feel Fine)" (from Document) – 4:36
10. "Losing My Religion" (from Out of Time) – 4:53
11. "Pop Song 89" (from Green) – 3:28
12. "Endgame" (from Out of Time) – 3:41
13. "Fretless" (from Until the End of the World soundtrack) – 5:33
14. "Swan Swan H" (from Lifes Rich Pageant) – 3:00
15. "Rotary Eleven" (from "Losing My Religion") – 1:48
16. "Get Up" (from Green) – 2:53
17. "World Leader Pretend" (from Green) – 4:57

=== Disc 2 (2001 Unplugged) ===
1. "All the Way to Reno (You're Gonna Be a Star)" (Buck, Mills, Stipe) (from Reveal) – 4:27
2. "Electrolite" (from New Adventures in Hi-Fi) – 4:05
3. "At My Most Beautiful" (Buck, Mills, Stipe) (from Up) – 3:25
4. "Daysleeper" (Buck, Mills, Stipe) (from Up) – 3:12
5. "So. Central Rain (I'm Sorry)" (from Reckoning) – 4:05
6. "Losing My Religion" (from Out of Time) – 4:43
7. "Country Feedback" (Berry, Buck, Mills, Stipe, Bob Dylan)^{1} (from Out of Time) – 5:25
8. "Cuyahoga" (from Lifes Rich Pageant) – 4:30
9. "Imitation of Life" (Buck, Mills, Stipe) (from Reveal) – 4:12
10. "Find the River" (from Automatic for the People) – 3:59
11. "The One I Love" (from Document) – 3:33
12. "Disappear" (Buck, Mills, Stipe) (from Reveal) – 4:00
13. "Beat a Drum" (Buck, Mills, Stipe) (from Reveal) – 4:27
14. "I've Been High" (Buck, Mills, Stipe) (from Reveal) – 3:20
15. "I'll Take the Rain" (Buck, Mills, Stipe) (from Reveal) – 5:36
16. "Sad Professor" (Buck, Mills, Stipe) (from Up) – 4:29

=== Notes ===
^{1} Although uncredited, the Unplugged rendition of "Country Feedback" contains lines from "Like a Rolling Stone", written by Bob Dylan.

== Personnel ==
R.E.M.

- Bill Berry – congas, tambourine, bass guitar, backing vocals (1991 performance)
- Peter Buck – acoustic guitar, mandolin; banjo, bass guitar (2001 performance)
- Mike Mills – bass guitar, backing vocals; Hammond organ, lead vocals on "Love Is All Around" (1991); piano, acoustic guitar, pump organ (2001)
- Michael Stipe – vocals, cover art design

Additional musicians

- Peter Holsapple – guitar, bass guitar, Hammond organ (1991)
- Scott McCaughey – piano, acoustic guitar, vibraphone, pump organ backing vocals (2001)
- Ken Stringfellow – piano, acoustic guitar, backing vocals (2001)
- Joey Waronker – drums, percussion (2001)

Technical personnel

Note that this list excludes the television executives credited with creating the television program

- Chris Bellman – mastering
- Chris Bilheimer – package design
- Jamie Candiloro – engineering
- Carol Field – art direction
- Todd Kilponen – engineering
- Scott Litt – engineering
- Pat McCarthy – audio supervision, remixing
- Tom McPhillips – production design
- Joe O'Herlihy – engineering
- David Vanderhayden – mixing
