= R.e.m.IX =

r.e.m.IX
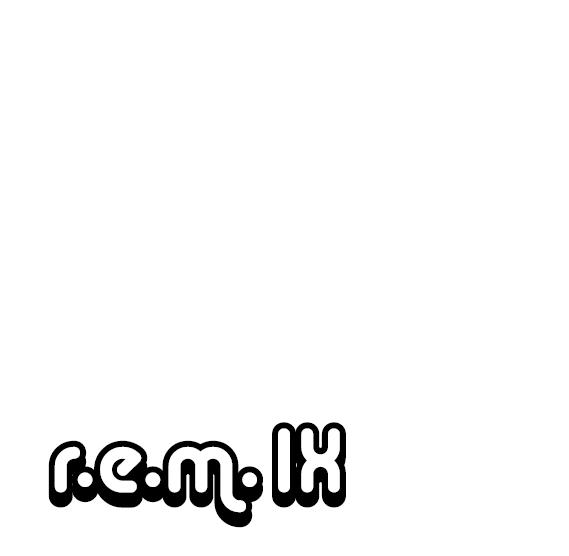

Remix album by R.E.M.
- Released: 2002
- Recorded: 2000
- Genre: Electronica, trip hop, broken beat, house music
- Length: 51:00
- Label: Warner Bros.
- Producer: Pat McCarthy and several remixers

R.E.M. chronology
Reveal (2001)	r.e.m.IX (2002)	In Time: The Best of R.E.M. 1988–2003 (2003)

r.e.m.IX is a 2002 remix album of songs by R.E.M. from its 2001 album Reveal. Copies of that album were given to well-known remixers to see what they could do with its tracks and the band's favorite results were compiled to form this album. Out of the twelve original tracks on Reveal, six are found among the ten tracks on this album—there are two different versions of "The Lifting" and four of "I've Been High." "I'll Take the Rain" was the only one of Reveals three singles to be included on r.e.m.IX.

The album has never been commercially released, but it was made available as a free download from the band's Web site and as a promotional Compact Disc and vinyl LP from Warner Bros. Records. This was the second promotional music download from R.E.M. (after Not Bad for No Tour) and was intended to introduce their music to a wider audience.

== Critical reception ==
The album received mixed-to-poor reviews. Flak Magazine's James Norton praised it for the precedent it sets for other artists to release free music, but considers the music "stuffy" and lacking fun. Mark Reed of Drowned in Sound agreed that the music was boring and both reviewers criticized the apparently random track listing and choice of remixes.

== Track listing ==
All songs written by Peter Buck, Mike Mills, and Michael Stipe

1. "The Lifting" (Now It's Overhead mix by Andy Lemaster) – 4:41
2. "The Lifting" (Knobody/Dahoud Darien for 12 Nations) – 5:07
3. "I'll Take the Rain" (Jamie Candiloro) – 6:11
4. "She Just Wants to Be" (Jamie Candiloro) – 5:03
5. "I've Been High" (Matthew "Intended" Herbert) – 5:19
6. "I've Been High" (Knobody/Dahoud Darien for 12 Nations) – 4:01
7. "I've Been High" (Chef) – 4:56
8. "I've Been High" (Her Space Holiday/Marc Bianchi) – 5:01
9. "Beachball" (Chef) – 6:16
10. "Summer Turns to High" (Her Space Holiday/Marc Bianchi) – 4:25
