= In Time: The Best of R.E.M. 1988–2003 =

2003 compilation album by R.E.M.

Greatest hits album by R.E.M.
- Released: October 27, 2003
- Recorded: 1988–2003
- Genre: Alternative rock
- Length: 76:15
- Label: Warner Bros.
- Producers: Scott Litt, Pat McCarthy, R.E.M.

R.E.M. chronology
r.e.m.IX (2002)	In Time: The Best of R.E.M. 1988–2003 (2003)	In View: The Best of R.E.M. 1988–2003 (2003)

Singles from In Time: The Best of R.E.M. 1988–2003
- 1. "Bad Day" Released: September 29, 2003; 2. "Animal" Released: January 5, 2004

R.E.M. compilations chronology
R.E.M.: In the Attic – Alternative Recordings 1985–1989 (1997)	In Time: The Best of R.E.M. 1988–2003 (2003)	iTunes Originals – R.E.M. (2004)

Professional ratings
Review scores
Source	Rating
AllMusic	4/5 stars
The Encyclopedia of Popular Music	5/5 stars
Entertainment Weekly	A−
NME	6/10
Pitchfork Media	7.5/10
Rolling Stone	4/5 stars
RTÉ.ie	5/5 stars
Stylus Magazine	A

In Time: The Best of R.E.M. 1988–2003 is the second official compilation album released by R.E.M. Issued in 2003, it includes tracks from their Warner Bros. Records era, from 1988's Green to 2001's Reveal, as well as two new recordings and two songs from movie soundtracks. The album was the tenth-best-selling album of 2003 in the UK, and the 50th-best-selling album of the 2000s in the UK.

== Background ==
"Bad Day" was a demo version in 1986, a Lifes Rich Pageant outtake when Bill Berry was still in the band, and was re-recorded for this compilation. "Animal" was a recent song written for their upcoming studio album. Similarly, "All the Right Friends", originally written in the early 1980s, had been re-recorded by the band for use in Cameron Crowe's 2001 film Vanilla Sky. Finally, "The Great Beyond" was initially issued in 1999 as part of Miloš Forman's film on Andy Kaufman, Man on the Moon. It ended up becoming the band's biggest UK hit, with a No. 3 peak, in early 2000. This, the third inclusion of the song on an official release, is the only unedited version. On the Man on the Moon soundtrack, there is some dialogue from the movie at the end of the track; the single version is a radio edit, with the bridge omitted.

In Time: The Best of R.E.M. 1988–2003 was also issued in a limited two-disc edition that included a "Rarities and B-Sides" disc from the same era, with liner notes by Peter Buck. The single-disc edition of the album reached No. 1 in the UK, while going platinum in the U.S. and peaking at #8. The limited-edition two-disc release managed to reach No. 16 in the U.S. and No. 37 in the UK. There is also a vinyl edition which consists of two LPs inside a gatefold cover and a limited CD box-set edition featuring all eighteen tracks on their own individual one-track CDs, with cover art from the original singles.

A notable omission from the album is the song "Shiny Happy People" which was deliberately left out by the band despite it being one of their biggest hits.

A companion DVD, entitled In View: The Best of R.E.M. 1988–2003, was released at the same time. In 2005, Warner Bros. Records issued an expanded two-disc edition of the compilation which included a CD, a DVD-Audio disc containing a 5.1-channel surround sound mix of the album done by Elliot Scheiner, and the original CD booklet with expanded liner notes. The "Rarities and B-Sides" bonus disc from the limited edition is not included in this package.

== Track listing ==
All songs written by Bill Berry, Peter Buck, Mike Mills and Michael Stipe except as indicated.

1. "Man on the Moon" (from Automatic for the People, 1992) – 5:12
2. "The Great Beyond" (Buck, Mills, Stipe) (from the Man on the Moon soundtrack, 1999) – 5:04
3. "Bad Day" (previously unreleased) – 4:05
4. "What's the Frequency, Kenneth?" (from Monster, 1994) – 3:58
5. "All the Way to Reno (You're Gonna Be a Star)" (Buck, Mills, Stipe) (from Reveal, 2001) – 4:43
6. "Losing My Religion" (from Out of Time, 1991) – 4:26
7. "E-Bow the Letter" (from New Adventures in Hi-Fi, 1996) – 5:22
8. "Orange Crush" (from Green, 1988) – 3:50
9. "Imitation of Life" (Buck, Mills, Stipe) (from Reveal, 2001) – 3:56
10. "Daysleeper" (Buck, Mills, Stipe) (from Up, 1998) – 3:37
11. "Animal" (Buck, Mills, Stipe) (previously unreleased) – 4:00
12. "The Sidewinder Sleeps Tonite" (from Automatic for the People, 1992) – 4:06
13. "Stand" (from Green, 1988) – 3:09
14. "Electrolite" (from New Adventures in Hi-Fi, 1996) – 4:04
15. "All the Right Friends" (from the Vanilla Sky soundtrack, 2001) – 2:45
16. "Everybody Hurts" (from Automatic for the People, 1992) – 5:17
17. "At My Most Beautiful" (Buck, Mills, Stipe) (from Up, 1998) – 3:33
18. "Nightswimming" (from Automatic for the People, 1992) – 4:16

Bonus disc 'Rarities and B-sides'

1. "Pop Song 89" (acoustic) – 2:56
  - B-side of "Pop Song 89" 7 Inch; 1989
2. "Turn You Inside-Out" (live) – 4:16
  - although listed on the cover as being from the live video Tourfilm (which version was also released as B-side of "Losing My Religion" "Collector's Editions" CD 1), this recording is actually from the radio broadcast of the Orlando show from April 30, 1989, previously included on a "Get Up" promotional CD-single.
3. "Fretless" – 4:49
  - B-side of "Losing My Religion" "Collector's Editions" CD 2, Until the End of the World soundtrack, B-side of "The Sidewinder Sleeps Tonite" "Collector's Edition" CD 1 UK; 1991
4. "Chance (Dub)" – 2:33
  - B-side of "Everybody Hurts" "Collector's Edition" CD 2 UK; 1993
5. "It's a Free World, Baby" – 5:11
  - B-side of "Drive" "Collector's Edition" Single UK & the Coneheads soundtrack; 1992
6. "Drive" (live, November 19, 1992) – 3:59
  - Alternative NRG, B-side of "Strange Currencies" CD single; 1994
7. "Star Me Kitten" (featuring William S. Burroughs) – 3:29
  - Songs in the Key of X: Music from and Inspired by the X-Files; 1996
8. "Revolution" – 3:02
  - Batman & Robin soundtrack; 1997
9. "Leave" (alternate version) – 4:40
  - A Life Less Ordinary soundtrack; 1997
10. "Why Not Smile" (Oxford American version) (Buck, Mills, Stipe) – 2:59
  - B-side of "Daysleeper" CD single; 1998
11. "The Lifting" (original version) (Buck, Mills, Stipe) – 5:19
  - B-side of "Imitation of Life" CD single; 2001
12. "Beat a Drum" (Dalkey demo) (Buck, Mills, Stipe) – 4:25
  - B-side of "Imitation of Life" CD single; 2001
13. "2JN" (Buck, Mills, Stipe) – 3:24
  - B-side of "Imitation of Life" CD single; 2001
14. "The One I Love" (live from the Museum of Television and Radio, June 8, 2001) – 3:23
  - previously unreleased
15. "Country Feedback" (live from Wiesbaden, Germany, 2003) – 6:15
  - previously unreleased

Later pressings of the collector's edition have the second disc enhanced with the "Bad Day" video.

== Charts ==
=== Weekly charts ===
2003 Weekly sales performance for In Time: The Best of R.E.M. 1988–2003
Chart (2003)	Peak position
Australian Albums (ARIA)	5
Austrian Albums (Ö3 Austria)	1
Belgian Albums (Ultratop Flanders)	1
Belgian Albums (Ultratop Wallonia)	8
Danish Albums (Hitlisten)	1
Dutch Albums (Album Top 100)	7
European Albums (Billboard)	2
Finnish Albums (Suomen virallinen lista)	8
German Albums (Offizielle Top 100)	1
Hungarian Albums (MAHASZ)	38
Irish Albums (IRMA)	1
Italian Albums (FIMI)	1
Norwegian Albums (VG-lista)	1
New Zealand Albums (RMNZ)	2
Portuguese Albums (AFP)	4
Scottish Albums (Official Charts)	1
South African Albums (RISA)	4
Swedish Albums (Sverigetopplistan)	1
Swiss Albums (Schweizer Hitparade)	1
UK Albums (Official Charts)	1
US Billboard 200	8

2006 Weekly sales performance for In Time: The Best of R.E.M. 1988–2003
Chart (2006)	Peak position
Spanish Albums (Promusicae)	40

=== Year-end charts ===
2003 Annual sales performance for In Time: The Best of R.E.M. 1988–2003
Chart (2003)	Position
Australian Albums (ARIA)	38
Austrian Albums (Ö3 Austria)	16
Belgian Albums (Ultratop Flanders)	12
Belgian Alternative Albums (Ultratop Flanders)	6
Belgian Albums (Ultratop Wallonia)	87
Danish Albums (Hitlisten)	11
Dutch Albums (Album Top 100)	70
German Albums (Offizielle Top 100)	51
Irish Albums (IRMA)	4
Italian Albums (FIMI)	9
Swedish Albums (Sverigetopplistan)	12
Swedish Albums & Compilations (Sverigetopplistan)	17
Swiss Albums (Schweizer Hitparade)	15
UK Albums (OCC)	10
Worldwide Albums (IFPI)	17

2004 Annual sales performance for In Time: The Best of R.E.M. 1988–2003
Chart (2004)	Position
Australian Albums (ARIA)	44
Austrian Albums (Ö3 Austria)	68
Belgian Albums (Ultratop Flanders)	68
Belgian Alternative Albums (Ultratop Flanders)	41
German Albums (Offizielle Top 100)	65
Italian Albums (FIMI)	52
Swedish Albums (Sverigetopplistan)	89
Swiss Albums (Schweizer Hitparade)	76
UK Albums (OCC)	86

2005 Annual sales performance for In Time: The Best of R.E.M. 1988–2003
Chart (2005)	Position
UK Albums (OCC)	98

=== Decade-end charts ===
Decade sales performance for In Time: The Best of R.E.M. 1988–2003
Chart (2000–09)	Position
Australian Albums (ARIA)	80
UK Albums (OCC)	50

== Certifications and sales ==
Certifications and sales for In Time: The Best of R.E.M. 1988–2003
Region	Certification	Certified units/sales
Australia (ARIA)	4× Platinum	280,000^{^}
Austria (IFPI Austria)	Platinum	30,000^{*}
Belgium (BRMA)	2× Platinum	100,000^{*}
Czech Republic	—	10,000
Denmark (IFPI Danmark)	2× Platinum	80,000^{^}
Germany (BVMI)	2× Platinum	400,000^{^}
Greece (IFPI Greece)	Platinum	20,000^{^}
Ireland (IRMA)	7× Platinum	105,000^{^}
Italy (FIMI) sales in 2003	Platinum	100,000^{*}
Italy (FIMI) sales since 2009	Gold	30,000^{*}
Netherlands (NVPI)	Gold	40,000^{^}
New Zealand (RMNZ)	2× Platinum	30,000^{^}
Norway	—	140,000
Portugal (AFP)	Gold	20,000^{^}
South Africa (RISA)	Gold	25,000^{*}
Spain (Promusicae)	Platinum	100,000^{^}
Sweden (GLF)	Gold	30,000^{^}
Switzerland (IFPI Switzerland)	Platinum	40,000^{^}
United Kingdom (BPI)	5× Platinum	1,697,004
United States (RIAA)	Platinum	1,000,000^{^}
Summaries
Europe (IFPI)	3× Platinum	3,000,000^{*}
^{*} Sales figures based on certification alone.^{^} Shipments figures based on certification alone.
