= I'll Take the Rain =

2001 single by R.E.M

Single by R.E.M.

from the album Reveal
- B-side: "32 Chord Song"
- Released: November 19, 2001
- Length: 5:51
- Label: Warner Bros.
- Songwriter(s): Peter Buck; Mike Mills; Michael Stipe
- Producer(s): Pat McCarthy; R.E.M.

R.E.M. singles chronology
"All the Way to Reno (You're Gonna Be a Star)" (2001)	"I'll Take the Rain" (2001)	"Bad Day" (2003)

"I'll Take the Rain" is the third and final single from American rock band R.E.M.'s 12th studio album, Reveal (2001). Released on November 19, 2001, the song reached number 44 on the UK Singles Chart but failed to chart elsewhere. The song was included on the album r.e.m.IX and also performed on MTV Unplugged in 2001.

== Music video ==
The single's music video, directed by David Weir, represented the first time the band has released an entirely animated music video. The clip is suitably moody to match the pace of the song, and follows the adventures of a crown-bearing dog and a living wooden cart (shown on the single cover) as they explore an island.

== Track listings ==
All songs were written by Peter Buck, Mike Mills, and Michael Stipe.

UK CD1 (W573CD)

1. "I'll Take the Rain" – 5:55
2. "I've Been High" (Live) – 3:20^{1}
3. "She Just Wants to Be" (Live) – 5:06^{2}

UK CD2 (W573CDX)

1. "I'll Take the Rain" – 5:55
2. "32 Chord Song" – 3:12 ^{3}
3. "I've Been High" (Live) (enhanced video)^{1}

European CD (9362-42416-2)

1. "I'll Take the Rain"
2. "32 Chord Song" – 3:12
3. "She Just Wants to Be" (Live) – 5:06
4. "I've Been High" (Live) – 3:20
5. "I've Been High" (Live) (enhanced video)

=== Notes ===
^{1} Recorded at Channel V Studios, Sydney, Australia; May 31, 2001.
^{2} Recorded at the Museum of Television and Radio, New York City, New York; May 18, 2001.
^{3} Alternative version of "Summer Turns to High" from Reveal.

== Charts ==
Chart (2001)	Peak position
Scotland (OCC)	44
UK Singles (OCC)	44
