= The Great Beyond =

1999 single by R.E.M.

Single by R.E.M.

from the album Man on the Moon (Music from the Motion Picture)
- B-side: "Man on the Moon" (live); "The One I Love" (live); "Everybody Hurts" (live)
- Released: November 8, 1999
- Genre: Alternative rock
- Length: 5:06 (album version); 4:14 (radio edit)
- Label: Warner Bros.; Jersey
- Songwriters: Peter Buck; Mike Mills; Michael Stipe
- Producer: Pat McCarthy

R.E.M. singles chronology
"Suspicion" (1999)	"The Great Beyond" (1999)	"Imitation of Life" (2001)

Music video
- "The Great Beyond" on YouTube

"The Great Beyond" is a song by American rock band R.E.M., written for the 1999 film Man on the Moon. It was released as a single the same year for support of the film's soundtrack album. On the soundtrack, there is some dialogue from the movie at the end of the track; meanwhile, the single version is a radio edit, with the bridge omitted.

"The Great Beyond" reached number three on the UK Singles Chart in January 2000, becoming the band's highest chart position in that country, and it became a top-20 hit in Canada, Iceland, Ireland, Italy, and Norway. At the 43rd Annual Grammy Awards in 2001, the song was nominated for Best Song Written for a Motion Picture, Television or Other Visual Media. The unedited version is included in two R.E.M. compilations: In Time - The Best of R.E.M. 1988–2003 and Part Lies, Part Heart, Part Truth, Part Garbage 1982–2011.

== Background and content ==
According to the book Perfect Circle: The Story of R.E.M., the band employed their then-usual live musicians when recording the song: "To record the single, the group convened at John Keane's. Joey Waronker was brought in on drums; Scott McCaughey and Ken Stringfellow were each invited to take part; Pat McCarthy returned to the producer's chair."

In the unedited version, at 4:09 and at 4:26, the listener can hear Michael Stipe singing the following lines in the background: "Here's a little agit for the never-believer, here's a little ghost for the offering". Both lines were taken from the band's 1992 song "Man on the Moon", also about Andy Kaufman, from which the film took its title.

== Music video ==
The song's video was directed by Liz Friedlander. It originally featured footage of Jim Carrey as Andy Kaufman from the 1999 film. Yet, in the compilation DVD In View: The Best of R.E.M. 1988-2003 (which accompanied In Time and collected R.E.M.'s major videos from 1988 to 2003), the video was remixed to feature archived footage of Kaufman himself (similar to the video for "Man on the Moon"). The original version can be seen on the Man on the Moon DVD. Carrey revealed in the 2017 documentary Jim & Andy: The Great Beyond that he had been invited to appear in the video in person, but refused, as he wished to psychologically distance himself from the Kaufman character; he stated that he now regretted the decision.

== Track listings ==
All songs were written by Bill Berry, Peter Buck, Mike Mills, and Michael Stipe, except for "The Great Beyond", written by Buck, Mills, and Stipe. All live track were recorded on June 25, 1999, at the Glastonbury Festival.

- US CD, 7-inch, and cassette single

UK cassette single

1. "The Great Beyond" (edit)
2. "Man on the Moon" (live at Glastonbury)
- US maxi-CD single

Japanese CD single

1. "The Great Beyond" (edit)
2. "The One I Love" (live at Glastonbury)
3. "Everybody Hurts" (live at Glastonbury)
4. "Man on the Moon" (live at Glastonbury)
- UK and European CD single
1. "The Great Beyond" (radio edit) – 4:13
2. "Everybody Hurts" (live from Glastonbury) – 6:21
3. "The One I Love" (live from Glastonbury) – 3:10

== Charts ==
=== Weekly charts ===
Chart (1999–2000)	Peak position
Australia (ARIA)	25
Canada Top Singles (RPM)	16
Canada Adult Contemporary (RPM)	46
Canada Rock/Alternative (RPM)	4
Europe (Eurochart Hot 100)	11
Germany (GfK)	56
Iceland (Íslenski Listinn Topp 40)	4
Ireland (IRMA)	6
Italy (FIMI)	3
Netherlands (Single Top 100)	91
Norway (VG-lista)	8
Scottish Singles Sales (Official Charts)	1
Sweden (Sverigetopplistan)	52
Switzerland (Schweizer Hitparade)	72
UK Singles (Official Charts)	3
US Billboard Hot 100	57
US Adult Alternative Airplay (Billboard)	1
US Adult Pop Airplay (Billboard)	13
US Alternative Airplay (Billboard)	11
US Mainstream Rock Airplay (Billboard)	33

=== Year-end charts ===
Chart (2000)	Position
Iceland (Íslenski Listinn Topp 40)	39
Ireland (IRMA)	59
UK Singles (OCC)	94
US Adult Top 40 (Billboard)	43
US Modern Rock Tracks (Billboard)	50
US Triple-A (Billboard)	9

== Release history ==
Region	Date	Format(s)	Label(s)	Ref(s).
United States	November 8, 1999	Adult contemporary; modern adult contemporary radio	Warner Bros.; Jersey	
United States	November 9, 1999	Mainstream rock; active rock; alternative radio	Warner Bros.; Jersey	
United States	December 7, 1999	Contemporary hit radio	Warner Bros.; Jersey	
Canada	December 21, 1999	CD	Warner Bros.; Jersey	
United Kingdom	January 24, 2000	CD; cassette	Warner Bros.; Jersey	
Japan	January 26, 2000	CD	Warner Bros.	

== Other versions ==
In June 2003, Michael Stipe sang an a cappella excerpt from the song for a BBC Radio 2 advertisement. He performed it on a stage in an empty theater. Welsh progressive breakbeat producers Hybrid later would use this a cappella to create a bootleg remix. A live version of this song is included on R.E.M. Live. The song was covered by The Fray in 2007 for the compilation album Radio 1: Established 1967.
