= Imitation of Life (song) =

2001 single by R.E.M.

Single by R.E.M.

from the album Reveal
- B-side: "The Lifting" (original); "Beat a Drum" (Dalkey demo); "2JN"
- Released: April 16, 2001
- Studio: The Warehouse (Vancouver, British Columbia); John Kean (Athens, Georgia); The Dalkey Lodge (Dublin, Ireland); The Hit Factory Criteria (Miami, Florida)
- Genre: Jangle pop
- Length: 3:57
- Label: Warner Bros.
- Songwriters: Peter Buck; Mike Mills; Michael Stipe
- Producers: Pat McCarthy; R.E.M.

R.E.M. singles chronology
"The Great Beyond" (2000)	"Imitation of Life" (2001)	"All the Way to Reno (You're Gonna Be a Star)" (2001)

Music video
- "Imitation of Life" on YouTube

"Imitation of Life" is a song by American alternative rock band R.E.M. It was written by band members Peter Buck, Mike Mills, and Michael Stipe and produced by the band with Pat McCarthy for their 12th studio album, Reveal (2001). The track's title comes from Douglas Sirk's 1959 film of the same name and is used as a metaphor for adolescence and adulthood. One of R.E.M.'s most pop-influenced tracks, "Imitation of Life" has been described lyrically as "see[ing] through the puffed-up performance of a hopeful entertainer", as well as the enjoyment of love.

R.E.M. chose to release "Imitation of Life" as the first single from Reveal due to its commercial potential. The song was serviced to European radio in March 2001 and was issued commercially worldwide between April and July 2001. Upon its release, the song received positive reviews from music critics, who were more complimentary toward the instrumentation than the lyrical content. Commercially, the single peaked at number 83 on the US Billboard Hot 100 and topped the Billboard Triple-A chart for three weeks. Internationally, "Imitation of Life" reached number six on the UK Singles Chart, giving R.E.M. their ninth top-10 single in Britain. It was also successful in Italy, Norway, and Spain, reaching the top five in these counties, and it charted within the top 40 throughout Europe and Australia.

At the 44th Annual Grammy Awards in 2002, the song was nominated for Best Pop Performance by a Duo or Group with Vocals, losing to U2's "Stuck in a Moment You Can't Get Out Of". A music video directed by Garth Jennings was made to promote the song. Filmed in Calabasas, California, in February 2001, the video uses a series of cameras and pan and scan techniques to create a 20-second clip of a pool party scene in which various incidents occur in both forward and reverse time. Critics praised the video for its concept, and it was nominated for two awards at the 2001 MTV Video Music Awards, losing in both categories to Fatboy Slim's "Weapon of Choice".

== Background and release ==
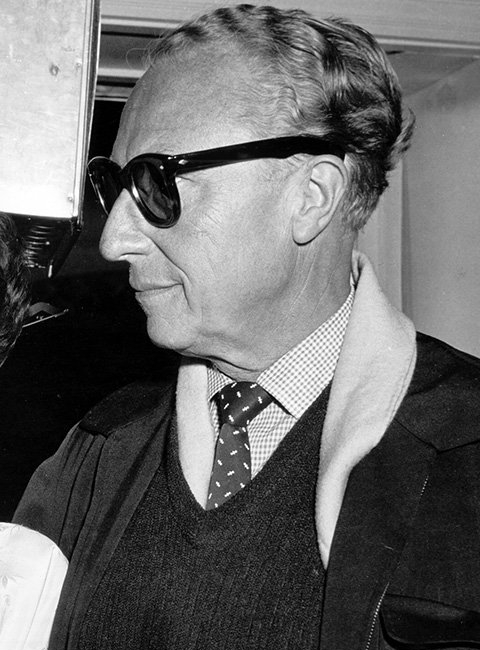
The song's title was inspired by the film Imitation of Life, directed by German filmmaker Douglas Sirk (pictured).

In the booklet for R.E.M.'s 2003 "best of" album, In Time: The Best of R.E.M. 1988–2003, the band states that the song's title comes from Douglas Sirk's 1959 film of the same name, which none of the band members had ever watched, and that the title is a metaphor for adolescence and adulthood. The notes also say that after the release of the song, the band realized that it follows roughly the same chord progression as "Driver 8" from their third studio album, Fables of the Reconstruction (1985). The song was almost excluded from Reveal because it was too much like the rest of the album, but during the mixing process, the band decided to set it apart by turning it into an up-tempo track. R.E.M. chose to release "Imitation of Life" as the first single from Reveal because it was the "poppiest" track on the album and possessed their "classic" sound. Along with the rest of the album, R.E.M. recorded the song at four locations: The Warehouse Studio in Vancouver, British Columbia; John Keane Studios in Athens, Georgia; The Dalkey Lodge in Dublin, Ireland; and The Hit Factory Criteria in Miami, Florida.

Warner Bros. Records first serviced the song to European radio on March 23, 2001. Two weeks later, on April 9 and 10, the label sent the song to several American radio formats, including hot adult contemporary, mainstream rock, active rock, and alternative. The single received its first commercial release on April 16, 2001, when a maxi-CD single was issued in Australia containing three additional tracks: the original version of "The Lifting", a demo of "Beat a Drum" recorded at The Dalkey Lodge, and "2JN". Seven days later, another CD single was distributed across continental Europe—this one containing only "2JN" as an additional track—and a maxi-CD with the same track listing as the Australian format was also released. The single then went on sale in the United Kingdom on April 30, 2001, as a CD and cassette single; the CD omits "2JN" while the cassette contains the same tracks as the European CD. A DVD single was also issued in the UK, Europe, Australia, and Japan, featuring the "Imitation of Life" video plus audio of "2JN" and "The Lifting". In the United States, an enhanced version of the maxi-CD that includes the video and a limited-edition orange-colored 12-inch vinyl single were distributed on May 8, 2001. Reveal was released on May 14, 2001, on which "Imitation of Life" is included as the eighth track.

== Composition ==
"Imitation of Life"
A 19-second sample of the chorus of "Imitation of Life", illustrating the song's "jangly" instrumentation. The drumming is the result of a machine rather than a session drummer.

Featuring a jangle pop sound similar to their early material, "Imitation of Life" has been described as R.E.M.'s most pop-sounding song at the time both by the band and from music critics, with the band noting that it encapsulates their characteristics well. Critics have compared the song to "Shiny Happy People" from the band's seventh studio album, Out of Time (1991), noting Peter Buck's "jangly" guitar-playing. On the song, Buck, Mike Mills, Scott McCaughey, and Ken Stringfellow play acoustic guitars, while a drum machine is used for the percussion, as ex-drummer Bill Berry left the band in 1997. R.E.M. and Johnny Tate arranged the track's strings while producer Pat McCarthy overdubbed them into the song. Stringfellow also added in the song's synthesizer solo. Stipe sings lead vocals and is backed by Mills.

Set in common time, "Imitation of Life" is composed in the key of G major with a tempo of 126 beats per minute. Lyrically, Jordan Stepp of online magazine God Is in the TV described the track as "see[ing] through the puffed-up performance of a hopeful entertainer," while Rob Sheffield of Rolling Stone magazine wrote that the song is about "the pleasures of love and their aftermath." The main chorus lyrics—"That sugarcane that tasted good / That's cinnamon, that's Hollywood / Come on, come on, no one can see you try"—are changed several times throughout the song, with Stipe repeating one variation until the track ends.

== Critical reception ==
Music critics praised "Imitation of Life". Reviewing the song for Billboard magazine, Troy Carpenter wrote that the absence of ex-R.E.M. drummer Bill Berry was noticeable, citing the "bombastic" instrumentation, and postulated that his departure changed R.E.M. completely, hence the adult pop sound of "Imitation of Life". He called Stipe's vocal performance on the song "uncharacteristically hollow" and noted that the transition to adult pop music would hurt the chances of the song garnering airplay on alternative radio. In a later Billboard review of the album, Larry Flick wrote that the song has "formidable bounce". British trade paper Music Week likened the song to R.E.M.'s Automatic for the People era, calling its production "lush" and noting Stipe's "yearning" vocals. Matt LeMay of Pitchfork Media wrote that the track's lyrics were "terrible" and that the song resembled R.E.M.'s 1999 song "The Great Beyond" but praised its hook and sound. Reviewing for the album for Rolling Stone, Sheffield proclaimed "Imitation of Life" R.E.M.'s "most beautiful" song since 1992's "Man on the Moon" and commending its goosebump-inducing instrumentation. AllMusic reviewer Stephen Thomas Erlewine called the song one of the better tracks on Reveal, referring to it as a "windswept and sun-bleached beaut[y]".

Miriam Hubner of Music & Media magazine wrote that the song was an undeniable R.E.M. track, calling Stipe's vocals "strong" and naming it an ideal driving song for the summer. She noted that radio station response was mixed; Sacha Horowitz of Swiss radio station Radio Lac said that although the Swiss people were fond of R.E.M., the band's sound had lost a vital component, obscuring their identity. Conversely, Michael Jørgensen, head of music at Danish station Radio Silkeborg, predicted that the song would be a spring hit, saying that R.E.M.'s sound had remained static and that the station's listeners were responding positively to the track. In 2002, at the 44th Annual Grammy Awards, the song was nominated for Best Pop Performance by a Duo or Group with Vocals, where it lost to "Stuck in a Moment You Can't Get Out Of" by U2. In a retrospective review of Reveal 20 years after its release, Stereogum writer Ryan Leas praised "Imitation of Life" for its relatable lyrics and "deeply catchy" composition that is neither too cheerful nor too depressing.

== Commercial performance ==
On May 26, 2001, "Imitation of Life" debuted on the US Billboard Hot 100 at number 83, which would become its peak; it was R.E.M.'s second single to debut at its peak, following "Electrolite" in 1997. Afterwards, the song spent five more weeks on the chart before leaving. The song gave R.E.M. their fourth number one on the Billboard Triple-A listing, topping the chart for three weeks and remaining in the top 20 for 19 issues. At the end of 2001, Billboard ranked it as the sixth-most-played triple-A track of the year. On the Adult Top 40, the song charted for 12 weeks, peaking at number 15 in June 2001 and finishing at number 59 on the listing's year-end ranking. "Imitation of Life" also appeared on the Modern Rock Tracks chart, where it reached number 22 and logged nine weeks on the listing.

In Canada, "Imitation of Life" charted on the Canadian Singles Chart for three issues—R.E.M.'s longest stay—and peaked at number five on the week of its debut. It went on to become Canada's 83rd-highest-selling physical single of 2001. On the UK Singles Chart, the song entered at its number-six peak on the week beginning May 6, 2001, giving R.E.M. their ninth top-10 hit and 25th top-40 hit in the United Kingdom. The single stayed in the top 100 for 13 weeks, giving R.E.M. their longest consecutive chart run on the UK chart and their second-longest run altogether, behind 1993's "Everybody Hurts". "Imitation of Life" finished 2001 at number 176 on the UK year-end ranking and was certified silver by the British Phonographic Industry (BPI) in July 2026 for sales and streaming units exceeding 200,000. In Ireland, the track appeared at its peak of number 12 on the Irish Singles Chart dated May 3, 2001, and it spent six weeks in the top 30.

Across continental Europe, "Imitation of Life" made top-10 debuts in Italy, Norway, Spain, entering directly at numbers three, four, and three, respectively. The song charted within the top 20 in Austria (number 19), Denmark (number 12), and Finland (number 14), and it rose to number 23 on the Netherlands' Dutch Top 40. Elsewhere, the single reached number 27 in Switzerland, number 32 in Sweden, number 35 in Germany, and number 99 in France. In Belgium, the track appeared on the Ultratip Bubbling Under charts, reaching number seven on Wallonia's Ultratip listing and number eight on Flanders'. On the Eurochart Hot 100, the single climbed to number 14 on the issue of May 19, 2001. In New Zealand, "Imitation of Life" peaked at number 18 during its 10th week on the RIANZ Singles Chart, spending a further four weeks on the ranking before leaving the top 50. The song entered the 40 in Australia, debuted at its peak of number 32 on April 29, 2001, and totaling three nonconsecutive weeks within the ARIA Singles Chart top 50. On the ARIA Alternative Chart, the song debuted and peaked at number 12 on July 2, 2001.

== Music video ==
A complete view of the music video's pool party setting. Throughout the video, the camera zooms in on various people. The members of R.E.M. can also be seen.

The music video for "Imitation of Life", depicting a scene of an elaborate pool party, was shot in Calabasas, California, on February 28, 2001. It was directed by Garth Jennings and produced by Nick Goldsmith. Wanting to try something different, Stipe has described the video's format as a "dead, dead form", taking inspiration from Polish director Zbigniew Rybczyński's 1981 film Tango. Jennings filmed the video using 12 Super 8 cameras, whose shots were subsequently merged to create one collective 20-second clip. During these 20 seconds, which both proceed normally and rewind, various people lip sync different parts of the song. Via pan and scan, the video zooms in on various bits of action, including a man catching fire from a barbecue, a woman having a drink thrown in her face, Stipe dancing, Mills pouring wine into a tower of glasses, and Buck playing a ukulele with a monkey in his lap.

At the 2001 MTV Video Music Awards, the video was nominated in two categories: Breakthrough Video and Best Direction, losing in both cases to the video for "Weapon of Choice" by Fatboy Slim. New York Press has described the video as a live-action Where's Waldo? puzzle and wrote that the video exposes the flaws of television editing without compromising its own cinematic merit. In 2011, Rolling Stone magazine included the video in their list of R.E.M.'s 15 greatest music videos. Technology website TNW noted that the video is one of the earliest precursors of a Vine clip. In 2006, Stylus Magazine ranked at video at number 66 on their list of the "Top 100 Music Videos of All Time".

== Accolades ==
Accolades for "Imitation of Life"
Year	Award	Category	Nominee(s)	Result	Ref.
2001	2001 MTV Video Music Awards	Breakthrough Video	Garth Jennings	Nominated	
2001	2001 MTV Video Music Awards	Best Direction	Garth Jennings	Nominated	
2002	44th Annual Grammy Awards	Best Pop Performance by a Duo or Group with Vocals	"Imitation of Life"	Nominated	

== Track listings ==
All songs were written by Peter Buck, Mike Mills, and Michael Stipe.

- US maxi-CD single
1. "Imitation of Life" – 3:52
2. "The Lifting" (original version) – 5:20
3. "Beat a Drum" (Dalkey demo) – 4:27
4. "2JN" – 3:25
5. "Imitation of Life" (video)
- US limited-edition 12-inch orange vinyl single

Canadian, European, Australian, and Japanese maxi-CD single

1. "Imitation of Life" – 3:52
2. "The Lifting" (original version) – 5:20
3. "Beat a Drum" (Dalkey demo) – 4:27
4. "2JN" – 3:25
- European CD and UK cassette single
1. "Imitation of Life" (album version) – 3:52
2. "2JN" – 3:25
- UK CD single
1. "Imitation of Life" (album version) – 3:52
2. "The Lifting" (original version) – 5:20
3. "Beat a Drum" (Dalkey demo) – 4:27
- UK, European, Australian, and Japanese DVD single
1. "Imitation of Life" (video) – 3:50
2. "2JN" (audio) – 3:25
3. "The Lifting" (audio) – 5:20

== Credits and personnel ==
Credits are adapted from Medialoper, the Reveal booklet, and the Australian maxi-CD single liner notes.

Studios

- Recorded at The Warehouse Studio (Vancouver, British Columbia), John Keane Studios (Athens, Georgia), The Dalkey Lodge (Dublin, Ireland), and The Hit Factory Criteria (Miami, Florida)
- Mastered at Gateway Mastering (Portland, Maine, US)

Personnel

- R.E.M. – production, string arrangements
  - Peter Buck – writing, guitars
  - Mike Mills – writing, backing vocals, acoustic guitar
  - Michael Stipe – writing, vocals
- Pat McCarthy – acoustic guitar, string overdubbing, production, recording, mixing
- Scott McCaughey – acoustic guitar
- Ken Stringfellow – acoustic guitar, synthesizer
- Jamie Candiloro – recording, mixing
- Johnny Tate – string arrangements
- Bob Ludwig – mastering

== Charts ==
=== Weekly charts ===
Weekly chart performance for "Imitation of Life"
Chart (2001)	Peak position
Australia (ARIA)	32
Australian Alternative (ARIA)	12
Austria (Ö3 Austria Top 40)	19
Belgium (Ultratip Bubbling Under Flanders)	8
Belgium (Ultratip Bubbling Under Wallonia)	7
Canada (Nielsen SoundScan)	5
Denmark (Tracklisten)	12
Europe (Eurochart Hot 100)	14
Finland (Suomen virallinen lista)	14
France (SNEP)	99
Germany (GfK)	35
Ireland (IRMA)	12
Italy (FIMI)	3
Netherlands (Dutch Top 40)	23
Netherlands (Single Top 100)	54
New Zealand (Recorded Music NZ)	18
Norway (VG-lista)	4
Poland Airplay (Music & Media)	9
Scottish Singles Sales (Official Charts)	5
Spain (Promusicae)	3
Sweden (Sverigetopplistan)	32
Switzerland (Schweizer Hitparade)	27
UK Singles (Official Charts)	6
US Billboard Hot 100	83
US Adult Alternative Airplay (Billboard)	1
US Adult Pop Airplay (Billboard)	15
US Alternative Airplay (Billboard)	22

=== Year-end charts ===
Year-end chart performance for "Imitation of Life"
Chart (2001)	Position
Canada (Nielsen SoundScan)	83
UK Singles (OCC)	176
US Adult Top 40 (Billboard)	59
US Triple-A (Billboard)	6

== Certifications ==
Certifications for "Imitation of Life"
Region	Certification	Certified units/sales
United Kingdom (BPI) Sales since 2004	Silver	200,000^{‡}
^{‡} Sales+streaming figures based on certification alone.

== Release history ==
Release dates and formats for "Imitation of Life"
Region	Date	Format	Label	ID	Ref.
Europe	March 23, 2001	Radio	Warner Bros.	—N/a	
United States	April 9, 2001	Hot adult contemporary radio	Warner Bros.	—N/a	
United States	April 10, 2001	Mainstream rock radio	Warner Bros.	—N/a	
United States	April 10, 2001	Active rock radio	Warner Bros.	—N/a	
United States	April 10, 2001	Alternative radio	Warner Bros.	—N/a	
Australia	April 16, 2001	Maxi-CD	Warner Bros.	9362449942	
Europe	April 23, 2001	CD	Warner Bros.	5439 16754 2	
Europe	April 23, 2001	Maxi-CD	Warner Bros.	9362 44994 2	
United Kingdom	April 30, 2001	CD	Warner Bros.	W559CD; 9362 44999 2	
United Kingdom	April 30, 2001	Cassette	Warner Bros.	W559C; 5439 16754 4	
United States	May 8, 2001	12-inch vinyl	Warner Bros.	0-42363	
United States	May 8, 2001	Maxi-CD	Warner Bros.	9 42363-2	
Japan	May 9, 2001	Maxi-CD	Warner Bros.	WPCR-11011	
Australia	June 25, 2001	DVD	Warner Bros.	7599385402	
Japan	July 11, 2001	DVD	Warner Bros.	WPBR-90032	
Canada	2001	Maxi-CD	Warner Bros.	CD 42363	
Europe	2001	DVD	Warner Bros.	7599385402	
United Kingdom	2001	DVD	Warner Bros.	W559DVD	
