= All the Way to Reno (You're Gonna Be a Star) =

2001 single by R.E.M.

Single by R.E.M.

from the album Reveal
- B-side: "165 Hillcrest"; "Yellow River"; "Imitation of Life" (live)
- Released: July 23, 2001
- Length: 4:43
- Label: Warner Bros.
- Songwriters: Peter Buck; Mike Mills; Michael Stipe
- Producers: Pat McCarthy; R.E.M.

R.E.M. singles chronology
"Imitation of Life" (2001)	"All the Way to Reno (You're Gonna Be a Star)" (2001)	"I'll Take the Rain" (2001)

"All the Way to Reno (You're Gonna Be a Star)" is a song by American rock band R.E.M. It was released on July 23, 2001 as the second single from the band's 12th studio album, Reveal (2001). The single reached number eight on the US Billboard Triple A chart and entered the 40 in Ireland, Italy, and the United Kingdom.

One of the single's B-sides is a live performance of "Imitation of Life" recorded at the South Africa Freedom Day concert at Trafalgar Square in London, England, which was held in honor of South African President Nelson Mandela. The event marked the seventh anniversary of democracy in South Africa.

== Background ==
According to Peter Buck's sleevenotes to In Time: The Best of R.E.M. 1988–2003, the R.E.M. compilation on which this song also appears, the song describes someone who believes they can get famous if they go to Reno, Nevada. The working title of the song was "Jimmy Webb on Mars," which, according to Buck's notes, was a "sick tribute to a songwriter who we all admire."

== Release ==
In 2023, Mike Mills named the song the best the band had released since Bill Berry left: "[It's] as good as anything we did after Bill left the band. All the parts work. Peter [Buck]'s composition is fantastic. The bass line is cool. The production is really, really good. It's encapsulated in that song. [It's] a little sad but it's also a little optimistic, like the best of Michael [Stipe]'s writing. It encompasses joy and tragedy. That song grabbed everything we were looking for."

== Music video ==
The song's video was shot at Bishop Ford Central Catholic High School in the Prospect Park area of Brooklyn, New York. It was directed by Michael Moore and filmed by four students from the host school and other local schools: Chris, 17; Steve, 17; Andy, 18; Charlotte, 13; Roger, 18; and Juan, 17. In the video, Buck and Mike Mills can be seen entering the career guidance office with their respective instruments in hand, only to leave armed with nothing more than a dustpan and brush. Bertis Downs makes an appearance as the school's announcer, only to have his microphone commandeered by Michael Stipe.

The video was included with the iTunes Store bonus music videos released along with Part Lies, Part Heart, Part Truth, Part Garbage 1982–2011, the band's swan song and career-spanning compilation. The song was not, however, included on the compilation itself.

== Track listings ==
All songs were written by Peter Buck, Mike Mills, and Michael Stipe except "Yellow River", written by Jeff Christie. "Imitation of Life" was recorded live at Trafalgar Square (London, England) on April 29, 2001.

UK CD single

1. "All the Way to Reno (You're Gonna Be a Star)" – 4:43
2. "Yellow River" – 2:33
3. "Imitation of Life" (live) – 4:36
4. "Imitation of Life" (live video)

UK DVD single

1. "All the Way to Reno (You're Gonna Be a Star)" (video) – 4:22
2. "Yellow River" (audio) – 2:34
3. "165 Hillcrest" (audio) – 1:34

UK cassette single and German CD single

1. "All the Way to Reno (You're Gonna Be a Star)" – 4:43
2. "165 Hillcrest" – 1:33

Australian and Japanese CD single

1. "All the Way to Reno (You're Gonna Be a Star)" – 4:45
2. "Yellow River" – 2:34
3. "165 Hillcrest" – 1:34
4. "Imitation of Life" (live) – 3:53
5. "Imitation of Life" (live video)

== Charts ==
Chart (2001)	Peak position
Europe (Eurochart Hot 100)	84
Germany (GfK)	92
Ireland (IRMA)	34
Italy (FIMI)	31
Scotland Singles (OCC)	20
UK Singles (OCC)	24
US Adult Alternative Airplay (Billboard)	8

== Release history ==
Region	Date	Format(s)	Label(s)	Ref.
United Kingdom	July 23, 2001	CD; cassette; DVD	Warner Bros.	
Australia	August 6, 2001	CD	Warner Bros.	
Japan	August 8, 2001	CD	Warner Bros.	
United States	August 13, 2001	Triple-A radio	Warner Bros.	
United States	August 14, 2001	Active rock; alternative radio	Warner Bros.	
Australia	September 3, 2001	DVD	Warner Bros.	
