= Reveal (R.E.M. album) =

Studio album by R.E.M.
- Released: May 14, 2001
- Studios: The Warehouse (Vancouver); John Keane (Athens); Dalkey Lodge (Dublin); Windmill Lane (Dublin); The Hit Factory / Criteria (Miami)
- Genres: Rock; electronic
- Length: 53:43
- Label: Warner Bros.
- Producers: Pat McCarthy; R.E.M.

R.E.M. chronology
Man on the Moon (1999)	Reveal (2001)	r.e.m.IX (2002)

Singles from Reveal
- 1. "Imitation of Life" Released: April 16, 2001; 2. "All the Way to Reno (You're Gonna Be a Star)" Released: July 23, 2001; 3. "I'll Take the Rain" Released: November 19, 2001

Reveal is the 12th studio album by American rock band R.E.M. It was released on May 14, 2001, through Warner Bros. Records and was the second of three albums by the band to be produced with Pat McCarthy. It was R.E.M.'s second album as a three-piece following the departure of drummer Bill Berry and includes contributions from the band's touring members Joey Waronker, Scott McCaughey and Ken Stringfellow. The band recorded the album in various locations, including Dublin, Miami, Vancouver, and their hometown of Athens, Georgia. The album saw R.E.M. continue to experiment with electronic music as they had on their previous album Up (1998), utilizing keyboards and drum machines, while also retaining elements of their earlier sound.

Reveal was a critical and commercial success. The album reached the top 10 in the United States while topping the charts in the UK and throughout mainland Europe. Three singles were released: "Imitation of Life," "All the Way to Reno (You're Gonna Be a Star)" and "I'll Take the Rain"—with the former reaching the top 10 throughout Europe. Reviews were generally positive, with many highlighting the album's melodic nature and combination of R.E.M.'s classic sound with electronic elements. The band did not tour in support of the album, with promotion consisting mainly of television appearances, music videos, and a number of free concerts within major cities.

== Background ==
In 1998, R.E.M. released Up, their eleventh studio album and first without drummer Bill Berry. While not as commercially successful as previous albums, it still sold well and spawned the hit singles "Daysleeper" and "At My Most Beautiful". The recording of Up was a troubled process, due in no small part to Berry's absence, and the band almost disbanded as a result. Stipe has said of the album's mixing process: "when we were mixing Up, we decided that it was all over. That record broke up the group." After mixing for Up had completed, manager Bertis Downs organized a week-long meeting in Idaho in an effort to keep the band intact. Described as a "self-administered group therapy session" in Reveal: The Story of R.E.M. by Johnny Black, the band recognized the changes and struggles caused by Berry's absence and their reaction to his departure, while also deciding they wanted to continue as a band. Stipe has stated that at the time, he had, "for the first time, [been] forced to imagine life without R.E.M. and it was terrifying. As we talked, I think each of us realized just how much the band meant to us."

Upon release, Up divided critics, attracting both praise and criticism for its change in sound and experimental material. At the time of its release, the band's popularity had been shifting; Up sold faster and in comparatively better numbers in many European nations compared to the US. The band originally intended not to tour in promotion of the album, instead focusing on promoting through television performances. These included appearances on Later... with Jools Holland, VH1 Storytellers, and Sesame Street, while the band also performed a live set for the sitcom Party of Five. However, they changed their minds and in February 1999 announced 45-show-long-tour of Europe and America. In April and May 1999, R.E.M. composed the soundtrack for Man on the Moon, which included the single "The Great Beyond", which would become their biggest UK hit, peaking at number three. Ken Stringfellow and Joey Waronker joined as permanent touring members at the time of the Up tour, alongside Scott McCaughey who had performed live with the band since the Monster tour. Touring commenced from June through September 1999, which included a performance at the Glastonbury Festival. The band found the tour to be much less stressful than their previous trek supporting Monster (1994), while Stipe later credited the performances with "affirm[ing] our [the band's] confidence in wanting to work with each other and wanting to keep on doing this."

== Writing and recording ==
In February 2000, R.E.M. began rehearsals at West Clayton Street in Athens in preparation for a new album, with further rehearsals occurring in March at Royaltone Studios in Hollywood. The band began recording the basic tracks for the record in May, choosing Vancouver for the location due to its proximity to Seattle, where both guitarist Peter Buck and McCaughey lived. Additionally, for the recording process, Stipe wanted to work outside the United States, both because he felt the album would be "more at home away from home" and to avoid writer's block, which had previously plagued him during the writing of Up. While in Vancouver, the band laid down tracks for more than 20 songs, with some being described by the band as "embryonic" and others being "fully-realized." At this point in recording, Stipe described the album as "kind of pick[ing] up where Up left off" and stating "some of it is pretty strange."

In June, Buck left for Seattle, leaving Stipe to complete lyrics. While writing, Stipe would travel to prevent writer's block from reoccurring, which he has credited with helping him complete "All the Way to Reno" and "Disappear". The band reformed in July at West Clayton Street to continue work. The bulk of the album was recorded between August and October at Dalkey Lodge in Ireland with Pat McCarthy returning as producer. String parts, arranged by Johnny Tate, were recorded on October 3–4, 2000 at Windmill Lane Studios in Dublin, while the final recording sessions were done at John Keane Studios in Athens. Mixing was then done on October 31 at The Hit Factory in Miami.

Mills stated that while recording Reveal, the band made an effort to use synthesizers to create sounds that possibly "hadn't been heard before" and were not presets built into the synthesizers. While Stipe's intention during the sessions was "to be really melodic", Stringfellow would be asked to create a more dissonant, experimental counterpoint. The members of R.E.M. were particularly enthusiastic about Stringfellow's contributions: "The more off into my own personal vision of the deep end, the more they liked it," Stringfellow stated in Perfect Circle: The Story of R.E.M. by Tony Fletcher. "All sorts of messed up crazy distorted things run through pedals, they were loving that." Waronker noted that Buck's demos would frequently already feature fully-fledged drum parts programmed with drum machines, causing him to focus on "what not to play" or how to add to these programmed parts which stood on their own. After tracks were recorded, Buck would frequently bring tapes to his Seattle home and record overdubs by night.

Waronker noted that as opposed to Up, in which material tended to be pieced-together, Stipe created lyrics and melodies as the material for Reveal was being developed. The first track to be recorded for the album was "She Just Wants to Be" during the May 2000 sessions in Vancouver. "Imitation of Life" was developed from a 1999 demo variously referred to as "Fake Trumpet Chorus" or simply "Trumpet Chorus." The "fake trumpets" originally featured on the track were later replaced by a string section, which is heard on the final version. While working on the song, the band moved through a variety of tempos and instrumental palettes before settling on the acoustic guitar-centric arrangement of the final version. "Saturn Return" was written by Buck on piano. Parts of the recording were taken from a demo dating back to February 2000, which was combined with effects which were looped and played backwards. The band recorded "The Lifting" as a live take with Mills, McCaughey, Stringfellow, and Jamie Candiloro all on keyboards. The final version of "I've Been High" includes synth parts which were originally intended for "Imitation of Life"; these were replaced on the latter song by a keyboard solo by Stringfellow. "Chorus and the Ring" was recorded in a single take and developed from an improptu jam. Mills had not yet heard the song at the time of recording, and so Buck led him through the chords as it was being recorded and his bassline was improvised. "Disappear" evolved from a demo entitled "Underwater Acoustic", while other working titles included "32-Chord Song" (later "Summer Turns to High") and "Jimmy Webb on Mars" (later "All the Way to Reno").

During the recording sessions, the band recorded a track entitled "Fascinating", which was removed from the record at the last moment. While Mills described the track as "very beautiful", the band felt its inclusion made the album "too long" as well as "too slow in the middle." Buck also felt the song would have "worked perfectly" on the record, but the band made a conscious choice to not release another album with a length of 64–65 minutes, leading to the song's exclusion. "Fascinating" was later covered by the duo Fischerspooner in 2009, while the R.E.M. version was finally released in 2019. Another song, "Free Form Jazz Jam," also appeared on early potential track lists but did not make the final album.

Once recording was complete, Stipe compared the process favorably to that of Up, calling it "remarkably happy" and stating the band had "become acclimated to new conditions and potentials." McCaughey echoed this, speaking fondly of the experience recording in Vancouver for its relaxed environment and the atmosphere in the studio. McCaughey noted that since Stipe already had some of the lyrics while songs were being recorded, the band would track with his vocals, which he credited with causing the Reveal sessions to feel more like a "real band" working in the studio as opposed to those for the previous album.

== Composition ==
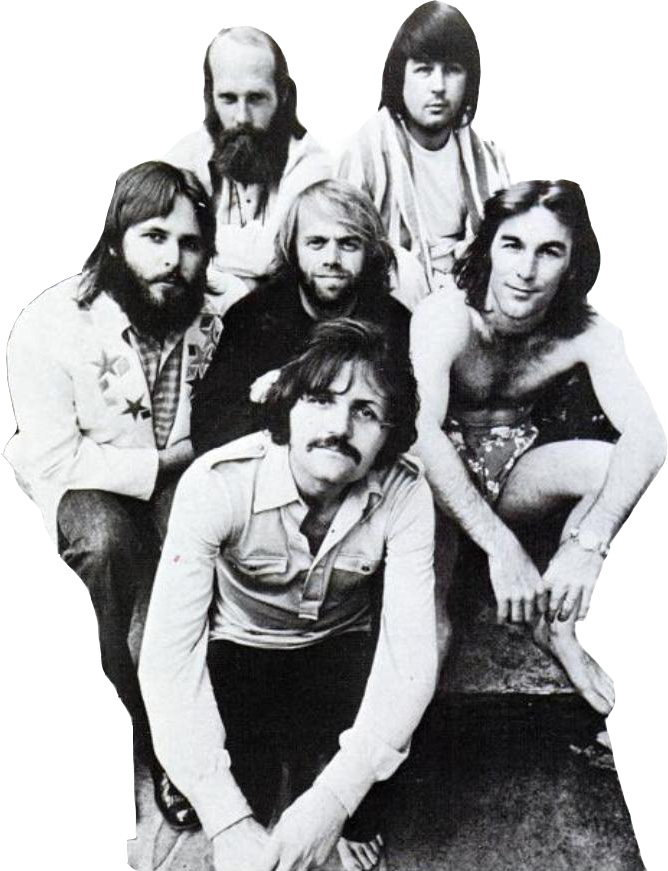
Many publications have noted the influence of the Beach Boys on certain tracks on Reveal.

Reveal features a meld of electronic and live instrumentation, with the material being more melodic and accessible than on Up. The album has generally been regarded as a more optimistic and upbeat album compared to its predecessor. AllMusic's Stephen Thomas Erlewine has compared the album to U2's successful 2000 release All That You Can't Leave Behind, calling it a "conscious return to [R.E.M.'s] classic sound". Fletcher describes the album as consisting mainly of "mid-paced songs that could easily pass as ballads, full of ethereal sound effects", while Ryan Leas of Stereogum sums it up as an album of "sad beach songs" which "play with electronic and synth textures... all glowing, sunburt, flickering." Buck has described the sound of Reveal as "warm and layered and analogue" while also having "a distance and breath to it that's modern and complete and liberating... like a beautiful vacuum." Stipe intended for Reveal to be a "summer record", which Fletcher notes is displayed in song titles such as "I'll Take the Rain", "Beachball", and "Summer Turns to High". Additionally, Stipe utilizes a more relaxed singing style throughout, while Stringfellow has noted a lyrical theme of "personal transformation", as well as "rising, not just from adversity, but your own boundaries and limitations, the little pitfalls and weaknesses that hold you back."

Many publications noted multiple tracks on the album being influenced by the Beach Boys, particularly "Beat a Drum," "Summer Turns to High" and "Beachball." Leas considers Reveal to be a "deeply Californian" work including elements of psychedelia, while its "big Stipe melodies" are intertwined with a "gorgeous, lush, aqueous sound unlike anything they [the band] did before or since." Stipe worked to make a cohesive record, avoiding songs which "stood out or made you want to change the record." Mills said that some of [Reveal's] songs are actually very sparse, but have some beautiful sounds within the sparseness."

=== Chorus side ===
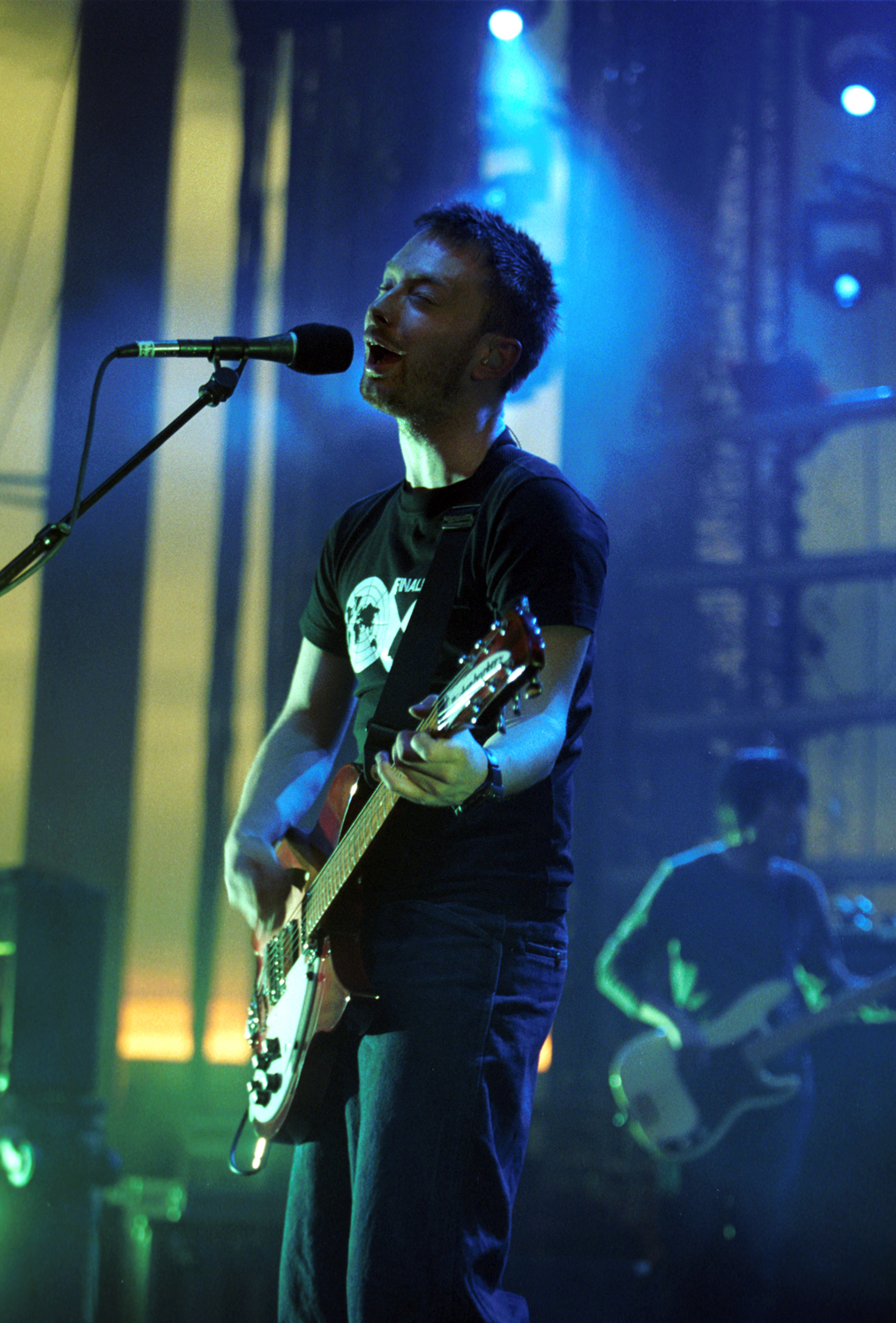
Michael Stipe initially worried that "Disappear" plagiarized Radiohead's "How to Disappear Completely", leading him to contact frontman Thom Yorke (pictured in 2001).

The album's opener "The Lifting" was written as a prequel to "Daysleeper," and features the same character. David Buckley, author of R.E.M Fiction: An Alternative Biography, states that the song references psychic and spiritual healing programs while relating to themes of self-improvement and self-help. The song includes a guitar solo in which Buck uses an e-bow, while Buckley compares its "mantric" drum figure to that of The Beatles' "Tomorrow Never Knows". The final version of "The Lifting" is a "funkier" arrangement devised by the band after its earlier arrangement was deemed too similar to "All the Way to Reno." Johnny Black lists "I've Been High" among the album's "gorgeously atmospheric ballads" while Buckley considers it to be "solemn, stately and emotional," with "subtle dance textures and beats" beneath Stipe's vocal. Stringfellow considered the song to be the "masterwork" of the record, as he felt it "push[ed] the boundary of what defines [R.E.M.] musically." For "All the Way to Reno (You're Gonna Be a Star)," Stipe wrote lyrics from the point of view of, according to Buckley, "an aspirant female on the road to fame." Buck has noted an "ironic" element to the lyrics. Black considers the song one of R.E.M.'s "most lush and blatantly commercial pieces of work," while Buckley noted its "echoes of old-style R.E.M. rootsiness." Buck cited the song as an example of a track whose creation was spurred by his purchase of a new instrument, in this case a glockenspiel. In the liner notes to the band's compilation album In Time: The Best of R.E.M. 1988–2003, Buck stated the song was intended as a "sick tribute" to songwriter Jimmy Webb, citing the use of six-string bass guitar and the song's "semi-rococo chord changes" as examples of Webb's influence. Mills has named the song's bassline as one of his favorites and has stated it consists of the first lines he played once he heard Buck's guitar parts.

"She Just Wants to Be" starts with "organic" instrumentation such as acoustic guitar, and ends with "computer-driven synth strings" intertwined with traditional orchestration. In R.E.M Fiction, Mills praises Tate's arrangements on the song, as he felt the mix of real and synthesized strings helped to alleviate their "saccharine nature." Of the subject matter, Buck has simply stated the song was written about "a person – someone I think we've met." "Disappear" begins with an acoustic intro similar to the band's earlier song "Swan Swan H" (1986), while its verses contain a "Nick Cave-style tension". The song was inspired by Stipe's trip to Israel, while Buck has called it a song about "self-effacement." During the trip, Stipe attended a rave in Tel Aviv, in which a fan asked what he was doing there; his response was "I came to disappear." Radiohead's then-recent album Kid A (2000), contained a song entitled "How to Disappear Completely", which made Stipe nervous about having possibly taken the idea. After calling Thom Yorke, lead vocalist of Radiohead and friend of Stipe's, to explain, Yorke assured Stipe that "Disappear" was his own song and that lines from "How to Disappear Completely" were inspired by Stipe: "I stole some lines from something you told me, so if you take anything from me, it's OK." Buckley considers "Saturn Return" to be the "oddest" track on Reveal, as well as "the creepiest track R.E.M. ever cut." During the demo session which spawned the song, Buck encouraged the other musicians to find "the weirdest sound on [their] instrument that [they could] possibly imagine." Stringfellow contributed a guitar part which he compared to Sonic Youth and also considered a homage to Buck's own "primitivist" style. Austin Saalman of Under the Radar calls the song a "bleak piano ballad", while Lindsay Zoladz of The New York Times has described the lyrical content as a "character study of a late-shift convenience store employee, who climbs to the building’s roof and has an awakening while staring at the night sky."

=== Ring side ===
"Beat a Drum" is one of multiple songs from Reveal to earn comparisons to the Beach Boys. Buckley considers the track to be the only other likely single choice on the album after from "Imitation of Life" (though the former did not receive a single release), crediting its "beautiful" melody by Mills. Annie Jo Baker of PopMatters compares the guitar work on the verses to the Kinks, while Saalman has declared the track to be "the band's warmest song to date." Buckley considers the lines "Beat a drum for me, like a butterfly wing / Tropical storm across the ocean" to be a reference to chaos theory and the butterfly effect. Mills used the track as an example of the benefits of using a producer; McCarthy instructed Mills to write a bridge for the song, but upon hearing the bridge, encouraged Mills to switch the positions of it and the chorus.

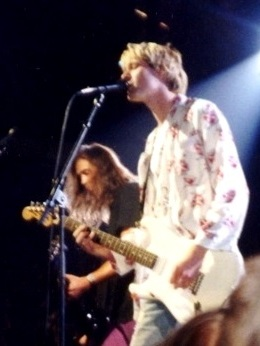
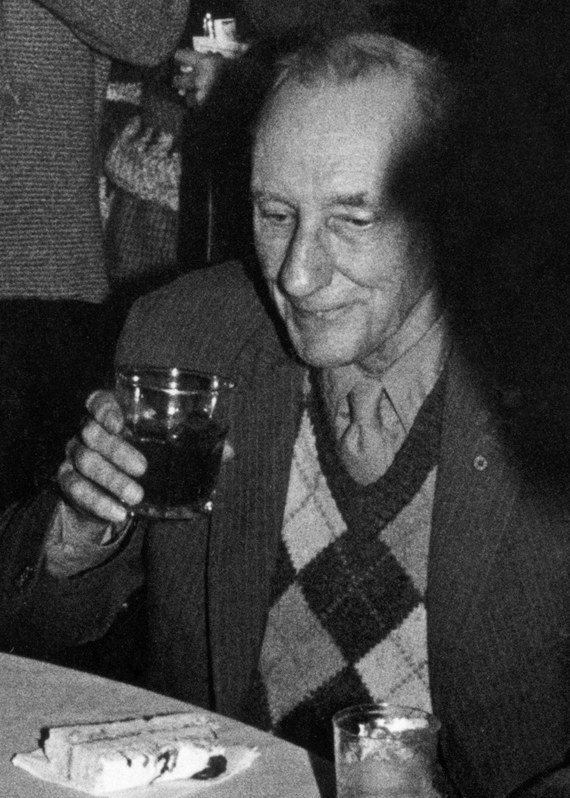
"Chorus and the Ring" was written as a tribute to musician Kurt Cobain (left, performing with Nirvana) and writer William S. Burroughs.

"Imitation of Life" takes its title from the 1959 Douglas Sirk film of the same name, as the band found it to be a "perfect metaphor for adolescence." Buckley feels the song "would not have been out of place on [the band's 1991 release] Out of Time" and "may be the most recognizably R.E.M.-sounding track on the album." He also compares its "aggressive wall of acoustic guitar" to George Harrison's "My Sweet Lord" (1970) and R.E.M.'s own "Talk About the Passion" (1984). Buck has noted that the chord progression in the verses shares similarities with the band's earlier song "Driver 8" (1985). Mills has stated the song was almost removed from Reveal for being "too R.E.M." but the band was discouraged from removing it. Its lyrics contain a "cameo of teenage discomfort, that state of being desperate to impress, yet self-conscious and clumsy."

"Summer Turns to High" is another Beach Boys-influenced track. After hearing the original version of the song, which had an "Irish feel" utilizing acoustic guitars and accordions, Stipe liked it but found it to be too busy, and so it was re-arranged to consist of just drums, bass, and a single keyboard with Stipe's vocal melody, which "pushed it completely out to left field." According to Baker, the song "combines '60s and '80s sounds and recondenses them as turn-of-the-millennium indie." "Chorus and the Ring" was written as a tribute to Kurt Cobain and William S. Burroughs. John Everhart of Under the Radar notes the contrast between the dark lyrics and the song's "Celtic folk stomp."

Baker states that "I'll Take the Rain" "pairs self-empowering but melancholic lyrics with optimistic instrumentation and vocals." Stipe says this song is the "odd one out" on the album, being the only "winter song" on an otherwise summer-themed record. His intention was to "write a lyric that matched the tone of the music", while also creating a song which "balance[d] all [the] sunniness" of the rest of Reveal. "Beachball", the closing track, contains live strings in the verses and synth strings in chorus. Saalman notes its "jingling bells, the weeping strings, [and] chorus of horns" and compares the track to the Beach Boys' "Caroline, No" and "I'm Waiting for the Day" Its original lyric was about drug dealing on the streets of Vancouver, but it was changed to be, according to Buck, about "people having fun at the beach."

== Release ==
We were very happy to be making this record. We had gotten through a bunch of crap in the last few years and we had no ongoing crises at the time. And I think that's what shows up [on the album] and makes it kind of summery and fun.

— Mike Mills

At the time of its release, the members of R.E.M. emphasized the happier atmosphere when writing and recording Reveal in contrast with their previous few releases. Stipe declared the album to be his favorite at this time; he has continued to name it and New Adventures in Hi-Fi among his favorite R.E.M. albums. Mills declared that it was "more focused than the last album" because they "didn't have an ongoing crisis to contend with as we made it. We were free to concentrate on having fun." The title of the album was suggested by Bertis Downs and comes from the lyric "have I missed the big reveal?" in "I've Been High".

=== Commercial performance ===
"Imitation of Life" was delivered to radio stations in March 2001, and was commercially released as the album's first single in April. The song reached number six in the UK, becoming their second consecutive top 10 hit there. However, the single stalled at number 83 on the Billboard Hot 100 and sold only 15,000 copies in the US. It fared better on the Adult Alternative Songs chart, where it had a three-week stay at the top. The song was supported by a Garth Jennings-directed video consisting of a 20-second loop of film capturing an elaborate pool party, played forwards and backwards and zoomed in and out; it was filmed over two weeks in February 2001 and included a cast of 76 people. "All the Way to Reno" was chosen as the album's second single and released on July 23. The song was moderately successful, peaking at number 24 in the UK and number 8 on the Billboard Adult Alternative Songs chart. Its video, directed by Michael Moore was filmed at Bishop Ford High School in Brooklyn, New York, with a camera crew consisting of students. The album's third single, "I'll Take the Rain", was released on November 19. It missed the top 40 in the UK, peaking at number 44.

The album itself was released on May 14, 2001, in the UK and the following day in the US. It entered the UK charts at number one, selling 33,000 copies in the first day of release and 110,000 in its first week. The album also debuted at number one in Italy (where it sold 130,000 copies in its first week, already reaching Platinum status), Austria, Ireland, Norway, and Switzerland, while it also rose to the top in Germany. In Brazil and Belgium, the album peaked at number two, while it reached the top 10 in Japan, Australia, France, Thailand, and Canada. By the end of the month, sales of Reveal had exceeded a million copies in Europe; in many countries its sales surpassed those of Up before the release of a second single. In the US, the album reached number six, the band's lowest peak since the introduction of Nielsen SoundScan in 1991. The album was certified Gold by the RIAA on June 20, 2001, for sales in excess of 500,000 copies in the US. Worldwide sales have since exceeded four million copies.

=== Promotion ===
Inspired by their experience performing at the open-air South African Freedom Day concert in Trafalgar Square, London on April 27, R.E.M. considered performing free shows within city squares to promote Reveal in lieu of a traditional tour. However, city authorities were unenthusiastic about the idea, and so the band performed only two further concerts in this vein, one in Cologne and one in Toronto. In the US, a promotional CD entitled Not Bad for No Tour was released, displaying international chart positions and sales figures in its packaging. In June, the band traveled to Los Angeles to record voiceovers for The Simpsons, while later in August, they appeared on Top of the Pops performing "All the Way to Reno". American promotion for Reveal was mainly limited to television performances, including appearances on The Late Show with David Letterman and MTV Unplugged. Additionally, the band played one show each at the Museum of Television and Radio in New York and Los Angeles.

== Critical reception ==
Professional ratings
Aggregate scores
Source	Rating
Metacritic	76/100
Review scores
Source	Rating
AllMusic	3/5 stars
Entertainment Weekly	B
The Guardian	3/5 stars
Los Angeles Times	3.5/4 stars
NME	7/10
Pitchfork	5.0/10
Q	5/5 stars
Rolling Stone	4/5 stars
Spin	7/10
The Village Voice	B−

Upon release, Reveal was received positively by critics. On Metacritic, which assigns a normalized rating out of 100 to reviews from critics, Reveal has received an average score of 76, indicating "generally positive reviews." Multiple reviewers have compared the album to All That You Can't Leave Behind (2000) by U2, noting it as a "return to form" and a "conscious return to their classic sound." Bono himself has praised the album: "Reveal is extraordinary. I know it's extraordinary because I felt ill when I heard it. It's a very beautiful, awe-inspiring record." The album also earned comparisons to the band's own Automatic for the People (1992), and was praised for showing the band begin to fully recover from Berry's departure.

Adam Sweeting of The Guardian feels that with the album, the band "settles into a convincing identity as a trio." He laments what he feels to be a lack of new territory for the band, with the exception of "Saturn Return", which "gently evoke[s] the spirit of Brian Eno." However, he also notes the band could "knock together a heartrending anthem out of next to nothing"; Sweeting uses "I've Been High" as an example, calling it "possibly [the album's] finest moment" and praising its simplicity. In a review for The A.V. Club, Keith Phipps states that 21 years into their career, R.E.M. still "continue to surprise." He cites many of the album's electronic experiments as continuations of Up, while its songs rely "less on single moods" in comparison to that album.

Will Hermes of Entertainment Weekly is among those who consider the album a "return to form". He names "Imitation of Life" and "I'll Take the Rain" as highlights. However, he also notes Mills' lowered presence on backing vocals, as well as opining that the album is "haunted by an ennui that's curious for a band that made their name by talking about the passion." Dave Heaton of PopMatters summed up Reveal as "a lush, dreamy pop mood-piece that hovers in the realm of rumination and introspection." Heaton argues that the album has more in common with the band's earlier Fables of the Reconstruction (1985) rather than Up, due to a focus on "melancholy, midtempo pop" and a return to more enigmatic and "artsy" themes. NME's April Long summed up the album as "R.E.M. remembering who they are, and reaffirming why they do what they do." Long praises its simplicity, saying it prioritizes "minutiae and subtlety" in lieu of "grand gestures." She also states that while she found it to initially be an "underwhelming" listen, it eventually becomes "gracefully rewarding."

Some reviews were more mixed. Matt LeMay of Pitchfork gave the album a rating of 5.0 out of 10, stating he found the album's electronic elements to be "superficial" and felt they created an overly busy sound. He also found many of its songs to be repetitive, without stronger melodies or more variation to improve the tracks. LeMay does state that despite some "terrible lyrics", "Imitation of Life" possesses "a catchy hook, and a sufficient degree of sonic variety", while "The Lifting" contains "an undeniably great melody." Robert Christgau scored the album at a B− and named it his "dud of the month", feeling it was "not as bad as it first sounds, but also not as good as they thought when they released it, or they wouldn't have, I hope."

Retrospectively, the album has continued to receive positive reviews. In an article commemorating the 20th anniversary of the album's release, Ryan Leas of Stereogum declares Reveal as possibly "the most underrated album in [R.E.M.'s] hallowed catalogue." He notes that in comparison to the anxiety expressed on Up, Reveal is "warm" and "vibrant", while also harboring a "wistfulness and melancholia." In Annie Jo Baker's PopMatters retrospective, she highlights the album's ability to maintain a consistent sound without lacking "classic R.E.M. eccentricity." She also notes the mix of optimism and sadness throughout the record, stating it "invok[es] the kind of melancholic cheer shown by a parent watching their child grow up."

=== Band opinions ===
The members of R.E.M. have spoken highly of Reveal since its release. At the time, Stipe felt the album had "proven to ourselves that as a trio we can be a successful creative unit." He continues to rank Reveal, alongside New Adventures in Hi-Fi (1996), among his favorite R.E.M. albums. Some time after release, Buck stated he found Reveal to be "equal to Automatic [for the People]". In a 2023 interview with Vulture, Mills selected it as the R.E.M. album most deserving of a reapprasial, calling it a "hidden gem" and describing it as "not a rock record per se, but it's a beautiful-music record."

== Track listing ==
All songs written by Peter Buck, Mike Mills and Michael Stipe.

Chorus side

1. "The Lifting" – 4:39
2. "I've Been High" – 3:25
3. "All the Way to Reno (You're Gonna Be a Star)" – 4:43
4. "She Just Wants to Be" – 5:22
5. "Disappear" – 4:11
6. "Saturn Return" – 4:55

Ring side

7. "Beat a Drum" – 4:21
8. "Imitation of Life" – 3:57
9. "Summer Turns to High" – 3:31
10. "Chorus and the Ring" – 4:31
11. "I'll Take the Rain" – 5:51
12. "Beachball" – 4:14

== Personnel ==
Personnel taken from liner notes.

=== R.E.M. ===
- Peter Buck
- Mike Mills
- Michael Stipe

=== Additional musicians ===
- Scott McCaughey
- Ken Stringfellow
- Joey Waronker
- Jamie Candiloro
- John Keane
- Glen Brady
- String arrangements – Johnny Tate, R.E.M.
- Strings – Michael Healy, Pamela Forde, Sunniva Fitzpatrick, Eileen Murphy, Ruth Murphy, Sebastian Petiet, Elizabeth Leonard, Paul O'Hanlon, Jennifer Cassidy, Carol Quigley, Debbie Ellis, Nicola Cleary, Ruth Mann, Michelle Lalor, Elizabeth Dean, Cliona O'Driscoll, Marcus Miller, Peter Crooks, David James, Hillary O'Donovan, Annette Cleary
- Horns – David Martin, Shaun Hooke, Eoin Daly, Fergal O' Ceallachain, David Carmody
- Woodwind – David Agnew
- Horns on "Beachball" – Get the Horn Section

=== Technical ===
- Production – Pat McCarthy, R.E.M.
- Recording and mixing – Pat McCarthy, Jamie Candiloro, John Keane (at John Keane Studios)
- Assistant/2nd engineers – Dean Maher, Zach Blackstone, Alex Aligizakis (at The Warehouse), Mark Fitzgerald, Marguerite Ryan, Mary Boylan, Bee Mangan (at Dalkey Lodge), Kieran Lynch, Dave Hughes (at Windmill Lane), Christine Tramontano (at The Hit Factory)
- Mastering – Bob Ludwig (at Gateway Mastering)
- Editing – Adam Ayan

== Charts and certifications ==
=== Weekly charts ===
Weekly chart performance for Reveal
Chart (2001)	Peak position
Australian Albums (ARIA)	5
Austrian Albums (Ö3 Austria)	1
Belgian Albums (Ultratop Flanders)	2
Belgian Albums (Ultratop Wallonia)	5
Canadian Albums (Billboard)	4
Danish Albums (Hitlisten)	2
Dutch Albums (Album Top 100)	7
European Albums (Music & Media)	1
Finnish Albums (Suomen virallinen lista)	3
French Albums (SNEP)	4
German Albums (Offizielle Top 100)	1
Hungarian Albums (MAHASZ)	13
Irish Albums (IRMA)	1
Italian Albums (FIMI)	1
New Zealand Albums (RMNZ)	10
Norwegian Albums (VG-lista)	1
Spanish Albums (PROMUSICAE)	3
Swedish Albums (Sverigetopplistan)	2
Swiss Albums (Schweizer Hitparade)	1
UK Albums (Official Charts)	1
US Billboard 200	6

=== Year-end charts ===
Year-end chart performance for Reveal by R.E.M.
Chart (2001)	Position
Australian Albums (ARIA)	67
Austrian Albums (Ö3 Austria)	27
Belgian Albums (Ultratop Flanders)	58
Belgian Albums (Wallonia)	83
Canadian Albums (Nielsen SoundScan)	144
Dutch Albums (Album Top 100)	99
European Albums (Music & Media)	20
French Albums (SNEP)	130
German Albums (Offizielle Top 100)	16
Italian Albums (FIMI)	14
Swedish Albums (Sverigetopplistan)	81
Swiss Albums (Schweizer Hitparade)	22
UK Albums (OCC)	47
Worldwide Albums (IFPI)	41

=== Certifications ===
Certifications for Reveal
Region	Certification	Certified units/sales
Australia (ARIA)	Gold	35,000^{^}
Austria (IFPI Austria)	Gold	20,000^{*}
Belgium (BRMA)	Gold	25,000^{*}
Canada (Music Canada)	Gold	50,000^{^}
Denmark (IFPI Danmark)	Gold	25,000^{^}
Germany (BVMI)	Gold	150,000^{^}
Italy (FIMI)	Platinum	130,000
New Zealand (RMNZ)	Gold	7,500^{^}
Spain (Promusicae)	Gold	50,000^{^}
Switzerland (IFPI Switzerland)	Platinum	40,000^{^}
United Kingdom (BPI)	Platinum	300,000^{^}
United States (RIAA)	Gold	415,000
Summaries
Europe (IFPI)	Platinum	1,000,000^{*}
^{*} Sales figures based on certification alone.^{^} Shipments figures based on certification alone.
