= Man on the Moon (soundtrack) =

Soundtrack album by R.E.M.
- Released: November 23, 1999
- Recorded: May 1999
- Genres: Alternative rock, film score
- Length: 36:59
- Label: Warner Bros. Records/Jersey Records
- Producers: Pat McCarthy and R.E.M.

R.E.M. chronology
| Up (1998) | Man on the Moon (1999) | Reveal (2001) |

Singles from Man on the Moon
- 1. "Mighty Mouse Theme" Released: 1999; 2. "The Great Beyond" Released: November 16, 1999

Man on the Moon (Music from the Motion Picture) is the soundtrack to the 1999 film Man on the Moon. The soundtrack was released on November 22, 1999, in the UK and November 23, 1999, in the US. It was issued on Warner Bros. Records, in conjunction with Jersey Records, a part of Danny DeVito's Jersey Group.

The soundtrack was written by rock band R.E.M., whose 1992 song "Man on the Moon" (originally written in honor of Kaufman) gave the film its title. The soundtrack also included the Grammy-nominated song "The Great Beyond", which remains the band's highest-charting single in the United Kingdom.

== Track listing ==
1. "Mighty Mouse Theme (Here I Come to Save the Day)", (Philip, Scheib, Marshall Barer) performed by The Sandpipers – 1:53
2. "The Great Beyond" (Peter Buck, Mike Mills, Michael Stipe), performed by R.E.M. – 5:05
3. "Kiss You All Over" (Mike Chapman, Nicky Chinn), performed by Exile – 3:37
4. "Angela" (Theme to Taxi) (Bob James), performed by Bob James – 1:27
5. "Tony Thrown Out" (Buck, Mills, Stipe), performed by orchestra – 1:08
6. "Man on the Moon" (Bill Berry, Buck, Mills, Stipe), performed by R.E.M. – 5:13
7. "This Friendly World" (Ken Darby), performed by Michael Stipe and Jim Carrey (with the latter portraying both Tony Clifton and Andy Kaufman) – 3:02
8. "Miracle" (Buck, Mills, Stipe), performed by Mike Mills and an orchestra – 2:53
9. "Lynne & Andy" (Buck, Mills, Stipe), performed by an orchestra – 1:46
10. "Rose Marie" (Herbert Stothart, Oscar Hammerstein II, Otto Harbach, Rudolf Friml), performed by Andy Kaufman – 2:36
11. "Andy Gets Fired" (Buck, Mills, Stipe), performed by an orchestra – 1:07
12. "I Will Survive" (Freddie Perren, Dino Fekaris), performed by Tony Clifton – 1:49
13. "Milk & Cookies" (Buck, Mills, Stipe), performed by an orchestra – 1:59
14. "Man on the Moon" (Berry, Buck, Mills, Stipe), performed by an orchestra – 1:50
15. "One More Song for You" (Michael Omartian, Stormie Omartian), performed by Andy Kaufman – 1:16

== Personnel ==
- Chris Bilheimer – packaging design
- Anita Camarata – music supervisor
- Kaylin Frank – associate music supervisor
- Ted Jensen – mastering
- Pat McCarthy – production
