= Man on the Moon (R.E.M. song) =

1992 single by R.E.M.

Single by R.E.M.

from the album Automatic for the People
- B-side: "New Orleans Instrumental No. 2"
- Released: November 9, 1992
- Genre: Alternative rock; country rock
- Length: 5:14; 4:39 (edit)
- Label: Warner Bros.
- Songwriters: Bill Berry; Peter Buck; Mike Mills; Michael Stipe
- Producers: Scott Litt; R.E.M.

R.E.M. singles chronology
"Drive" (1992)	"Man on the Moon" (1992)	"The Sidewinder Sleeps Tonite" (1993)

Music video
- "Man on the Moon" on YouTube

"Man on the Moon" is a song by the American alternative rock band R.E.M., released in November 1992 by Warner Bros. as the second single from their eighth album, Automatic for the People (1992). The lyrics were written by lead singer Michael Stipe, and the music by drummer Bill Berry and guitarist Peter Buck. The song was well received by critics and reached number 30 on the US Billboard Hot 100, number 17 on the US Cash Box Top 100, number 18 on the UK Singles Chart, and number one in Iceland. The accompanying music video, filmed in black-and-white, was directed by Peter Care and shot in California. It remains one of R.E.M.'s most popular songs and was included on the compilations In Time: The Best of R.E.M. 1988–2003 and Part Lies, Part Heart, Part Truth, Part Garbage 1982–2011.

"Man on the Moon" is a tribute to comedian Andy Kaufman, with numerous references to his career including his Elvis impersonation, wrestling, and the film My Breakfast with Blassie. The song's title and chorus refer to Moon landing conspiracy theories, as an oblique allusion to rumors that the moon landing was faked. The song gave its name to Miloš Forman's Kaufman biopic Man on the Moon (1999), and features prominently in the film's soundtrack.

== Composition ==
"Man on the Moon" is a mid-tempo country-rock song following a verse-chorus structure with an added pre-chorus and an instrumental bridge following the second and third choruses. The song has six lines in the first verse but only four in the second and third verses.

An early instrumental demo of the song was known to the band as "C to D Slide". Guitarist Peter Buck has explained how the music came together: "'Man on the Moon' was something that Bill [Berry] had, this one chord change that he came in with, which was C to D like the verse of the song, and he said: 'I don't know what to do with that.' I used to finish some of Bill's things ... he would come up with the riffs, but I would be the finish guy for that. I sat down and came up with the chorus, the bridges, and so forth. I remember we showed it to Mike [Mills] and Michael [Stipe] when they came in later; definitely we had the song finished. I think Bill played bass and I played guitar; we kept going around with it. I think we might have played some mandolin on it in the rehearsal studio."

Michael Stipe explained in an interview with Charlie Rose how the lyric was written independently of the music, which had no prior association with the song's eventual lyrical content regarding Kaufman. Stipe recounted the other R.E.M. members had written and performed the music of the song and recorded it along with the rest of the Automatic for the People album during studio sessions in Seattle. As of the final week of the recording sessions, Stipe was still struggling to write the lyric, and the others continued to plead with him to finish it. Stipe attempted to argue the track should be an instrumental, but his bandmates were insistent. Stipe listened to the track on a walk around Seattle on his Walkman cassette player and was inspired to write about Andy Kaufman. After Stipe went back to the studio to complete the vocal track, the track was mixed that night and sent out the following day to be mastered.

== Lyrics ==
The song's lyrics do not tell a conventional story and instead form a collection of cultural references, images and ideas. There are repeated mentions of Andy Kaufman, including references to his Elvis impersonation and work with wrestlers Fred Blassie and Jerry Lawler. The song also invokes the conspiracy theories surrounding the Moon landing and Elvis Presley's death as an indirect nod to the persistent rumors that Kaufman faked his own death. Speaking in 2017 to the NME, Mike Mills explained that the perceived ambiguity of Kaufman's legacy, including questions of whether he was a comedian or a performance artist, and whether his work was funny or irritating, was a way to frame other questions about life within the song:

He's the perfect ghost to lead you through this tour of questioning things. Did the moon landing really happen? Is Elvis really dead? He was kind of an ephemeral figure at that point so he was the perfect guy to tie all this stuff together as you journey through childhood and touchstones of life.

Regarding the cryptic lyrics, critic Greg Kot wrote that the song "presents a surreal vision of heaven." According to Ann Powers, "Mentioning Kaufman in the same breath as Moses and Sir Isaac Newton, Stipe makes a game of human endeavor, insisting that it all ends in dust. 'Let's play Twister, let's play Risk,' Stipe jokes to the notables he's invoked. 'I'll see you in heaven if you make the list.'"

The lyrics to "Man on the Moon" also feature a prominent refrain of "Yeah, yeah, yeah, yeah". Stipe explained that the repetition of "yeah" was intended to playfully upstage Kurt Cobain's heavy use of the word.

== Release and reception ==
"Man on the Moon" was released as the second single from Automatic for the People on November 9, 1992, reaching number 30 on the Billboard Hot 100 and number 18 on the UK Singles Chart.

The song was enthusiastically received by critics. Writing for the New York Times, Ann Powers said it "shines with a wit that balances R.E.M.'s somber tendencies." Stewart Mason went even further in his review for AllMusic, calling the song "near-perfect", "almost inarguably Stipe's pinnacle as a singer", and "one of R.E.M.'s most enduring achievements". In his weekly UK chart commentary, James Masterton felt that it "may be typical R.E.M. but is not their most commercial ever. The wave of following they have at the moment though means they can do little wrong with this possibly following 'Drive' into the Top 10."

Edwin Pouncey from NME commented, "There are things hidden in 'Man on the Moon' that make you feel sad, lonely, nostalgic and warm. There is also the occasional surprise, as when Michael Stipe unexpectedly summons forth the ghostly presence of a young girl to sing along with a few words from his song. He makes you look over your shoulder while, at the same time, urging you on to look deeper into his strange and personal world." Parry Gettelman from Orlando Sentinel wrote, "The gently catchy "Man on the Moon" sounds a bit more like Lifes Rich Pageant-era R.E.M. although the arrangement is more acoustic. Mills' high harmonies, all too rare on this album, add resonance, and as Michael Stipe sings about Andy Kaufman, the Twister game and Elvis, he lapses into a humorous, appealing Elvis-via-Bryan-Ferry imitation. Peter Buck's slide guitar underlines the hummable chorus. The melody sounds a whole lot like a lower-key remake of "Fall on Me", but that was such a great song, who's complaining?" The song was listed at number 19 on the Village Voice "Pazz & Jop" year-end critics' poll in 1993.

== Music video ==
The song's accompanying music video, directed by English director Peter Care, was shot in black and white over three days in Lancaster, California, in October 1992. Care kept a journal of the unusually long planning, filming, and editing process, which was published by Raygun magazine and reprinted in the R.E.M. fan club newsletter.

The video depicts Stipe, attired in a cowboy hat, walking along a desert road before leaping onto a passing truck (driven by Berry) and hitching a ride to a truck stop, where Buck is tending bar and Mills is shooting pool. Berry trades his truck seat for a bar stool, and along with a few of the other customers sings along during the choruses. Stipe eats an order of French fries and then leaves and walks back into the desert. The video is punctuated with Moon-related images, including footage of the NASA Moon landings, an orrery in motion and a clip from Georges Méliès' 1902 film A Trip to the Moon. Television footage of Kaufman wrestling and impersonating Elvis Presley is also shown.

This video, which uses the edited version of the song, instead of the full album version, was ranked number 41 on Rolling Stone magazine's "The 100 Top Music Videos" and has been described as 'iconic' by the NME's Andrew Trendell.

== Track listings ==
All songs were written by Bill Berry, Peter Buck, Mike Mills and Michael Stipe except as noted.

- US 7-inch, cassette, and CD single
1. "Man on the Moon" (album version) – 5:12
2. "New Orleans Instrumental No. 2" – 3:47
- UK CD1
1. "Man on the Moon" (edit) – 4:39
2. "Turn You Inside-Out" – 4:15
3. "Arms of Love" (Robyn Hitchcock) – 3:35
- UK CD2
1. "Man on the Moon" – 5:12
2. "Fruity Organ" – 3:26
3. "New Orleans Instrumental No. 2" – 3:48
4. "Arms of Love" (Hitchcock) – 3:35
- UK 7-inch and cassette single
1. "Man on the Moon" (edit) – 4:39
2. "Turn You Inside-Out" – 4:15

== Charts ==
=== Weekly charts ===
Chart (1992–1993)	Peak; position
Australia (ARIA)	39
Austria (Ö3 Austria Top 40)	24
Belgium (Ultratop 50 Flanders)	20
Canada Retail Singles (The Record)	9
Canada Top Singles (RPM)	3
Europe (Eurochart Hot 100)	56
Germany (GfK)	34
Iceland (Íslenski Listinn Topp 40)	1
Ireland (IRMA)	17
Netherlands (Dutch Top 40 Tipparade)	4
Netherlands (Single Top 100)	54
New Zealand (Recorded Music NZ)	8
UK Singles (Official Charts)	18
UK Airplay (Music Week)	7
US Billboard Hot 100	30
US Adult Contemporary (Billboard)	46
US Alternative Airplay (Billboard)	2
US Mainstream Rock (Billboard)	4
US Pop Airplay (Billboard)	9
US Cash Box Top 100	17

=== Year-end charts ===
Chart (1993)	Position
Canada Top Singles (RPM)	29
Germany (Media Control)	95
Iceland (Íslenski Listinn Topp 40)	4
US Album Rock Tracks (Billboard)	22

== Certifications ==
Region	Certification	Certified units/sales
New Zealand (RMNZ)	Platinum	30,000^{‡}
Spain (Promusicae)	Gold	30,000^{‡}
United Kingdom (BPI)	Gold	400,000^{‡}
^{‡} Sales+streaming figures based on certification alone.

== Release history ==
Region	Date	Format(s)	Label(s)	Ref.
United Kingdom	November 9, 1992	7-inch vinyl; CD; cassette	Warner Bros.	
Japan	January 25, 1993	Mini-CD	Warner Bros.	
