= Pat McCarthy (music producer) =

Irish musician and publisher

Patrick McCarthy is a record producer from Dublin, Ireland, who has worked for several rock and alternative rock artists, including The Waterboys, Counting Crows, R.E.M., and U2.

In 1998, he replaced Scott Litt as R.E.M.'s in-house producer, co-producing three of their albums Up, Reveal and Around the Sun as well as the Man on the Moon soundtrack; McCarthy had previously served as engineer on R.E.M.'s albums Monster and New Adventures in Hi-Fi. In 2007 it was announced that R.E.M.'s fourteenth studio album, Accelerate, would be produced by Jacknife Lee rather than McCarthy. McCarthy also mixed Madonna's successful 1998 album Ray of Light. More recently, he wrote English-language lyrics for the popular YouTube Japanese song Bad Apple!!, subsequently performed by Cristina Vee.

He recorded Counting Crows' debut record August and Everything After which was produced by T-Bone Burnett and he mixed half the songs (with Scott Litt mixing the other half).
