= R.E.M. discography =

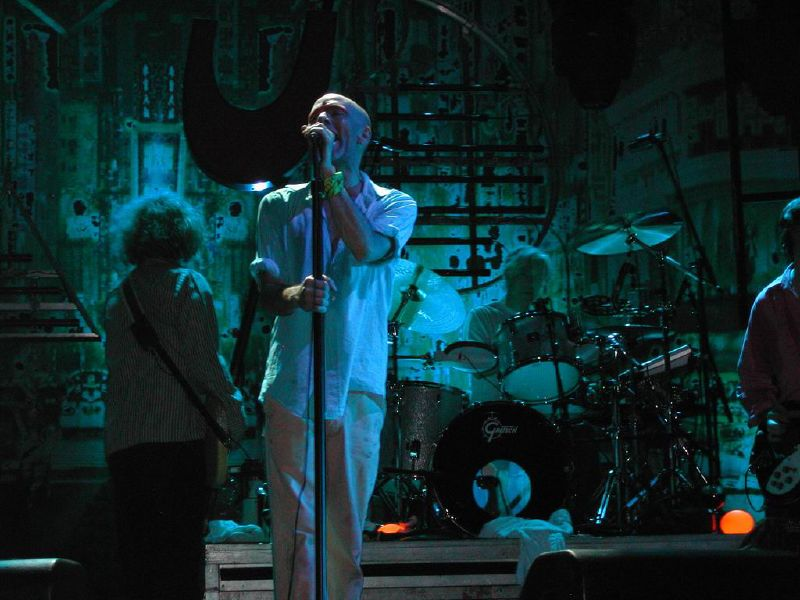
- R.E.M. performing in Padua, Italy, in July 2003
- Studio albums: 15
- Extended plays: 6
- Soundtrack albums: 1
- Live albums: 5
- Compilation albums: 16
- Singles: 63
- Video albums: 13
- Music videos: 77
- Remix albums: 1

The American alternative rock band R.E.M. has released 15 studio albums, five live albums, 14 compilation albums, one remix album, one soundtrack album, 12 video albums, seven extended plays, 63 singles, and 77 music videos. Formed in 1980 by singer Michael Stipe, guitarist Peter Buck, bassist Mike Mills, and drummer Bill Berry, the band was pivotal in the development of the alternative rock genre. Their musical style inspired many other alternative rock bands and musicians, and the band became one of the first alternative rock acts to experience breakthrough commercial success. R.E.M. have sold more than ninety million albums worldwide, making them one of the best-selling music artists of all time.

== Albums ==
=== Studio albums ===
List of R.E.M. studio albums, with selected chart positions and certifications
Title	Album details	Peak chart positions										Certifications
Title	Album details	US	AUS	AUT	CAN	GER	NLD	NOR	NZ	SWI	UK	Certifications
Murmur	Released: April 12, 1983 (US); Label: I.R.S.; Formats: CD, cassette, LP	36	—	—	—	—	—	—	47	—	100	RIAA: Gold; BPI: Gold
Reckoning	Released: April 9, 1984 (UK); Label: I.R.S.; Formats: CD, cassette, LP	27	—	—	—	—	—	—	23	—	91	RIAA: Gold; BPI: Silver
Fables of the Reconstruction	Released: June 10, 1985 (UK); Label: I.R.S.; Formats: CD, cassette, LP	28	—	—	40	—	—	—	29	—	35	RIAA: Gold; BPI: Silver
Lifes Rich Pageant	Released: July 28, 1986 (US); Label: I.R.S.; Formats: CD, cassette, LP	21	73	—	39	—	—	17	24	—	43	RIAA: Gold; BPI: Silver; MC: Platinum
Document	Released: September 1, 1987 (US); Label: I.R.S.; Formats: CD, cassette, LP, DVDA	10	47	—	13	—	47	—	17	—	28	RIAA: Platinum; BPI: Gold; MC: Platinum
Green	Released: November 8, 1988; Label: Warner Bros.; Formats: CD, cassette, LP, DVDA	12	16	—	14	—	—	—	6	—	27	RIAA: 2× Platinum; BPI: Platinum; MC: 2× Platinum
Out of Time	Released: March 12, 1991 (US); Label: Warner Bros.; Formats: CD, cassette, LP, MD, DVDA	1	4	1	1	2	1	4	3	3	1	RIAA: 4× Platinum; ARIA: 2× Platinum; BPI: 5× Platinum; BVMI: 5× Gold; IFPI AUT: Platinum; IFPI SWI: 2× Platinum; MC: 7× Platinum; NVPI: 2× Platinum
Automatic for the People	Released: October 5, 1992 (US); Label: Warner Bros.; Formats: CD, cassette, LP, MD, DVDA, BD	2	2	3	4	2	2	4	1	3	1	RIAA: 4× Platinum; ARIA: 4× Platinum; BPI: 8× Platinum; BVMI: 5× Gold; IFPI AUT: 2× Platinum; IFPI SWI: 2× Platinum; MC: 7× Platinum; NVPI: 3× Platinum
Monster	Released: September 26, 1994 (US); Label: Warner Bros.; Formats: CD, cassette, LP, DVDA	1	2	1	1	2	1	2	1	1	1	RIAA: 4× Platinum; ARIA: Platinum; BPI: 3× Platinum; BVMI: Platinum; IFPI AUT: Platinum; IFPI SWI: Platinum; MC: 6× Platinum; NVPI: Gold
New Adventures in Hi-Fi	Released: September 9, 1996 (US); Label: Warner Bros.; Formats: CD, cassette, LP, DVDA	2	1	1	1	1	1	1	1	1	1	RIAA: Platinum; ARIA: Gold; BPI: Platinum; BVMI: Gold; IFPI AUT: Gold; IFPI NOR: Gold; IFPI SWI: Gold; MC: 2× Platinum
Up	Released: October 27, 1998 (US); Label: Warner Bros.; Formats: CD, cassette, LP, MD, DVDA	3	5	1	2	1	16	1	8	7	2	RIAA: Gold; ARIA: Gold; BPI: Platinum; IFPI AUT: Gold; IFPI NOR: Platinum; IFPI SWI: Gold
Reveal	Released: May 15, 2001 (US); Label: Warner Bros.; Formats: CD, cassette, LP, DVDA	6	5	1	4	1	7	1	10	1	1	RIAA: Gold; ARIA: Gold; BPI: Platinum; BVMI: Gold; IFPI AUT: Gold; IFPI SWI: 2× Platinum; MC: Gold
Around the Sun	Released: October 5, 2004 (US); Label: Warner Bros.; Formats: CD, LP, cassette, digital download, DVDA	13	6	1	7	1	7	1	12	1	1	ARIA: Gold; BPI: Gold; BVMI: Gold; IFPI AUT: Gold; IFPI SWI: Platinum
Accelerate	Released: April 1, 2008 (US); Label: Warner Bros.; Formats: CD, LP, digital download	2	13	2	1	2	2	1	5	1	1	BPI: Gold; BVMI: Gold; IFPI AUT: Gold; IFPI NOR: Platinum; IFPI SWI: Platinum
Collapse into Now	Released: March 8, 2011 (US); Label: Warner Bros.; Formats: CD, LP, digital download	5	15	2	6	1	8	2	10	1	5	BPI: Silver

=== Live albums ===
List of R.E.M. live albums, with selected chart positions and certifications
Title	Album details	Peak chart positions										Certifications
Title	Album details	US	AUT	BEL (FL)	BEL (WA)	FRA	GER	NLD	NOR	SWI	UK	Certifications
R.E.M. Live	Released: October 15, 2007; Label: Warner Bros.; Formats: CD, LP, digital download	72	12	11	22	55	8	16	25	16	12	BVMI: Gold
Live at the Olympia	Released: October 27, 2009 (US); Label: Warner Bros.; Formats: CD, LP, digital download	95	43	40	72	157	53	59	—	80	68	
Unplugged: The Complete 1991 and 2001 Sessions	Released: April 19, 2014 (US); Label: Rhino; Formats: CD, LP, digital download	21	33	19	50	—	28	20	—	56	22	
R.E.M. at the BBC	Released: October 19, 2018; Label: Craft Recordings; Formats: 8 CDs and 1 DVD	—	60	75	78	—	23	86	—	94	40	
Bingo Hand Job: Live at the Borderline 1991	Released: April 13, 2019; Label: USM/Concord; Formats: 2× vinyl LP	—	—	—	—	—	—	—	—	—	—	

=== Compilation albums ===
List of R.E.M. compilation albums, with selected chart positions and certifications
Title	Album details	Peak chart positions										Certifications
Title	Album details	US	AUS	AUT	CAN	GER	NLD	NOR	NZ	SWI	UK	Certifications
Dead Letter Office	Released: April 27, 1987 (US); Label: I.R.S.; Formats: CD, cassette, LP	52	—	—	59	—	—	—	—	—	60	
Eponymous	Released: October 17, 1988 (US); Label: I.R.S.; Formats: CD, cassette, LP	44	29	—	—	—	—	—	16	—	69	
Singleactiongreen	Released: 1989 (US); Label: Warner Bros.; Formats: 7" box set	—	—	—	—	—	—	—	—	—	—	
The Best of R.E.M.	Released: September 30, 1991; Label: I.R.S.; Formats: CD, cassette, LP	—	20	22	—	23	67	—	40	27	7	ARIA: Gold; BPI: Gold; BVMI: Gold; IFPI AUT: Gold
The Automatic Box	Released: December 1, 1993; Label: Warner Bros.; Formats: CD box set	—	—	—	—	—	—	—	—	—	—	
R.E.M.: Singles Collected	Released: October 4, 1994 (US); Label: I.R.S.; Formats: CD, cassette	—	—	—	—	—	—	—	—	—	—	BPI: Silver
R.E.M.: In the Attic – Alternative Recordings 1985–1989	Released: October 7, 1997 (US); Label: EMI, Capitol; Formats: CD	185	—	—	—	—	—	—	—	—	—	
In Time: The Best of R.E.M. 1988–2003	Released: October 28, 2003 (US); Label: Warner Bros.; Formats: CD, LP, digital download	8	5	1	4	1	7	1	2	1	1	RIAA: Platinum; ARIA: 4× Platinum; BPI: 5× Platinum; BVMI: 2× Platinum; IFPI AUT: Platinum; IFPI SWI: Platinum; NVPI: Gold
iTunes Originals – R.E.M.	Released: December 28, 2004 (US); Label: Warner Bros.; Formats: Digital download	—	—	—	—	—	—	—	—	—	—	
And I Feel Fine... The Best of the I.R.S. Years 1982–1987	Released: September 12, 2006 (US); Label: EMI, Capitol; Formats: CD, LP, digital download	116	—	—	—	80	—	—	—	—	70	
R.E.M. Three	Released: April 16, 2011 (US); Label: Warner Bros.; Formats: 7" box set	—	—	—	—	—	—	—	—	—	—	
Part Lies, Part Heart, Part Truth, Part Garbage 1982–2011	Released: November 15, 2011 (US); Label: Warner Bros.; Formats: CD, LP, digital download	55	71	20	79	15	14	25	—	17	19	BPI: Gold
Complete Rarities: I.R.S. 1982–1987	Released: May 19, 2014 (US); Label: EMI; Formats: Digital download	—	—	—	—	—	—	—	—	—	—	
Complete Warner Bros. Rarities 1988–2011	Released: May 19, 2014 (US); Label: Warner Bros.; Formats: Digital download	—	—	—	—	—	—	—	—	—	—	
7IN—83–88	Released: December 5, 2014; Formats: Box set of 7" singles	—	—	—	—	—	—	—	—	—	—	

=== Remix albums ===
List of R.E.M. remix albums
Title	Album details
r.e.m.IX	Released: 2002 (US); Label: Warner Bros.; Formats: CD, LP

=== Soundtrack albums ===
List of R.E.M. soundtrack albums, with selected chart positions
Title	Album details	Peak chart positions
Title	Album details	US
Man on the Moon (with various artists)	Released: November 23, 1999 (US); Label: Warner Bros.; Formats: CD, LP	109

=== Video albums ===
List of R.E.M. video albums, with selected chart positions and certifications
Title	Album details	Peak chart positions	Certifications
Title	Album details	US Video	Certifications
Succumbs	Released: October 1987 (US); Label: UNI, A&M, Polygram; Formats: Laserdisc, VHS	2	
Pop Screen	Released: May 22, 1990 (US); Label: Warner Bros.; Formats: VHS, DVD, Laserdisc	1	RIAA: Gold
Tourfilm	Released: November 30, 1990 (US); Label: Warner Bros.; Formats: Laserdisc, VHS, DVD	1	RIAA: Gold; ARIA: Gold
This Film Is On	Released: September 24, 1991 (US); Label: Warner Bros.; Formats: VHS, DVD, Laserdisc	7	RIAA: Gold
Parallel	Released: May 30, 1995 (US); Label: Warner Bros.; Formats: Laserdisc, VHS, DVD	7	BPI: Gold
Road Movie	Released: October 8, 1996 (US); Label: Warner Bros.; Formats: VHS, DVD, Laserdisc	3	BPI: Gold
In View: The Best of R.E.M. 1988–2003	Released: October 28, 2003 (US); Label: Warner Bros.; Formats: DVD	19	ARIA: Gold; BPI: Platinum
Perfect Square	Released: March 9, 2004 (US); Label: Warner Bros.; Formats: DVD	3	ARIA: Gold; BPI: Gold
When the Light Is Mine: The Best of the I.R.S. Years 1982–1987	Released: September 12, 2006; Label: Capitol; Formats: DVD	10	
R.E.M. Live	Released: October 16, 2007; Label: Warner Bros.; Formats: DVD	2	
Live from Austin, TX	Released: October 26, 2010 (US); Label: Warner Bros.; Formats: DVD	10	
REMTV	Released: November 24, 2014; Formats: DVD (six discs)		
R.E.M. at the BBC	Released: October 19, 2018; Label: UMC/Concord Records; Formats: 8 CDs and 1 DVD	—	

== Extended plays ==
List of R.E.M. extended plays
Title	Details
Chronic Town	Released: August 24, 1982 (US); Label: I.R.S.; Formats: Cassette, LP, CD (July 1, 2022)
Not Bad for No Tour	Released: 2001; Label: Warner Bros.; Formats: CD
Vancouver Rehearsal Tapes	Released: October 14, 2003 (US); Label: Warner Bros.; Formats: Digital download
Live from London	Released: July 1, 2008 (UK); Label: Warner Bros.; Formats: Digital download
Reckoning Songs from the Olympia	Released: July 3, 2009 (US); Label: Warner Bros.; Formats: Digital download
Deep Cuts: R.E.M.	Released: April 7, 2009 (US); Label: Warner Bros.; Formats: Digital download

== Singles ==
=== 1980s ===
List of singles released in the 1980s, with selected chart positions, showing year released and album name
Title	Year	Peak chart positions										Certifications	Album
Title	Year	US	US Alt.	US Main. Rock	AUS	CAN	GER	IRL	NLD	NZ	UK	Certifications	Album
"Radio Free Europe" (Hib-Tone version)	1981	—	—	—	—	—	—	—	—	—	— (Note: "Radio Free Europe" did not enter the UK Singles Chart, but a re-issue in July 2021 peaked at number 20 on the UK Singles Sales Chart.)		Non-album single
"Radio Free Europe" (I.R.S. version)	1983	78	—	25	—	—	—	—	—	—	—		Murmur
"Talk About the Passion"	1983	—	—	—	—	—	—	—	—	—	—		Murmur
"So. Central Rain (I'm Sorry)"	1984	85	—	43	—	—	—	—	—	—	—		Reckoning
"(Don't Go Back To) Rockville"	1984	—	—	—	—	—	—	—	—	—	—		Reckoning
"Cant Get There from Here"	1985	— (Note: "Cant Get There from Here" did not enter the Billboard Hot 100, but peaked at number 10 on the Bubbling Under Hot 100 Singles chart.)	—	14	—	91	—	—	—	—	—		Fables of the Reconstruction
"Driver 8"	1985	—	—	22	—	—	—	—	—	—	—		Fables of the Reconstruction
"Wendell Gee"	1985	—	—	—	—	—	—	—	—	—	91		Fables of the Reconstruction
"Fall on Me"	1986	94	—	5	—	—	—	—	—	—	—		Lifes Rich Pageant
"Superman"	1986	—	—	17	—	—	—	—	—	—	—		Lifes Rich Pageant
"The One I Love"	1987	9	—	2	84	11	81	5	69	6	16 (Note: "The One I Love" peaked at number 51 upon initial release, but a re-issue in 1991 peaked at number 16.)	BPI: Silver	Document
"It's the End of the World as We Know It (And I Feel Fine)"	1987	69	—	16	—	—	—	22	—	—	39 (Note: "It's the End of the World as We Know It" peaked at number 87 upon initial release, but a re-issue in 1991 peaked at number 39.)	BPI: Gold	Document
"Finest Worksong"	1988	—	—	28	—	—	—	—	—	—	50		Document
"Orange Crush"	1988	—	1	1	15	—	—	21	—	5	28		Green
"Stand"	1989	6	1	1	56	8	—	17	—	23	48		Green
"Pop Song 89"	1989	86	16	14	94	94	—	—	—	—	—		Green
"Get Up"	1989	—	—	—	—	—	—	—	—	—	—		Green
"—" denotes a recording that did not chart or was not released in that territory.

=== 1990s ===
List of singles released in the 1990s, with selected chart positions and certifications, showing year released and album name
Title	Year	Peak chart positions											Certifications	Album
Title	Year	US	US Alt.	US Main. Rock	AUS	CAN	GER	NLD	NOR	SWI	NZ	UK	Certifications	Album
"Losing My Religion"	1991	4	1	1	11	6	—	1	4	11	16	19	RIAA: Platinum; BPI: 3× Platinum; BVMI: Platinum	Out of Time
"Shiny Happy People"	1991	10	3	8	19	3	10	13	10	—	29	6	BPI: Platinum	Out of Time
"Near Wild Heaven"	1991	—	—	—	65	—	46	51	—	—	—	27		Out of Time
"Radio Song"	1991	—	—	43	105	—	—	56	—	—	—	28		Out of Time
"Drive"	1992	28	1	2	34	7	13	13	3	7	5	11		Automatic for the People
"Man on the Moon"	1992	30	2	4	39	3	34	54	—	—	8	18	BPI: Gold	Automatic for the People
"The Sidewinder Sleeps Tonite"	1993	—	24	28	99	60	61	—	—	—	29	17	BPI: Silver	Automatic for the People
"Everybody Hurts"	1993	29	21	—	6	8	83	4	—	—	12	7	ARIA: Gold; BPI: Platinum	Automatic for the People
"Nightswimming"	1993	—	—	—	71	—	93	—	—	—	48	27	BPI: Silver	Automatic for the People
"Find the River"	1993	—	—	—	—	—	—	—	—	—	—	54		Automatic for the People
"What's the Frequency, Kenneth?"	1994	21	1	2	24	2	74	21	9	22	4	9	BPI: Silver	Monster
"Bang and Blame"	1994	19	1	3	29	1	74	24	—	—	17	15		Monster
"Strange Currencies"	1995	47	14	8	100	13	—	41	—	—	—	9		Monster
"Crush with Eyeliner"	1995	— (Note: "Crush with Eyeliner" did not enter the Billboard Hot 100, but peaked at number 13 on the Bubbling Under Hot 100 Singles chart, which acts as a 25-song extension to the Hot 100.)	33	20	55	28	—	—	—	—	—	23		Monster
"Tongue"	1995	—	—	—	—	—	—	—	—	—	—	13		Monster
"E-Bow the Letter"	1996	49	2	15	23	6	65	—	6	22	32	4		New Adventures in Hi-Fi
"Bittersweet Me"	1996	46	6	7	90	6	93	—	—	—	—	19		New Adventures in Hi-Fi
"Electrolite"	1996	96	—	—	—	24	83	92	—	—	—	29		New Adventures in Hi-Fi
"How the West Was Won and Where It Got Us"	1997	—	—	—	—	—	—	—	—	—	—	—		New Adventures in Hi-Fi
"Daysleeper"	1998	57	18	30	57	5	57	64	12	49	18	6		Up
"Lotus"	1998	—	31	31	—	32	—	—	—	—	50	26		Up
"At My Most Beautiful"	1999	—	—	—	—	—	—	—	—	—	—	10		Up
"Suspicion"	1999	—	—	—	—	—	—	—	—	—	—	—		Up
"The Great Beyond"	1999	57	11	33	25	16	56	91	8	—	—	3	BPI: Silver	Man on the Moon soundtrack
"—" denotes a recording that did not chart or was not released in that territory.

=== 2000s ===
List of singles released in the 2000s, with selected chart positions and certifications, showing year released and album name
Title	Year	Peak chart positions										Certifications	Album
Title	Year	US	US AAA	AUS	CAN	GER	IRL	NLD	NOR	SWI	UK	Certifications	Album
"Imitation of Life"	2001	83	1	32	5	35	12	54	4	27	6	BPI: Silver	Reveal
"All the Way to Reno (You're Gonna Be a Star)"	2001	—	8	—	—	92	34	—	—	—	24		Reveal
"I'll Take the Rain"	2001	—	—	—	—	—	—	—	—	—	44		Reveal
"Bad Day"	2003	—	1	22	17	39	11	68	11	39	8		In Time: The Best of R.E.M. 1988–2003
"Animal"	2004	—	—	93	—	—	30	—	—	—	33		In Time: The Best of R.E.M. 1988–2003
"Leaving New York"	2004	—	1	57	—	16	14	43	7	18	5		Around the Sun
"Aftermath"	2004	—	12	—	—	78	—	44	—	—	41		Around the Sun
"Electron Blue"	2005	—	—	—	—	—	43	—	—	—	26		Around the Sun
"Wanderlust"	2005	—	—	—	—	—	48	—	—	—	27		Around the Sun
"#9 Dream"	2007	— (Note: "#9 Dream" did not enter the Billboard Hot 100, but peaked at number one on the Bubbling Under Hot 100 Singles chart, which acts as a 25-song extension to the Hot 100.)	28	—	—	—	—	—	—	—	—		Instant Karma: The Amnesty International Campaign to Save Darfur
"Supernatural Superserious"	2008	85	1	—	50	26	41	44	1	21	54	IFPI NOR: Platinum	Accelerate
"Hollow Man"	2008	—	7	—	—	—	—	—	—	—	200		Accelerate
"Man-Sized Wreath"	2008	—	—	—	—	—	—	—	—	—	— (Note: "Man Sized Wreath" did not enter the UK Singles Chart, but peaked at no. 35 on the UK Physical Singles Sales Chart.)		Accelerate
"Until the Day Is Done"	2008	—	—	—	—	—	—	—	—	49	—		Accelerate
"—" denotes a recording that did not chart or was not released in that territory.

=== 2010s ===
List of singles released in the 2010s, with selected chart positions, showing year released and album name
Title	Year	Peak chart positions										Album
Title	Year	US AAA	US Rock	AUT	BEL (FL)	BEL (WA)	GER	JPN	MEX Air.	SWI	VEN	Album
"It Happened Today"	2010	—	—	—	—	—	—	—	—	—	—	Collapse into Now
"Mine Smell Like Honey"	2011	8	46	—	—	—	—	—	36	—	—	Collapse into Now
"Überlin"	2011	26	—	—	52	59	—	39	32	—	—	Collapse into Now
"Oh My Heart"	2011	—	—	47	—	—	46	—	—	60	—	Collapse into Now
"Discoverer"	2011	28	—	—	—	—	—	—	—	—	—	Collapse into Now
"We All Go Back to Where We Belong"	2011	13	—	—	85	79	—	59	—	—	8	Part Lies, Part Heart, Part Truth, Part Garbage 1982–2011
"Photograph"	2017	—	—	—	—	—	—	—	—	—	—	Automatic for the People (25th anniversary edition)
"Fascinating"	2019	—	—	—	—	—	—	—	—	—	—	Non-album single
"—" denotes a recording that did not chart or was not released in that territory.

=== Fan club-exclusive holiday singles ===
From 1988 through 2011, R.E.M. rewarded members of their official fan club with special, exclusive Christmas singles. These singles featured exclusive content, such as recordings of Christmas songs, cover songs, original material and live content.

On September 21, 2011, R.E.M. announced on their official website that their fan club would no longer accept new members or renewals following their disbandment. Consequently, Christmas singles ceased continuation that year, with an overall total of 24 singles.

List of singles with year of release and content
Single	Year	Tracks	Details
Christmas Fan Club Single 1988	1988	A. "Parade of the Wooden Soldiers" B. "See No Evil"	Released December 1988; Label: R.E.M./Athens, Ltd; Format: 7"; Limited to 3,000 copies
Christmas '89	1989	A. "Good King Wenceslas" B. "Academy Fight Song"	Released: December 1989; Label: R.E.M./Athens, Ltd; Format: 7"; Limited to 4,500 copies
1990 Holiday Single	1990	A. "Ghost Reindeer in the Sky" B. "Summertime"	Released: December 1990; Label: R.E.M./Athens, Ltd; Format: 7"; Limited to 6,000 copies
Holly Jolly 1991 Single	1991	A. "Baby Baby" B. "Christmas Griping"	Released December 1991; Label: R.E.M./Athens, Ltd; Format: 7"; Limited to 4,000 copies
Mystic & Merry 1992 Single	1992	A. "Where's Captain Kirk?" B. "Toyland"	Released December 1992; Label: R.E.M./Athens, Ltd; Format: 7"; Limited to 6,000 copies
1993 Happy Holiday Hoedown Single	1993	A. "Silver Bells" B. "Christmas Time Is Here"	Released December 1993; Label: R.E.M./Athens, Ltd; Format: 7"; Limited to 6,000 copies
1994 Yuletide Lite Fan Club 45	1994	A. "Sex Bomb" B. "Christmas in Tunisia"	Released December 1994; Label: R.E.M./Athens, Ltd; Format: 7"; Limited to 6,000 copies
1995 Fan Club Single Served Fresh And Hot	1995	A. "Wicked Game" B. "Java"	Released: December 1995; Label: R.E.M./Athens, Ltd; Format: 7"; Limited to 6,000 copies
1996 Fan Club Single	1996	A. "Only in America" B. "I Will Survive"	Released December 1996; Label: R.E.M./Athens, Ltd; Format: 7"; Limited to 7,500 copies
1997 Holiday Fan Club Single	1997	A. "Live for Today" B. "Happy When I'm Crying" (performed by Pearl Jam)	Released December 1997; Label: R.E.M./Athens, Ltd; Format: 7"; Limited to 7,500 copies.; Also released by Pearl Jam as a Ten Club holiday single with the sides switched.
1998 Holiday Fanclub Video	1998	1. "E-Bow the Letter" (live) (R.E.M. featuring Thom Yorke); 2. "Lucky" (live) (Radiohead featuring Michael Stipe)	Released December 1998; Label: R.E.M./Athens, Ltd; Format: VHS; Recorded June 14, 1998 at the Tibetan Freedom Concert, RFK Stadium, Washington, DC
1999 Holiday Single	1999	1. "Country Feedback" (live) (R.E.M. with Neil Young, Scott McCaughey, Ken Stringfellow & Joey Waronker); 2. "Ambulance Blues" (Neil Young with Peter Buck, Mike Mills, Scott McCaughey, Ken Stringfellow & Joey Waronker)	Released December 1999; Label: R.E.M./Athens, Ltd; Format: CD; Recorded October 18, 1998 at the Bridge School Benefit, Shoreline Amphitheatre, Mountain View, California
R.E.M. Holiday Single 2000	2000	A. "Christmas Time (Is Here Again)" B1. "Hastings and Main" B2. "Take Seven"	Released December 2000; Label: R.E.M./Athens, Ltd; Format: 7"
2001 Holiday Single	2001	1. "Let Me In" (live); 2. "Find the River" (Athens rehearsal); Video: "Find the River" (Athens rehearsal video)	Released December 2001; Label: R.E.M./Athens, Ltd; Format: Enhanced CD; Track 1 recorded October 21, 2001 in Mountain View, California; Track 2 recorded October 16, 2001 at Rehearsal Studio in Athens, Georgia; Video shot October 16, 2001 at Rehearsal Studio in Athens, Georgia
2002 Holiday Single	2002	1. "No Matter What"; 2. "Jesus Christ"; Video: Michael Stipe reading selected works of Martin Luther King Jr.	Released December 2002; Label: R.E.M./Athens, Ltd; Format: Enhanced CD
R.E.M. 2003	2003	1. "Country Feedback" (live) (with Wilco); 2. "It's the End of the World as We Know It (And I Feel Fine)" (with Wilco)	Released December 2003; Label: R.E.M./Athens, Ltd; Format: CD; Recorded September 14, 2003 at Red Rocks
R.E.M. 2004	2004	1. "I Wanted to Be Wrong" (live); 2. "She Just Wants to Be" (live)	Released December 2004; Label: R.E.M./Athens, Ltd; Format: CD; Recorded September 15, 2004 at St. James Church, London
R.E.M. 2005	2005	1. "Turn You Inside-Out" (live video); 2. "The Great Beyond" (live video)	Released December 2005; Label: R.E.M./Athens, Ltd; Format: DVD; Filmed July 3, 2005 in Werchter, Belgium
R.E.M. 2006	2006	1. "Tongue" (live) (performed by Tin Cup Prophette); 2. "So. Central Rain (I'm Sorry)" (live); 3. "These Days" (live) (performed by The Observatory and Bill Doss); 4. "Begin the Begin" (live)	Released December 2006; Label: R.E.M./Athens, Ltd; Format: CD; Recorded September 12, 2006 at the 40 Watt Club, Athens, Georgia
R.E.M. 2007	2007	1. "Merry Xmas Everybody"; 2. "Magnetic North"	Released December 2007; Label: R.E.M./Athens, Ltd; Format: CD
R.E.M. 2008	2008	1. "Living Well is the Best Revenge" (live); 2. "Let Me In" (live); 3. "Just a Touch" (live)	Released December 2008; Label: R.E.M./Athens, Ltd; Format: DVD; Track 1 recorded September 27, 2008 in Torino, Italy; Track 2 recorded June 11, 2008 in Washington, DC; Track 3 recorded October 1, 2008 in Madrid, Spain
R.E.M. 2009	2009	1. "Santa Baby" (performed by Mike Mills); 2. "Crazy Like a Fox" (performed by Mike Mills, Bill Berry and John Keane)	Released December 2009; Label: R.E.M./Athens, Ltd; Format: CD
R.E.M. 2010	2010	1. "Christmas (Baby Please Come Home)"; 2. "IHT->U->EDIYTW" (dubmix)	Released December 2010; Label: R.E.M./Athens, Ltd; Format: CD
2011 R.E.M.	2011	1. "Perfect Circle" (live); 2. "Life and How to Live It" (live)	Released December 2011; Label: R.E.M./Athens, Ltd; Format: CD; Track 1 recorded August 30, 2008 in Twickenham; Track 2 recorded November 18, 2008 in Mexico City

== Other charted songs / promo singles ==
List of R.E.M. songs, with selected chart positions, showing year released and album name
Title	Year	Peak chart positions						Album
Title	Year	US Air.	US Alt.	US Main. Rock	CAN	NOR	UK	Album
"Pretty Persuasion"	1984	—	—	44	—	—	—	Reckoning
"Ages of You"	1987	—	—	39	—	—	—	Dead Letter Office
"Turn You Inside-Out"	1989	—	10	7	—	—	—	Green
"Texarkana"	1991	—	4	7	52	—	—	Out of Time
"Ignoreland"	1992	—	5	4	43	—	—	Automatic for the People
"First We Take Manhattan"	1992	—	11	—	—	—	—	I'm Your Fan
"Photograph" (with Natalie Merchant)	1993	—	9	—	—	—	—	Born to Choose
"Star 69"	1995	74	8	15	73	—	—	Monster
"I Took Your Name"	1995	—	—	—	—	—	—	Monster
"The Wake-Up Bomb"	1997	—	—	30	51	—	—	New Adventures in Hi-Fi
"Everybody Hurts" (live)	2007	—	—	—	—	—	116	R.E.M. Live
"Losing My Religion" (live)	2007	—	—	—	—	—	123	R.E.M. Live
"Living Well Is the Best Revenge"	2008	—	—	—	—	20	—	Accelerate

== Other appearances ==
List of other R.E.M. appearances that are exclusive to compilations and soundtracks, showing year released and album name
Title	Year	Album
"Wind Out"	1984	Bachelor Party
"Ages of You" (live)	1986	Live! for Life
"(All I Have To Do Is) Dream"	1987	Athens, GA: Inside/Out soundtrack
"Swan Swan H"	1987	Athens, GA: Inside/Out soundtrack
"Romance"	1987	Made in Heaven soundtrack
"Deck the Halls"	1988	Winter Warnerland
"I Walked with a Zombie"	1990	Where the Pyramid Meets the Eye: A Tribute to Roky Erickson
"First We Take Manhattan"	1991	I'm Your Fan
"Fretless"	1991	Until the End of the World soundtrack
"Photograph" (with Natalie Merchant)	1993	Born to Choose
"Half a World Away" (live)	1994	The Unplugged Collection, Volume One
"Wall of Death"	1994	Beat the Retreat: Songs by Richard Thompson
"Love Is All Around"	1996	I Shot Andy Warhol Soundtrack
"Sponge"	1996	Sweet Relief II: Gravity of the Situation
"Star Me Kitten"	1996	Songs in the Key of X:Music from and Inspired by The X-Files
"Revolution"	1997	Batman & Robin soundtrack
"Leave" (alternate version)	1997	A Life Less Ordinary Soundtrack
"Draggin' the Line"	1999	Austin Powers: The Spy Who Shagged Me soundtrack
"The Great Beyond"	1999	Man on the Moon soundtrack
"All the Right Friends"	2001	Music from Vanilla Sky
"#9 Dream"	2007	Instant Karma
"Gentle on My Mind" (live)	2007	Sounds Eclectic: The Covers Project
"Munich" (live)	2008	Radio 1's Live Lounge – Volume 3
"World Leader Pretend" (live)	2016	30 Days, 30 Songs

== Music videos ==
List of R.E.M. music videos, showing year released and directors
Title	Year	Director(s)
"Wolves, Lower"	1982	Jonathan Dayton and Valerie Faris
"Radio Free Europe"	1983	Arthur Pierson
"Pretty Persuasion"	1984	
"So. Central Rain (I'm Sorry)"	1984	Howard Libov
Left of Reckoning (Note: Left of Reckoning is a short film that utilizes five songs from the "Left" side of the album Reckoning as its soundtrack; "Harborcoat", "7 Chinese Bros.", "So. Central Rain (I'm Sorry)", "Pretty Persuasion" and "Time After Time (Annelise)". Segments of the film were broadcast by television network MTV, and served as music videos for the respective songs that accompanied each segment.)	1984	James Herbert
"Cant Get There from Here"	1985	Michael Stipe, Rick Aguar
"Driver 8"	1985	Michael Stipe, James Herbert
"Feeling Gravitys Pull"	1985	James Herbert
"Green Grow the Rushes"	1985	James Herbert
"Life and How to Live It"	1985	James Herbert
"Fall on Me"	1986	Michael Stipe
"Dream (All I Have to Do)"	1986	—
"Swan Swan H"	1986	Tony Gayton
"The One I Love"	1987	Robert Longo
"It's the End of the World as We Know It (And I Feel Fine)"	1988	James Herbert
"Finest Worksong"	1988	Michael Stipe
"Talk About the Passion"	1988	Jem Cohen
"Orange Crush"	1988	Matt Mahurin
"Stand"	1989	Katherine Dieckmann
"Turn You Inside-Out"	1989	James Herbert
"Pop Song 89"	1989	Michael Stipe
"Get Up"	1989	Eric Darnell
"Losing My Religion"	1991	Tarsem Singh
"Shiny Happy People"	1991	Katherine Dieckmann
"Near Wild Heaven"	1991	Jeff Preiss
"Radio Song"	1991	Peter Care
"Love Is All Around" (live)	1991	Beth McCarthy
"Losing My Religion" (live)	1991	—
"Low"	1991	James Herbert
"Belong"	1991	Jem Cohen
"Half a World Away"	1991	Jim McKay
"Country Feedback"	1991	Jem Cohen
"Drive"	1992	Peter Care
"Man on the Moon"	1992	Peter Care
"The Sidewinder Sleeps Tonite"	1993	Kevin Kerslake
"Everybody Hurts"	1993	Jake Scott
"Nightswimming"	1993	Jem Cohen
"Find the River"	1993	Jodi Wille
"What's the Frequency, Kenneth?"	1994	Peter Care
"Bang and Blame"	1994	Randy Skinner
"Crush with Eyeliner"	1994	Spike Jonze
"Strange Currencies"	1994	Mark Romanek
"Star 69"	1995	Jonathan Dayton and Valerie Faris
"Tongue"	1995	Jonathan Dayton and Valerie Faris
"The Wake-Up Bomb"	1995	Bruce Gowers
"E-Bow the Letter"	1996	Jem Cohen, Michael Stipe
"Bittersweet Me"	1996	Dominic DeJoseph
"Electrolite"	1996	Peter Care, Spike Jonze
"How the West Was Won and Where It Got Us"	1997	Lance Bangs
"New Test Leper"	1997	Lance Bangs, Dominic DeJoseph
"Daysleeper"	1998	The Snorri Brothers
"Lotus"	1998	Stéphane Sednaoui
"Suspicion"	1998	
"At My Most Beautiful"	1999	Nigel Dick
"The Great Beyond"	1999	Liz Friedlander
"Imitation of Life"	2001	Garth Jennings
"All the Way to Reno (You're Gonna Be a Star)"	2001	Michael Moore
"I'll Take the Rain"	2001	Yoshitomo Nara, David Weir
"Bad Day"	2003	Tim Hope
"Animal"	2003	Motion Theory
"Leaving New York"	2004	Blue Leach, Peter Care
"Aftermath"	2004	Blue Leach, Peter Care
"Supernatural Superserious"	2008	Vincent Moon
"Living Well Is the Best Revenge"	2008	Vincent Moon
"Hollow Man"	2008	Crush
"Man-Sized Wreath"	2008	Crush
"Until the Day Is Done"	2008	Vincent Moon
"Mine Smell Like Honey"	2011	Dominic J. DeJoseph
"Überlin"	2011	Sam Taylor-Wood
"It Happened Today"	2011	Tom Gilroy
"Oh My Heart"	2011	Jem Cohen
"Alligator_Aviator_Autopilot_Antimatter"	2011	Lance Bangs
"Walk It Back"	2011	Sophie Calle
"All the Best"	2011	James Herbert
"Every Day Is Yours to Win"	2011	Jim McKay, Chris Moukarbel, Valerie Veatch
"Discoverer"	2011	Michael Stipe, Lynda Stipe
"We All Go Back to Where We Belong" (version 1)	2011	Dominic J. DeJoseph, Michael Stipe
"We All Go Back to Where We Belong" (version 2)	2011	Dominic J. DeJoseph, Michael Stipe
"Blue"	2012	James Franco
