= Complete Rarities: Warner Bros. 1988–2011 =

Compilation album by R.E.M.
- Released: May 19, 2014
- Recorded: 1988–2011
- Genre: Alternative rock
- Length: 506:08
- Label: Warner Bros.
- Producers: Bill Berry; Peter Buck; Jacknife Lee; Scott Litt; Pat McCarthy; Mike Mills; Michael Stipe

R.E.M. chronology
Complete Rarities: I.R.S. 1982–1987 (2014)	Complete Rarities: Warner Bros. 1988–2011 (2014)	REMTV (2014)

Complete Rarities: Warner Bros. 1988–2011 is a 2014 compilation album featuring live songs, singles' b-sides and non-album tracks recorded by alternative rock band R.E.M. during their tenure on Warner Bros. Records. All material has been previously released either physically or in digital-only formats.

Despite the title, many previously released songs and several digital-only releases are not in the compilation. Examples include "Forty Second Song", "Fruity Organ", "Organ Song", "Radio Song" (Tower of Luv Bug Mix), "New Orleans Instrumental No. 1" (Long Version), "New Orleans Instrumental No. 2", the Monster-era instrumentals, the Live at Greensboro EP, the Not Bad for No Tour EP, the iTunes Originals EP, most of the Collapse into Now live in-studio songs and some compilation tracks like "Photograph", "Draggin the Line", "#9 Dream" and "I Walked with a Zombie".

There was no CD release for this album, instead only being available digitally. As of August 2025, it is available to stream on Tidal, Spotify, and Apple Music.

== Track listing ==
The track listing is sorted into 45 separate discs, with each disc representing the track's original release (CD Single, EP, etc.). The discs are presented chronologically; starting with the "Get Up" CD single in 1989, and ending with the "Oh My Heart" CD single in 2011. There are 131 tracks in total.

All songs written by Bill Berry, Peter Buck, Mike Mills and Michael Stipe except as indicated.

See section "Known issues" below for tracks marked with [A], [B], [C], etc.

Disc 1: From the "Get Up" CD single (Released January 1989)

1. "Funtime" (David Bowie, Iggy Pop) (non-album Iggy Pop cover) – 2:14

Disc 2: From the "Orange Crush" CD single (Released May 1989)

1. "Ghost Rider" (Alan Vega, Martin Rev) (non-album Suicide cover) – 3:46
2. "Dark Globe" (Syd Barrett) (non-album Syd Barrett cover) – 1:53

Disc 3: From the "Pop Song 89" CD single (Released May 1989)

1. "Pop Song 89" (acoustic version) – 2:57

Disc 4: Track 1 from the US "Stand" CD single (Released January 1989) / Track 2 from the UK "Stand" CD single (Released July 1989)

1. "Memphis Train Blues" (non-album instrumental track) – 1:40
2. "Skin Tight" (Williams, Satchell, "Sugarfoot", Jones, Middlebrooks, Pierce) (live in Orlando, FL, April 30, 1989) (non-album Ohio Players cover) – 2:04

Disc 5: Represents the "Losing My Religion" CD single (Released February 1991) †

1. "Losing My Religion" (acoustic live at KFOG, San Francisco) (from the iTunes-only Losing My Religion EP) – 4:44
2. "Losing My Religion" (live in Dublin, 2005) (from R.E.M. Live) – 4:53
3. "Rotary Eleven" (non-album track) – 2:32

Disc 6: From the "Radio Song" CD single (Released November 1991)

1. "You Are the Everything" (live in Greensboro Coliseum, NC, November 10, 1989) – 4:44
2. "Love Is All Around" (Reg Presley) (live The Troggs cover) – 3:13

Disc 7: From the "Shiny Happy People" CD single (Released May 1991)

1. "Shiny Happy People" ("Dance to the Music" Mix) – 4:45
2. "Shiny Happy People" (Pop Mix) – 4:05
3. "Shiny Happy People" (Hip Mix) – 3:37

Disc 8: From the "Drive" CD single (Released September 1992)

1. "It's a Free World Baby" (non-album track, from The Coneheads soundtrack) – 5:12
2. "Winged Mammal Theme" (non-album instrumental track) – 2:56
3. "First We Take Manhattan" (Leonard Cohen) (non-album cover, from I'm Your Fan: The Songs of Leonard Cohen) – 6:04

Disc 9: From the "Everybody Hurts" CD single (Released April 1993)

1. "Everybody Hurts" (album fade) – 4:59
2. "Mandolin Strum" (non-album instrumental track) – 3:46
3. "Orange Crush" (live) – 4:00

Disc 10: From the "Man on the Moon" CD single (Released November 1992)

1. "Man on the Moon" (album edit) – 4:45
2. "Arms of Love" (Robyn Hitchcock) (non-album Robyn Hitchcock cover) – 3:32

Disc 11: From the "Nightswimming" CD single (Released July 1993)

1. "World Leader Pretend" (live in Charleston, WV, April 28, 1991) – 5:16
2. "Belong" (live in Charleston, WV, April 28, 1991) – 4:40
3. "Low" (live in Charleston, WV, April 28, 1991) – 4:59

Disc 12: From "The Sidewinder Sleeps Tonite" CD single (Released February 1993)

1. "The Lion Sleeps Tonight" (Solomon Linda, Hugo Peretti, Luigi Creatore, George David Weiss, Albert Stanton) (non-album The Tokens (version) cover) – 2:41
2. "Fretless" (non-album track, from Until the End of the World soundtrack) – 4:50

Disc 13: From the "Find the River" CD single (Released November 1993)

1. "Everybody Hurts" (live at the MTV Video Awards, Los Angeles, September 2, 1993) – 5:33
2. "Orange Crush" (instrumental version) – 3:49

Disc 14: From the "Crush with Eyeliner" CD single (Released January 1995 (UK) / August 1995 (US))

1. "Fall on Me" (live at the 40 Watt Club, Athens, GA, November 19, 1992) – 3:23
2. "Me in Honey" (live at the 40 Watt Club, Athens, GA, November 19, 1992) – 4:16
3. "Finest Worksong" (live at the 40 Watt Club, Athens, GA, November 19, 1992) – 4:11

Disc 15: From the "Strange Currencies" CD single (Released April 1995)

1. "Drive" (live at the 40 Watt Club, Athens, GA, November 19, 1992) – 4:17^{[A]}
2. "Funtime" (Bowie, Pop) (Iggy Pop cover, live at the 40 Watt Club, Athens, GA, November 19, 1992) – 2:16
3. "Radio Free Europe" (live at the 40 Watt Club, Athens, GA, November 19, 1992) – 4:43

Disc 16: From the "Tongue" CD single (Released July 1995)

1. "What's the Frequency, Kenneth?" (live at Saturday Night Live (SNL), New York, November 12, 1994) – 4:06
2. "Bang and Blame" (live at SNL, November 12, 1994) – 4:54
3. "I Don't Sleep, I Dream" (live at SNL, November 12, 1994) – 3:50

Disc 17: From the "What's the Frequency, Kenneth?" CD single (Released September 1994)

1. "What's the Frequency, Kenneth?" (radio version) – 3:59
2. "Monty Got a Raw Deal" (live at the 40 Watt Club, Athens, GA, November 19, 1992) – 4:22
3. "Everybody Hurts" (live at the 40 Watt Club, Athens, GA, November 19, 1992) – 5:42
4. "Man on the Moon" (live at the 40 Watt Club, Athens, GA, November 19, 1992) – 5:23

Disc 18: From the "Bang and Blame" CD single (Released October 1994 (UK) / January 1995 (US))

1. "Bang and Blame" (alternate version without between-track noise) – 4:52
2. "Losing My Religion" (live at the 40 Watt Club, Athens, GA, November 19, 1992) (applause faded) – 4:43
3. "Country Feedback" (live at the 40 Watt Club, Athens, GA, November 19, 1992) (applause faded) – 4:19
4. "Begin the Begin" (live at the 40 Watt Club, Athens, GA, November 19, 1992) – 3:48

Disc 19: From the "Bittersweet Me" CD single (Released October 1996)

1. "Undertow" (live at Omni Coliseum, Atlanta, GA, November 18, 1995) – 5:05
2. "Wichita Lineman" (Jimmy Webb) (live Glen Campbell cover) – 3:18
3. "New Test Leper" (live acoustic) – 5:29

Disc 20: From the "E-Bow the Letter" CD single (Released August 1996)

1. "Tricycle" (non-album instrumental track) – 1:58
2. "Departure" (live in Rome soundcheck) – 3:33
3. "Wall of Death" (Richard Thompson) (live cover, from Beat the Retreat: Songs by Richard Thompson) – 3:08

Disc 21: From the "Electrolite" CD single (Released December 1996 (UK) / February 1997 (US))

1. "The Wake Up Bomb" (live at Omni Coliseum, Atlanta, GA, November 18, 1995) – 5:08
2. "Binky the Doormat" (live at Omni Coliseum, Atlanta, GA, November 18, 1995) – 5:02
3. "King of Comedy" (808 State Remix) – 5:37

Disc 22: From the "How the West Was Won and Where It Got Us" CD single (Released April 1997)

1. "Be Mine" (Mike on Bus Version) – 4:54
2. "Love Is All Around" (Reg Presley) (non-album The Troggs cover, from I Shot Andy Warhol soundtrack) – 3:02
3. "Sponge" (Vic Chesnutt) (non-album cover, from Sweet Relief II: Gravity of the Situation) – 4:05

Disc 23: From the "Daysleeper" CD single (Released October 1998)

1. "Emphysema" (Buck, Mills, Stipe) (non-album instrumental track) – 4:24
2. "Sad Professor" (Buck, Mills, Stipe) (live in studio version) – 4:01
3. "Why Not Smile" (Buck, Mills, Stipe) (Oxford American version) – 4:01

Disc 24: From the "Lotus" CD single (Released December 1998)

1. "Surfing the Ganges" (Buck, Mills, Stipe) (non-album instrumental track) – 2:28
2. "Suspicion" (Buck, Mills, Stipe) (live at Toast Studios) – 5:39
3. "Lotus" (Buck, Mills, Stipe) (Weird Mix) – 4:34

Disc 25: From the "Suspicion" CD single (Released June 1999)

1. "Electrolite" (live from Later... with Jools Holland, 1998) – 3:58
2. "Man on the Moon" (live from Later... with Jools Holland, 1998) – 5:15
3. "Suspicion" (Buck, Mills, Stipe) (live at Ealing Studios) – 5:27

Disc 26: From the "At My Most Beautiful" CD single (Released March 1999)

1. "At My Most Beautiful" (Buck, Mills, Stipe) (radio remix) – 3:33
2. "The Passenger" (Iggy Pop, Ricky Gardiner) (live from Later... with Jools Holland, 1998) – 7:11
3. "Country Feedback" (live from Later... with Jools Holland, 1998) – 6:51
4. "So. Central Rain" (live from Later... with Jools Holland, 1998) – 4:04

Disc 27: From "The Great Beyond" CD single (Released January 2000)

1. "The Great Beyond" (Buck, Mills, Stipe) (radio edit) (non-album track, from the Man on the Moon soundtrack) – 4:14
2. "The One I Love" (live from the Glastonbury Festival, 1999) – 3:10
3. "Everybody Hurts" (live from the Glastonbury Festival, 1999) – 6:21
4. "Man on the Moon" (live from the Glastonbury Festival, 1999) – 5:24

Disc 28: From the "All the Way to Reno (You're Gonna Be a Star)" CD single (Released July 2001)

1. "Yellow River" (Jeff Christie) (non-album Christie cover) – 2:35
2. "165 Hillcrest" (Buck, Mills, Stipe) (non-album instrumental track) – 1:35
3. "Imitation of Life" (Buck, Mills, Stipe) (live from Trafalgar Square) – 3:54

Disc 29: From the "I'll Take the Rain" CD single (Released November 2001)

1. "Summer Turns to High" (Buck, Mills, Stipe) (32 Chord Song demo) – 3:10
2. "I've Been High" (Buck, Mills, Stipe) (live video version, Channel V, Sydney) – 3:17

Disc 30: From the "Imitation of Life" CD single (Released April 2001)

1. "The Lifting" (Buck, Mills, Stipe) (original version) – 5:20^{[B]}
2. "Beat a Drum" (Buck, Mills, Stipe) (Dalkey Demo) – 4:26
3. "2JN" (Buck, Mills, Stipe) (non-album track) – 3:26

Disc 31: From the "Bad Day" CD single (Released October 2003)

1. "Favorite Writer" (Linda Hopper, Ruthie Morris) (non-album Magnapop cover) – 2:57
2. "Out in the Country" (Paul Williams, Roger Nichols) (non-album Paul Williams cover) – 3:23
3. "Adagio" (non-album instrumental track) (Buck, Mills, Stipe) – 3:29

Disc 32: From the In Time: The Best of R.E.M. 1988-2003 bonus disc (Released October 2003) ‡

1. "Turn You Inside-Out" (live) – 4:27^{[C]}
2. "Chance (Dub)" (non-album track) – 2:35
3. "Drive" (live, 1994) – 4:00^{[A]}
4. "Star Me Kitten" (alternate version feat. William S. Burroughs, from Songs in the Key of X: Music from and Inspired by the X-Files) – 3:31
5. "Revolution" (non-album track, from Batman & Robin soundtrack) – 3:05
6. "Leave" (alternate version, from A Life Less Ordinary soundtrack) – 4:42
7. "The Lifting" (Buck, Mills, Stipe) (demo) – 5:20^{[B]}
8. "The One I Love" (live from Triple M Sydney) – 3:24^{[D]}

Disc 33: From the Vancouver Rehearsal Tapes iTunes EP (Released October 2003)

1. "Maps and Legends" (from Vancouver Rehearsal Tapes) – 3:18
2. "Tongue" (from Vancouver Rehearsal Tapes) – 3:52
3. "Little America" (from Vancouver Rehearsal Tapes) – 2:59
4. "So. Central Rain" (from Vancouver Rehearsal Tapes) – 3:29
5. "Imitation of Life" (Buck, Mills, Stipe) (from Vancouver Rehearsal Tapes) – 3:51

Disc 34: From the "Aftermath" CD single (Released November 2004)

1. "So Fast, So Numb" (live in Athens Rehearsal Sessions, 2004) – 3:52^{[E]}
2. "All the Right Friends" (live in Athens Rehearsal Sessions, 2004) – 2:50^{[E]}

Disc 35: From the "Animal" CD single (Released January 2004)

1. "Animal" (new mix) – 3:55
2. "Pretty Persuasion" (live in NYC, 2003) – 4:02^{[E]}
3. "Welcome to the Occupation" (live in NYC, 2003) – 2:46^{[E]}

Disc 36: From the "Leaving New York" CD single (Released September 2004)

1. "You Are the Everything" (live in Raleigh, NC, October 10, 2003) – 3:31^{[E]}
2. "These Days" (live in Toronto, September 30, 2003) – 3:27^{[E]}
3. "(Don't Go Back To) Rockville" (live in Oslo NRK P1 National Radio, October 25, 2003) – 4:35^{[E]}

Disc 37: From the "Wanderlust" CD single (Released July 2005)

1. "Wanderlust" (Buck, Mills, Stipe) (live in Santa Barbara, CA, 2004) – 3:04^{[E]}

Disc 38: From the "Electron Blue" CD Single (Released February 2005)

1. "Sweetness Follows" (live in Cincinnati, October 27, 2004) – 4:04^{[E]}

Disc 39: From the "Hollow Man" CD Single (Released June 2008)

1. "Horse to Water" (live in Vancouver) (Buck, Mills, Stipe) – 2:36
2. "Indian Summer" (Calvin Johnson) (non-album Beat Happening cover) – 5:01

Disc 40: From the iTunes Live from London EP (Released July 2008)

1. "Living Well Is the Best Revenge" (Buck, Mills, Stipe) (from Live from London EP) – 3:16
2. "Auctioneer" (from Live from London EP) – 2:46
3. "Hollow Man" (Buck, Mills, Stipe) (from Live from London EP) – 2:44
4. "Supernatural Superserious" (Buck, Mills, Stipe) (from Live from London EP) – 3:23
5. "Fall on Me" (from Live from London EP) – 2:49
6. "West of the Fields" (from Live from London EP) – 3:14
7. "Horse to Water" (Buck, Mills, Stipe) (from Live from London EP) – 2:18
8. "Man-Sized Wreath" (Buck, Mills, Stipe) (from Live from London EP) – 2:36
9. "Man on the Moon" (from Live from London EP) – 4:53

Disc 41: From the "Man-Sized Wreath" CD single (Released August 2008)

1. "Mr. Richards" (Buck, Mills, Stipe) (live in Vancouver) – 3:54
2. "Living Well Jesus Dog" (Buck, Mills, Stipe) ("Living Well Is The Best Revenge" alternate version) – 4:21

Disc 42: From the "Supernatural Superserious" CD single (Released February 2008)

1. "Airliner" (Buck, Mills, Stipe, Scott McCaughey) (non-album track) – 2:21
2. "Redhead Walking" (Calvin Johnson) (non-album Beat Happening cover) – 2:11

Disc 43: From the "Until the Day Is Done" CD single (Released March 2009)

1. "Houston" (Buck, Mills, Stipe) (live in London) – 2:19

Disc 44: From the Reckoning Songs From the Olympia iTunes EP (Released July 2009)

1. "Harborcoat" (from Live at The Olympia) – 4:13
2. "Letter Never Sent" (from Live at the Olympia) – 3:17
3. "Second Guessing" (from Live at the Olympia) – 2:55
4. "Pretty Persuasion" (from Live at the Olympia) – 4:26

Disc 45: From the "Oh My Heart" CD single (Released February 2011)

1. "Nola - 4/26/10" (Buck, Mills, Stipe) (non-album instrumental track) – 2:53
2. "That Someone Is You" (Buck, Mills, Stipe) (live at Hansa Studios) – 1:45

† Original release only contained the track "Rotary Eleven".

‡ Original release also included a live version of "Country Feedback" from the 2003 Wiesbaden, Germany concert featured on the Perfect Square DVD.

== Known issues ==
As of the original release of this compilation on May 19, 2014, the following track mistakes (marked with [A], [B], [C], etc. on the list above) have been observed on all digital download platforms:

A.^{1} ^{2} Tracks 33 (slightly longer due to more audience noise) and 89 are the same live version of "Drive" from November 19, 1992. It can be found as a B-side on the "Strange Currencies" single and also on the Alternative NRG Greenpeace compilation.
B.^{1} ^{2} Tracks 81 and 93 are both the same demo version for "The Lifting".
C. There is a previous mistake (uncorrected here) with track 87, a live version of "Turn You Inside-Out", which was reported in the entry for In Time: The Best of R.E.M.
D. Track 94 (an acoustic live version of "The One I Love") is listed incorrectly. The correct venue is The Museum of Television and Radio on June 8, 2001. The same version can be found on the compilation In Time: The Best of R.E.M. The 2MMM Sydney version is different from both and can be found on Not Bad for No Tour.
E.^{1} ^{2} ^{3} ^{4} ^{5} ^{6} ^{7} ^{8} ^{9} Tracks 100, 101, and 103–109 originated from a lossy source, even in the FLAC version of the release.

=== Resolved issues ===
The original release of this compilation had a few other mistakes that have been solved by iTunes. Those original files, though, can still be found in many sources and still present the same mistakes.

- Track 1 ("Funtime") was originally listed as a live version, but is actually a studio recording. It is correctly listed on iTunes now.
- Track 14 ("Shiny Happy People" – Hip Mix) had a silent gap from 0:27 to 0:48. That has been fixed by iTunes and the track is available as a whole now.
- Track 20 was listed as "Orange Crush" (live), but was actually a repeat of "Dark Globe". This has been fixed by iTunes and the mistaken track was replaced by the correct song.
