= REMTV =

2014 R.E.M. DVD box set

Video by R.E.M.
- Released: November 24, 2014
- Recorded: various dates and locations; Unplugged: April 10, 1991 in Chelsea Studios and May 21, 2001 in TRL Studio at MTV Studios, both in New York City, New York, United States
- Genre: Alternative rock
- Label: Rhino

R.E.M. chronology
Complete Rarities: Warner Bros. 1988–2011 (2014)	REMTV (2014)	7IN—83–88 (2014)

R.E.M. video chronology
R.E.M. Live from Austin, TX (2010)	REMTV (2014)

REMTV is a six-disc DVD box set collecting appearances by American alternative rock band R.E.M. on MTV and related channels, from 1983 to 2008, released November 24, 2014. The collection was compiled by the former band members as they looked through all of the MTV film footage in their vault to prepare the release of Unplugged: The Complete 1991 and 2001 Sessions.

The box set includes a new documentary on the band, titled R.E.M. by MTV, by Alex Young (producer, director) and Dave Leopold (editor). The documentary is a collage of various R.E.M. interviews and appearances not only on MTV, but on several programs. This film was aired in theaters as a special engagement on May 19, 2015. The documentary had a limited theater release run in 2015.

== Track listing ==
All songs written by Bill Berry, Peter Buck, Mike Mills and Michael Stipe except as indicated.

Disc 1

MTV Unplugged 1991 (April 10, 1991)
1. "Half a World Away"
2. "Disturbance at the Heron House"
3. "Radio Song"
4. "Low"
5. "Perfect Circle"
6. "Fall On Me"
7. "Belong"
8. "Love Is All Around" (Reg Presley)
9. "It's the End of the World as We Know It (And I Feel Fine)"
10. "Losing My Religion"
11. "Pop Song 89"
12. "Endgame"

Outtakes

1. "Fretless"
2. "Swan Swan H"
3. "Rotary Eleven"
4. "Get Up"
5. "World Leader Pretend"

MTV Unplugged 2001 (May 21, 2001)
1. "All the Way to Reno (You're Gonna Be a Star)" (Buck, Mills, Stipe)
2. "Electrolite"
3. "At My Most Beautiful" (Buck, Mills, Stipe)
4. "Daysleeper" (Buck, Mills, Stipe)
5. "So. Central Rain (I'm Sorry)"
6. "Losing My Religion"
7. "Country Feedback"
8. "Cuyahoga"
9. "Imitation of Life" (Buck, Mills, Stipe)
10. "Find the River"

Outtakes

1. "The One I Love"
2. "Disappear" (Buck, Mills, Stipe)
3. "Beat a Drum" (Buck, Mills, Stipe)
4. "I've Been High" (Buck, Mills, Stipe)
5. "I'll Take the Rain" (Buck, Mills, Stipe)
6. "Sad Professor" (Buck, Mills, Stipe)
7. "The Great Beyond" (Buck, Mills, Stipe)

Disc 2

VH1 Storytellers (October 23, 1998)
1. "Electrolite"
2. "Daysleeper" (Buck, Mills, Stipe)
3. "Losing My Religion"
4. "Perfect Circle"
5. "Sad Professor" (Buck, Mills, Stipe)
6. "Fall On Me"
7. "I'm Not Over You" (Buck, Mills, Stipe)
8. "The Apologist" (Buck, Mills, Stipe)
9. "Man on the Moon"

Outtakes

1. "New Test Leper"
2. "Parakeet" (Buck, Mills, Stipe)
3. "(Don't Go Back To) Rockville"
4. "Suspicion" (Buck, Mills, Stipe)
5. "Walk Unafraid" (Buck, Mills, Stipe)
6. "At My Most Beautiful" (Buck, Mills, Stipe)

The Cutting Edge (June 14, 1984)
1. "(Don't Go Back To) Rockville"
2. "Driver 8"
3. "Wendell Gee"
4. "Smokin' in the Boys Room" (Cub Koda, Michael Lutz)
5. "Time After Time (Annelise)"
6. "Driver 8"

Livewire (October 30, 1983)
1. "So. Central Rain (I'm Sorry)"
2. "Carnival of Sorts (Box Cars)"

MTV 10th Anniversary Special (November 10, 1991, featuring members of the Atlanta Symphony Orchestra)
1. "Losing My Religion"

MTV Video Music Awards (September 2, 1993, including Brian Harris and Duane Saetveit)
1. "Everybody Hurts"
2. "Drive"

MTV Video Music Awards (September 7, 1995)
1. "The Wake-Up Bomb"

European Music Awards (November 12, 1998)
1. "Daysleeper" (Buck, Mills, Stipe)

European Music Awards (November 8, 2001)
1. "Imitation of Life" (Buck, Mills, Stipe)

Rock and Roll Hall of Fame Induction (March 12, 2007)
1. "Begin the Begin"
2. "Gardening at Night"
3. "Man on the Moon"

The Colbert Report (April 2, 2008)
1. "Supernatural Superserious" (Buck, Mills, Stipe)

Disc 3

R.E.M. in Dallas (September 19, 1995)
1. "I Took Your Name"
2. "What's the Frequency, Kenneth?"
3. "Crush with Eyeliner"

R.E.M. Uplink at the Bowery Ballroom (October 28, 1998)
1. "Losing My Religion"
2. "Lotus" (Buck, Mills, Stipe)
3. "Daysleeper" (Buck, Mills, Stipe)
4. "E-Bow the Letter"
5. "The Apologist" (Buck, Mills, Stipe)
6. "So. Central Rain (I'm "Sorry)"
7. "Walk Unafraid" (Buck, Mills, Stipe)
8. "Man on the Moon"
9. "Radio Free Europe"

Live in Cologne (May 12, 2001)
1. "All the Way to Reno (You're Gonna Be a Star)" (Buck, Mills, Stipe)
2. "The Lifting" (Buck, Mills, Stipe)
3. "Imitation of Life" (Buck, Mills, Stipe)
4. "The One I Love"
5. "She Just Wants to Be" (Buck, Mills, Stipe)
6. "Walk Unafraid" (Buck, Mills, Stipe)
7. "Losing My Religion"
8. "Man on the Moon"
9. "It's The End Of The World As We Know It (And I Feel Fine)"

Outtakes

1. "What's the Frequency, Kenneth?"
2. "Cuyahoga"
3. "Electrolite"
4. "I've Been High" (Buck, Mills, Stipe)
5. "Find the River"
6. "I'll Take the Rain" (Buck, Mills, Stipe)
7. "At My Most Beautiful" (Buck, Mills, Stipe)
8. "So. Central Rain (I'm Sorry)"

Disc 4

R.E.M. at The Tabernacle, London (March 2, 1999)
1. "Losing My Religion"
2. "Daysleeper" (Buck, Mills, Stipe)
3. "Walk Unafraid" (Buck, Mills, Stipe)
4. "Man on the Moon"
5. "What's the Frequency, Kenneth?"
6. "It's the End of the World as We Know It (And I Feel Fine)"

MTV Supersonic Milan (May 2, 2001)

1. "Losing My Religion"
2. "The Great Beyond" (Buck, Mills, Stipe)
3. "What's the Frequency, Kenneth?"
4. "Daysleeper" (Buck, Mills, Stipe)
5. "All the Way to Reno (You're Gonna Be a Star)"
6. "The Lifting" (Buck, Mills, Stipe)
7. "I'll Take the Rain" (Buck, Mills, Stipe)
8. "I've Been High" (Buck, Mills, Stipe)
9. "Man on the Moon"
10. "She Just Wants to Be" (Buck, Mills, Stipe)
11. "Imitation of Life" (Buck, Mills, Stipe)

Rock am Ring (June 3, 2005)
1. "What's the Frequency, Kenneth?"
2. "Leaving New York" (Buck, Mills, Stipe)
3. "Imitation of Life" (Buck, Mills, Stipe)
4. "Electron Blue" (Buck, Mills, Stipe)
5. "Man on the Moon"

Outtakes

1. "I Took Your Name"
2. "Bad Day"
3. "Drive"
4. "The Outsiders" (Buck, Mills, Stipe)
5. "Leave"
6. "Me in Honey"
7. "Wanderlust" (Buck, Mills, Stipe)
8. "Everybody Hurts"
9. "Electrolite"
10. "Orange Crush"
11. "The One I Love"
12. "Walk Unafraid" (Buck, Mills, Stipe)
13. "Losing My Religion"
14. "Imitation of Life" (Buck, Mills, Stipe)
15. "The Great Beyond" (Buck, Mills, Stipe)
16. "Animal" (Buck, Mills, Stipe)
17. "I'm Gonna DJ" (Buck, Mills, Stipe)

Disc 5

Live at Rolling Stone, Milan (March 18, 2008)
1. "Living Well Is the Best Revenge" (Buck, Mills, Stipe)
2. "Drive"
3. "Accelerate" (Buck, Mills, Stipe)
4. "Hollow Man" (Buck, Mills, Stipe)
5. "Electrolite"
6. "Houston" (Buck, Mills, Stipe)
7. "Supernatural Superserious" (Buck, Mills, Stipe)
8. "Bad Day"
9. "Losing My Religion"
10. "I'm Gonna DJ" (Buck, Mills, Stipe)
11. "Horse to Water" (Buck, Mills, Stipe)
12. "Imitation of Life" (Buck, Mills, Stipe)
13. "Until the Day Is Done" (Buck, Mills, Stipe)
14. "Man on the Moon"

Live at Oxegen Festival (July 12, 2008)
1. "What's the Frequency, Kenneth?"
2. "Drive"
3. "It's the End of the World as We Know It (And I Feel Fine)"
4. "Man-Sized Wreath" (Buck, Mills, Stipe)
5. "I'm Gonna DJ" (Buck, Mills, Stipe)
6. "Supernatural Superserious" (Buck, Mills, Stipe)
7. "Man on the Moon"

R.E.M. in Athens, Greece (October 5, 2008)
1. "Living Well Is the Best Revenge"
2. "What's the Frequency, Kenneth?"
3. "Drive"
4. "Man-Sized Wreath" (Buck, Mills, Stipe)
5. "Bad Day" (Buck, Mills, Stipe)
6. "Electrolite"
7. "(Don't Go Back To) Rockville"
8. "The Great Beyond" (Buck, Mills, Stipe)
9. "The One I Love"
10. "Losing My Religion"
11. "Let Me In"
12. "Orange Crush"
13. "Imitation of Life" (Buck, Mills, Stipe)
14. "Supernatural Superserious" (Buck, Mills, Stipe)
15. "Man on the Moon"

Disc 6

R.E.M. by MTV (original documentary)
Deleted scenes:
1. "Peter"
2. "Politics"
3. "Golf"
4. "The Hornblower Affair"
5. "The Year 2000"

Pre-orders of the album also received a monaural download of the MTV Supersonic show in Milan.
