= Live from Austin, TX (R.E.M. album) =

2010 video album by R.E.M.

Video by R.E.M.
- Released: October 26, 2010
- Recorded: March 13, 2008, Austin, Texas, United States
- Genre: Alternative rock
- Length: 70:02
- Language: English
- Label: New West
- Director: Gary Menotti

R.E.M. chronology
This Is Not a Show (2009)	Live from Austin, TX (2010)	Collapse into Now (2011)

R.E.M. live album chronology
Live at The Olympia (2009)	Live from Austin, TX (2010)

R.E.M. video chronology
Live at The Olympia (2009)	Live from Austin, TX (2010)	REMTV (2014)

Live from Austin, TX is a 2010 video album by R.E.M. recorded on March 13, 2008, for the television series Austin City Limits. The television broadcast aired on PBS starting March 24, 2008.

The DVD includes three songs not broadcast on the television program—"So. Central Rain (I'm Sorry)", "Fall on Me", and "Imitation of Life"; the live performance also featured "Final Straw", "Walk Unafraid", and an alternate version of "Supernatural Superserious".

== Track listing ==
All songs written by Peter Buck, Mike Mills, and Michael Stipe, except where noted.

1. "Living Well Is the Best Revenge" – 3:24
2. "Man-Sized Wreath" – 3:01
3. "Drive" (Bill Berry, Buck, Mills, Stipe) – 5:04
4. "So. Central Rain" (Berry, Buck, Mills, Stipe) – 3:39
5. "Accelerate" – 3:47
6. "Fall on Me" (Berry, Buck, Mills, Stipe) – 3:07
7. "Hollow Man" – 3:20
8. "Electrolite" (Berry, Buck, Mills, Stipe) – 4:55
9. "Houston" – 3:07
10. "Supernatural Superserious" – 3:32
11. "Bad Day" (Berry, Buck, Mills, Stipe) – 4:40
12. "Losing My Religion" (Berry, Buck, Mills, Stipe) – 4:46
13. "I'm Gonna DJ" – 2:31
14. "Horse to Water" – 3:38
15. "Imitation of Life" – 5:21
16. "Until the Day Is Done" – 5:40
17. "Man on the Moon" (Berry, Buck, Mills, Stipe) – 6:30

Tracks 1, 2, 5, 7, 9, 10, 13, 14, 16 all taken from Accelerate.

== Reception ==
Professional ratings
Review scores
Source	Rating
DVD Verdict	Positive
PopMatters	6/10
Record Collector	3/5 stars
Sputnikmusic	3.5/5
Uncut	4/5 stars

The album received mixed and positive reviews.

== Personnel ==
R.E.M.

- Peter Buck – guitar
- Mike Mills – bass guitar, backing vocals, keyboards, piano
- Michael Stipe – vocals

Additional musicians

- Scott McCaughey – guitar, keyboards, backing vocals
- Bill Rieflin – drums, percussion

== See also ==
- List of Austin City Limits performers
