= Live from London (R.E.M. EP) =

Live album by R.E.M.
- Released: July 1, 2008
- Recorded: March 26, 2008, London, United Kingdom
- Genre: Alternative rock
- Length: 27:54
- Language: English

R.E.M. chronology
Accelerate (2008)	Live from London (2008)	Live at The Olympia (2009)

R.E.M. live album chronology
R.E.M. Live (2007)	Live from London (2008)	Live at The Olympia (2009)

Live from London is a live EP by R.E.M. that was recorded on March 26, 2008, and released exclusively on iTunes on July 1, 2008. It is one of several releases in the Live from London series.

== Track listing ==
1. "Living Well Is the Best Revenge" (Peter Buck, Mike Mills, Michael Stipe) – 3:15
2. "Auctioneer (Another Engine)" (Bill Berry, Buck, Mills, Stipe) – 2:46
3. "Hollow Man" (Buck, Mills, Stipe) – 2:44
4. "Supernatural Superserious" (Buck, Mills, Stipe) – 3:22
5. "Fall On Me" (Berry, Buck, Mills, Stipe) – 2:48
6. "West of the Fields" (Berry, Buck, Mills, Stipe, Neil Bogan) – 3:13
7. "Horse to Water" (Buck, Mills, Stipe) – 2:18
8. "Man-Sized Wreath" (Buck, Mills, Stipe) – 2:35
9. "Man on the Moon" (Berry, Buck, Mills, Stipe) – 4:53

Tracks 1, 3, 4, 7 and 8 all from the album Accelerate.

== Songs excluded ==
The following songs were performed and recorded, but not included with the iTunes release:

- "Bad Day"
- "Houston"† (available on the digital single for "Until the Day Is Done")
- "Walk Unafraid"†
- "I'm Gonna DJ"†

== Personnel ==
R.E.M.

- Peter Buck – guitar
- Mike Mills – bass guitar, backing vocals
- Michael Stipe – vocals

Additional musicians

- Scott McCaughey – guitar, background vocals
- Bill Rieflin – drums

== Sales charts ==
The album debuted at 21 on Billboard's Digital Albums.

== See also ==
- Vancouver Rehearsal Tapes
- iTunes Originals – R.E.M.
