= 7IN—83–88 =

Box set by R.E.M.
- Released: December 9, 2014
- Recorded: 1981–1986
- Genre: Alternative rock
- Label: Capitol/I.R.S.
- Producers: Bill Berry, Joe Boyd, Peter Buck, Don Dixon, Mitch Easter, Don Gehman, Scott Litt, Mike Mills, Michael Stipe

R.E.M. chronology
| REMTV (2014) | 7IN—83–88 (2014) | R.E.M. at the BBC (2018) |

7IN—83–88 is a collection of 7-inch singles released by American alternative rock band R.E.M. on December 9 2014. The collection covers their singles released on the I.R.S. label between 1983 and 1988.

== Reception ==
The Line of Best Fit's Alex Lee Thomson gave the collection a nine out of 10, calling it a "'how to' guide for the craft of songwriting and an uncompromising blueprint for independent artists".

== Track listing ==
All songs written by Bill Berry, Peter Buck, Mike Mills, and Michael Stipe, except where noted

- "Radio Free Europe" / "There She Goes Again" (Lou Reed)
- "So. Central Rain (I'm Sorry)" / "King of the Road" (Roger Miller)
- "(Don't Go Back To) Rockville" / "Catapult" (Live)
- "Cant Get There from Here" / "Bandwagon" (Berry, Buck, Mills, Lynda Stipe, and M. Stipe)
- "Driver 8" / "Crazy" (Randy Bewley, Vanessa Briscoe, Curtis Crowe, Michael Lachowski)
- "Wendell Gee" / "Crazy" (Bewley, Briscoe, Crowe, and Lachowski) + "Ages of You" / "Burning Down"
- "Fall On Me" / "Rotary Ten"
- "Superman" (Mitchell Bottler and Gary Zekley) / "White Tornado"
- "The One I Love" / "Maps and Legends" (Live)
- "It's the End of the World as We Know It (And I Feel Fine)" / "Last Date" (Floyd Cramer)
- "Finest Worksong" / "Time After Time" (Live)
