= Live at the Olympia (R.E.M. album) =

Live album by R.E.M.

Live album by R.E.M.
- Released: October 27, 2009
- Recorded: June 30 – July 5, 2007
- Venue: Olympia Theatre, Dublin, Ireland
- Genre: Alternative rock
- Length: 150:41
- Label: Warner Bros.
- Producer: Jacknife Lee

R.E.M. chronology
| Live from London (2008) | Live at the Olympia (2009) | R.E.M. Live from Austin, TX (2010) |

R.E.M. live album chronology
| Live from London (2008) | Live at the Olympia (2009) | R.E.M. Live from Austin, TX (2010) |

R.E.M. video chronology
| R.E.M. Live (2007) | This Is Not a Show (2009) | R.E.M. Live from Austin, TX (2010) |

Live at the Olympia is a live album by American alternative rock band R.E.M. It was recorded during the band's five-night residency at the Olympia Theatre, Dublin, between June 30 and July 5, 2007, and released on October 27, 2009. In this series of "working rehearsals" the songs on Accelerate were debuted, with many still works in progress. Every song from Accelerate appears on the album with the exception of "Hollow Man" and "Sing for the Submarine". The album is a two-CD release, and contains a total of 39 songs. In addition, a DVD with a documentary titled This Is Not a Show directed by Vincent Moon is included. A special edition box set containing the album on four LPs as well as the two CDs and the DVD is also available.

== Promotion ==
To promote the album, R.E.M.'s Dublin website had full streaming clips of "Driver 8", "I've Been High" and "Harborcoat", along with videos for "Living Well Is the Best Revenge" and clips from the Reckoning EP, while the video for "Drive" was made available on R.E.M.'s Myspace page. On October 22, 2009, National Public Radio streamed the entire album for free.

=== Reckoning Songs from the Olympia ===
A digital EP containing songs from the album, Reckoning Songs from the Olympia, was released on July 7, 2009, through the iTunes Store and other distributors. It contains "Harborcoat", "Letter Never Sent", "Second Guessing" and "Pretty Persuasion", songs from the band's 1984 studio album Reckoning.

== Reception ==
Professional ratings
Aggregate scores
| Source | Rating |
|---|---|
| Metacritic | 74/100 |
Review scores
| Source | Rating |
| AllMusic | 4/5 stars |
| The A.V. Club | A− |
| Classic Rock | 8/10 stars |
| Mojo | 2/5 stars |
| Pitchfork | 7.4/10 |
| Q | 4/5 stars |
| Rolling Stone | 3/5 stars |
| Slant Magazine | 3.5/5 stars |
| Uncut | 4/5 stars |

According to the review aggregator Metacritic, Live at the Olympia received "generally favorable reviews" based on a weighted average score of 74 out of 100 from 11 critic scores.

== Track listing ==
All songs written by Bill Berry, Peter Buck, Mike Mills, and Michael Stipe, except where noted.

Disc one

1. "Living Well Is the Best Revenge" (from Accelerate) (Buck, Mills, Stipe) – 4:07
2. "Second Guessing" (from Reckoning) – 2:58
3. "Letter Never Sent" (from Reckoning) – 3:51
4. "Staring Down the Barrel of the Middle Distance" (Previously unreleased) (Buck, Mills, Stipe) – 4:11
5. "Disturbance at the Heron House" (from Document) – 3:41
6. "Mr. Richards" (from Accelerate) (Buck, Mills, Stipe) – 4:17
7. "Houston" (from Accelerate) (Buck, Mills, and Stipe) – 1:54
8. "New Test Leper" (from New Adventures in Hi-Fi) – 5:26
9. "Cuyahoga" (from Lifes Rich Pageant) – 4:22
10. "Electrolite" (from New Adventures in Hi-Fi) – 4:03
11. "Man-Sized Wreath" (from Accelerate) (Buck, Mills, and Stipe) – 3:09
12. "So. Central Rain" (from Reckoning) – 3:44
13. "On the Fly" (Previously unreleased) (Buck, Mills, Stipe) – 5:01
14. "Maps and Legends" (from Fables of the Reconstruction) – 3:10
15. "Sitting Still" (from Murmur) – 3:42
16. "Driver 8" (from Fables of the Reconstruction) – 3:44
17. "Horse to Water" (from Accelerate) (Buck, Mills, and Stipe) – 2:45
18. "I'm Gonna DJ" (from Accelerate) (Buck, Mills, and Stipe) – 2:16
19. "Circus Envy" (from Monster) – 4:27
20. "These Days" (from Lifes Rich Pageant) – 4:53

Disc two

1. "Drive" (from Automatic for the People) – 4:49
2. "Feeling Gravitys Pull" (from Fables of the Reconstruction) – 5:10
3. "Until the Day Is Done" (from Accelerate) (Buck, Mills, and Stipe) – 4:07
4. "Accelerate" (from Accelerate) (Buck, Mills, and Stipe) – 3:35
5. "Auctioneer (Another Engine)" (from Fables of the Reconstruction) – 3:38
6. "Little America" (from Reckoning) – 3:11
7. "1,000,000" (from Chronic Town) – 3:28
8. "Disguised" (early version of "Supernatural Superserious" from Accelerate) (Buck, Mills, and Stipe) – 3:20
9. "The Worst Joke Ever" (from Around the Sun) (Buck, Mills, and Stipe) – 3:42
10. "Welcome to the Occupation" (from Document) – 2:47
11. "Carnival of Sorts (Boxcars) (from Chronic Town) – 4:09
12. "Harborcoat" (from Reckoning) – 4:16
13. "Wolves, Lower" (from Chronic Town) – 4:33
14. "I've Been High" (from Reveal) (Buck, Mills, and Stipe) – 3:40
15. "Kohoutek" (from Fables of the Reconstruction) – 4:12
16. "West of the Fields" (from Murmur) (Berry, Neil Bogan, Buck, Mills, and Stipe) – 4:13
17. "Pretty Persuasion" (from Reckoning) – 4:23
18. "Romance" (from the Made in Heaven soundtrack; appears on Eponymous) – 3:31
19. "Gardening at Night" (from Chronic Town) – 4:16

== The Times Presents R.E.M. Live in Dublin ==
A 10-song live album, with all songs recorded live in Dublin, was made available by UK newspaper The Times as a reader download through the iTunes Store during October 2009. The first five tracks were originally released on R.E.M. Live (recorded on February 26–27, 2005); tracks 6–10 would later gain an official release on the then-upcoming Live at the Olympia.

1. "Losing My Religion" (from Out Of Time) (live in Dublin) – 4:50
2. "Man on the Moon" (from Automatic for the People) (live in Dublin) – 6:45
3. "The One I Love " (from Document) (live in Dublin) – 3:24
4. "Orange Crush" (from Green) (live in Dublin) – 3:56
5. "(Don't Go Back To) Rockville" (from Reckoning) (live in Dublin) – 4:39
6. "Pretty Persuasion" (from Reckoning) (live at The Olympia) – 4:23
7. "Man-Sized Wreath" (from Accelerate) (live at The Olympia) (Buck, Mills, Stipe) – 3:09
8. "Mr. Richards" (from Accelerate) (live at The Olympia) (Buck, Mills, Stipe) – 4:17
9. "Wolves, Lower" (from Chronic Town) (live at The Olympia) – 4:33
10. "I've Been High" (from Reveal) (live at The Olympia) (Buck, Mills, and Stipe) – 3:40

== Personnel ==
R.E.M.

- Peter Buck – guitar, bass guitar on "New Test Leper"
- Mike Mills – bass guitar, background vocals, keyboards, acoustic guitar on "New Test Leper"
- Michael Stipe – vocals, harmonica on "Harborcoat"

Additional personnel

- Jacknife Lee – production
- Scott McCaughey – guitar, keyboards, harmonica on "Driver 8", background vocals
- Bill Rieflin – drums

== Chart positions ==
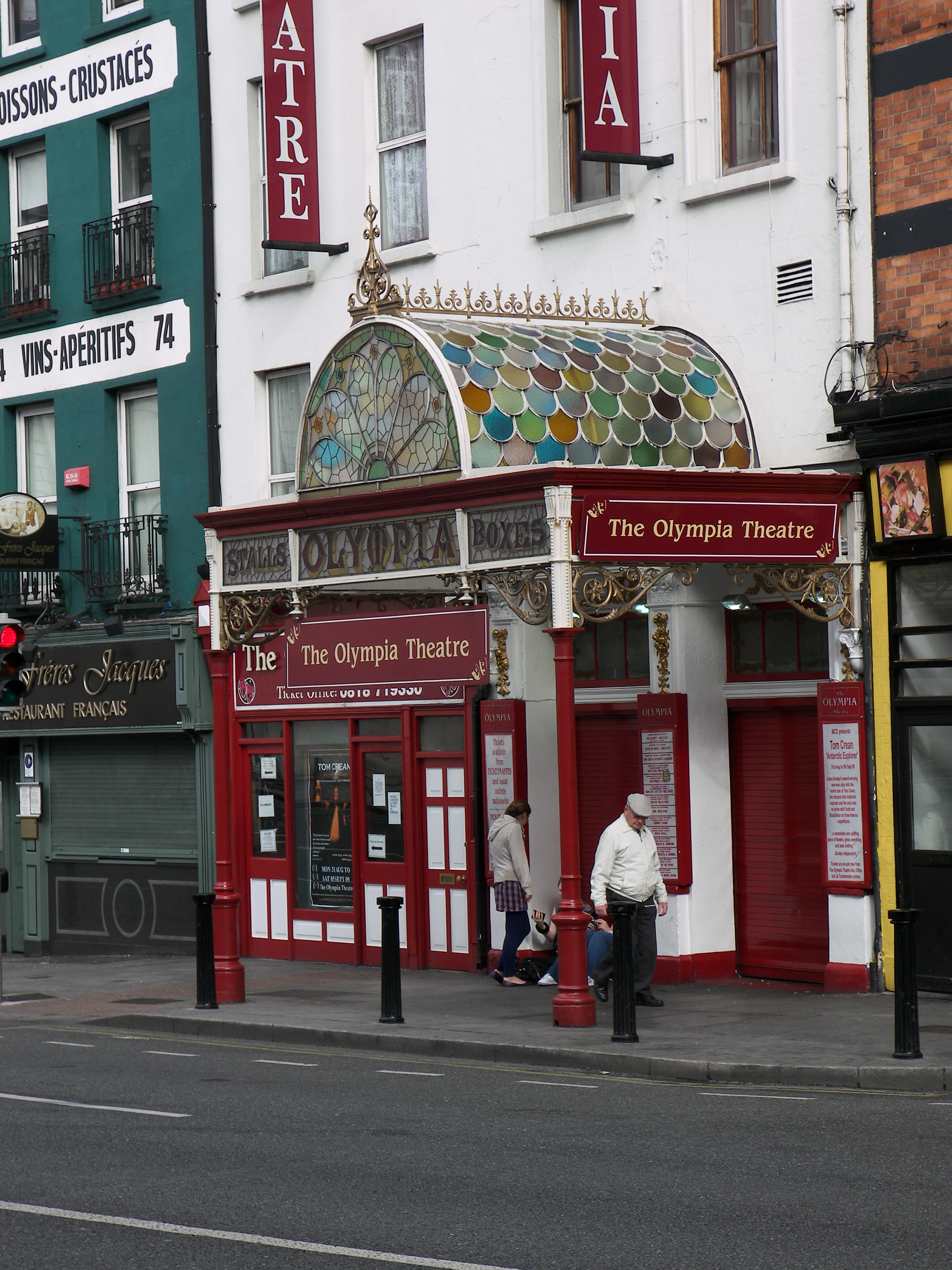
The Olympia hosted R.E.M. for their live rehearsals

Chart positions for Live at the Olympia
| Chart (2009) | Peak |
|---|---|
| Austrian Albums (Ö3 Austria) | 43 |
| Belgian Albums (Ultratop Flanders) | 40 |
| Belgian Albums (Ultratop Flanders Alternative) | 17 |
| Belgian Albums (Ultratop Wallonia) | 72 |
| Dutch Albums (Album Top 100) | 59 |
| French Albums (SNEP) | 157 |
| German Albums (Offizielle Top 100) | 53 |
| Italian Albums (FIMI) | 25 |
| Scottish Albums (OCC) | 60 |
| Spanish Albums (Promusicae) | 58 |
| Swiss Albums (Schweizer Hitparade) | 80 |
| UK Albums (OCC) | 68 |
| US Billboard 200 | 95 |
| US Modern Rock/Alternative Albums (Billboard) | 24 |
| US Rock Albums (Billboard) | 39 |
