= Complete Rarities: I.R.S. 1982–1987 =

Compilation album by R.E.M.
- Released: May 19, 2014
- Recorded: 1981–1987
- Genre: Alternative rock
- Length: 165:29
- Label: Capitol
- Producers: Joe Boyd, Don Dixon, Mitch Easter, Don Gehman, Scott Litt

R.E.M. chronology
Unplugged: The Complete 1991 and 2001 Sessions (2014)	Complete Rarities: I.R.S. 1982–1987 (2014)	Complete Rarities: Warner Bros. 1988–2011 (2014)

Complete Rarities: I.R.S. 1982–1987 is a 2014 compilation album featuring songs released by alternative rock band R.E.M. during their time on I.R.S. Records. In addition to the band's I.R.S. material, this album also features the tracks from the band's first single, which was released in July 1981 on the Hib-Tone label.

There was no CD release. The songs are digital download only.

== Track listing ==
All tracks are written by Bill Berry, Peter Buck, Mike Mills, and Michael Stipe, except where noted.

Complete Rarities: I.R.S. 1982–1987 track listing
No.	Title	Writer(s)	Original release	Length
1.	"Radio Free Europe" (Hib-tone single)		single (1981)	3:48
2.	"Sitting Still" (Hib-tone single)		B-side to "Radio Free Europe" (1981)	3:16
3.	"White Tornado" (live in studio)		Reckoning (The I.R.S. Years reissue) (1993)	1:56
4.	"Gardening at Night" (different vocal mix)		Eponymous (1988)	3:30
5.	"Gardening at Night" (acoustic)		Dead Letter Office (The I.R.S. Years reissue) (1993)	3:54
6.	"All the Right Friends" (studio outtake)		Dead Letter Office (The I.R.S. Years reissue)	3:54
7.	"Moon River"	Henry Mancini, Johnny Mercer	Reckoning (The I.R.S. Years reissue)	2:21
8.	"Pretty Persuasion" (live in studio)		Reckoning (The I.R.S. Years reissue)	4:02
9.	"There She Goes Again"	Lou Reed	B-side to "Radio Free Europe" (1983)	2:49
10.	"Tighten Up"	Archie Bell; Billy Buttier	Reckoning (The I.R.S. Years reissue)	4:09
11.	"Ages of You" (live at the Paradise Theater, Boston, Massachusetts, July 13, 1983)		Live! For Live (1986)	3:48
12.	"We Walk" (live at the Paradise Teater, Boston, Massachusetts, July 13, 1983)		And I Feel Fine... The Best of the I.R.S. Years 1982–1987 (2006)	3:17
13.	"1,000,000" (live at the Paradise Teater, Boston, Massachusetts, July 13, 1983)		And I Feel Fine... The Best of the I.R.S. Years 1982-1987	3:26
14.	"Gardening at Night" (electric demo)		And I Feel Fine... The Best of the I.R.S. Years 1982-1987	4:44
15.	"Just a Touch" (live in studio)		R.E.M. In the Attic – Alternative Recordings 1985–1989 (1997)	2:38
16.	"King of the Road"	Roger Miller	B-side to "So. Central Rain (I'm Sorry)" (1984)	3:14
17.	"Pale Blue Eyes"	Reed	B-side to "So. Central Rain (I'm Sorry)" 12-inch	2:54
18.	"Voice of Harold"		B-side to "So. Central Rain (I'm Sorry)" 12-inch	4:25
19.	"Walter's Theme"		B-side to "So. Central Rain (I'm Sorry)"	1:32
20.	"White Tornado"		B-side to "Superman" (1986)	1:52
21.	"Windout"	Berry; Buck; Mills; Stipe; Jerry Ayers	Bachelor Party: Original Soundtrack (1984)	1:58
22.	"Wind Out" (with friends)	Berry; Buck; Mills; Stipe; Ayers	Reckoning (The I.R.S. Years reissue)	2:00
23.	"9-9" (live at the Theater El Dorado, Paris, France, April 20, 1984)		B-side to "(Don't Go Back to) Rockville" 12-inch (1984)	3:06
24.	"Gardening at Night" (live at the Theater El Dorado, Paris, France, April 20, 1984)		B-side to "(Don't Go Back to) Rockville" 12-inch	3:48
25.	"Catapult" (live at the Music Hall, Seattle, Washington, June 27, 1984)		B-side to "(Don't Go Back to) Rockville"	4:03
26.	"Ages of You"		"Wendell Gee" double pack single (1985)	3:43
27.	"Bandwagon"	Berry; Buck; Mills; Stipe; Lynda Stipe	B-side to "Cant Get There from Here" (1985)	2:17
28.	"Burning Down"		"Wendell Gee" double pack single	4:12
29.	"Burning Hell"		B-side to "Cant Get There from Here" 12-inch	3:49
30.	"Crazy"	Randy Bewley; Vanessa Briscoe; Curtis Crowe; Michael Lachowski	B-side to "Driver 8" (1985)	3:03
31.	"Driver 8" (live at the Music Hall, Seattle, Washington; June 27, 1984)		B-side to "Wendell Gee" 12-inch	3:3
32.	"Bad Day" (studio outtake)		And I Feel Fine... The Best of the I.R.S. Years 1982–1987	3:03
33.	"Femme Fatale"	Reed	B-side to "Superman" 12-inch	2:50
34.	"Hyena" (demo)		And I Feel Fine... The Best of the I.R.S. Years 1982–1987	2:49
35.	"Mystery to Me" (demo)		And I Feel Fine... The Best of the I.R.S. Years 1982–1987	2:01
36.	"Rotary Ten"		B-side to "Fall on Me" (1986)	2:01
37.	"Theme from Two Steps Onward" (demo)		And I Feel Fine... The Best of the I.R.S. Years 1982–1987	4:37
38.	"Tired of Singing Trouble"		R.E.M. In the Attic – Alternative Recordings 1985–1989	0:59
39.	"Toys in the Attic"	Steven Tyler; Joe Perry	B-side to "Fall on Me" 12-inch	2:28
40.	"Romance"		Made in Heaven: Original Motion Picture Soundtrack (1987)	3:27
41.	"Last Date"	Floyd Cramer	B-side to "The One I Love" 12-inch (1987)	2:16
42.	"Finest Worksong" (Lengthy Club mix)		B-side to "Finest Worksong" 12-inch (1988)	5:52
43.	"Finest Worksong" (Mutual Drum Horn mix)		single (1988)	3:51
44.	"Finest Worksong" (other mix)		B-side to "Finest Worksong" 12-inch	3:46
45.	"Maps and Legends" (live at McCabe's Guitar Shop, Santa Monica, California, May 24, 1987)		B-side to "The One I Love"	3:16
46.	"Disturbance at the Heron House" (live at McCabe's Guitar Shop, Santa Monica, California, May 24, 1987)		B-side to "The One I Love" 12-inch	3:26
47.	"The One I Love" (live at McCabe's Guitar Shop, Santa Monica, California, May 24, 1987)		B-side to "It's the End of the World as We Know It (And I Feel Fine)" 12-inch (1987)	4:06
48.	"Swan Swan H" (acoustic)		Athens, GA: Inside/Out (1986)	2:42
49.	"(All I Have to Do Is) Dream"	Felice and Boudleaux Bryant	Athens, GA: Inside/Out	2:38
50.	"Time After Time, Etc." (live at the Muziekcentrum Vredenburg, Utrecht, Netherlands, September 14, 1987)	Berry; Buck; Mills; Stipe; Peter Gabriel	B-side to "Finest Worksong" 12-inch	8:22
