= Pretty Persuasion (song) =

Song by R.E.M

- Label to 12" promotional single, backed by "(Don't Go Back To) Rockville"

Promotional single by R.E.M.

from the album Reckoning
- Released: April 9, 1984
- Recorded: December 1983 – January 1984
- Studio: Reflection Sound (Charlotte, North Carolina)
- Genre: Punk rock; folk rock
- Length: 3:50
- Label: I.R.S.
- Songwriters: Bill Berry; Peter Buck; Mike Mills; Michael Stipe
- Producers: Mitch Easter; Don Dixon

"Pretty Persuasion" is a song by R.E.M. that was first released on the band's 1984 album Reckoning. It was released as a promotional single and reached number 44 on Billboard's Rock Tracks chart. According to R.E.M. biographer Tony Fletcher, it is often regarded as "the 'archetypal' R.E.M. anthem".

== Background ==
Although not released commercially until 1984, R.E.M. performed "Pretty Persuasion" live in concert as early as 1980 and 1981. A live version of the song was recorded for the band's 1983 debut album Murmur but was not released on that album, although the recording was eventually included as a bonus track on a 1992 release of Reckoning. Producer Mitch Easter wanted to record the song again for Reckoning but the band, particularly lead singer Michael Stipe who no longer liked the song, was initially reluctant. They eventually agreed to a multi-track studio recording for Reckoning due to the popularity of the song live with fans.

== Content ==
=== Lyrical themes ===
AllMusic critic Bill Janovitz describes the lyrics as "an anti-consumerism take on advertising." During an interview on The Late Show with Stephen Colbert in 2026, Stipe stated that the song was about "what we would now call trans rights".

=== Style and composition ===
As with many R.E.M. songs, the refrain, "He's got pretty persuasion/She's got pretty persuasion/God damn your confusion" is, as described by Fletcher, concise and repetitive. R.E.M. guitarist Peter Buck has stated that the song was originally inspired by a dream Stipe had. In the dream, Stipe was photographing the Rolling Stones for the cover of a single entitled "Pretty Persuasion".

The song begins with a guitar riff based on descending arpeggios. Easter notes a musical similarity to Todd Rundgren's 1972 song "Couldn't I Just Tell You", which he speculates inspired "Pretty Persuasion". Janovitz notes similarities with songs by the Byrds, including the Rickenbacker guitar riffs and the harmony vocals of Stipe and bassist Mike Mills. However, the vocals on "Pretty Persuasion" are not precisely enunciated, making the lyrics difficult to decipher at times. Spin critics Eric Weisbard and Craig Marks described "Pretty Persuasion" as "a great rocker."

== Performances ==
In addition to being played live in the early portion of R.E.M.'s career, "Pretty Persuasion" was included in the band's live set as late as 2008. Fletcher regards it as one of the songs that informed R.E.M.'s 2008 album Accelerate. A live version from this tour was released on the 2009 live album Live at the Olympia. "Pretty Persuasion" has also been included on several of R.E.M.'s compilation albums, including The Best of R.E.M. in 1991 and And I Feel Fine... The Best of the I.R.S. Years 1982–1987 in 2006.

The band briefly reunited on February 27, 2025, at the 40 Watt Club in their hometown of Athens, Georgia, to perform the song alongside Jason Narducy, Michael Shannon, and others. Stipe also joined Shannon and Narducy in a performance of the song on March 8 in Brooklyn.

== Music video ==
This song, and others from the album, is part of a short film called "Left of Reckoning", directed by James Herbert. The four-minute clip has the band wandering around folk artist R.A. Miller's Whirligig Farm in Rabbittown, Georgia.

== Personnel ==
Sources:

- Bill Berry – drums
- Peter Buck – guitars
- Mike Mills – bass guitar, backing vocals
- Michael Stipe – lead vocals
