= Howard Libov =

American film director

Howard Libov is an American director of music videos and films. He is director of film production for the bachelor of arts program at Fairleigh Dickinson University in Madison, New Jersey.

He has produced documentaries for CNN.

== Early life ==
Libov graduated with a master's degrees in communication and education from Georgia State University in Atlanta, Georgia, followed by a Bachelor of Fine Arts in film from New York University Tisch School of the Arts. He also attained a certificate in film directing from the American Film Institute.

== Career ==
In 1984, he directed the video to R.E.M.'s single "So. Central Rain (I'm Sorry)", recorded at Reflection Studio in Charlotte, North Carolina. The same year, he directed the video to Love Tractor's single "Spin Your Partner".

Libov co-wrote and directed "Favorite Son" (2009) with Pablo Schreiber, who played David Paxton in the film. R.E.M.'s Mike Mills wrote and recorded his song "Gift of the Fathers" for the film. The duo previously worked together in 1991 on Libov's film Men Will Be Boys.

He also directed and co-wrote Midnight Edition (1994) with Will Patton and directed the award-winning documentaries Aglow and Fourteen Stations.
