= Accelerate (R.E.M. album) =

2008 album by R.E.M.

Studio album by R.E.M.
- Released: March 31, 2008
- Recorded: June and July 2007
- Studios: Armoury (Vancouver); Grouse Lodge (Rosemount); Seney-Stonewall Chapel (Athens, Georgia); Olympia Theatre (Dublin); Mike Mills' home (Athens, Georgia)
- Genres: Hard rock; punk rock; glam rock; jangle pop
- Length: 34:39
- Label: Warner Bros.
- Producers: Jacknife Lee; R.E.M.

R.E.M. chronology
R.E.M. Live (2007)	Accelerate (2008)	Live from London (2008)

Singles from Accelerate
- 1. "Supernatural Superserious" Released: February 25, 2008; 2. "Hollow Man" Released: June 2, 2008; 3. "Man-Sized Wreath" Released: August 11, 2008; 4. "Until the Day Is Done" Released: November 14, 2008

Accelerate is the fourteenth studio album by American alternative rock band R.E.M., released on March 31, 2008, in Europe, and on April 1 in North America. Produced with Jacknife Lee, Accelerate was intended as a departure from the 2004 album Around the Sun. R.E.M. previewed most of the album's tracks during a five-night residency at the Olympia Theatre in Dublin, Ireland, and recorded the album in a nine-week schedule.

The album was heralded as a return to form for the band, receiving a warm reception from music critics and achieving a 79/100 rating on Metacritic. Reviewers often complimented the aggressive, purposeful sound of the songs, with Q magazine critic Keith Cameron stating that "Accelerate is the sound of a band having enjoyed a good word with themselves—and us." It was their last album to be accompanied by a tour, as the band had decided against touring for their next (and final) album Collapse into Now before disbanding.

== Background and recording ==
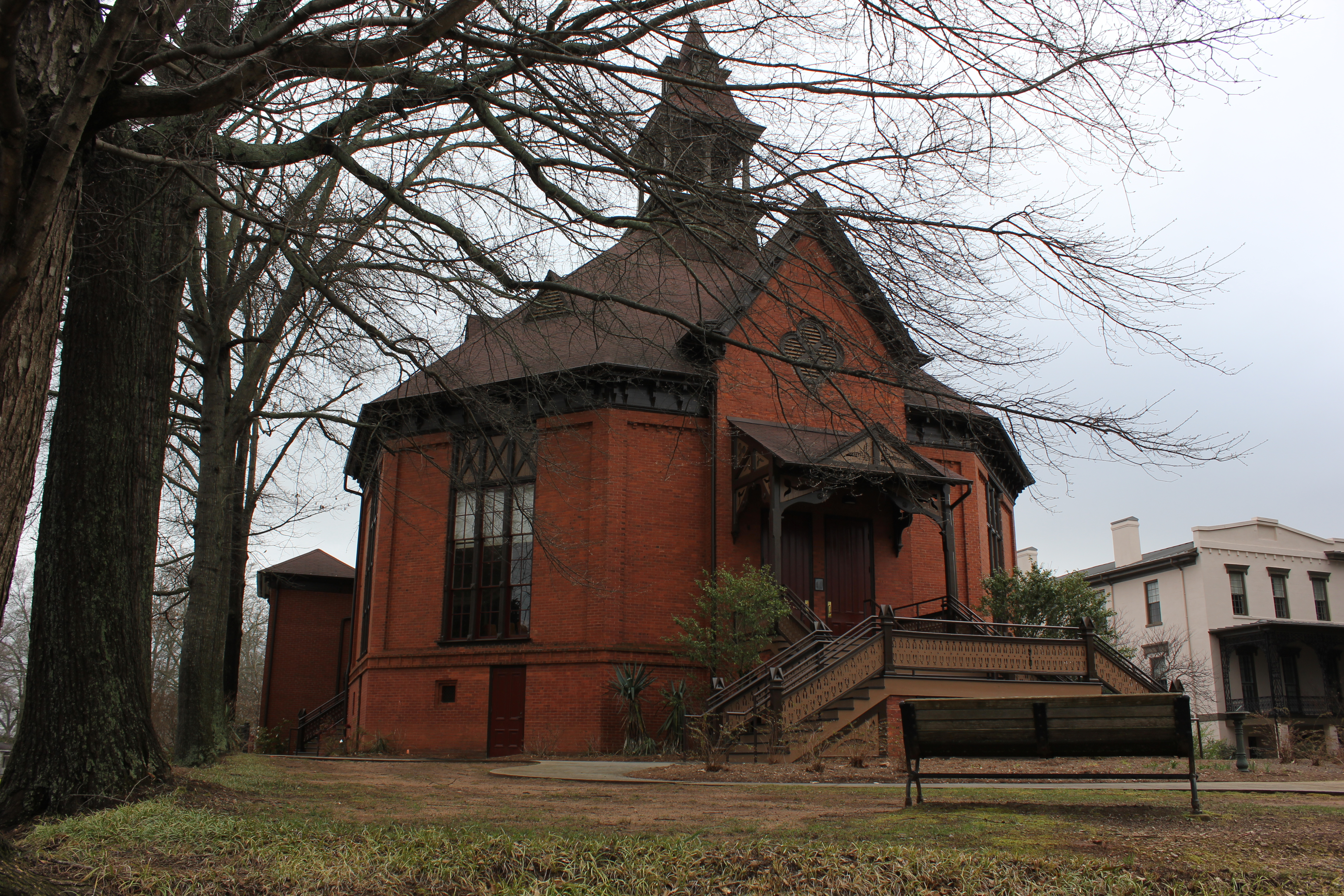
Seney–Stovall Chapel, in the band's hometown of Athens, Georgia, was one of the recording locations for Accelerate and was also where they recorded two songs for the film Athens, GA: Inside/Out in 1986.

R.E.M.'s previous record Around the Sun (2004) only sold 240,000 copies in the United States and was poorly received by critics. The band members later expressed displeasure with the album. Guitarist Peter Buck told Q, "I personally hated it. [Quickly] No, hated is too hard. I hated the fact that it wasn't as good as it should've been." Buck admitted the band felt pressure to subsequently make a better record; he told Q, "Even Michael [Stipe] was going, 'Y'know, if we make another bad record, it's over.' It's like, 'No kidding.'"

Buck and bassist Mike Mills began working on instrumental demos in winter 2007, assisted by touring members Bill Rieflin and Scott McCaughey. The music they wrote was faster and more aggressive than other material they had written in years. Mills suggested the band work out its new songs in a live setting before recording them, as it had done in its early years. Between June 30 and July 5, 2007, R.E.M. played a five-night series of shows at the Olympia Theatre, Dublin, Ireland. In this series of shows—dubbed "working rehearsals" by the band, many songs on Accelerate were debuted, with many of them still as works in progress. These performances would later be released as Live at The Olympia in 2009.

At the urging of The Edge of U2, R.E.M. chose to record the album with producer Jacknife Lee. Following the Olympia Theatre residency, R.E.M. scheduled three-week recording sessions in three different cities in order to keep its focus. The tight recording schedule prevented Stipe from spending too much time working on his lyrics and vocal parts. Stipe told Spin, "I work really well under pressure, and the guys know that all too well... So the pace forced me to kind of spit stuff out." The group mixed the album in a London studio in 10 days. Regarding the recording process, Stipe said, "We spent less time making this record than we have in 20 years."

== Music ==
The members of R.E.M. were reluctant to pin down the style of the new album so as not to create wayward expectations. The new material featured in the Dublin concerts demonstrated a much more stripped-down, guitar-driven sound than had been featured on the band's recent releases, and Mike Mills indicated that the shows gave a good indication of the band's direction. Stipe said his lyrics on Accelerate were inspired by the contemporary state of the nation, saying, "When the empire is going down the toilet, it's easy to write great, angry songs."

Described in sound as "ballyhooed hard rock", Sputnikmusic proclaimed Accelerate "a ballsier return to [the band's] punk roots".

== Promotion ==
On January 1, 2008, R.E.M. launched the website NinetyNights.com, on which a new short clip from Accelerate was posted daily until the album's release. In February, R.E.M. launched the website supernaturalsuperserious.com with eleven videos to promote the album. A week later, R.E.M. launched remaccelerate.com, a web page for promoting and aggregating news about the album itself.

In late March 2008, the band released Accelerate as a digital web streams on iLike six days prior to the American release of its physical album in April. Michael Stipe said R.E.M. wanted to experiment with its distribution system, citing the change in the music industry since the release of Around the Sun. A deluxe edition of the album was released in addition to the standard edition; it includes a DVD featuring filmmaker Vincent Moon's film 6 Days, which includes behind-the-scenes footage and performances of various songs on the album. Two B-side tracks, "Red Head Walking" and "Airliner," are included as bonus tracks, along with a 64-page booklet. The vinyl version consists of two 12 inch discs each running at 45 RPM, and contains the full album on CD.

A brief tour, the last of the group's tenure, took place in 2008. It covered Europe, North America, and Latin America.

== Release and reception ==
Professional ratings
Aggregate scores
Source	Rating
Metacritic	79/100
Review scores
Source	Rating
AllMusic	4/5 stars
The A.V. Club	B+
Entertainment Weekly	A−
The Guardian	4/5 stars
Mojo	4/5 stars
NME	8/10
Pitchfork	6.7/10
Q	4/5 stars
Rolling Stone	4/5 stars
Spin	4.5/5 stars

Accelerate was the band's highest-charting release since 1996's New Adventures in Hi-Fi. It debuted at number two on the Billboard 200 with first week sales of 115,000 copies, went on to sell more than 353,000 copies in the United States and became the band's eighth album to top the British album charts. "Supernatural Superserious" was released as the album's first single. The second single "Hollow Man" was released in June 2008, with "Man-Sized Wreath" following in August. According to Billboard, Accelerate stayed 18 weeks on the Billboard 200 chart. The vinyl LP edition was re-released in August 2023.

Accelerate received positive reviews from critics noted at review aggregator Metacritic. It has a weighted average score of 79 out of 100, based on 33 reviews. Rolling Stone gave the album four out of five stars, with critic David Fricke praising the group's aggressive sound, writing, "Stipe has not sounded this viscerally engaged in his singing and poetically lethal in his writing since the twilight of the Reagan administration." NME reviewer Alan Woodhouse, similarly applauding the group's return to its previous sound, gave Accelerate an eight out of 10 rating, concluding "Accelerate is by some considerable distance R.E.M.'s best and most cohesive album since [former drummer] Bill Berry left, and crucially echoes a time when they made their best music, if not necessarily their biggest-selling." Q reviewer Keith Cameron wrote that unlike Around the Sun, "Accelerate is the sound of a band having enjoyed a good word with themselves—and us." Cameron described the album's first three songs as "powerful as the first half of 1986's Lifes Rich Pageant," but commented that the album suffers through a "midway dip that afflicts even the best R.E.M. album."

Time reviewer Josh Tyrangiel praised guitarist Buck's "resurgence" and "propulsive riffs," but also wrote, "R.E.M.'s 14th album never quite generates the moody atmospherics of their first 10; it's a little hard to lose yourself in something that doesn't pause long enough for you to get lost." Uncut gave the album three out of five stars. Reviewer John Mulvey stated, "Accelerate is a simple, pragmatic record built on an uncomfortable truth: sometimes, even the best bands have to retrace their steps, if only to remind themselves what they're really good at."

=== Accolades ===
In 2009, Consequence of Sound ranked the album at number 37 in its list of the top 100 albums of the decade, and Under the Radar ranked it at number 193 in its list of the "Top 200 Albums of the 2000s". In 2010, the Kitsap Sun placed it at number 73 in its list of the "Top 101 Albums of the 2000s". It also appeared in at least 24 professional lists of the best albums of 2008.

== Track listing ==
All songs written by Peter Buck, Mike Mills and Michael Stipe.

1. "Living Well Is the Best Revenge" – 3:11
2. "Man-Sized Wreath" – 2:32
3. "Supernatural Superserious" – 3:23
4. "Hollow Man" – 2:39
5. "Houston" – 2:05
6. "Accelerate" – 3:33
7. "Until the Day Is Done" – 4:08
8. "Mr. Richards" – 3:46
9. "Sing for the Submarine" – 4:50
10. "Horse to Water" – 2:18
11. "I'm Gonna DJ" – 2:07

== Personnel ==
R.E.M.

- Peter Buck
- Mike Mills
- Michael Stipe

Additional musicians

- Scott McCaughey
- Bill Rieflin

Technical personnel

- Jacknife Lee – production, mixing
- R.E.M. – production
- Tom McFall – engineering
- Sam Bell – engineering, mixing engineer
- Bob Stefanson – assistant engineer (Armoury Studios)
- Jarrod Nestibo – second assistant (Armoury Studios)
- Dani Castelar – assistant engineer (Grouse Lodge)
- Owen Lewis – second assistant (Grouse Lodge)
- Simon Wall – assistant mixing engineer
- Bethina Beadman – second mixing assistant
- John Davis – mastering

== Charts ==
=== Weekly charts ===
Weekly chart performance for Accelerate
Chart (2008)	Peak position
Australian Albums (ARIA)	13
Austrian Albums (Ö3 Austria)	2
Belgian Albums (Ultratop Flanders)	1
Belgian Albums (Ultratop Wallonia)	13
Canadian Albums (Billboard)	1
Croatian International Albums (HDU)	1
Danish Albums (Hitlisten)	2
Dutch Albums (Album Top 100)	2
Finnish Albums (Suomen virallinen lista)	10
French Albums (SNEP)	17
German Albums (Offizielle Top 100)	2
Hungarian Albums (MAHASZ)	10
Irish Albums (IRMA)	1
Italian Albums (FIMI)	2
New Zealand Albums (RMNZ)	5
Norwegian Albums (VG-lista)	1
Portuguese Albums (AFP)	27
Spanish Albums (Promusicae)	7
Swedish Albums (Sverigetopplistan)	7
Swiss Albums (Schweizer Hitparade)	1
UK Albums (Official Charts)	1
US Billboard 200	2

=== Year-end charts ===
Chart (2008)	Position
Austrian Albums Chart	54
Belgian Albums Chart (Flanders)	43
Dutch Albums Chart	63
French Albums Chart	190
German Albums Chart	39
Swiss Albums Chart	34
UK Albums Chart	113
US Billboard 200	127

- A The album also entered the Billboard Digital Albums at No. 2, and topped the Digital Albums and Alternative Albums charts.

== Certifications and sales ==
Region	Certification	Certified units/sales
Austria (IFPI Austria)	Gold	10,000^{*}
Denmark (IFPI Danmark)	Gold	15,000
Germany (BVMI)	Gold	100,000^{^}
Ireland (IRMA)	Gold	7,500^{^}
Italy sales in 2008	—	70,000
Norway (IFPI Norway)	Platinum	30,000^{*}
Switzerland (IFPI Switzerland)	Platinum	30,000^{^}
United Kingdom (BPI)	Gold	100,000^{^}
^{*} Sales figures based on certification alone.^{^} Shipments figures based on certification alone.
