= Drive (R.E.M. song) =

1992 single by R.E.M.

- Blue version of the US CD artwork. Orange, yellow, and green versions also exist.

Single by R.E.M.

from the album Automatic for the People
- B-side: "Winged Mammal Theme"; "World Leader Pretend"
- Released: September 21, 1992
- Studio: Kingsway, New Orleans
- Length: 4:25
- Label: Warner Bros.
- Songwriters: Bill Berry; Peter Buck; Mike Mills; Michael Stipe
- Producers: Scott Litt; R.E.M.

R.E.M. singles chronology
| "It's the End of the World as We Know It (And I Feel Fine)" (1991) | "Drive" (1992) | "Man on the Moon" (1992) |

"Drive" is a song by American alternative rock band R.E.M. It is the first track on and the lead single from their eighth studio album, Automatic for the People (1992), and was the first song lead singer Michael Stipe wrote on a computer. "Drive" peaked at number 28 on the US Billboard Hot 100, number one on the Billboard Modern Rock Tracks chart, and number two on the Billboard Album Rock Tracks chart. Internationally, "Drive" became R.E.M.'s then-second-biggest hit on the UK Singles Chart, peaking at number 11, and their biggest hit in Norway until "Supernatural Superserious" in 2008, reaching number three. Elsewhere, the song reached the top 10 in Canada, Ireland, New Zealand, and Switzerland. The accompanying music video was directed by Peter Care and filmed in Los Angeles.

Despite the success and popularity of the song, it was left out of the band's Warner Bros. Records "best of" compilations In Time: The Best of R.E.M. 1988–2003 and Part Lies, Part Heart, Part Truth, Part Garbage 1982–2011; however, a live version of the song was included in the special edition two-disc set of In Time that included rarities, live versions, and B-sides. The version featured was the "funk" version, which has never been studio-recorded. The song is also included on the 2003 live DVD Perfect Square, the 2007 live CD/DVD R.E.M. Live, and the 2009 live CD Live at the Olympia (and its accompanying DVD This Is Not a Show). This song was also sampled in the song "Space Bound" by Eminem on his 2010 album Recovery.

The B-side, "Winged Mammal Theme", is a re-working of the "Batman Theme" originally intended to appear in Batman Returns; the song went unused in the film's final version.

== Inspirations ==
The title itself is derived from Stipe and R.E.M.'s support for what would eventually become the "Motor Voter Bill." The lyric "Hey, kids, rock 'n' roll" is an homage to the song "Stop It" by fellow Athens, Georgia, group Pylon; Stipe has also said the song is an "obvious homage to 'Rock On' by David Essex," which features a similar line.

"The arrangement of 'Drive' was, in part, inspired by Queen," reported Scott Litt. "Pete and Mike are big Queen fans. Queen records, for all their bombast, sounded like each player had a personality."

Mike Mills has said "'Drive' is just telling kids to take charge of their own lives. [Pause.] Among other things." To Peter Buck: "It's a subtle, political thing. Michael specifically mentions the term 'bush-whacked'. But if you want to take it like 'Stand', that's cool, too. You like to think that you can appreciate these songs on any level you want to. I have a lot of records I listen to when I'm just doing the dishes. Like Ride records. I really like Ride a lot. And I have no idea what the songs are about. And I really don't care. I don't even worry about it. Lyrics are the last thing I listen to, unless someone is hitting me over the head with it."

== Critical reception ==
David Stubbs from Melody Maker named "Drive" Single of the Week, writing, "'Drive' grows inside you. It's remarkably sombre for an opening salvo, the mood captured exactly by Stipe's photo on the cover sleeve — a lonely truck underneath a vast, brooding sky. Stipe's voice is treated here, shadowed by an echo effect which adds to the feeling of being lost on the road to nowhere." Parry Gettelman from Orlando Sentinel complimented it as the "best cut" on Automatic for the People, adding, "The eerie, sarcastic lyrics ("Maybe you rocked around the clock - tick ... tock ... tick ... tock") and a simple acoustic guitar riff that gradually rises into symphonic accompaniment give the song the intriguing menace of early Pink Floyd."

== Music video ==
The music video for "Drive", directed by English director Peter Care, was shot over two nights in late August 1992 at Sepulveda Dam in the Sherman Oaks area of Los Angeles. "I remember Oliver Stone came," Michael Stipe said in 2001. "I was trying to get a film produced with him at the time. And River Phoenix came – we were friends. And Oliver had been drinking and they got into a fight in my trailer. It was fun to watch. And it kind of fuelled the energy that this video, from beginning to end, kind of carries through it."

Actor Adam Scott appeared as an extra in the video.

== Track listings ==
All songs were written by Bill Berry, Peter Buck, Mike Mills, and Michael Stipe except where noted.

- US 7-inch, cassette, and CD single
1. "Drive" – 4:25
2. "Winged Mammal Theme" – 2:57
- UK CD1
1. "Drive" – 4:25
2. "World Leader Pretend" – 4:15
3. "First We Take Manhattan" (Leonard Cohen) – 6:06
- UK CD2
1. "Drive" – 4:25
2. "It's a Free World, Baby" – 5:11
3. "Winged Mammal Theme" – 2:55
4. "First We Take Manhattan" (Cohen) – 6:06
- UK 7-inch and cassette single
1. "Drive" – 4:25
2. "World Leader Pretend" – 4:15

== Personnel ==
R.E.M.

- Bill Berry – drums, percussion
- Peter Buck – acoustic guitar, electric guitar
- Mike Mills – bass guitar, accordion
- Michael Stipe – vocals

Strings

- John Paul Jones – orchestral arrangements
- George Hanson – conductor
- Denise Berginson-Smith, Lonnie Ottzen, Patti Gouvas, Sandy Salzinger, Sou-Chun Su, Jody Taylor – violin
- Kathleen Kee, Daniel Laufer, Elizabeth Proctor Murphy – cello
- Reid Harris, Paul Murphy, Heidi Nitchie – viola

Production

- Scott Litt – producer, mixing engineer
- Clif Norrell – recording engineer, mixing engineer
- Mark Howard – second engineer
- Stephen Marcussen – mastering engineer (Precision Mastering)

== Charts ==
=== Weekly charts ===
| Chart (1992–1993) | Peak position |
|---|---|
| Australia (ARIA) | 34 |
| Austria (Ö3 Austria Top 40) | 11 |
| Belgium (Ultratop 50 Flanders) | 13 |
| Canada Top Singles (RPM) | 7 |
| Europe (Eurochart Hot 100) | 20 |
| Europe (European Hit Radio) | 2 |
| Finland (Suomen virallinen lista) | 11 |
| Germany (GfK) | 13 |
| Greece (Pop + Rock) | 4 |
| Ireland (IRMA) | 4 |
| Netherlands (Dutch Top 40) | 15 |
| Netherlands (Single Top 100) | 13 |
| New Zealand (Recorded Music NZ) | 5 |
| Norway (VG-lista) | 3 |
| Portugal (AFP) | 10 |
| Sweden (Sverigetopplistan) | 24 |
| Switzerland (Schweizer Hitparade) | 7 |
| UK Singles (Official Charts) | 11 |
| UK Airplay (Music Week) | 7 |
| US Billboard Hot 100 | 28 |
| US Alternative Airplay (Billboard) | 1 |
| US Mainstream Rock (Billboard) | 2 |
| US Pop Airplay (Billboard) | 23 |
| US Cash Box Top 100 | 23 |

=== Year-end charts ===
| Chart (1992) | Position |
|---|---|
| Canada Top Singles (RPM) | 52 |
| Europe (European Hit Radio) | 36 |

| Chart (1993) | Position |
|---|---|
| Canada Top Singles (RPM) | 95 |

== Release history ==
| Region | Date | Format(s) | Label(s) | Ref. |
|---|---|---|---|---|
| United States | September 17, 1992 | Alternative; album rock radio | Warner Bros. | |
| United Kingdom | September 21, 1992 | 7-inch vinyl; CD; cassette | Warner Bros. | |
| Japan | September 25, 1992 | Mini-CD | Warner Bros. | |
| Australia | October 5, 1992 | CD; cassette | Warner Bros. | |
| United States | October 8, 1992 | Top 40 radio | Warner Bros. | |
