= Until the Day Is Done =

Song by R.E.M

Single by R.E.M.

from the album Accelerate
- B-side: "Houston" (Live)
- Released: 2008
- Recorded: 2007
- Genre: Alternative rock
- Length: 4:08
- Label: Warner Bros.
- Songwriters: Peter Buck; Mike Mills; Michael Stipe
- Producers: Jacknife Lee; R.E.M.

R.E.M. singles chronology
| "Man-Sized Wreath" (2008) | "Until the Day Is Done" (2008) | "It Happened Today" (2010) |

"Until the Day Is Done" is a song by American rock band R.E.M. from their fourteenth studio album Accelerate. It was debuted on Anderson Cooper 360° to promote the Planet in Peril special and was released as a single on November 14, 2008, as a two-track download-only single. The promotional music video, directed by Vincent Moon, was posted on the band's website and on the band's YouTube account in late October 2008 and features footage from the live video album Live at The Olympia.

The song evolved from an instrumental demo titled "Black Sky 4-14", recorded during the sessions for the band's 1994's album Monster and released with its 25th anniversary edition in 2019.

== Track listing ==
1. "Until the Day Is Done" – 4:09
2. "Houston" (Live at the Apple Store, Regent Street, London, March 26, 2008) – 2:19

== Charts ==
| Chart (2008) | Peak position |
|---|---|
| Switzerland (Schweizer Hitparade) | 49 |
