= The One I Love (R.E.M. song) =

1987 single by R.E.M.

Single by R.E.M.

from the album Document
- B-side: "Maps and Legends" (Live)
- Released: August 24, 1987
- Recorded: April 1987
- Studio: Sound Emporium (Nashville, Tennessee)
- Genre: Alternative rock; new wave
- Length: 3:17
- Label: I.R.S.
- Songwriters: Bill Berry; Peter Buck; Mike Mills; Michael Stipe
- Producers: Scott Litt; R.E.M.

R.E.M. singles chronology
| "Superman" (1986) | "The One I Love" (1987) | "It's the End of the World as We Know It (And I Feel Fine)" (1987) |

Music video
- "The One I Love" on YouTube

"The One I Love" is a song by American alternative rock band R.E.M. It was released on the band's fifth full-length studio album, Document (1987), and also as a 7" vinyl single in 1987 by I.R.S. Records. The song was their first hit single, reaching No. 9 on the US Billboard Hot 100, No. 14 in Canada, and later reached No. 16 on the UK Singles Chart in its 1991 re-release.

The accompanying video's director was artist Robert Longo. The director of photography was Alton Brown.

In March 2005, Q magazine placed "The One I Love" at No. 57 in its list of the 100 Greatest Guitar Tracks. In 2012, Slant Magazine listed the song as the 38th best single of the 1980s.

The song is included on R.E.M. Live (2007). It was also included in Activision's Guitar Hero World Tour and Guitar Hero on Tour: Decades, both in 2008, as well as Harmonix's Rock Band 4 (2015).

== Lyrics and meaning ==
The record has become a popular radio dedication to loved ones, relying on a misinterpretation of its refrain, "This one goes out to the one I love." However, subsequent lyrics in the same verse contradict the love song interpretation and suggest a darker, more manipulative theme ("A simple prop to occupy my time").

Michael Stipe related in 1987 to Rolling Stone, "I've always left myself pretty open to interpretation. It's probably better that they just think it's a love song at this point." However, in an interview in the January 1988 issue of Musician magazine, he said that the song was "incredibly violent" and added, "It's very clear that it's about using people over and over again."

The song contains only three verses, the first two of which are identical; the third verse changes the line "A simple prop to occupy my time" to "Another prop has occupied my time." The chorus consists of just the word "fire", repeated over the backing vocal of "She's coming down on her own now / Coming down on her own" (sung by Mike Mills).

== Track listings ==
All songs written by Bill Berry, Peter Buck, Mike Mills and Michael Stipe unless otherwise indicated.

1. "The One I Love" – 3:16
2. "Maps and Legends" (live)^{1} – 3:15

=== 12": IRS / IRS-23792 (US) ===
Side one

1. "The One I Love" – 3:16

Side two

1. "The One I Love" (live)^{1} – 4:06
2. "Maps and Legends" (live)^{1} – 3:15

=== 12": IRS / IRMT 146 (UK) ===
Side one

1. "The One I Love" – 3:16

Side two

1. "Last Date" (Floyd Cramer) – 2:16
2. "Disturbance at the Heron House"^{1} – 3:26

=== 1987 CD: IRS / DIRM 146 (UK) ===
1. "The One I Love" – 3:16
2. "Last Date" (Floyd Cramer) – 2:16
3. "Disturbance at the Heron House"^{1} – 3:26

=== 1988 CD: IRS / DIRM 173 (UK) ===
1. "The One I Love" – 3:16
2. "Fall on Me" – 2:50
3. "So. Central Rain" – 3:14

=== 1991 Limited Edition CD: IRS / DIRMT 178 (UK) ===
1. "The One I Love" – 3:16
2. "This One Goes Out" (live) – 4:01
3. "Maps and Legends" (live) – 3:13

=== 1991 Limited Edition CD: IRS / DIRMX 178 (UK) ===
1. "The One I Love" – 3:15
2. "Driver Eight" (live) – 3:27
3. "Disturbance at the Heron House" (live) – 3:40
4. "Crazy" – 3:02

^{1} Recorded at McCabe's Guitar Shop, Santa Monica, California, May 24, 1987.

Certain releases list the live recording of "The One I Love" as "This One Goes Out" instead.

== Charts ==
| Chart (1987–1988) | Peak position |
|---|---|
| Australia (Kent Music Report) | 84 |
| Canada Top Singles (RPM) | 11 |
| Netherlands (Single Top 100) | 69 |
| New Zealand (Recorded Music NZ) | 6 |
| South Africa (Springbok) | 17 |
| UK Singles (Official Charts) | 51 |
| US Billboard Hot 100 | 9 |
| US Mainstream Rock Tracks (Billboard) | 2 |
| US Cash Box Top 100 | 10 |

| Chart (1991) | Peak position |
|---|---|
| Europe (European Hit Radio) | 33 |
| Germany (GfK) | 81 |
| Ireland (IRMA) | 5 |
| Luxembourg (Radio Luxembourg) | 4 |
| Netherlands (Dutch Top 40 Tipparade) | 13 |
| Netherlands (Single Top 100) | 72 |
| UK Singles (Official Charts) | 16 |
| UK Airplay (Music Week) | 10 |

== Certifications ==
| Region | Certification | Certified units/sales |
|---|---|---|
| New Zealand (RMNZ) | Gold | 15,000^{‡} |
| United Kingdom (BPI) | Silver | 200,000^{‡} |
^{‡} Sales+streaming figures based on certification alone.
