= Hollow Man (song) =

2008 single by R.E.M.

Single by R.E.M.

from the album Accelerate
- B-side: "Horse to Water" (Live); "Indian Summer"
- Released: June 2, 2008
- Recorded: 2007
- Genre: Alternative rock; power pop
- Length: 2:39
- Label: Warner Bros.
- Songwriter(s): Peter Buck; Mike Mills; Michael Stipe
- Producer(s): Jacknife Lee; R.E.M.

R.E.M. singles chronology
"Supernatural Superserious" (2008)	"Hollow Man" (2008)	"Man-Sized Wreath" (2008)

"Hollow Man" is the fourth track and second single from R.E.M.'s fourteenth album Accelerate. The music video was created by Crush Inc., a graphic-design and production studio based in Toronto, and posted on the band's website on April 23, 2008. The single was released in the UK on June 2, 2008. The song peaked at number 7 on Billboard magazine's Triple A chart.

== Track listing ==
CD single (UK, W804CD1)

1. "Hollow Man" – 2:42
2. "Horse to Water" (Live in Vancouver) – 2:38

The CD cover shows a typical Nokia mobile phone interface.

=== Canceled release ===
- This three-track single was scheduled as a CD single in Germany but was subsequently canceled. The B-side "Indian Summer" is however available through download stores. Some three-track copies of the CD single were released as promotional copies.
1. "Hollow Man" – 2:42
2. "Horse to Water" (Live in Vancouver) – 2:38
3. "Indian Summer" – 5:01

== Personnel ==
- "Hollow Man" and "Horse to Water" written by Peter Buck, Mike Mills and Michael Stipe.
- "Indian Summer" written by Calvin Johnson (Beat Happening cover, from their album Jamboree, 1988).

== Music video ==
The music video for the song features a four-frame animated figure overlaid on top of the footage. At Hollowman.tv, the band have encouraged fans to print off copies of the character and photograph it themselves to insert on the video projected behind their live performances of the song.

== Charts ==
Chart (2008)	Peak position
Belgium (Ultratip Bubbling Under Flanders)	11
UK Singles (Official Charts Company)	200
US Adult Alternative Songs (Billboard)	7
