= Supernatural Superserious =

2008 single by R.E.M.

Single by R.E.M.

from the album Accelerate
- B-side: "Airliner"; "Red Head Walking"
- Released: February 11, 2008
- Recorded: 2007
- Genre: Rock; garage rock
- Length: 3:25
- Label: Warner Bros.
- Songwriters: Peter Buck; Mike Mills; Michael Stipe
- Producers: Jacknife Lee; R.E.M.

R.E.M. singles chronology
"#9 Dream" (2007)	"Supernatural Superserious" (2008)	"Hollow Man" (2008)

"Supernatural Superserious" is a song by American alternative rock band R.E.M. It is the first single and third track from the band's fourteenth album Accelerate and premiered on now defunct New York City radio station WRXP on February 5, 2008, without the consent of Warner Bros. Records. The single was first released on February 11, 2008 as an MP3, and February 25, 2008 on CD. Michael Stipe considers the song to be "one of the best things we've ever wrote."

Like most of the songs on Accelerate, it made its debut during the band's "working rehearsals" at the Olympia Theatre in Dublin between June 30 and July 5, 2007, in an unfinished form with the name "Disguised"; the song appears on Live at The Olympia in this form. Its title was changed on the advice of Coldplay frontman Chris Martin.

The song itself proved an early success, entering the UK Singles Chart at number 54 on downloads, before its official physical release, although—unlike most of R.E.M.'s lead singles in the UK—it was not a hit there. It also became R.E.M.'s first song since 2001's "Imitation of Life" to enter more than two charts and to chart on the Billboard Modern Rock Tracks, with an entry position of number 36, eventually reaching 21. The other chart that the song charted was the Billboard Hot 100 where it reached number 85. It is also the band's final appearance on the Hot 100 chart. The song reached number one in Norway, becoming the band's only chart-topper there, and also reached the top 30 in several other European countries, including Belgium, Italy, and Sweden.

A special 7" single was released to commemorate Record Store Day on April 19, 2008, in the US. The single was made available exclusively for participating stores along with special releases from Björk and Death Cab for Cutie.

== Music video ==
The music video was shot by director Vincent Moon in various locations around New York City. On February 12, 2008 the website supernaturalsuperserious.com (no longer available) was launched, containing ten takes of the video available for download in high definition as well as a YouTube page for users to upload their own versions of the video.

== In popular culture ==
The song was used by ESPN as part of their coverage of Major League Baseball's 2008 Opening Day. It was used in the 2009 film He's Just Not That Into You, and plays over the end credits of the 2026 movie Teenage Sex and Death at Camp Miasma.

== Track listing ==
CD single #1 (UK, Germany) (W798CD), 7" Single (US)

1. "Supernatural Superserious" – 3:25
2. "Airliner" – 2:21

CD single #2 (UK) (W798CDX)

1. "Supernatural Superserious" – 3:25
2. "Airliner" – 2:21
3. "Red Head Walking" – 2:11

== Personnel ==
- "Supernatural Superserious" written by Peter Buck, Mike Mills, and Michael Stipe.
- "Airliner" written by Buck, Mills, Stipe, and Scott McCaughey.
- "Red Head Walking" written by Calvin Johnson (Beat Happening cover, from their album Dreamy, 1991).

== Release history ==
Region	Date	Format
Worldwide	February 11, 2008	Digital download
United Kingdom	February 25, 2008	CD
United Kingdom	March 24, 2008	CD
United States	April 15, 2008	7" Vinyl

== Charts ==
=== Weekly charts ===
Chart (2008)	Peak position
Austria (Ö3 Austria Top 40)	26
Belgium (Ultratop 50 Flanders)	17
Belgium (Ultratop 50 Wallonia)	37
Canada Hot 100 (Billboard)	50
Germany (GfK)	26
Hungary (Editors' Choice Top 40)	31
Ireland (IRMA)	41
Italy (FIMI)	14
Netherlands (Dutch Top 40 Tipparade)	10
Netherlands (Single Top 100)	44
Norway (VG-lista)	1
Sweden (Sverigetopplistan)	17
Switzerland (Schweizer Hitparade)	21
UK Singles (OCC)	54
US Billboard Hot 100	85
US Adult Alternative Airplay (Billboard)	1
US Alternative Airplay (Billboard)	21
US Mainstream Rock (Billboard)	36

=== Year-end charts ===
Chart (2008)	Position
Belgium (Ultratop 50 Flanders)	77

=== Certifications ===
Region	Certification	Certified units/sales
Norway (IFPI Norway)	Platinum	10,000^{*}
Italy	—	19,838
^{*} Sales figures based on certification alone.
