= Man-Sized Wreath =

2008 single by R.E.M.

Single by R.E.M.

from the album Accelerate
- B-side: "Living Well Jesus Dog"; "Mr. Richards" (Live)
- Released: August 11, 2008
- Recorded: 2007
- Genre: Alternative rock; hard rock; punk rock
- Length: 2:32
- Label: Warner Bros.
- Songwriter(s): Peter Buck; Mike Mills; Michael Stipe
- Producer(s): Jacknife Lee; R.E.M.

R.E.M. singles chronology
"Hollow Man" (2008)	"Man-Sized Wreath" (2008)	"Until the Day Is Done" (2008)

"Man-Sized Wreath" is the second track and third single from R.E.M.'s fourteenth album Accelerate, released on August 11, 2008 in the UK. The single was announced after the band's Madison Square Garden show on June 19, 2008, where footage of the upcoming music video was shown. The single is available as a digital download and a limited edition clear-colored 7" vinyl single. The B-side "Living Well Jesus Dog" is either a demo or early take of "Living Well Is the Best Revenge," and gets its title from a comment Peter Buck makes at the beginning of the track as to whether or not Jesus had a dog, which prompts Michael Stipe to joke they should name the new album Did Jesus Have a Dog?

Before the performance of "Man-Sized Wreath" during R.E.M.'s live show at the Olympia Theatre in Dublin in 2007, Michael Stipe commented, "This next, new song will not be on our next record." Peter Buck then responds, "It's a little early to make that call."

== Music video ==
The video is produced by CRUSH Inc., a graphic-design and production studio based in Toronto, who also created the video for previous single "Hollow Man." Some footage of the video was shown during the band's June 19 concert at Madison Square Garden.

The video revolves around a man being followed by various block-shaped figures, said to represent the media.

== Track listing ==
7" single (W807)

1. "Man-Sized Wreath" – 2:32
2. "Living Well Jesus Dog" – 4:21

Digital download

1. "Man-Sized Wreath" – 2:32
2. "Living Well Jesus Dog" – 4:21
3. "Mr. Richards" (Live in Vancouver) – 3:54
