= (Don't Go Back To) Rockville =

1984 single by R.E.M.

Single by R.E.M.

from the album Reckoning
- B-side: "Catapult" (Live)
- Released: October 16, 1984
- Recorded: 1984
- Studio: Reflection Sound (Charlotte, North Carolina)
- Genre: Country rock; alternative country
- Length: 4:33; 3:55 (single version)
- Label: IRS
- Songwriters: Bill Berry; Peter Buck; Mike Mills; Michael Stipe
- Producers: Don Dixon; Mitch Easter

R.E.M. singles chronology
"So. Central Rain (I'm Sorry)" (1984)	"(Don't Go Back To) Rockville" (1984)	"Cant Get There from Here" (1985)

Alternative cover
- European release

"(Don't Go Back To) Rockville" is the second and final single released by American rock band R.E.M. from their second studio album, Reckoning. The song failed to chart on either the Billboard Hot 100 or the UK Singles Chart.

== Background ==
The song was written by the band's bassist Mike Mills, although it was credited to all four members of R.E.M. Mills wrote the song as a plea to girlfriend Ingrid Schorr, asking her to not move to Rockville, Maryland, where her parents lived. Schorr, who later became a journalist, has expressed amusement at the many factual inaccuracies about her relationship with Mills and the song's origins that have circulated among R.E.M. fans over the years. Peter Buck has stated that the song was originally performed in a punk/thrash style, and that it was recorded for this single in its now more-familiar country-inspired arrangement as a joke aimed at R.E.M. manager Bertis Downs.

Michael Stipe sings lead while Mills and Bill Berry provide backing and harmony vocals on the album version, although Mills usually sings the lead vocal of "Rockville" during live performances. A live version of the song was released as the B-side to "Leaving New York" in 2004 and on R.E.M. Live in 2007.

Twelve years after originally written, alternative rock band 10,000 Maniacs included a cover version as the fourth track on their 1992 single "Candy Everybody Wants".

== Track listings ==
All songs written by Bill Berry, Peter Buck, Mike Mills and Michael Stipe.

European singles

1. "(Don't Go Back To) Rockville" (Edit) – 3:55
2. "Wolves, Lower" – 4:14
3. "9-9" (Live)^{1} (12" only)
4. "Gardening at Night" (Live)^{1} (12" only)

US singles

1. "(Don't Go Back To) Rockville" (Edit) – 3:55
2. "Catapult" (Live)^{2}

=== Notes ===
^{1} Recorded at the Theater El Dorado, Paris, France, April 20, 1984.
^{2} Recorded at the Music Hall, Seattle, Washington, June 27, 1984.

== Personnel ==
Sources:

- Bill Berry – drums, backing vocals
- Peter Buck – guitar
- Mike Mills – bass, backing vocals, piano
- Michael Stipe – lead vocals
