= So. Central Rain (I'm Sorry) =

Song by R.E.M

Single by R.E.M.

from the album Reckoning
- B-side: "Walter's Theme; "King of the Road"; "Voice of Harold"; "Pale Blue Eyes"
- Released: May 15, 1984
- Recorded: 1983
- Studio: Reflection Sound (Charlotte, North Carolina)
- Genre: Alternative rock; jangle pop
- Length: 3:11
- Label: I.R.S.
- Songwriters: Bill Berry; Peter Buck; Mike Mills; Michael Stipe
- Producers: Mitch Easter; Don Dixon

R.E.M. singles chronology
| "Talk About the Passion" (1983) | "So. Central Rain (I'm Sorry)" (1984) | "(Don't Go Back To) Rockville" (1984) |

"So. Central Rain (I'm Sorry)" is a song by the American alternative rock band R.E.M. It was released in May 1984 as the first single from the group's second studio album, Reckoning.

R.E.M. performed a rough version of the song on the NBC television show Late Night with David Letterman on October 6, 1983—before the song had a title—in what was the band's first U.S. network television appearance.

== Music video ==
The video, directed by Howard Libov, was filmed at the Reflection Studio in Charlotte, North Carolina, during the recording of Reckoning, and first aired in June 1984. It featured the members of the band playing their instruments behind white screens (gobos) in an otherwise empty room, with Michael Stipe singing in the foreground. Stipe refused to lip sync to the song. Guitarist Peter Buck said, "We played a recording of the track, and the rest of us faked it, but Michael insisted on singing a new vocal to make it more real for him."

The song is also featured in the Left of Reckoning video shot by James Herbert.

== Track listings ==
All songs written by Bill Berry, Peter Buck, Mike Mills, and Michael Stipe unless otherwise indicated.

7" Single

1. "So. Central Rain (I'm Sorry)" – 3:16
2. "Walter's Theme" / "King of the Road" (Roger Miller) – 4:44

12" single

1. "So. Central Rain (I'm Sorry)" – 3:16
2. "Voice of Harold" – 4:25
3. "Pale Blue Eyes" (Lou Reed) – 2:54

Notes:

- "Walter's Theme", "King of the Road", "Voice of Harold" and "Pale Blue Eyes" can all be found on Dead Letter Office.
- "Walter's Theme" is not listed on the cover.
- The album title-listing contains an initial lower-case 's', following a pattern in the album's listings where random capital letters are made lower-case and random lower-case letters are capitalized. The front cover art lists it as 'So CENTRAL RAiN', with '7 chineSe bros.' on the back track listings differing from the cover art as well.
- The album's inner sleeve lists the full title as "Southern Central Rain (I'm Sorry)".

== Personnel ==
Sources:

- Bill Berry – drums
- Peter Buck – guitar
- Mike Mills – bass, backing vocals, piano
- Michael Stipe – lead vocals

== Chart positions ==
| Chart (1984) | Peak position |
|---|---|
| U.S. Billboard Hot 100 | 85 |
| U.S. Billboard Mainstream Rock Tracks | 43 |
