= Fall on Me (R.E.M. song) =

R.E.M. song

- Artwork for North American, French, and Dutch vinyl releases

Single by R.E.M.

from the album Lifes Rich Pageant
- B-side: "Rotary Ten"
- Released: August 1986
- Recorded: 1986
- Studio: Belmont Mall (Belmont, Indiana)
- Genre: Alternative rock; folk rock; jangle pop
- Length: 2:50
- Label: I.R.S.
- Songwriters: Bill Berry; Peter Buck; Mike Mills; Michael Stipe
- Producer: Don Gehman

R.E.M. singles chronology
"Wendell Gee" (1985)	"Fall on Me" (1986)	"Superman" (1986)

"Fall on Me" is a song by the American alternative rock band R.E.M. from their fourth album Lifes Rich Pageant (1986). It was the first of two singles released from that LP. It peaked at number 94 on the Billboard Hot 100 and number 5 on the Mainstream Rock charts, helping the band reach a wider audience.

The song was one of the band's early compositions about environmentalism, discussing acid rain. It also transitioned from their murky lyrics and jangling guitar of their first three albums to a more accessible sound influenced by producer Don Gehman.

== Meaning and origin ==
Though R.E.M. singer Michael Stipe once described the song as "pretty much a song about oppression," the subject of the song was initially about acid rain and its effects on the environment, hence the first line of the chorus, "Don't fall on me."

When it first appeared during live concerts in 1985, the song had a different melody which had been entirely rewritten by the time of its recording for Lifes Rich Pageant. The counter-melody in the second verse is actually the song's original tune and features the original acid rain inspired lyrics.

In an interview with David Fricke, singer Michael Stipe commented that the finished version of the song "is not about acid rain. It's a general oppression song about the fact that there are a lot of causes out there that need a song that says, 'Don't smash us.' And specifically, there are references to the Leaning Tower of Pisa and the guy dropping weights and feathers."

In audience patter prior to a performance of the song on VH1 Storytellers in 1998, Stipe again mentioned the apocryphal tale of Galileo Galilei dropping feathers and lead weights off the Leaning Tower of Pisa (to test the laws of gravity) as partial inspiration for the first verse.

== Reception ==
Billboard said it is "hum-worthy and top 40-compatible, though the subliminal stuff is here, too."

== Music video ==
Stipe filmed and directed the video for this song, in which the lyrics are seen superimposed over upside-down, black-and-white footage of a quarry and various pieces of abandoned equipment.

== Track listing ==
All songs written by Bill Berry, Peter Buck, Mike Mills and Michael Stipe unless otherwise indicated.

1. "Fall on Me" – 2:50
2. "Rotary Ten" – 1:58

=== UK 12" ===
1. "Fall on Me" – 2:50
2. "Rotary Ten" – 1:58
3. "Toys in the Attic" (Aerosmith cover; Steven Tyler & Joe Perry) – 2:26

The B-side to this single is an instrumental entitled "Rotary Ten", a song which has been described by guitarist Peter Buck as "a movie theme without a movie." It would gain a sequel of sorts, "Rotary Eleven" for the "Losing My Religion" single in 1991.

== Personnel ==
- Bill Berry – drums, vocals
- Peter Buck – guitar
- Mike Mills – bass, vocals
- Michael Stipe – vocals

== Charts ==
Chart (1986)	Peak position
U.S. Billboard Hot 100	94
U.S. Billboard Mainstream Rock Tracks	5

== Cover versions ==
The folk supergroup, Cry Cry Cry (Dar Williams, Richard Shindell, and Lucy Kaplansky) used "Fall on Me" as the opening track for their eponymous album of cover songs. Tooth and Nail melodic rap duo Furthermore, covered the song on their 2002 album She and I. Matt Nathanson included an acoustic cover of this song on the deluxe version of his 2013 album Last of the Great Pretenders. Death Cab for Cutie covered the song on their 2020 The Georgia E.P.
