= R.E.M. at the BBC =

2018 live album

Live album by R.E.M.
- Released: October 19, 2018
- Recorded: Multiple dates between 1984 and 2008
- Venue: Various BBC studios
- Genre: Alternative rock
- Length: 446:17 (8-disc audio); 149:15 (Best Of)
- Label: Craft Recordings

R.E.M. chronology
7IN—83–88 (2014)	R.E.M. at the BBC (2018)	Live at the Borderline 1991 (2019)

R.E.M. at the BBC is a 2018 live album box set by American alternative rock band R.E.M. released on October 19, 2018. The eight-disc compilation features sessions recorded between 1984 and 2008, including a bonus DVD of videos. Additionally, a two-disc best-of collection was released on the same day.

== Recording and release ==
Sources include four live concert broadcasts - the complete 1995 performance at Milton Keynes, almost all of the 1999 performance at Glastonbury (missing is one song, The Great Beyond, between Fall On Me and Daysleeper), and more heavily edited versions of Nottingham 1984 (missing 4 tracks of the main set plus most of the encores), and St. James Church 2004 (missing 4 tracks) - plus a number of shorter studio sessions recorded for BBC programs such as a John Peel session, Drivetime, Mark and Lard, and BBC Radio 1's Live Lounge.

On September 20, a promotional video for "Orange Crush" was released, followed on September 27 by "E-Bow the Letter", featuring Radiohead singer Thom Yorke.

== Reception ==
In The Irish Times, Stephen Jones gave the album seven out of 10, writing that it includes some "real treats" but criticizes some "tinny and echoey" recordings. Andrzej Lukowski of Drowned in Sound rated the album an eight out of 10, summing up that it is a useful document of R.E.M.'s career: "Live at the BBC is obviously preposterously big... but actually that’s kind of fine in the digital era—it’s not that old fashioned beast ‘the live album’, but a whole sprawling history to immerse yourself in, eras hurtling by." Under the Radar's Michael James Hall gave the box set 8.5 out of 10, praising the performances for being able to "remind you just how masterful they were as songwriters". James Parker of The Atlantic gave the album a positive review, calling it a "a vast and slightly dizzying retrospective". David Fricke of Rolling Stone made this release one of his weekly picks. For Pitchfork, Chris Randle gave the collection a 7.4 out of 10, praising Stipe's lyrics and singing in particular. For Exclaim!, Ian Gormely awarded At the BBC an eight out of 10, praising the compilation's diversity, with "surprisingly little overlap across the collection" and summing up, "Though the material included here is strong, due to the limitations its compilers were working with... it doesn't necessarily represent the best or most unique sets of their respective eras." Ian Rushbury of PopMatters also gave the set an eight out of 10 in his review, calling the group, "without doubt, an outstanding live band" and writing that the DVD is "invaluable".

== Track listing ==
All songs written by Bill Berry, Peter Buck, Mike Mills, and Michael Stipe, except where noted.

Disc 1 (64:17)

Sessions into the Night, BBC Radio 1, March 13, 1991

1. "World Leader Pretend" – 4:36
2. "Fretless" – 5:16
3. "Half a World Away" – 3:33
4. "Radio Song" – 4:05
5. "Losing My Religion" – 4:42
6. "Love Is All Around" (Reg Presley) – 3:09

John Peel Studio Session, October 25, 1998

7. "Walk Unafraid" (Buck, Mills, and Stipe) – 4:04
8. "Daysleeper" (Buck, Mills, and Stipe) – 3:18
9. "Lotus" (Buck, Mills, and Stipe) – 4:13
10. "At My Most Beautiful" (Buck, Mills, and Stipe) – 3:16

Mark and Lard, BBC Radio 1, October 15, 2003

11. "Bad Day" – 4:03
12. "Orange Crush" – 3:55

Drivetime, BBC Radio 2, October 15, 2003

13. "Man on the Moon" – 4:59
14. "Imitation of Life" (Buck, Mills, and Stipe) – 3:41

Radio 1 Live Lounge, March 26, 2008

15. "Supernatural Superserious" (Buck, Mills, and Stipe) – 3:23
16. "Munich" (Edward Lay, Russell Leetch, Tom Smith, and Chris Urbanowicz) – 3:18

Disc 2 (62:32)

Sessions BBC Radio 1 Public Peel Session, October 25, 1998

1. Introduction – 0:26
2. "Losing My Religion" – 4:44
3. "New Test Leper" – 5:53
4. "Lotus" (Buck, Mills, and Stipe) – 4:48
5. "Parakeet" (Buck, Mills, and Stipe) – 4:23
6. "Electrolite" – 4:23
7. "Perfect Circle" – 4:39
8. "The Apologist" (Buck, Mills, and Stipe) – 4:40
9. "Daysleeper" (Buck, Mills, and Stipe) – 4:44
10. "Country Feedback" – 7:23
11. "At My Most Beautiful" (Buck, Mills, and Stipe) – 4:14
12. "Walk Unafraid" (Buck, Mills, and Stipe) – 4:52
13. "Man on the Moon" – 6:11

Disc 3 (58:49)

Live Broadcasts Rock City, Nottingham, November 21, 1984

1. "Second Guessing" – 2:57
2. "Hyena" – 2:57
3. "Talk About the Passion" – 3:04
4. "West of the Fields" (Neil Bogan, Berry, Buck, Mills, and Stipe) – 3:07
5. "(Don't Go Back To) Rockville" – 4:29
6. "Auctioneer (Another Engine)" – 3:01
7. "So. Central Rain (I'm Sorry)" – 4:51
8. "Old Man Kensey" – 4:24
9. "Gardening at Night" – 3:26
10. "9–9"/"Hey Diddle Diddle" (traditional)/"Feeling Gravitys Pull" – 5:39
11. "Windout" – 1:49
12. "Driver 8" – 3:25
13. "Pretty Persuasion" – 3:33
14. "Radio Free Europe" – 3:49
15. "Wendell Gee" – 3:21
16. "Carnival of Sorts (Boxcars)" – 4:47

Disc 4 (51:59)

Live Broadcasts Milton Keynes, July 30, 1995

1. "What's the Frequency, Kenneth?" – 3:58
2. "Crush with Eyeliner" – 4:42
3. "Drive" – 3:51
4. "Turn You Inside Out" – 4:17
5. "Try Not to Breathe" – 3:50
6. "I Took Your Name" – 4:15
7. "Undertow" – 5:16
8. "Bang and Blame" – 4:58
9. "I Don't Sleep I Dream" – 4:14
10. "Strange Currencies" – 4:31
11. "Revolution" – 3:20
12. "Tongue" – 4:38

Disc 5 (56:43)

Live Broadcasts Milton Keynes, July 30, 1995

1. "Man on the Moon" – 5:46
2. "Country Feedback" – 6:49
3. "Half a World Away" – 4:04
4. "Losing My Religion" – 4:54
5. "Pop Song 89" – 3:27
6. "Finest Worksong" – 3:48
7. "Get Up" – 2:54
8. "Star 69" – 4:00
9. "Let Me In" – 3:59
10. "Everybody Hurts" – 7:24
11. "Fall on Me" – 3:11
12. "Departure" – 3:52
13. "It's the End of the World as We Know It (And I Feel Fine)" – 5:15

Disc 6 (43:05)

Live Broadcasts Pyramid Stage Glastonbury Festival, June 25, 1999

1. "Lotus" (Buck, Mills, and Stipe) – 4:36
2. "What's the Frequency, Kenneth?" – 4:09
3. "So Fast, So Numb" – 4:47
4. "The Apologist" (Buck, Mills, and Stipe) – 4:36
5. "Fall on Me" – 3:26
6. "Daysleeper" (Buck, Mills, and Stipe) – 3:29
7. "The Wake-Up Bomb" – 5:01
8. "The One I Love" – 3:27
9. "Sweetness Follows" – 5:50
10. "At My Most Beautiful" (Buck, Mills, and Stipe) – 3:37

Disc 7 (53:28)

Live Broadcasts Pyramid Stage Glastonbury Festival, June 25, 1999

1. "Losing My Religion" – 5:24
2. "Everybody Hurts" – 6:47
3. "Walk Unafraid" (Buck, Mills, and Stipe) – 4:17
4. "Star 69" – 3:04
5. "Finest Worksong" – 4:22
6. "Man on the Moon" – 5:43
7. "Why Not Smile" (Buck, Mills, and Stipe) – 2:10
8. "Crush with Eyeliner" – 4:40
9. "Tongue" – 5:19
10. "Cuyahoga" – 4:37
11. "It's the End of the World as We Know It (And I Feel Fine)" – 6:58

Disc 8 (55:24)

Live Broadcasts St. James’ Church, London Radio 2, September 15, 2004

1. Intro – 0:47
2. "So Fast, So Numb" – 5:13
3. "Boy in the Well" (Buck, Mills, and Stipe) – 5:20
4. "I Wanted to Be Wrong" (Buck, Mills, and Stipe) – 5:19
5. "E-Bow the Letter" – 5:09
6. "Around the Sun" (Buck, Mills, and Stipe) – 5:02
7. "Aftermath" (Buck, Mills, and Stipe) – 3:58
8. "Losing My Religion" – 4:47
9. "Walk Unafraid" – 5:10
10. "Leaving New York" (Buck, Mills, and Stipe) – 4:48
11. "Imitation of Life" – 4:35
12. "Man on the Moon" – 5:34

Disc 9 (DVD)

Accelerating Backwards

1. "Moon River" (Henry Mancini and Johnny Mercer)
2. "Pretty Persuasion"
3. "Pop Song 89"
4. "Orange Crush"
5. "Losing My Religion"
6. "Half a World Away"
7. "Crush with Eyeliner"
8. "Man on the Moon"
9. "Daysleeper" (Buck, Mills, and Stipe)
10. "Imitation of Life" (Buck, Mills, and Stipe)
11. "So. Central Rain (I'm Sorry)"
12. "All the Way to Reno (You're Gonna Be a Star)" (Buck, Mills, and Stipe)
13. "Leaving New York" (Buck, Mills, and Stipe)

Later... with Jools Holland Presents R.E.M.

1. Intro
2. "Losing My Religion"
3. "Lotus" (Buck, Mills, and Stipe)
4. "New Test Leper"
5. "Daysleeper" (Buck, Mills, and Stipe)
6. "Electrolite"
7. "At My Most Beautiful" (Buck, Mills, and Stipe)
8. "The Apologist" (Buck, Mills, and Stipe)
9. "Country Feedback"
10. "Parakeet" (Buck, Mills, and Stipe)
11. "So. Central Rain (I'm Sorry)"
12. "Walk Unafraid" (Buck, Mills, and Stipe)
13. "Man on the Moon
14. "The Passenger" (Ricky Gardiner and Iggy Pop)

Bonus Videos

1. "I've Been High" (Buck, Mills, and Stipe)
2. "Nightswimming"
3. "Bad Day"

=== Best Of ===
Disc 1 – Sessions (69:21)

Recorded for Nicky Campbell session Into the Night on BBC Radio 1, first broadcast on March 13, 1991

1. "World Leader Pretend" – 4:36
2. "Half a World Away" – 3:33
3. "Radio Song" – 4:05
4. "Losing My Religion" – 4:42

Recorded for John Peel Session on BBC Radio 1, first broadcast on October 25, 1998

5. "Lotus" (Buck, Mills, and Stipe) – 4:13
6. "At My Most Beautiful" (Buck, Mills, and Stipe) – 3:16

Recorded for John Peel Session on BBC Radio 1, first broadcast October 25, 1998

7. "Electrolite" – 4:23
8. "Perfect Circle" – 4:39
9. "Daysleeper" (Buck, Mills, and Stipe) – 4:44

Recorded for Later... with Jools Holland on BBC1, first broadcast on October 27, 1998

10. "Country Feedback" – 6:49

Recorded for Mark and Lard on BBC Radio 1, first broadcast on October 15, 2003

11. "Bad Day" – 4:03
12. "Orange Crush" – 3:55

Recorded for Later... with Jools Holland on BBC1, first broadcast on October 14, 2003

13. "Nightswimming" – 4:20

Recorded for Drivetime on BBC Radio 2, first broadcast October 15, 2003

14. "Man on the Moon" – 4:59

Recorded for Radio 1 Live Lounge on BBC Radio 1, first broadcast March 26, 2008

15. "Imitation of Life" (Buck, Mills, and Stipe) – 3:41
16. "Supernatural Superserious" (Buck, Mills, and Stipe) – 3:23

Disc 2 – Broadcasts (79:54)

First broadcast on November 21, 1984 from Rock City, Nottingham

1. "(Don't Go Back To) Rockville" – 4:29
2. "So. Central Rain (I'm Sorry)" – 4:51
3. "Gardening at Night" – 3:26
4. "Driver 8" – 3:25
5. "Radio Free Europe" – 3:49

First broadcast on July 30, 1995 from Milton Keynes

6. "What's the Frequency, Kenneth?" – 3:54
7. "Crush with Eyeliner" – 4:42
8. "Drive" – 3:51
9. "Half a World Away" – 4:04
10. "Pop Song 89" – 3:27
11. "Finest Worksong" – 3:48

First broadcast on June 25, 1999 from Pyramid Stage Glastonbury Festival

12. "Fall on Me" – 3:26
13. "The One I Love" – 3:27
14. "Everybody Hurts" – 6:47
15. "It's the End of the World as We Know It (And I Feel Fine)" – 6:58

First broadcast on September 15, 2004 from St. James's Church, London

16. "E-Bow the Letter" – 5:09
17. "Losing My Religion" – 4:47
18. "Man on the Moon" – 5:34

== Personnel ==
=== R.E.M. ===
- Bill Berry – drums, percussion, vocal harmony (1984–1995 recordings)
- Peter Buck – acoustic and electric guitar
- Mike Mills – bass guitar, keyboards, backing vocals
- Michael Stipe – vocals

=== Additional musicians ===
- B. J. Cole – lap steel and pedal steel guitars (on select songs during the British leg of the 1998 tour)
- Nathan December – rhythm and lead guitar (1995 recordings)
- Brian Harris - bass
- Jools Holland – piano on "The Passenger" for the 1998 Later... with Jools Holland Presents R.E.M.
- Peter Holsapple – rhythm guitar, keyboards (1991 recordings)
- Scott McCaughey – bass guitar, guitar, keyboards, backing vocals (recordings from 1994 onward)
- Bill Rieflin – drums, percussion (2003–2008 recordings)
- Duane Saetveit - French horn
- Ken Stringfellow – bass guitar, guitar, keyboards, backing vocals (1998–2005 recordings)
- Joey Waronker – drums, percussion (1998–1999 recordings)
- Thom Yorke – vocals on "E-Bow the Letter"

=== Other personnel ===
- Tom Doyle – liner notes
- Mark Hagen – liner notes
- Jo Whiley – liner notes

== Charts ==
Chart (2018)	Peak position
Austrian Albums (Ö3 Austria)	60
Belgian Albums (Ultratop Flanders)	75
Belgian Albums (Ultratop Wallonia)	78
Dutch Albums (Album Top 100)	86
German Albums (Offizielle Top 100)	23
Italian Albums (FIMI)	75
Portuguese Albums (AFP)	29
Scottish Albums (Official Charts)	19
Swiss Albums (Schweizer Hitparade)	94
UK Albums (Official Charts)	40

Chart (2020)	Peak position
Spanish Albums (PROMUSICAE)	62
