= Road Movie (video) =

Video by R.E.M.
- Released: August 25, 1996
- Recorded: November 18–21, 1995
- Venues: The Omni, Atlanta, Georgia, United States
- Genre: Alternative rock
- Length: 90:00
- Label: Warner Reprise Video
- Director: Peter Care

R.E.M. chronology
New Adventures in Hi-Fi (1996)	Road Movie (1996)	R.E.M.: In the Attic – Alternative Recordings 1985–1989 (1997)

R.E.M. video chronology
Parallel (1995)	Road Movie (1996)	In View: The Best of R.E.M. 1988-2003 (2003)

R.E.M. live albums chronology
Tourfilm (1990)	Road Movie (1996)	Vancouver Rehearsal Tapes (2003)

Road Movie is a documentary-style film by rock group R.E.M., released on both VHS and DVD, charting the conclusion of the band's 1995 worldwide tour in support of Monster, their album released the previous year. Directed by Peter Care, the ninety-minute-long footage features nineteen songs (all but one a montage) performed over the final three nights (November 18, 19 and 21) of the tour, at The Omni in Atlanta, Georgia. The set-list reads very much like a complete R.E.M. show—gigs on the Monster tour were opened by either "I Took Your Name" or "What's the Frequency, Kenneth?" (with the former taking precedence in this case), while the last song of the night was invariably "It's the End of the World as We Know It (And I Feel Fine)" (as it is here). The film is a companion piece to the Tourfilm documentary (with a synonymous title), which chronicles the band's 1989 tour on the back of the previous year's album Green.

The songs included, by album, are: "The One I Love" and "It's the End of the World As We Know It (And I Feel Fine)" from Document; "Orange Crush" as the sole offering from Green; "Losing My Religion" and "Country Feedback" from Out of Time; "Everybody Hurts", "Find the River" and "Man on the Moon" from Automatic For The People; "I Took Your Name", "What's the Frequency, Kenneth?", "Crush with Eyeliner", "Tongue", "Star 69", "Let Me In" and "Strange Currencies" from the then-new Monster; and "Undertow", "The Wake-Up Bomb" and "Binky the Doormat" from the then-forthcoming New Adventures in Hi-Fi. "Revolution" was eventually released on the Batman & Robin soundtrack in 1997.

== Track listing ==
All songs written by Bill Berry, Peter Buck, Mike Mills and Michael Stipe.

1. Intro – 0:19
2. "I Took Your Name" (unedited from the second night) – 3:56
3. "What's the Frequency, Kenneth?" – 3:42
4. "Crush with Eyeliner" – 4:37
5. "Undertow" – 5:15
6. "The Wake-Up Bomb" – 5:10
7. "Revolution" – 3:08
8. "Losing My Religion" – 4:47
9. "Binky the Doormat" – 5:23
10. "Orange Crush" – 3:55
11. "Strange Currencies" – 4:27
12. "Tongue" – 4:42
13. "Man on the Moon" – 5:43
14. "Country Feedback" – 6:21
15. "Find the River" – 4:21
16. "The One I Love" – 3:23
17. "Star 69" – 3:25
18. "Let Me In" – 4:08
19. "Everybody Hurts" – 5:52
20. "It's the End of the World as We Know It (And I Feel Fine)" (mostly from the final night) – 5:03

The performances of "Undertow", "The Wake-Up Bomb" and "Binky the Doormat" were included as b-sides on the "Bittersweet Me" and "Electrolite" singles.

During the performance of "Let Me In", Mike Mills plays Kurt Cobain's guitar (upside down because Cobain was left-handed).

Aside from the members of R.E.M., the video also features guest musicians Nathan December, Scott McCaughey, and Australian violinist Amanda Brown. Brown joins the band for "Losing My Religion", "Binky the Doormat", "Strange Currencies", "Find the River" and "Everybody Hurts". For those fans who were unable to make it to any of the dates, it gives an example of the structure of the live show. The piece spotlights filmic backdrops by artists such as James Herbert, Jem Cohen, Jim McKay, Dominic DeJoseph and Lance Bangs. It has also been released in DVD format.

The movie was debuted at the 50th Edinburgh International Film Festival in August 1996. The following month, during outside listening parties in Atlanta, Boston, Chicago, Los Angeles, and New York, preview showings were projected onto buildings three stories high.

In 2001, to coincide with the release of Reveal, a three-video box set comprising Tourfilm, Parallel and Road Movie was released in the UK. (This Film Is On replaced Road Movie in the DVD-format release.)

The 25th anniversary deluxe edition of Monster, released in 2019, contains Road Movie in Blu-ray format.

== Personnel ==
R.E.M.

- Bill Berry – drums, percussion, bass, vocals
- Peter Buck – guitar, bass
- Mike Mills – bass, keyboards, guitar, vocals
- Michael Stipe – lead vocals

Additional musicians

- Amanda Brown – violin
- Nathan December – guitar
- Scott McCaughey – guitar, keyboards

== Certifications ==
Organization	Level	Date
BPI – UK	Gold	July 22, 2013
