= Parallel (video) =

Video by R.E.M.
- Released: May 30, 1995
- Genre: Alternative rock
- Label: Warner Bros.

R.E.M. chronology
R.E.M.: Singles Collected (1994)	Parallel (1995)	New Adventures in Hi-Fi (1996)

R.E.M. videos video chronology
This Film Is On (1991)	Parallel (1995)	Road Movie (1996)

Parallel is a video feature compiling all of R.E.M.'s Automatic for the People and Monster-era promotional videos, as well as several recorded for this release alone. It was released on video on May 30, 1995, and on DVD format on August 22, 2000, both on the Warner Brothers label.

The release, which runs at 70 minutes, features promotional videos to all of the band's singles from Automatic for the People and all but one from Monster ("Tongue" had not been released as a single until after this compilation). Also included are several avant-garde clips excerpted from 1995 tour films, ranging from ten seconds to two minutes, playing in between each song, as well as an A–Z of R.E.M. at the end of the feature.

There are no bonus features on the DVD; however, there is an optional lyrics subtitle track. Audio on the DVD-5 is PCM Stereo. The DVD was certified "15" in the UK due to nudity in 'Nightswimming'.

There were two versions released in the US. The "A Version" cut out the nudity from "Nightswimming," while the "D Version" contained the uncut video. A Parental Advisory warning was placed on the cover of the "D Version."

== Track listing ==
All songs written by Bill Berry, Peter Buck, Mike Mills and Michael Stipe. Video directors are in parentheses.

1. Flowers (Jim McKay) / Title Sequence (Lance Bangs & Chris Bilheimer)
2. "Drive" (Peter Care)
3. Surveillance (Jem Cohen)
4. "Man on the Moon" (Peter Care)
5. Mercer Loop (Jem Cohen)
6. "The Sidewinder Sleeps Tonite" (Kevin Kerslake)
7. Midtown (Jim McKay)
8. "Everybody Hurts" (Jake Scott)
9. Fish and Boots (James Herbert)
10. "Nightswimming" (Jem Cohen)
11. X-Rays (Jem Cohen)
12. "Find the River" (Jodi Wille)
13. Runt (Lance Bangs)
14. "What's The Frequency, Kenneth?" (Peter Care)
15. Flying Furniture (Dominic DeJoseph)
16. "Bang and Blame" (Randy Skinner)
17. Delinquents (Lance Bangs)
18. "Star 69" (Jonathan Dayton & Valerie Faris)
19. Chinatown (Jim McKay)
20. "Strange Currencies" (Mark Romanek)
21. Hula Hoops and Bubble Gum (Dominic DeJoseph)
22. "Crush With Eyeliner" (Spike Jonze)
23. R.E.M. A B C (Jonathan Dayton & Valerie Faris) (excerpted from the 1995 documentary Rough Cut)
24. "Star Me Kitten" (live) / Credits (Jonathan Dayton & Valerie Faris) (excerpted from Rough Cut)

== Sales certifications ==
Organization	Level	Date
BPI – UK	Gold	July 22, 2013
