= Electron Blue =

Single by R.E.M.

Single by R.E.M.

from the album Around the Sun
- B-side: "What's the Frequency, Kenneth?" (live)
- Released: February 28, 2005
- Genre: Alternative rock
- Length: 4:12
- Label: Warner Bros.
- Songwriter(s): Peter Buck; Mike Mills; Michael Stipe
- Producer(s): Pat McCarthy; R.E.M.

R.E.M. singles chronology
"Aftermath" (2004)	"Electron Blue" (2005)	"Wanderlust" (2005)

"Electron Blue" is a song by American alternative rock band R.E.M. It was released as the third single from their thirteenth studio album Around the Sun on February 28, 2005. Written by group members Peter Buck, Mike Mills and Michael Stipe, the song features a synthesizer-heavy arrangement. Its lyrics describe an electric hallucinogenic drug made of light, a concept which was developed from a recurring dream of Stipe's. Upon release as a single, "Electron Blue" peaked at numbers 43 and 26 on the singles charts of Ireland and the United Kingdom respectively. Michael Stipe performed on the Around the Sun tour with a blue band painted across his eyes as a reference to the song, his personal favorite from Around the Sun.

== Background and composition ==
Written and recorded for the album Around the Sun (2004), R.E.M. lead singer Michael Stipe described "Electron Blue" as one of his more future-themed songs.

"Electron Blue" features prominent use of the synthesizer and has been compared by Stipe to the work of English musician Brian Eno. Its lyrics, which consist almost entirely of rhyming couplets, describe a hallucinogenic drug made of light.

Stipe has referred to "Electron Blue" as his favorite song on Around the Sun, as well as one of his all-time favorite R.E.M. songs. It also inspired his stage appearance for the subsequent Around the Sun tour: a blue band painted across his eyes. The song "Sing for the Submarine", from the band's fourteenth studio album Accelerate (2008), references "Electron Blue" and explores the same concept.

== Commercial performance ==
"Electron Blue" was released as the third single from Around the Sun on February 28, 2005. It debuted at its peak position of number 26 on the UK Singles Chart on the issue dated March 12, 2005, remaining on the chart for an additional week. The single also peaked at number 43 on the Irish Singles Chart.

== Formats and track listings ==
- CD single 1 (United Kingdom)

7-inch single (United Kingdom)

1. "Electron Blue" – 4:12
2. "What's the Frequency, Kenneth?" (live in Atlanta, October 23, 2004) – 3:50
- CD single 2 (United Kingdom)
1. "Electron Blue" – 4:12
2. "Sweetness Follows" (live in Cincinnati, October 27, 2004) – 4:05
3. "Leaving New York" (live video, Helsinki January 29, 2005) – 4:48

== Charts ==
Chart (2005)	Peak position
Ireland (IRMA)	43
Scotland (OCC)	29
UK Singles (OCC)	26

== Bibliography ==
- Rosen, Craig (2005). Inside Out: The Stories Behind Every Song. Carlton. ISBN 978-1-8444-2449-8.
