= Perfect Square =

Video by R.E.M.
- Released: May 9, 2004
- Recorded: July 19, 2003
- Venues: Bowling Green, Wiesbaden, Germany
- Genre: Alternative rock
- Length: 143:00
- Label: Warner Reprise Video
- Director: Julia Knowles

R.E.M. chronology
In View: The Best of R.E.M. 1988–2003 (2003)	Perfect Square (2004)	Around the Sun (2004)

R.E.M. video chronology
In View: The Best of R.E.M. 1988–2003 (2003)	Perfect Square (2004)	When the Light Is Mine: The Best of the I.R.S. Years 1982–1987 (2006)

R.E.M. live albums chronology
Vancouver Rehearsal Tapes (2003)	Perfect Square (2004)	R.E.M. Live (2007)

Perfect Square is a 2004 concert film of the alternative rock band R.E.M., filmed on July 19, 2003, at the Bowling Green in Wiesbaden, Germany. It was released by Warner Reprise Video on March 9, 2004.

The concert features a performance of the song "Country Feedback", which Michael Stipe opens by declaring it his "favorite song". The rendition features appended lyrics from another song, Reveal's "Chorus and the Ring", and a guitar solo by Peter Buck, neither of which are in the original. The performance (in audio form) also found its way onto the limited edition issue of the In Time compilation, which was released a few months after the Wiesbaden concert.

Other concert highlights include the appearance of two then-new songs, "Bad Day" (Also originally known as PSA when first written in the early 1980s) and "Animal", and the re-emergence of the long-lost song "Permanent Vacation". "Permanent Vacation" dates back to 1980, years before their first album, while "Bad Day" dates back to 1985.

Included on the DVD release is a bonus documentary, A Stirling Performance, chronicling the band's three-night stand at Stirling Castle in Scotland in July 1999. The documentary demonstrates the effect the concerts had on Stirling and its residents. It was released in 2000.

== Audio ==
- Dolby Digital Stereo
- Dolby Digital 5.1

== Track listing ==
All songs written by Bill Berry, Peter Buck, Mike Mills and Michael Stipe except as indicated.

1. "Begin the Begin" – 4:04
2. "What's the Frequency, Kenneth?" – 4:12
3. "Maps and Legends" – 3:28
4. "Drive" – 4:44
5. "Animal" (Buck, Mills, Stipe) – 4:22
6. "Daysleeper" (Buck, Mills, Stipe) – 3:46
7. "The Great Beyond" (Buck, Mills, Stipe) – 4:17
8. "Bad Day" – 4:24
9. "The One I Love" – 3:22
10. "All the Way to Reno (You're Gonna Be a Star)" (Buck, Mills, Stipe) – 5:00
11. "Orange Crush" – 3:59
12. "Losing My Religion" – 4:45
13. "At My Most Beautiful" (Buck, Mills, Stipe) – 3:37
14. "Electrolite" – 4:28
15. "She Just Wants to Be" (Buck, Mills, Stipe) – 5:58
16. "Walk Unafraid" (Buck, Mills, Stipe) – 5:16
17. "Man on the Moon" – 5:57
18. "Everybody Hurts" – 6:26
19. "So Fast, So Numb" – 4:24
20. "Country Feedback" – 6:11
21. "Permanent Vacation" – 2:52
22. "Imitation of Life" (Buck, Mills, Stipe) – 3:55
23. "It's the End of the World as We Know It (And I Feel Fine)" – 5:55

== Personnel ==
R.E.M.

- Peter Buck – guitar, bass guitar, banjo, mandolin
- Mike Mills – bass guitar, backing vocals, piano
- Michael Stipe – lead vocals

Auxiliary musicians

- Scott McCaughey – guitar, keyboard, vocals
- Bill Rieflin – drums, percussion
- Ken Stringfellow – keyboard, banjo, bass guitar, vocals

== Certifications ==
Certifications and sales for Perfect Square
Region	Certification	Certified units/sales
Argentina (CAPIF)	Platinum	8,000^{^}
Australia (ARIA)	Gold	7,500^{^}
United Kingdom (BPI)	Gold	25,000^{*}
^{*} Sales figures based on certification alone.^{^} Shipments figures based on certification alone.
