= Tongue (song) =

1995 R.E.M. song

Single by R.E.M.

from the album Monster
- Released: July 17, 1995
- Genre: Soul
- Length: 4:08
- Label: Warner Bros.
- Songwriters: Bill Berry; Peter Buck; Mike Mills; Michael Stipe
- Producers: Scott Litt; R.E.M.

R.E.M. singles chronology
"Strange Currencies" (1995)	"Tongue" (1995)	"E-Bow the Letter" (1996)

Music video
- "Tongue" on YouTube

"Tongue" is a song by American rock band R.E.M., released on July 17, 1995, by Warner Bros. Records as the fifth and final single from their ninth studio album, Monster (1994). The song was written by the band and produced by them with Scott Litt. It was only released in the United States, United Kingdom, Ireland, and Japan. In the song, lead singer Michael Stipe performs in falsetto; he has stated on several occasions that the narrator of the song is female. Stipe has also said the track is "all about cunnilingus".

The single's music video, directed by Jonathan Dayton and Valerie Faris and shot during the soundcheck prior to the band's June 20, 1995, performance at the Knickerbocker Arena in Albany, New York, shows a group of teenagers in a living room watching the band perform on TV. The version of the song that plays is slightly higher in tone than that of the album version. It was included as a bonus video on the DVD release of In View - The Best of R.E.M. 1988-2003.

== Critical reception ==
Steve Baltin from Cash Box named 'Tongue' Pick of the Week in October 1995, noting that "this lovely single" finds R.E.M. "drastically toning down the energy of previous offerings", as 'What's the Frequency, Kenneth?', 'Bang & Blame' and 'Crush with Eyeliner'. He added further, "Against a simple organstyled arrangement Michael Stipe delivers an impressive falsetto that is one of the sweetest things the band has ever put on record. With the tour still going strong and the success of 'Everybody Hurts' from the last album, there appears to be a promising future for this song. While Triple A will be the first to jump on the bandwagon, they will not be alone, as CHR, Top 40 and maybe even Modern Rock outlets will find room on their playlists for one of the most bankable acts in rock."

Chuck Campbell from Knoxville News Sentinel described it as "romantic" and "organ-laden". Andrew Mueller from Melody Maker named it "the only duffer" of the album, "which sounds like Prince trying to falsetto through a Tom Waits ballad." Music & Media wrote, "Stipe tries his first-ever falsetto, which is like Bono squeezing a 'Lemon'. Maybe a bit off the wall for ACE radio, but as it's a ballad repeated spins will win over even the most wary." Keith Cameron from NME described it as "a vaguely sinister, slightly daffy detour with Stipe copping his best Smokey Robinson hi-pitched croon to only shoulder-shrugging effect." Another NME editor, Andy Richardson, viewed it as "deft" and "melancholic". Paul Evans from Rolling Stone felt that on 'Tongue', "Stipe's Chi-Lites falsetto is a revelation; elsewhere he declaims with clear authority." Howard Hampton from Spin opined that it's better than its "tearjerking predecessor", and "actually more subtle, even beautiful, it comes off as somehow more overwrought."

== Live performances ==
The three live songs that make up the CD single's B-side were performed on Saturday Night Live in 1994. "Tongue" was performed frequently throughout the tours in support of Monster and Up but would only make three more live appearances ever again in 2003.

On March 1, 1995, drummer Bill Berry had to leave the stage during a performance of this song complaining of a serious headache, which turned out to be caused by a brain aneurysm; it is the likely reason for his leaving the band in October 1997. On subsequent dates Berry admitted that it gave him an eerie feeling every time the band performed "Tongue".

== Track listings ==
All songs were written by Bill Berry, Peter Buck, Mike Mills, and Michael Stipe.

- US 7-inch, CD, and cassette single
1. "Tongue" (album version) – 4:13
2. "Tongue" (live) – 4:34

Note: "Tongue" was recorded live at Detroit, Michigan, on June 7, 1995.

- UK and Japanese CD single
1. "Tongue" – 4:08
2. "What's the Frequency, Kenneth?" (live) – 4:04
3. "Bang and Blame" (live) – 4:52
4. "I Don't Sleep, I Dream" (live) – 3:48

Note: All live tracks were recorded at Saturday Night Live, New York, New York, on November 12, 1994.

- UK cassette and limited-edition 7-inch single
1. "Tongue" (album version) – 4:08
2. "Tongue" (instrumental) – 4:10

Note: The cassette single has a reverse insert where the B-sides from all other singles could be dubbed onto a cassette and the insert flipped to show artwork and track listing for a live album.

== Charts ==
Chart (1995)	Peak position
Europe (Eurochart Hot 100)	54
Ireland (IRMA)	12
Scottish Singles Sales (Official Charts)	10
UK Singles (Official Charts)	13

== Release history ==
Region	Date	Format(s)	Label(s)	Ref.
United Kingdom	July 17, 1995	CD; cassette	Warner Bros.	
Australia	August 21, 1995	CD	Warner Bros.	
Japan	September 25, 1995	CD	Warner Bros.	
United States	October 9, 1995	Alternative radio	Warner Bros.	
United States	October 10, 1995	Contemporary hit radio	Warner Bros.	
