= Perfect square =

A perfect square is an element of algebraic structure that is equal to the square of another element.

- Square number, a perfect square integer.

== Entertainment ==
- Perfect Square, a live recording by the band R.E.M.
- Perfect Square (publisher), a children's imprint label by Viz Media.

== See also ==
- Perfect square dissection, a dissection of a geometric square into smaller squares, all of different sizes
- Perfect square trinomials, a method of factoring polynomials
