= R.E.M.: Singles Collected =

Compilation album by R.E.M.
- Released: September 22, 1994
- Recorded: 1983–1987
- Genre: Alternative rock
- Length: 67:23
- Language: English, French ("Talk About the Passion")
- Label: I.R.S.
- Producer: Joe Boyd, Don Dixon, Don Gehman, Scott Litt, and Mitch Easter

R.E.M. chronology
Monster (1994)	R.E.M.: Singles Collected (1994)	Parallel (1995)

R.E.M. compilations chronology
The Best of R.E.M. (1991)	R.E.M.: Singles Collected (1994)	R.E.M.: In the Attic - Alternative Recordings 1985–1989 (1997)

R.E.M. Singles Collected is a compilation album from R.E.M. released in Europe by I.R.S. Records in 1994. The album includes the A-side and B-sides of singles spanning from their debut LP Murmur in 1983, right through to Document in 1987.

This was the last R.E.M.-related album to be released by I.R.S. Records, which would fold two years after its release.

== Track listing ==
All songs written by Bill Berry, Peter Buck, Mike Mills and Michael Stipe, except where noted:

1. "Radio Free Europe" (Edit) – 3:11
2. "There She Goes Again" (Lou Reed) – 2:50
3. "So. Central Rain" – 3:16
4. "King of the Road" (Roger Miller) – 3:13
5. "(Don't Go Back To) Rockville" (Edit) – 3:54
6. "Catapult" (Live) – 3:55
7. "Cant Get There from Here" (Edit) – 3:13
8. "Bandwagon" (Berry, Buck, Mills, Stipe, and Lynda Stipe) – 2:16
9. "Wendell Gee" – 3:02
10. "Crazy" (Randall Bewley, Vanessa Briscoe, Curtis Crowe, Michael Lachowski) – 3:03
11. "Fall on Me" – 2:50
12. "Rotary Ten" – 2:00
13. "Superman" (Mitch Bottler, Gary Zekley) – 2:52
14. "White Tornado" – 1:55
15. "The One I Love" – 3:16
16. "Maps and Legends" (Live) – 3:15
17. "It's the End of the World as We Know It (And I Feel Fine)" (Edit) – 3:11
18. "Last Date" (Floyd Cramer) – 2:16
19. "Finest Worksong" (Other Mix) – 3:47
20. "Time After Time Etc." (Live, September 14, 1987) (includes parts of "So. Central Rain (I'm Sorry)", and "Red Rain", written by Peter Gabriel) – 8:22

== Sales certifications ==
Organization	Level	Date
BPI – UK	Silver	July 22, 2013
