= Fender Jag-Stang =

Electric guitar

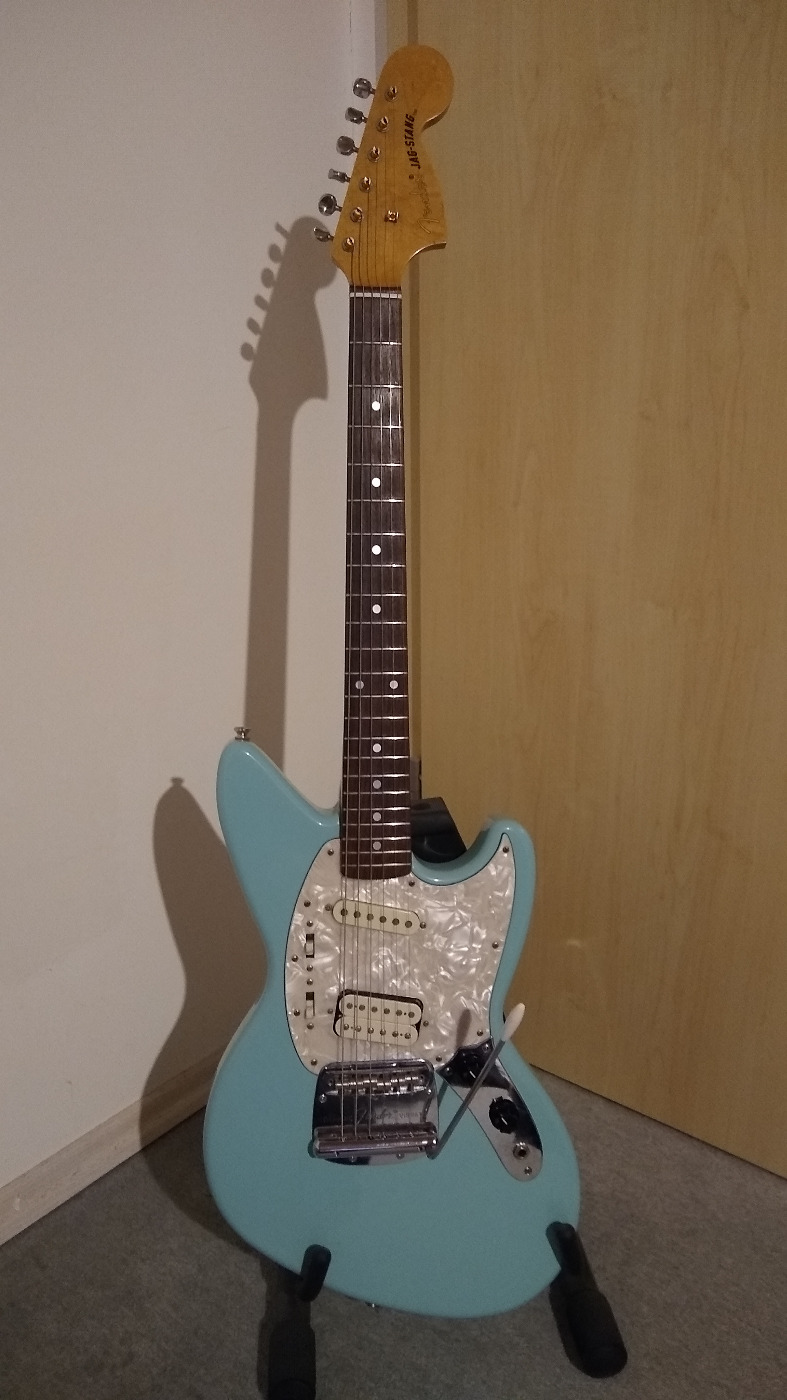
- Manufacturer: Fender
- Period: 1994, 1995–2001, 2003–2005, 2021–present

Construction
- Body type: Solid
- Neck joint: Bolt-on
- Scale: 24 inches (609.6 mm)

Woods
- Body: Basswood or Alder on reissues
- Neck: Maple
- Fretboard: Rosewood

Hardware
- Bridge: Fender Dynamic Vibrato
- Pickup(s): "Vintage style" single coil "Fender Santa Ana" humbucker

Colors available
- Sonic Blue, Fiesta Red

The Fender Jag-Stang is an electric guitar produced by Fender and designed by Nirvana frontman Kurt Cobain. It was intended as a hybrid of two Fender electric guitars models: the Jaguar and the Mustang.

== Origins ==
Cobain suggested his idea for an instrument to Fender, resulting in two left-handed prototypes built by former Custom Shop Master Builder Larry L. Brooks, only one of which was played by Cobain himself. In an interview from January 4, 1994, Cobain talked about designing the Jag-Stang, since it had not yet been produced. He stated to Nardwuar the Human Serviette that he designed it by taking a Polaroid of a Mustang and a Jaguar, cutting them in half and pasting them together. It was shipped back to Fender for repairs before Cobain brought it with him on the European leg of Nirvana's In Utero tour in 1994, where the guitar was seldom played live. Cobain sketched a basic design that was sent to Fender, which was later published as part of his Journals in 2002.

According to Cobain's guitar tech Earnie Bailey, the Jag-stang was played live only a few times; at Nirvana's concert at Tivoli Hall in Ljubljana, Slovenia, he used the Jag-Stang for the entire show. Kurt played the song Dumb with a Jag-Stang, but played the Fender Mustang on almost the entire set. “I’d say he played the Jag-Stang between two and five times on stage,” Bailey says. “There was an early show where he may have used it for a song or two, and later on he may have used it for an entire show.” Bailey says that, to his knowledge, Cobain never recorded with the guitar. “Kurt tended to record with guitars that he liked to play live, guitars he was real comfortable with,” Bailey says, “and at that point the Jag-Stang wasn’t one of them. I believe the guitar showed up not long before the In Utero tour began, and there wasn’t a lot of recording going on then anyway.”

Even though Fender had built the Jag-Stang to Cobain's specs, Bailey modified it as Cobain found things he wanted adjusted. “Basically everything that came in, including the Jag-Stang, I modified,” Bailey says. “Kurt’s older Jaguar was already pretty heavily modded and he liked it pretty much the way it was. But there were always changes of one kind or another to almost everything”.

== Design ==
Cobain's prototype Jag-Stang had a Fender Texas Special pickup at the neck and a DiMarzio H-3 at the bridge. The production Jag-Stang includes a "vintage style" single coil pickup and one "special design" humbucker, each with its own toggle switch which a player can use to switch from "on", "off", or "out-of-phase" settings. It employs the Mustang's "Dynamic Vibrato" bridge and, like both of its predecessors, it has a 24" short scale neck (an exact replica of Cobain's favorite neck, from a Fender Mustang).

Originally produced in 1996, after Kurt Cobain's death, Fender Japan reissued the Jag-Stang two years after its 2001 cancellation due to popular demand. Fender once again discontinued importing the Jag-Stang from Japan as of May 2006. On July 8, 2021, Fender announced that the Jag-Stang would be reissued once again to commemorate the 30th anniversary of Nevermind, and became available to purchase in October 2021. These Jag-Stangs would be made in Mexico for the first time.

== Jag-Stang users ==
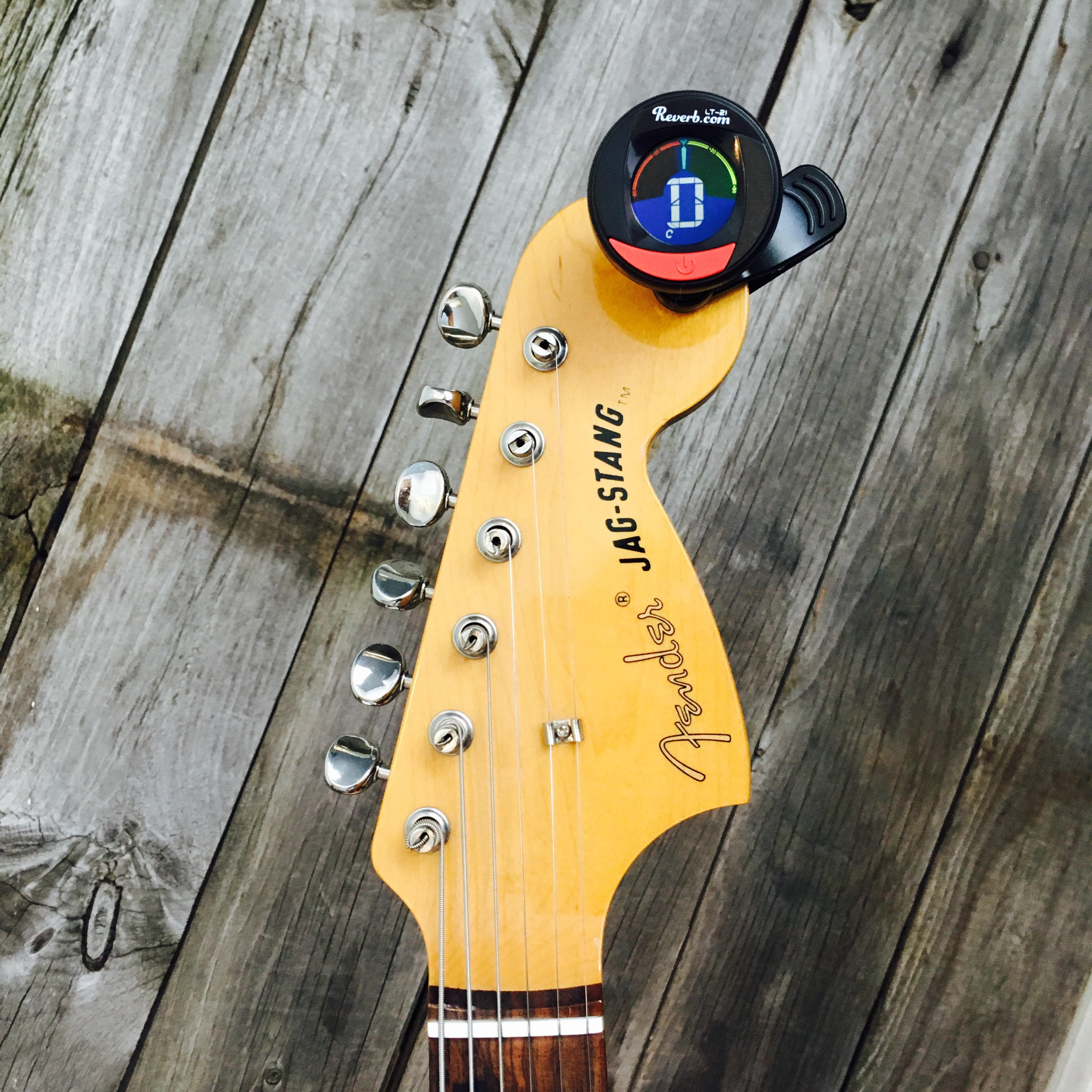
Over-sized 1970s-style head stock on a 1996 Jag-Stang.

Kurt Cobain is the one who recommended the idea to Fender, picking up the "Jag-Stang." Cobain was the first to receive and play the guitar, which also featured a mimic of his favorite guitar neck. He used it on rare occasions. He only used the bridge pickup, a DiMarzio H-8 humbucker, that was replaced by a custom Seymour Duncan pickup (equal to the modern day Seymour Duncan 59 bridge humbucker) at some time. Cobain's Sonic Blue Jag-Stang was given to R.E.M.'s Peter Buck by Courtney Love after Cobain died. He can be seen playing it (modified for right-handed playing) in the "What's the Frequency, Kenneth?" music video. Mike Mills, also from R.E.M., played this same guitar in concert during the song "Let Me In", itself a tribute to Kurt Cobain. An example of this can be seen on their Road Movie DVD. TAS 1000 guitarist, Cass Picken is seen playing a Sonic Blue Jag-Stang at a TAS-A-Thon. Ruban Nielson, of the band Unknown Mortal Orchestra, uses a red Jag-Stang.

Dallon Weekes of I Dont Know How but They Found Me uses a Fender bass that appears to be modeled after the Jag-Stang's body style. Molly Rankin of Alvvays plays a red Jag-Stang. Nicolle Maroulis of indie-pop band Hit Like a Girl uses a custom shell pink Jag-stang. Conor Walls of rock band Turfboy uses a Sonic Blue Jag-Stang. Dylan Borkowski of alternative group Sixth In Line uses a partially disassembled red Jag-Stang. John McCauley of the band Deer Tick has been seen playing a Sonic Blue model, covered with stickers, live. Robert Madriaga from the band Barber Floyd has been seen playing a red custom Jag-Stang.

== See also ==
- Squier Ryan Jarman Signature Guitar
