= The Automatic Box =

Box set by R.E.M.
- Released: December 1993
- Recorded: May 1988 – September 1993
- Genre: Alternative rock
- Length: 63:51
- Label: Warner Bros.
- Producers: Scott Litt and R.E.M.

R.E.M. chronology
Automatic for the People (1992)	The Automatic Box (1993)	Monster (1994)

R.E.M. compilations chronology
The Best of R.E.M. (1991)	The Automatic Box (1993)	R.E.M.: Singles Collected (1994)

The Automatic Box is a four-disc box set by R.E.M., released in Germany in December 1993. It was primarily a collection of B-sides from Automatic for the People, though disc four contains B-sides from Green-era singles (then collected on the 7" vinyl box set Singleactiongreen). "It's a Free World Baby", "Fretless", "Mandolin Strum", and "Organ Song" were outtakes recorded during Out of Time recording sessions. This is part of a Warner Bros. Records series that compiles rarities and b-sides from a specific record, also containing the Red Hot Chili Peppers' Live Rare Remix Box.

== Track listing ==
All tracks written by Bill Berry, Peter Buck, Mike Mills and Michael Stipe except as indicated.

Disc 1 – Vocal tracks

1. "It's a Free World Baby" – 5:11
2. "Fretless" – 4:49
3. "Chance (Dub)" – 2:32
4. "Star Me Kitten" (demo) – 3:04

Disc 2 – Instrumentals

1. "Winged Mammal Theme" – 2:55
2. "Organ Song" – 3:28
3. "Mandolin Strum" – 3:45
4. "Fruity Organ" – 3:26
5. "New Orleans Instrumental No. 2" – 3:48

Disc 3 – Covers

1. "Arms of Love" (Robyn Hitchcock) – 3:35
2. "Dark Globe" (Syd Barrett) – 1:51
3. "The Lion Sleeps Tonight" (Luigi Creatore, Hugo Peretti, George David Weiss) – 2:41
4. "First We Take Manhattan" (Leonard Cohen) – 6:06

Disc 4 – B-sides from Singleactiongreen

1. "Ghost Rider" (Martin Rev, Alan Vega) – 3:44
2. "Funtime" (David Bowie, Iggy Pop) – 2:14
3. "Memphis Train Blues" – 1:38
4. "Pop Song 89" (acoustic) – 3:03
5. "Everybody Hurts" (live at the 1993 MTV Awards) – 4:56
