= Around the Sun =

Studio album by R.E.M.
- Released: October 5, 2004
- Recorded: Early 2003 – early 2004
- Studios: The Warehouse (Vancouver); Compass Point (Nassau); The Hit Factory / Criteria (Miami)
- Genre: Alternative rock
- Length: 55:16
- Label: Warner Bros.
- Producers: Pat McCarthy; R.E.M.

R.E.M. chronology
Perfect Square (2004)	Around the Sun (2004)	And I Feel Fine... The Best of the I.R.S. Years 1982–1987 (2006)

Singles from Around the Sun
- 1. "Leaving New York" Released: September 27, 2004; 2. "Aftermath" Released: November 29, 2004; 3. "Electron Blue" Released: February 28, 2005; 4. "Wanderlust" Released: July 11, 2005

Around the Sun is the thirteenth studio album by American alternative rock band R.E.M., released on October 5, 2004 on Warner Bros. Records. The album was supported by several singles and a world tour. It was commercially successful except in the US but received mixed to negative reviews and is often considered the weakest in the band's catalogue.

== Description ==
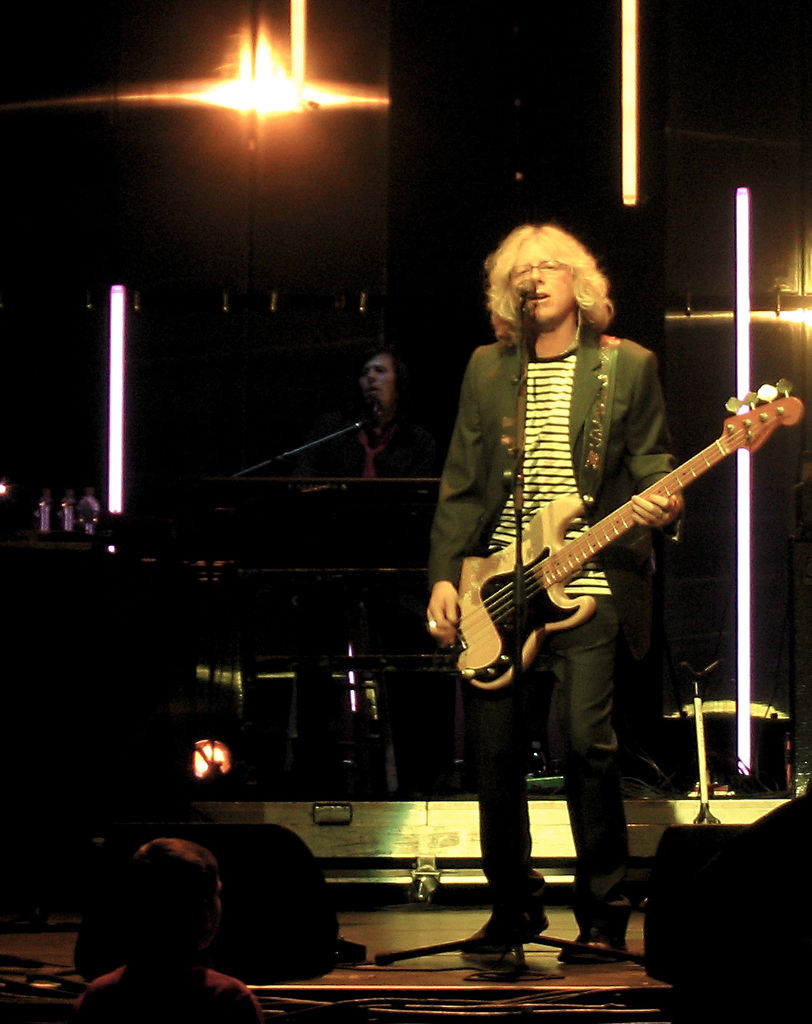
Bassist Mike Mills with touring multi-instrumentalist Ken Stringfellow on the Around the Sun Tour in 2004; the light show was typical of the stage design.

The album was released in four editions: Double vinyl, cassette (the band's final release on the medium), compact disc, and a limited-edition box set with the CD and fold-out posters by 14 artists illustrating the songs.

"The Outsiders" features a guest appearance by rapper Q-Tip. When the song was performed live, Michael Stipe carried out the rap, as he did on a later B-side release of the song.

"Final Straw" is a politically charged song. The version on the album is a remix of the original version, which had been made available as a free download on March 25, 2003, from the band's website. The song was written in protest of the U.S. government's actions in the Iraq War. The song evolved from an instrumental demo titled "Harlan County with Whistling," recorded during the sessions for the band's 1994's album Monster and released with its 25th anniversary edition in 2019.

Around the Sun was the first of only two R.E.M. albums to include a title track (the second being its follow-up, Accelerate). The album was also a first for R.E.M. in that it was their first to feature Bill Rieflin, the band's de facto replacement for former drummer Bill Berry, who had retired in 1997. Although Rieflin was never officially inducted into the band as a member, he would serve as a regular auxiliary musician for R.E.M. until the band's dissolution in 2011.

== Reception ==
Professional ratings
Aggregate scores
Source	Rating
Metacritic	56/100
Review scores
Source	Rating
AllMusic	2/5 stars
Blender	3/5 stars
Entertainment Weekly	B−
The Guardian	2/5 stars
Los Angeles Times	2.5/4 stars
NME	6/10
Pitchfork	5.2/10
Rolling Stone	3/5 stars
Spin	B−
Uncut	4/5 stars

Around the Sun received mixed to negative reviews from critics noted at review aggregator Metacritic. It has a weighted average score of 56 out of 100, based on 27 reviews.

Despite hitting number one in the UK, it became their first studio album to miss the US top 10 (reaching number 13 during seven weeks on the Billboard 200) since 1988's Green. As of March 2007, Around the Sun had sold two million copies worldwide and 232,000 units in the US. This is fewer than R.E.M. sold in the first week of an album's release while at their early to mid-1990s commercial peak.

Lead single "Leaving New York" became a UK top 5 hit, while "Aftermath", "Electron Blue" and "Wanderlust" became minor hits. Around the Sun had no singles success in the United States. It was the band's first studio album to fail to chart a song on the Hot 100 since Fables of the Reconstruction in 1985.

After the release of the following Accelerate, guitarist Peter Buck said Around the Sun "just wasn't really listenable, because it sounds like what it is: a bunch of people that are so bored with the material that they can't stand it anymore." "The songs on Around the Sun are great," remarked singer Michael Stipe. "But, in the process of recording, we lost our focus as a band." Mike Mills concurs: "It's an unfocused record. But the songs are good, because there's a live record from Dublin that came out not long after that, and we did a lot of those songs, and they sound fantastic. It's not on Pat McCarthy, it's on us; we just lost our groove."

Retrospectives of the band's career cite this album as their nadir. In 2023, Rolling Stone marked this as number 44 on their list of 50 horrible albums by brilliant artists, calling all of their post-Bill Berry studio albums "stellar" except for this one.

== Reissue ==
In 2005, Warner Bros. Records issued an expanded two-disc edition of Around the Sun which includes a CD, a DVD-Audio disc containing a 5.1-channel surround sound mix of the album done by Elliot Scheiner, and the original CD booklet with expanded liner notes.

A remix of the song "Final Straw" appeared earlier in 2004 on the compilation album Future Soundtrack for America.

After being out of print for several years, the vinyl LP edition was re-pressed in 2023.

== Track listing ==
All songs written by Peter Buck, Mike Mills and Michael Stipe.

1. "Leaving New York" – 4:49
2. "Electron Blue" – 4:12
3. "The Outsiders" (feat. Q-Tip) – 4:14
4. "Make It All Okay" – 3:44
5. "Final Straw" – 4:07
6. "I Wanted to Be Wrong" – 4:35
7. "Wanderlust" – 3:03
8. "Boy in the Well" – 5:22
9. "Aftermath" – 3:55
10. "High Speed Train" – 5:02
11. "The Worst Joke Ever" – 3:38
12. "The Ascent of Man" – 4:07
13. "Around the Sun" – 4:28

== Personnel ==
R.E.M.

- Peter Buck
- Mike Mills
- Michael Stipe

Additional musicians

- Scott McCaughey
- Ken Stringfellow
- Bill Rieflin
- Jamie Candiloro
- Hahn Rowe
- Q-Tip

Technical personnel

- Patrick McCarthy – producer, mixing
- Peter Buck – producer, mixing
- Mike Mills – producer, mixing
- Michael Stipe – producer, mixing, packaging
- Jamie Candiloro – engineer, mixing
- Chris Bilheimer – packaging
- Oswald "Wiz" Bowe – assistant engineer
- Jim Briggs III – assistant engineer
- DeWitt Burton – technical assistance
- Alex Dixon – assistant
- Bertis Downs – advisor
- Thomas Roman Dozol – photography, cover photo
- Bryan Gallant – assistant
- Ted Jensen – mastering
- Kirk McNally – assistant engineer
- Javier Valverde – assistant engineer
- Bob Whittaker – technical assistance

== Charts ==
=== Weekly charts ===
Weekly chart performance for Around the Sun
Chart (2004–05)	Peak position
Australian Albums (ARIA)	6
Austrian Albums (Ö3 Austria)	1
Belgian Albums (Ultratop Flanders)	5
Belgian Albums (Ultratop Wallonia)	5
Canadian Albums (Billboard)	7
Danish Albums (Hitlisten)	2
Dutch Albums (Album Top 100)	7
Finnish Albums (Suomen virallinen lista)	3
French Albums (SNEP)	9
German Albums (Offizielle Top 100)	1
Hungarian Albums (MAHASZ)	31
Irish Albums (IRMA)	1
Italian Albums (FIMI)	1
New Zealand Albums (RMNZ)	12
Norwegian Albums (VG-lista)	1
Portuguese Albums (AFP)	11
Spanish Albums (PROMUSICAE)	7
Swedish Albums (Sverigetopplistan)	1
Swiss Albums (Schweizer Hitparade)	1
UK Albums (Official Charts)	1
US Billboard 200	13

=== Year-end charts ===
2004 year-end chart performance for Around the Sun
Chart (2004)	Position
Austrian Albums Chart	37
Belgian Albums Chart (Flanders)	47
Belgian Albums Chart (Wallonia)	71
Dutch Albums Chart	83
Swedish Albums Chart	19
Swiss Albums Chart	17
UK Albums Chart	83

== Certifications ==
Certifications for Around the Sun
Region	Certification	Certified units/sales
Australia (ARIA)	Gold	35,000^{^}
Austria (IFPI Austria)	Gold	15,000^{*}
Denmark (IFPI Danmark)	Gold	20,000^{^}
Germany (BVMI)	Gold	100,000^{^}
Italy (FIMI)	2× Platinum	200,000^{*}
Sweden (GLF)	Gold	30,000^{^}
Switzerland (IFPI Switzerland)	Platinum	40,000^{^}
United Kingdom (BPI)	Gold	100,000^{^}
Summaries
Europe (IFPI)	Platinum	1,000,000^{*}
^{*} Sales figures based on certification alone.^{^} Shipments figures based on certification alone.
