= Wanderlust (R.E.M. song) =

2005 song by R.E.M.

Single by R.E.M.

from the album Around the Sun
- B-side: "The Outsiders"
- Released: July 11, 2005
- Length: 3:03
- Label: Warner Bros.
- Songwriter(s): Peter Buck; Mike Mills; Michael Stipe
- Producer(s): Pat McCarthy; R.E.M.

R.E.M. singles chronology
"Electron Blue" (2005)	"Wanderlust" (2005)	"#9 Dream" (2007)

"Wanderlust" is a song by American rock band R.E.M. It was released as their fourth and final single from their 13th studio album, Around the Sun (2004), peaking at number 27 in the United Kingdom (becoming their last of 31 top-40 hits there) and number 48 in Ireland. The song has a partially compound time signature; 4/4 during the verses and 7/4 during the chorus.

A version of the song called "Wanderlust (Clayton St. Studio version)" was released as a digital download only and later added in the compilation AthFest 10.

== Track listings ==
All tracks were written by Peter Buck, Mike Mills, and Michael Stipe unless otherwise stated.

7-inch (W676)

1. "Wanderlust"
2. "The Outsiders" (feat. Q-Tip)

CD 1 (W676CD1)

1. "Wanderlust"
2. "Low" (Alternate Version) (Berry, Buck, Mills, Stipe)

CD 2 (W676CD2)

1. "Wanderlust"
2. "The Outsiders" (Alternate Version)
3. "Bad Day" (Live Video, Zaragoza, 28.05.05)^{1}

^{1} Recorded at Recinto Ferial de la Feria de Muestras in Zaragoza, Spain; May 28, 2005.

Digital download

1. "Wanderlust"
2. "Wanderlust" (Live, Santa Barbara, CA, 14.10.04)

== Charts ==
Chart (2005)	Peak position
Ireland (IRMA)	48
Scotland (OCC)	21
UK Singles (OCC)	27
