= R.E.M.: In the Attic – Alternative Recordings 1985–1989 =

R.E.M. In the Attic – Alternative Recordings 1985–1989

Compilation album by R.E.M.
- Released: October 7, 1997
- Recorded: 1984–1987
- Genre: Alternative rock
- Length: 51:10
- Language: English
- Label: EMI-Capitol/I.R.S.
- Producer: Joe Boyd, Don Dixon, Don Gehman, Scott Litt, and Mitch Easter

R.E.M. chronology
Road Movie (1996)	R.E.M. In the Attic – Alternative Recordings 1985–1989 (1997)	Up (1998)

R.E.M. compilations chronology
R.E.M.: Singles Collected (1994)	R.E.M. In the Attic – Alternative Recordings 1985–1989 (1997)	In Time: The Best of R.E.M. 1988–2003 (2003)

Professional ratings
Review scores
Source	Rating
Allmusic	2.5/5 stars
The Encyclopedia of Popular Music	3/5 stars
Pitchfork Media	8.8/10

R.E.M. In the Attic – Alternative Recordings 1985–1989 was the fourth R.E.M. compilation released by I.R.S. Records. EMI-Capitol, which acquired the entire I.R.S. Records catalogue upon the label's failure in 1996, released In the Attic in 1997 without the permission of R.E.M. The album failed to chart in the UK, and only reached #185 in the U.S. in its sole week on the chart. Most of the songs had appeared on the European reissues of the band's IRS albums, but this was their first official release in the U.S. There are two exceptions: "Gardening at Night" (Different Vocal Mix), which was on Eponymous, and "Cant Get There From Here" (Radio Edit), which was on Singles Collected, both compilations having been released in the U.S. Although they were also I.R.S. Years bonus tracks, "Crazy" and "Toys in the Attic" had also appeared on the band's b-sides compilation album Dead Letter Office.

The final track, "Time After Time, Etc." was a live medley from 1987 in which R.E.M. started out by playing "Time After Time (AnnElise)", the fifth track from Reckoning, then began playing Peter Gabriel's "Red Rain", followed by "So. Central Rain (I'm Sorry)", before finishing off with a verse from "Red Rain".

Despite the title limiting it to recordings from between 1985 and 1989, there is a live version of "Driver 8" from 1984. The album was released in 1997, but the album cover says "Limited Edition – 1998" and several of the song durations listed inside the album cover are inaccurate.

== Track listing ==
All songs written by Bill Berry, Peter Buck, Mike Mills, and Michael Stipe unless noted otherwise.

1. "Finest Worksong" (Other Mix) – 3:48
2. "Driver 8" (Live, June 27, 1984) – 3:18
3. "Gardening at Night" (Different Vocal Mix) – 3:31
4. "Swan Swan H" (Acoustic) – 2:42
5. "Disturbance at the Heron House" (Live acoustic, May 24, 1987) – 3:25
6. "Maps and Legends" (Live acoustic, May 24, 1987) – 3:14
7. "Tired of Singing Trouble" – 1:00
8. "Just a Touch" (Live in the Studio) – 2:38
9. "Toys in the Attic" (Joe Perry, Steven Tyler) – 2:26
10. "Dream (All I Have To Do)" (Felice and Boudleaux Bryant) – 2:40
11. "The One I Love" (Live acoustic, May 24, 1987) – 4:19
12. "Crazy" (Randall Bewley, Vanessa Briscoe, Curtis Crowe, Michael Lachowski) – 3:03
13. "Cant Get There from Here" (Radio Edit) – 3:10
14. "Last Date" (Floyd Cramer) – 2:13

Bonus track included on limited edition

15. "Time After Time Etc." (Live, September 14, 1987) (includes parts of "So. Central Rain (I'm Sorry)", and "Red Rain", written by Peter Gabriel) – 8:21
