= Animal (R.E.M. song) =

2004 single by R.E.M

Single by R.E.M.

from the album In Time: The Best of R.E.M. 1988–2003
- B-side: "Pretty Persuasion" (live)
- Released: January 5, 2004
- Length: 4:02
- Label: Warner Bros.
- Songwriters: Peter Buck; Mike Mills; Michael Stipe
- Producers: Pat McCarthy; R.E.M.

R.E.M. singles chronology
"Bad Day" (2003)	"Animal" (2004)	"Leaving New York" (2004)

"Animal" is a single released by American rock band R.E.M. It was one of two new songs recorded for the band's Warner Bros. Records compilation album, In Time: The Best of R.E.M. 1988–2003 (the other being "Bad Day"), and was released as a single in support of the album.

The video for "Animal" stars lead singer Michael Stipe and shows an artist's conception of the idea of a solar eclipse allowing energy of all forms, including emotions between people, to be seen as visual light. The music video was not included on In View: The Best of R.E.M. 1988–2003, the DVD supporting In Time, as it had not been filmed until after its release.

== Track listing ==
All songs by Bill Berry, Peter Buck, Mike Mills, and Michael Stipe unless otherwise stated.

Cat. No. W633CD 9362427062

1. "Animal" (New Mix) (Buck, Mills, Stipe)
2. "Pretty Persuasion" (Live, New York, NY, 07.10.03)
3. "Losing My Religion" (Live video from Perfect Square)

Cat. No. 5439164892

1. "Animal" (New Mix)
2. "So. Central Rain (I'm Sorry)" (Live, Los Angeles, CA, 09.09.03)

Cat. No. 9362426992

1. "Animal" (New Mix)
2. "Pretty Persuasion" (Live, New York, NY, 07.10.03)
3. "Welcome To The Occupation" (Live, New York, NY, 07.10.03)

Notes: "Pretty Persuasion" and "Welcome to the Occupation" recorded at Clinton Studios, NYC on October 7, 2003.

"So. Central Rain" recorded for "In Studio with Nic Harcourt", Los Angeles on September 9, 2003.

== Charts ==
Chart (2004)	Peak position
Australia (ARIA)	93
Greece (IFPI)	35
Ireland (IRMA)	30
Italy (FIMI)	20
Scotland Singles (OCC)	35
UK Singles (OCC)	33

== Release history ==
Region	Date	Format(s)	Label(s)	Ref.
United Kingdom	January 5, 2004	CD	Warner Bros.	
Australia	February 23, 2004	CD	Warner Bros.	
