= Star 69 (R.E.M. song) =

1994 promotional single by R.E.M

- Spain promotional release

Promotional single by R.E.M.

from the album Monster
- Released: 1994
- Genre: Garage rock; glam punk; grunge
- Length: 3:07
- Label: Warner Bros.
- Songwriter(s): Bill Berry; Peter Buck; Mike Mills; Michael Stipe
- Producer(s): Scott Litt; R.E.M.

R.E.M. singles chronology
"What's the Frequency, Kenneth?" (1993)	"Star 69" (1994)	"Bang and Blame" (1994)

"Star 69" is a song from American rock band R.E.M.'s ninth album, Monster (1994). The song was not released as an official single but still reached No. 74 on the US Billboard Hot 100 Airplay chart.

== Critical reception ==
Rob Jones of The Delete Bin called the track a "return-to-roots glam punk anthem". Chuck Campbell from Knoxville News Sentinel felt that Michael Stipe's "echoing vocals swarm out of the churning punk vivacity" of "Star 69". Keith Cameron from NME wrote that it "breezes through a mystery tale of celebrity obsession (possibly) like a rough cast cousin of "Pop Song 89", and is absolutely fine."

== Background ==
The song is named after the access number for the last-call return feature of telephones in North America, as indicated by its chorus:

"I know you called
I know you called
I know you hung up my line

Star 69"

Of all of the songs on Monster, "Star 69" is the one that evolved most from its initial demo. It started out at six minutes long before having its bridge excised and its original chorus discarded.

"Star 69" was frequently played live throughout the tours in support of Monster and the band's 1998 release Up but was only played sporadically on subsequent tours.

== Charts ==
Chart (1995)	Peak position
Canada Top Singles (RPM)	73
US Hot 100 Airplay (Billboard)	74
US Mainstream Rock Tracks (Billboard)	15
US Modern Rock Tracks (Billboard)	8
