= Aftermath (R.E.M. song) =

Song by R.E.M.

Single by R.E.M.

from the album Around the Sun
- Released: November 29, 2004
- Length: 3:53
- Label: Warner Bros.
- Songwriter(s): Peter Buck; Mike Mills; Michael Stipe
- Producer(s): Pat McCarthy; R.E.M.

R.E.M. singles chronology
"Leaving New York" (2004)	"Aftermath" (2004)	"Electron Blue" (2005)

"Aftermath" is a song by American alternative rock band R.E.M. It was released as the second single from their 13th studio album, Around the Sun (2004), on November 29, 2004.

Upon it release, "Aftermath" peaked at number 41 on the UK Singles Chart. The single also charted in the Netherlands and Sweden, peaking at numbers 44 and 59, respectively. Its music video, directed by Blue Leach and Peter Care, was filmed in several locations, including the Hyatt Regency Hotel in San Francisco and the London Eye.

== Track listing ==
- UK CD1
1. "Aftermath" – 3:53
2. "High Speed Train" (live in Athens, GA – rehearsals, 2004) – 4:59
- UK CD2
1. "Aftermath"
2. "So Fast, So Numb" (live in Athens, GA – rehearsals, 2004)
3. "All the Right Friends" (live in Athens, GA – rehearsals, 2004)

== Charts ==
Chart (2004)	Peak position
Germany (GfK)	78
Netherlands (Single Top 100)	44
Sweden (Sverigetopplistan)	59
UK Singles (OCC)	41
US Adult Alternative Songs (Billboard)	15

== Release history ==
Region	Date	Format	Label	Ref.
United Kingdom	November 29, 2004	CD	Warner Bros.	
United States	December 6, 2004	Triple A radio	Warner Bros.	
