= Wendell Gee =

1985 single by R.E.M.

Single by R.E.M.

from the album Fables of the Reconstruction
- B-side: "Crazy"
- Released: September 1985
- Recorded: 1985
- Studio: Livingston (London)
- Genre: Folk rock
- Length: 3:00
- Label: I.R.S.
- Songwriters: Bill Berry; Peter Buck; Mike Mills; Michael Stipe
- Producer: Joe Boyd

R.E.M. singles chronology
"Driver 8" (1985)	"Wendell Gee" (1985)	"Fall on Me" (1986)

"Wendell Gee" is a song by the American alternative rock band R.E.M. that was released as the third and final single from the group's third studio album Fables of the Reconstruction in 1985. It was released in Europe only, in two 7" and two 12" formats.

Instrumentally, the song was almost entirely composed by Mike Mills, with Michael Stipe supplying the lyric and vocal (Mills' backing vocal is "Gonna miss you, boy"). Peter Buck hated the song when it was initially recorded, claiming its only redeeming feature was his banjo solo, and it was only included on the album at the last minute. With Buck's objections being such, the song was very rarely played live, even on the European leg of the Reconstruction tour where it had been released as a single. Buck has since revised his view of the song.

The subject of the song died just after R.E.M. completed their 1995 world tour in support of the previous year's Monster. He was 69.

== Track listings ==
All songs written by Bill Berry, Peter Buck, Mike Mills and Michael Stipe unless otherwise indicated.

7"

1. "Wendell Gee" – 3:02
2. "Crazy" (Pylon) – 3:05

7" double pack and 12" – Holland

1. "Wendell Gee" – 3:02
2. "Crazy" (Pylon) – 3:05
3. "Ages of You" – 3:44
4. "Burning Down" – 4:13

12" – UK

1. "Wendell Gee" – 3:02
2. "Crazy" (Pylon) – 3:05
3. "Driver 8" (live)^{1} – 3:30

=== Notes ===
^{1} Recorded at the Music Hall, Seattle, Washington; June 27, 1984.
