= Strange Currencies =

1995 single by R.E.M.

Single by R.E.M.

from the album Monster
- B-side: "Strange Currencies" (instrumental version)
- Released: April 3, 1995
- Genre: Alternative rock; soul
- Length: 3:52
- Label: Warner Bros.
- Songwriters: Bill Berry; Peter Buck; Mike Mills; Michael Stipe
- Producers: Scott Litt; R.E.M.

R.E.M. singles chronology
"Crush with Eyeliner" (1995)	"Strange Currencies" (1995)	"Tongue" (1995)

Music video
- "Strange Currencies" on YouTube

"Strange Currencies" is a song by American rock band R.E.M. It was included on their ninth studio album, Monster (1994), and was released as the album's fourth single on April 18, 1995, by Warner Bros. Records. The song reached number nine on the UK Singles Chart and peaked at number 47 in the United States. Like "Everybody Hurts" on R.E.M.'s previous album, it has a time signature of 6/8. The song's music video was directed by Mark Romanek.

== Composition ==
In talking about the song with Uncut in 2003, guitarist Peter Buck stated that all songs on Monster, including "Strange Currencies", were "about peeping and stalkers". Michael Stipe followed up by saying:

For me, Monster was a sonic experiment. I really wanted to experiment with my voice and different textures and push the really grainy, bassy, ugly sounds as far as we could. And yeah, the lyrics match that. They're kind of gross and disgusting! But it was obvious that I was role-playing.

Stipe would later say that the song is about "when somebody actually thinks that, through words, they're going to be able to convince somebody that they are their one and only."

According to Stipe, the song was inspired, in part, by Michael Hutchence, the late lead singer and lyricist of the Australian rock band INXS. He told Clash that Hutchence was a “ "big influence. Not just on myself but on Bono. I met Michael through [the U2 lead singer]." "He raised the bar for both myself and Bono," Stipe explained to The Guardian in 2018. "The middle eight of ["Strange Currencies"] is completely taken from INXS and from Michael." The song was one of eight R.E.M. songs he shared with The Guardian that he considered to be his favorites.

It almost did not make it onto the album due to its rhythmic similarities to "Everybody Hurts." Yet, the band felt Stipe's melody was too good to pass over, so the original rhythm was slightly reworked.

== Critical reception ==
Steve Baltin from Cash Box named "Strange Currencies" "maybe the sweetest song" from the Monster album. He explained, "There's a simple longing, mixed with reassuring, in the way Michael Stipe sings "I tripped and fell/did I fall/what I want to feel I want to feel it now." A sparse but lovely melody accompanies Stipe's tour de force. [...] Of course it will be a smash at the usual outlets, it's R.E.M.; but look for this one to break out at Top 40 and maybe even at Adult/Contemporary." Chuck Campbell from Knoxville News Sentinel said it's the song "with perhaps the most enduring appeal" on the album, declaring it as "a languid track on which Stipe explores the enigma of a would-be lover with alternating fits of determination and vulnerability." Jennifer Nine from Melody Maker complimented it as "buoyant". Another Melody Maker editor, Andrew Mueller, wrote that it "puts the accompaniment to 'Everybody Hurts' through a cheap and brutal amplifier and replaces universal balm with the self-abasing heroics of the unrequited admirer. "Fool might be my middle name", he sings, gloriously, uselessly besotted, "I tripped and I fell...you will be mine". Ah, the pathos, the hopeless deluded joy of it all. Lovely." Barbara Ellen from NME said, "Like Morrissey, Michael Stipe is an expert on the agonies of obsessive, unrequited love. [...] The lyrics of 'Strange Currencies' are among his most deceptively simple and potent yet, encapsulating all the need, hope and dread of a painful, secret crush". Roy Wilkinson from Select noted how Stipe "wanting to turn you on". Howard Hampton from Spin felt it's better than its "tearjerking predecessor", "Everybody Hurts", describing it as a "tremulous, pledging-my-soul" track.

== Music video ==
The accompanying music video for "Strange Currencies", directed by Mark Romanek, was shot on the first anniversary of the death of Michael Stipe's close friend River Phoenix and features Phoenix's last girlfriend, actress Samantha Mathis. It also features an early performance by actor and model Norman Reedus. It is in black and white, and shows the band playing in an industrial area. The images of the band are interspersed with other shots, some of which, such as a child playing with a dead bird, suggest urban decay.

A second music video for a remix that incorporates live footage from Road Movie and the second season of The Bear was released on June 27, 2023. A lyric video for the Monster 25th anniversary remix was published on July 20, 2023.

== Live performances ==
"Strange Currencies" was played live frequently throughout the Monster tour but was not performed live again until 2003, when the song would then only appear on and off throughout various set lists until their final tour in 2008.

== Track listings ==
- US CD and cassette single, UK 7-inch and cassette single
1. "Strange Currencies" (album version) – 3:52
2. "Strange Currencies" (instrumental version) – 3:52
- UK maxi-CD and 12-inch single, UK and Australian CD single
1. "Strange Currencies" – 3:52
2. "Drive" (live) – 4:17 (4:10 in UK)
3. "Funtime" (live) – 2:16 (2:20 in UK)
4. "Radio Free Europe" (live) – 4:43

Note: All live tracks were recorded at the 40 Watt Club in Athens, Georgia, on November 19, 1992. The performance, a benefit for Greenpeace, was recorded on a solar-powered mobile studio.

- 2023 digital edition, released to coincide with the second season of The Bear
1. "Strange Currencies" (25th anniversary remix by Scott Litt) – 3:52
2. "Strange Currencies" – 3:52
3. "Strange Currencies" (Live version from Road Movie) – 4:13

== Charts ==
=== Weekly charts ===
Chart (1995)	Peak position
Australia (ARIA)	100
Canada Top Singles (RPM)	13
Europe (Eurochart Hot 100)	34
Europe (European Hit Radio)	19
Iceland (Íslenski Listinn Topp 40)	3
Ireland (IRMA)	26
Netherlands (Dutch Top 40 Tipparade)	13
Netherlands (Single Top 100)	41
Scottish Singles Sales (Official Charts)	9
UK Singles (Official Charts)	9
US Billboard Hot 100	47
US Alternative Airplay (Billboard)	14
US Mainstream Rock (Billboard)	8
US Pop Airplay (Billboard)	30

=== Year-end charts ===
Chart (1995)	Position
Canada Top Singles (RPM)	82
Iceland (Íslenski Listinn Topp 40)	47
UK Airplay (Music Week)	49

== Release history ==
Region	Date	Format(s)	Label(s)	Ref.
United Kingdom	April 3, 1995	7-inch vinyl; CD; cassette	Warner Bros.	
United States	April 11, 1995	Contemporary hit radio	Warner Bros.	
Australia	May 1, 1995	CD	Warner Bros.	
Japan	May 25, 1995	CD	Warner Bros.	
Worldwide	June 24, 2023	Music streaming	Warner Bros.	

== See also ==
- Music of The Bear (TV series) § "Strange Currencies"
