= The Best of R.E.M. =

Greatest hits album by R.E.M.
- Released: September 30, 1991
- Recorded: 1982–1987
- Genre: Alternative rock
- Length: 59:17
- Label: I.R.S.
- Producer: Mitch Easter; Don Dixon; Joe Boyd; Don Gehman; Scott Litt; R.E.M.

R.E.M. chronology
This Film Is On (1991)	The Best of R.E.M. (1991)	Automatic for the People (1992)

R.E.M. compilations chronology
Eponymous (1988)	The Best of R.E.M. (1991)	The Automatic Box (1993)

The Best of R.E.M. is a greatest hits album by R.E.M. released in 1991, shortly after the success of the band's seventh studio album, Out of Time, released by Warner Bros. The Best of R.E.M., however, was released by the band's previous record label, I.R.S. Records, and only includes tracks from their first five albums while the group was with that label. As such, it covers their output from 1982 to 1987.

The Best of R.E.M. was only issued in Europe, New Zealand, Australia, Brazil and Chile, complete with liner notes from Remarks: The Story of R.E.M. by Tony Fletcher. It was not the first compilation to cover this era, and featured all but two of the songs that had already been included on an earlier greatest hits album titled Eponymous (albeit some were different versions).

Three songs were taken from each of the first five studio albums and one song was taken from Chronic Town, the band's first EP, making a total of sixteen songs on the album.

== Critical reception ==
Professional ratings
Review scores
Source	Rating
The Encyclopedia of Popular Music	5/5 stars

"A considerable improvement on the useful but haphazard Eponymous collection," wrote Dan Maier in a 5/5 review for Select. "It'll be a few years before Warners release their own 'Best Of'. In the meantime, this'll do very nicely indeed."

== Track listing ==
All tracks written by Bill Berry, Peter Buck, Mike Mills, Michael Stipe.

1. "Carnival of Sorts (Box Cars)" (from Chronic Town) – 3:51
2. "Radio Free Europe" (from Murmur) – 4:03
3. "Perfect Circle" (from Murmur) – 3:23
4. "Talk About the Passion" (from Murmur) – 3:22
5. "So. Central Rain (I'm Sorry)" (from Reckoning) – 3:11
6. "(Don't Go Back To) Rockville" (from Reckoning) – 4:34
7. "Pretty Persuasion" (from Reckoning) – 3:53
8. "Green Grow the Rushes" (from Fables of the Reconstruction) – 3:42
9. "Cant Get There from Here" (from Fables of the Reconstruction) – 4:10
10. "Driver 8" (from Fables of the Reconstruction) – 3:18
11. "Fall On Me" (from Lifes Rich Pageant) – 2:49
12. "I Believe" (from Lifes Rich Pageant) – 3:32
13. "Cuyahoga" (from Lifes Rich Pageant) – 4:17
14. "The One I Love" (from Document) – 3:17
15. "Finest Worksong" (from Document) – 3:48
16. "It's the End of the World as We Know It (And I Feel Fine)" (from Document) – 4:07

== Certifications ==
Region	Certification	Certified units/sales
Germany (BVMI)	Gold	250,000^{^}
United Kingdom (BPI)	Gold	100,000^{*}
^{*} Sales figures based on certification alone.^{^} Shipments figures based on certification alone.
