= James Herbert (director) =

American music video and film director

- Born: 1938 (age 87–88); Boston, Massachusetts, U.S.
- Education: Dartmouth College (BA); University of Colorado Boulder (MA)
- Occupations: Painter, filmmaker, art professor
- Known for: Music videos for R.E.M.

James Herbert (born 1938) is an American painter and filmmaker known for directing a series of music videos for the band R.E.M. He has also made over forty short films, including John Five (1992) and Jumbo Aqua (2001), and directed four independent features: Scars (1997), Speedy Boys (1998), Rabbit Pix (2005) and Abandoned House (2007). Some of his short films have been collected on the video compilation Figures (1990).

== Biography ==
Herbert was born in Boston, Massachusetts. He received his BA at Dartmouth College and his MFA at the University of Colorado in 1962. After graduation, Herbert moved to Georgia and joined the faculty of the art department at the University of Georgia.

He studied with the abstract expressionist painter Clyfford Still and the experimental filmmaker Stan Brakhage.

He has received several awards, including an Adolph Gottlieb Foundation grant, two grants from the John Simon Guggenheim Foundation, a National Endowment for the Arts senior fellowship, a Lewis Comfort Tiffany grant, and a McDowell Colony fellowship.

Herbert was R.E.M. frontman Michael Stipe's art professor when he studied at the University of Georgia. Stipe greatly admired Herbert's films, and in addition to having him direct R.E.M.'s earliest music videos, he later cited Herbert as a significant influence on him individually and artistically.

== Music video filmography ==
- "Celebration", Kool & the Gang (1980)
- "Wolves, Lower" (live), R.E.M. (1982)
- "Carnival", Limbo District (1983; 12-minute film featuring four songs: "Those Devil Eyes", "A la maison", "Rhythm Forward", and "Daydreaming")
- Left of Reckoning, R.E.M. (1984; 20-minute short film)
- "Pretty Persuasion", R.E.M. (1984; segment from Left of Reckoning, excerpted as a standalone promo for play on MTV and music programs)
- "Green Grow the Rushes", R.E.M. (1985)
- "Driver 8", R.E.M. (1985; co-directed with Michael Stipe)
- "Life and How to Live It", R.E.M. (1985; editor(ial advisor) Jackie Slayton is often credited as co-director)
- "Feeling Gravity's Pull", R.E.M. (1985; editor(ial advisor) Jackie Slayton is often credited as co-director)
- "It's the End of the World as We Know It (And I Feel Fine)", R.E.M. (1987)
- "The First Fish to Walk on Land", dance film collaboration with Elle Udaykee Trapkin and music by Allen Welty-Green (1988)
- "Turn You Inside-Out", R.E.M. (1989)
- "Low", R.E.M. (1991)
- "Revolution Earth", The B-52's (1991)
- "Fish and Boots" (1995; interstitial footage between music videos on R.E.M.'s video compilation Parallel, excerpted from R.E.M. 1995 tour films)
- "All the Best", R.E.M. (2011)

== Bibliography ==
- James Herbert: "Stills" Santa Fe, NM: Twin Palms, 1992. ISBN 0-944092-19-5
- "Body Language" (interview conducted by Stephen Gallagher) in: "Filmmaker" (February 1999), pp. 59, 109
