= Roy Wilkinson =

British journalist

Roy Wilkinson is a British music journalist and band manager.

As a journalist he is best known for his work in Sounds, Select and Q, but has contributed to various other publications. Considered an authority on the Pixies, he appears in their 2002 documentary Gouge, available on the 2004 Pixies DVD. He also appeared in a 1998 BBC Scotland documentary about Belle and Sebastian. With NME journalist Keith Cameron, he started the Costermonger record label, on which the pair released records by bands including Gene. Until November 2005, he managed British Sea Power, a band which includes his younger brothers Jan and Hamilton.

Wilkinson's book Do It For Your Mum, a biography of British Sea Power and a memoir of his family, was published in 2011.
