= Leaving New York =

2004 single by R.E.M.

Single by R.E.M.

from the album Around the Sun
- B-side: "(Don't Go Back To) Rockville" (live)
- Released: September 27, 2004
- Length: 4:49
- Label: Warner Bros.
- Songwriters: Peter Buck; Mike Mills; Michael Stipe
- Producers: R.E.M.; Pat McCarthy

R.E.M. singles chronology
| "Animal" (2004) | "Leaving New York" (2004) | "Aftermath" (2005) |

Music video
- "Leaving New York" on YouTube

"Leaving New York" is a song by American alternative rock band R.E.M. It was released as the lead single from the band's 13th studio album, Around the Sun (2004). Although it was not as heavily promoted as earlier singles, it reached number five on the UK Singles Chart, becoming their 11th and final top-10 hit there. However, the song failed to chart on the Billboard Hot 100, becoming the only lead US single from an R.E.M. studio album not to chart on the US Hot 100 besides "Cant Get There from Here" from Fables of the Reconstruction in 1985.

In early live performances of the song (September 2004), the band would play Michael Stipe's "It's pulling me apart. Change." album backing vocal during the chorus and bridge of live performances. As early as February 2005, however, as evidenced on the R.E.M. Live disc, the band worked up an alternative whereby the backing vocals would be shared amongst Mike Mills, Scott McCaughey and Ken Stringfellow in order to make the song flow more smoothly.

== Track listings ==
All tracks were written by Peter Buck, Mike Mills, and Michael Stipe unless otherwise stated.

UK CD1

1. "Leaving New York" – 4:44
2. "(Don't Go Back To) Rockville" (live, Oslo, Norway, October 25, 2003; Berry, Buck, Mills, Stipe) – 4:35

UK CD2

1. "Leaving New York" – 4:49
2. "You Are the Everything" (live, Raleigh, North Carolina – Soundcheck, October 10, 2003; Berry, Buck, Mills, Stipe) – 3:30
3. "These Days" (live, Toronto, Ontario, September 30, 2003; Berry, Buck, Mills, Stipe) – 3:27

== Charts ==
=== Weekly charts ===
Weekly chart performance for "Leaving New York"
| Chart (2004–2005) | Peak position |
|---|---|
| Australia (ARIA) | 57 |
| Austria (Ö3 Austria Top 40) | 32 |
| Belgium (Ultratip Bubbling Under Flanders) | 7 |
| Belgium (Ultratip Bubbling Under Wallonia) | 15 |
| Canada Rock Top 30 (Radio & Records) | 19 |
| Croatia (HRT) | 5 |
| Denmark (Tracklisten) | 10 |
| Europe (Eurochart Hot 100) | 4 |
| Germany (GfK) | 16 |
| Greece (IFPI) | 19 |
| Hungary (Rádiós Top 40) | 3 |
| Ireland (IRMA) | 14 |
| Italy (FIMI) | 2 |
| Netherlands (Dutch Tipparade 40) | 13 |
| Netherlands (Single Top 100) | 43 |
| Norway (VG-lista) | 7 |
| Romania (Romanian Top 100) | 60 |
| Scotland Singles (Official Charts) | 7 |
| Spain (Promusicae) | 4 |
| Sweden (Sverigetopplistan) | 11 |
| Switzerland (Schweizer Hitparade) | 18 |
| UK Singles (Official Charts) | 5 |
| US Adult Alternative Airplay (Billboard) | 1 |

=== Year-end charts ===
Year-end chart performance for "Leaving New York"
| Chart (2004) | Position |
|---|---|
| Italy (FIMI) | 49 |
| US Triple-A (Billboard) | 12 |

== Release history ==
Release dates and formats for "Leaving New York"
| Region | Date | Format(s) | Label(s) | Ref. |
|---|---|---|---|---|
| United States | August 23, 2004 | Hot adult contemporary; triple A radio | Warner Bros. | |
| United Kingdom | September 27, 2004 | CD | Warner Bros. | |
| Australia | October 4, 2004 | CD | Warner Bros. | |
