= Bad Day (R.E.M. song) =

2003 single by R.E.M

Single by R.E.M.

from the album In Time: The Best of R.E.M. 1988–2003
- B-side: "Favorite Writer"; "Out in the Country"; "Adagio"
- Released: September 15, 2003
- Recorded: 2003
- Genre: Alternative rock, college rock
- Length: 4:07
- Label: Warner Bros.
- Songwriters: Bill Berry; Peter Buck; Mike Mills; Michael Stipe
- Producers: Pat McCarthy; R.E.M.

R.E.M. singles chronology
"I'll Take the Rain" (2001)	"Bad Day" (2003)	"Animal" (2004)

Music video
- "Bad Day" on YouTube

"Bad Day" is a song recorded by American alternative rock band R.E.M. It is one of two previously unreleased songs from their 2003 compilation album, In Time: The Best of R.E.M. 1988–2003, and was released as the album's lead single on September 15, 2003.

An outtake version of the song originally recorded for Lifes Rich Pageant finally appeared on EMI's 2006 compilation And I Feel Fine... The Best of the I.R.S. Years 1982–1987. A demo version from the same sessions appeared on the 25th Anniversary Edition of Lifes Rich Pageant in 2011. The arrangement of the song is slightly different in each version.

== Background and composition ==
"Bad Day" is an anti-media rant which was inspired by a day when Michael Stipe opened his front door and found a camcorder lens in his face. The lyrics also reference the policies of U.S. President Ronald Reagan, as the song was originally written in the 1980s during his administration. Stipe sang a few words of it during a concert in Albany, New York in 1985, as part of the Reconstruction Tour. Around the time of Lifes Rich Pageant, the song emerged in a more polished version with the title "PSA"—an abbreviation for "public service announcement".

The song was never released but did serve as a sort of forerunner to "It's the End of the World as We Know It (And I Feel Fine)", a song with a similar cadence and delivery. In 2003, Stipe saw that the song still had contemporary resonance due to the policies of George W. Bush, and the band finally recorded it for In Time, with only slightly updated lyrics and under the new title "Bad Day". In the liner notes for In Time, Peter Buck wrote: "We started writing this song in 1986 [sic]. We finished writing it in 2003. The sad thing is, between those years nothing much has changed."

== Music video ==
The official music video was directed by Tim Hope and shot in Vancouver in May 2003. It is a parody of cable news and was produced by Passion Pictures. It appears on In View, the DVD companion of In Time, and is also found on the main CD of In Time.

In the video, Stipe appears as the Morning Team's news anchor Cliff Harris; Mike Mills doubles as roving reporter Ed Colbert and meteorologist Rick Jennings; and Buck as climate expert Geoff Sayers and the reporter Eric Nelson. News stories shown include a monsoon contained within an apartment, a senator's office flooding, and a tornado inside a boy's bedroom.

== In other media ==
The song can be heard in a third-season episode of Alias, in the Scrubs episode "My Advice To You", in the 76th episode of Boston Public, in episode 1.11 "The Uncertainty Principle" of Joan of Arcadia and in the Smallville episode "Slumber."

The song is included on R.E.M. Live.

In 2016, Brand New lead singer Jesse Lacey covered the song on a split EP with Kevin Devine.

== Track listings ==
UK CD1 (Warner W624CD1) (UK)

1. "Bad Day" (Berry, Buck, Mills, Stipe)
2. "Favorite Writer" (Linda Hopper, Ruthie Morris)
3. "Bad Day" (video)

UK CD2 (Warner W624CD2) (UK)

1. "Bad Day"
2. "Out in the Country" (Paul Williams, Roger Nichols)
3. "Adagio" (Buck, Mills, Stipe)

US CD single (Warner 16533–2) (US)

1. "Bad Day"
2. "Favorite Writer" (Hopper, Morris)
3. "Out in the Country" (Williams, Nichols)
4. "Adagio" (Buck, Mills, Stipe)

== Charts ==
Chart (2003)	Peak position
Australia (ARIA)	22
Austria (Ö3 Austria Top 40)	45
Belgium (Ultratip Bubbling Under Flanders)	4
Belgium (Ultratip Bubbling Under Wallonia)	9
Canada (Nielsen SoundScan)	17
Croatia (HRT)	10
Europe (Eurochart Hot 100)	20
Germany (GfK)	39
Ireland (IRMA)	11
Italy (FIMI)	9
Netherlands (Dutch Top 40 Tipparade)	8
Netherlands (Single Top 100)	68
Norway (VG-lista)	11
Scottish Singles Sales (Official Charts)	7
Spain (Promusicae)	4
Sweden (Sverigetopplistan)	43
Switzerland (Schweizer Hitparade)	39
UK Singles (Official Charts)	8
US Adult Alternative Airplay (Billboard)	1

== Release history ==
Region	Date	Format(s)	Label(s)	Ref.
United States	September 15, 2003	Hot AC; mainstream rock; triple A; alternative radio	Warner Bros.	
Australia	October 13, 2003	CD	Warner Bros.	
United Kingdom	October 13, 2003	CD	Warner Bros.	
