= Bang and Blame =

1994 single by R.E.M

Single by R.E.M.

from the album Monster
- B-side: "Bang and Blame" (instrumental version)
- Released: October 31, 1994
- Genre: Hard rock
- Length: 5:30 (album with short interlude); 4:51 (single edit)
- Label: Warner Bros.
- Songwriters: Bill Berry; Peter Buck; Mike Mills; Michael Stipe
- Producers: Scott Litt; R.E.M.

R.E.M. singles chronology
"What's the Frequency, Kenneth?" (1994)	"Bang and Blame" (1994)	"Crush with Eyeliner" (1995)

Music video
- "Bang and Blame" on YouTube

"Bang and Blame" is a song by American alternative rock group R.E.M. It was released as the second single from their ninth studio album, Monster (1994), on October 31, 1994, by Warner Bros. Records. The song was R.E.M.'s last to reach the top 40 on the US Billboard Hot 100, peaking at number 19, and was also their last number-one single on the Billboard Modern Rock Tracks chart. The single reached number one in Canada—R.E.M.'s only single to do so—and peaked inside the top 40 on the charts of Australia, Belgium, Finland, Iceland, Ireland, Israel, the Netherlands, New Zealand, and the United Kingdom.

Stipe has described the song as being about domestic violence, however, it has also been suggested that the song is about Stipe's relationship with the recently deceased River Phoenix, to whom the entire album is dedicated. Phoenix's sister, Rain, provides backing vocals for the track, as does Stipe's sister, Lynda.

== Critical reception ==
Steve Baltin from Cash Box named 'Bang and Blame' Pick of the Week and "one of the strongest tracks on the entire album." He wrote, "A hard-edged guitar tune, vocalist Michael Stipe gets one of his best moments of Monster when he sings, "You kiss on me/don't kiss on me/you tug on me don't tug on me." The propulsive rhythm of this track should also prove enticing even to non-fans of the group." Fell and Rufer from the Gavin Report felt that "Stipe's angst bites the hand that used to feed it. 'Bang and Blame' seems to be the result of some bad kiss 'n' tell. His genius as an oblique lyricist is most of his charm. The arrangement adds to the drama and makes it almost irresistible. Hot A/C will eat this one for lunch." Terry Staunton from Melody Maker named it "one of the least effective songs on the Monster album, and therefore a particularly odd choice for a single."

Martin Aston from Music Week gave it a score of four out of five and considered it "a more memorably commercial outing [than 'What's the Frequency, Kenneth?']. Medium paced with a sharply resonant chorus, 'Bang & Blame' sounds like Top 10 material." Keith Cameron from NME said it "hinges on an archetypically pretty melody and Stipe's ambiguous voice, caught betwixt disdain and sympathy for the song's distressed subject". Neil Spencer from The Observer wrote that on tracks such as "Bang and Blame", "there are bursts of the musical invention and humanist outlook that characterises their best work." Roy Wilkinson from Select described it as "'Losing My Religion' at two-thirds pace, with reggae-lite rhythms". Jordan Paramor from Smash Hits gave it three out of five, adding that "this is yet more weird warblings about life and stuff. However, I'm certain that like most of their singles, it'll be a grower. But come on, R.E.M., do cheer up a bit."

== Track listings ==
All songs were written by Bill Berry, Peter Buck, Mike Mills, and Michael Stipe. All live tracks were recorded at the 40 Watt Club, Athens, Georgia, on November 19, 1992. The performance, a benefit for Greenpeace, was recorded on a solar-powered mobile studio.

- US 7-inch, cassette, and CD single
1. "Bang and Blame" – 4:48
2. "Bang and Blame" (instrumental version) – 4:48
- UK 7-inch and cassette single
1. "Bang and Blame" (album version) – 4:48
2. "Bang and Blame" (K version) – 4:58
- UK, European, Australian, and Japanese CD single
1. "Bang and Blame" (album version) – 4:48
2. "Losing My Religion" (live) – 4:33
3. "Country Feedback" (live) – 4:12
4. "Begin the Begin" (live) – 3:26

== Charts ==
=== Weekly charts ===
Chart (1994–1995)	Peak position
Australia (ARIA)	29
Belgium (Ultratop 50 Flanders)	22
Canada Top Singles (RPM)	1
Europe (Eurochart Hot 100)	46
Europe (European Hit Radio)	9
Finland (Suomen virallinen lista)	10
France (SNEP)	44
Germany (GfK)	74
Iceland (Íslenski Listinn Topp 40)	5
Ireland (IRMA)	14
Israel (Israeli Singles Chart)	23
Netherlands (Dutch Top 40)	26
Netherlands (Single Top 100)	24
New Zealand (Recorded Music NZ)	17
Scottish Singles Sales (Official Charts)	12
UK Singles (Official Charts)	15
UK Rock & Metal (Official Charts)	12
UK Airplay (Music Week)	16
US Billboard Hot 100	19
US Alternative Airplay (Billboard)	1
US Mainstream Rock (Billboard)	3
US Pop Airplay (Billboard)	13

=== Year-end charts ===
Chart (1994)	Position
Iceland (Íslenski Listinn Topp 40)	94

Chart (1995)	Position
Canada Top Singles (RPM)	22
US Album Rock Tracks (Billboard)	27

== Release history ==
Region	Date	Format(s)	Label(s)	Ref.
United Kingdom	October 31, 1994	7-inch vinyl; CD; cassette	Warner Bros.	
Japan	January 25, 1995	CD	Warner Bros.	

== In popular culture ==
"Bang and Blame" was featured in the Cold Case episode "Blackout" as well as in the Danish mini-series "Charlot og Charlotte" by Ole Bornedal (director of "Nattevagten"/"The Night Watch"), the My Mad Fat Diary episode "Not I" and the Melrose Place episode "No Strings Attached". The song was also used in "Weird Al" Yankovic's polka medley "The Alternative Polka" from his 1996 album Bad Hair Day. The song also leant its title to Episode 7 of Law & Order: Trial By Jury in 2005.
