= Crush with Eyeliner =

1995 single by R.E.M.

Single by R.E.M.

from the album Monster
- B-side: "Crush with Eyeliner" (instrumental version)
- Released: January 16, 1995
- Genre: Glam rock; garage rock
- Length: 4:39
- Label: Warner Bros.
- Songwriters: Bill Berry; Peter Buck; Mike Mills; Michael Stipe
- Producers: Scott Litt; R.E.M.

R.E.M. singles chronology
"Bang and Blame" (1994)	"Crush with Eyeliner" (1995)	"Strange Currencies" (1995)

Music video
- "Crush with Eyeliner" on YouTube

"Crush with Eyeliner" is a song by American rock band R.E.M., released by Warner Bros. Records as the third single from their ninth studio album, Monster (1994). Sonic Youth's Thurston Moore provides background vocals. Michael Stipe claims the song was inspired by the band New York Dolls, who, in his opinion, "knew how to exaggerate a song, to make it sound really sleazy and over the top." This was also one of the first songs that surfaced from Stipe after the writer's block that hounded him after the death of his friend, actor River Phoenix.

First released in Australia on January 16, 1995, the song reached number 55 on the ARIA Singles Chart. The song was issued in other territories later in the year, peaking at number four in Iceland, number 23 in the United Kingdom, and number 13 on the US Billboard Bubbling Under Hot 100. The single's video, directed by Spike Jonze, shows a group of Japanese youths dancing and miming to the track at a party, while the band are shown briefly, looking on. It is available on the music video compilation Parallel.

== Critical reception ==
Chuck Campbell from Knoxville News Sentinel noted that on the "swaggering" "Crush with Eyeliner", Michael Stipe's "come-on is more self-assured and humorous." Andrew Mueller from Melody Maker wrote, "Thurston Moore makes a few ludicrous mutterings, but, not for the last time, Stipe's vocal is the revelation. He's never sounded so wasted, snarling a fascinated/revolted paean to a past-midnight myth who might have wandered in from 'Walk on the Wild Side'." Another Melody Maker editor, Holly Hernandez, called it "a studied repercussion, glancing off the sides of their previous perfect pop."

Keith Cameron from NME viewed it as "a replicant duet" between Stipe and Moore, adding, "How can I convince her/That I'm invented too?" leers Mike. "Yeah, life is strange", weasels the sympathetic Thurst. Bloodlessly cool." In a separate review, Cameron said "Crush with Eyeliner" "is so ironic you get a free pair of spectacles with windscreen wiper attached when you bring a copy". Paul Evans from Rolling Stone felt the song "flirts" with the Doors' "Hello, I Love You". Mark Sutherland from Smash Hits gave it two out of five in his review of the single. Howard Hampton from Spin found that "R.E.M. goes out on a severed limb to invoke the mad, corrupt dazzle of Roxy Music's 'Street Life'. The incongruity of R.E.M. straying so far from hallowed ground is a stunning rush, yet the reversal of expectations produced no equivalent reversal of perspective."

== Track listings ==
All songs were written by Bill Berry, Peter Buck, Mike Mills, and Michael Stipe.

US CD and 12-inch single, UK and Australian CD single

1. "Crush with Eyeliner" – 4:39
2. "Fall on Me" (live) – 3:23
3. "Me in Honey" (live) – 4:18
4. "Finest Worksong" (live) – 4:10

UK cassette and limited-edition 7-inch single

1. "Crush with Eyeliner" – 4:39
2. "Crush with Eyeliner" (instrumental) – 4:39
- All live tracks were recorded at the 40 Watt Club, Athens, Georgia, on November 19, 1992. The performance, a benefit for Greenpeace, was recorded on a solar-powered mobile studio.

== Charts ==
=== Weekly charts ===
Weekly chart performance for "Crush with Eyeliner"
Chart	Peak position
Australia (ARIA)	55
Belgium (Ultratop 50 Flanders)	45
Canada Top Singles (RPM)	28
Europe (Eurochart Hot 100)	62
Europe (European Hit Radio)	37
Iceland (Íslenski Listinn Topp 40)	4
Ireland (IRMA)	21
Scottish Singles Sales (Official Charts)	23
UK Singles (Official Charts)	23
US Bubbling Under Hot 100 (Billboard)	13
US Alternative Airplay (Billboard)	20
US Mainstream Rock (Billboard)	33

=== Year-end charts ===
Year-end chart performance for "Crush with Eyeliner"
Chart	Position
Iceland (Íslenski Listinn Topp 40)	40

== Release history ==
Release dates and formats for "Crush with Eyeliner"
Region	Date	Format(s)	Label(s)	Ref.
Australia	January 16, 1995	CD; cassette	Warner Bros.	
United Kingdom	January 23, 1995	7-inch vinyl; CD; cassette	Warner Bros.	
Japan	March 25, 1995	CD	Warner Bros.	
United States	July 17, 1995	Alternative radio	Warner Bros.	
