= Monster (R.E.M. album) =

Studio album by R.E.M.
- Released: September 26, 1994
- Recorded: October 1993 – May 1994
- Studios: Kingsway, New Orleans; Crossover Soundstage, Atlanta; Criteria, Miami; Ocean Way, Hollywood
- Genres: Alternative rock; grunge; glam rock; garage rock
- Length: 49:15
- Label: Warner Bros.
- Producers: Scott Litt; R.E.M.

R.E.M. chronology
The Automatic Box (1993)	Monster (1994)	R.E.M.: Singles Collected (1994)

Singles from Monster
- 1. "What's the Frequency, Kenneth?" Released: September 5, 1994; 2. "Bang and Blame" Released: October 31, 1994; 3. "Crush with Eyeliner" Released: January 16, 1995; 4. "Strange Currencies" Released: April 3, 1995; 5. "Tongue" Released: July 17, 1995

25th anniversary edition

Monster is the ninth studio album by American rock band R.E.M., released by Warner Bros. Records in the UK on September 26, 1994, and in the United States the following day. It was produced by the band and Scott Litt and recorded at four studios. The album was an intentional shift from the style of the band's previous two albums, Out of Time (1991) and Automatic for the People (1992), by introducing loud, distorted guitar tones and simpler lyrics.

Led by the successful single "What's the Frequency, Kenneth?," Monster debuted at number one in the United States and at least seven other countries, and received generally positive reviews. Four more singles were released from the album, including UK top-20 hits "Bang and Blame," "Strange Currencies" and "Tongue." In 1995, the band promoted the album with its first concert tour since 1989. Although the tour was commercially successful, band members suffered several health problems. At the 37th Annual Grammy Awards, Monster was nominated for Best Rock Album, but lost to the Rolling Stones' Voodoo Lounge. The album's follow-up New Adventures in Hi-Fi (1996) was primarily recorded during the tour.

== Recording ==
Early in 1993, R.E.M. convened a four-day meeting in Acapulco to plan their next two years. The group agreed on a plan for 1994 through 1996, which included recording a new album and touring to promote it. Drummer Bill Berry was particularly eager to tour (which the band had not done since 1989), and insisted that the album "rock". "If we did another record like Out of Time or Automatic for the People, we'd be sitting on stools all night and swapping acoustic instruments, and that would be kind of boring," he said in October 1994. The band agreed that after their previous two albums, they did not want to record another slow-paced album. Frontman Michael Stipe in a 2019 interview with BBC Music viewed the album as an attempt to "reinvent" R.E.M., wanting to do "something that was loud and brash and punk rock."

Later that year, R.E.M. began recording their ninth album. Pre-production took place at Kingsway Studio in New Orleans under the supervision of Mark Howard, who had worked on Automatic for the People. Guitarist Peter Buck said that the band wrote 45 songs, including "a whole album's worth of acoustic stuff" which they demoed. According to Howard, the sessions were experimental: "The bass had a tremolo sound on it. It was a more inventive session for them." The studio did not have a control room, so Howard recorded Michael Stipe singing lyrical ideas while lying on a couch: "Being able to put those vocals down helped him write the lyrics to a lot of songs on Monster." When the sessions were finished Howard played the recordings to co-producer Scott Litt, who had worked with the band since their fifth album (Document, 1987).

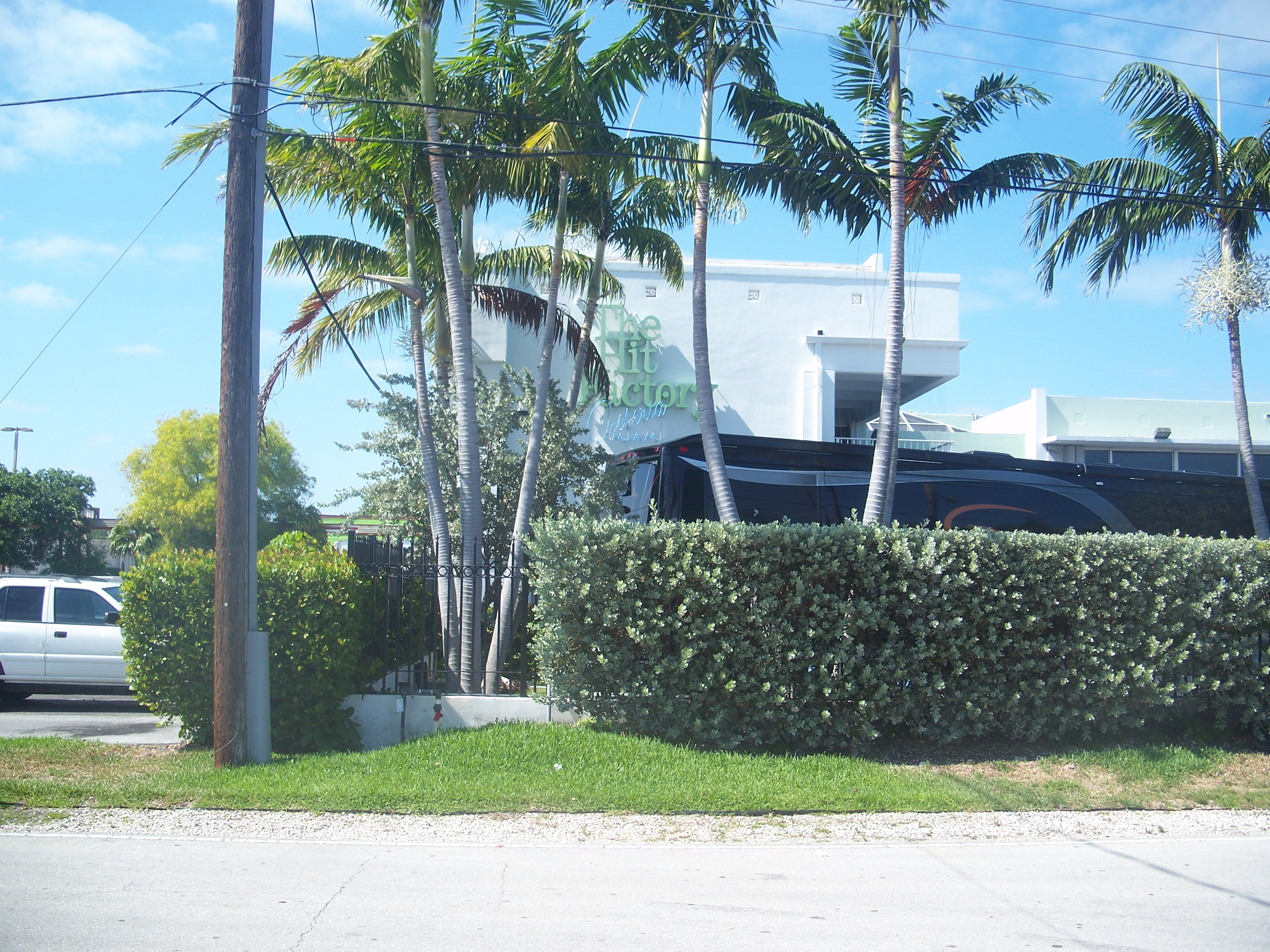
Part of Monster was recorded at Criteria Studios.

In February 1994, the band moved to Crossover Soundstage in Atlanta, Georgia. At Crossover, most of the album's basic tracks were recorded live as if the band were playing in concert. Litt said, "I thought since they hadn't toured in a while, it would be good for them to get into that mind-set—you know, monitors, PA, standing up". The sessions were hampered by several events, including Berry and bassist Mike Mills falling ill on separate occasions, Buck and Stipe leaving to visit family members and the deaths of Stipe's friends, Nirvana's Kurt Cobain and actor River Phoenix. The band wrote and recorded "Let Me In" in tribute to Cobain and dedicated the album to Phoenix, whose sister Rain provided background vocals on "Bang and Blame".

In late April 1994 the band relocated to Criteria Studios in Miami, Florida, but recording was interrupted because Stipe had an abscessed tooth. Unlike previous album sessions, by the time production moved to Ocean Way Recording in Los Angeles the band was behind schedule. Litt attributed the delay to recording live at Crossover, which lengthened the mixing process; he told Rolling Stone, "We're trying to figure out how raw to leave it and how much to studiofy it." Stipe was still writing songs when the band was supposed to be mixing the album. Tensions arose among the band members, who were staying in different locations in Los Angeles and would rarely be in the studio at the same time. The situation came to a head when the group was recording at Louie's Clubhouse (Litt's home studio in Los Angeles); years later, Stipe recalled, "We broke up ... We reached the point where none of us could speak to each other, and we were in a small room, and we just said 'Fuck off' and that was it." The group met to resolve their issues; Mills told Rolling Stone, "We have to begin working as a unit again, which we haven't been doing very well lately."

== Composition ==
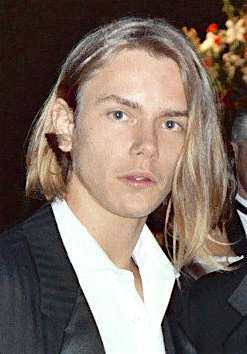
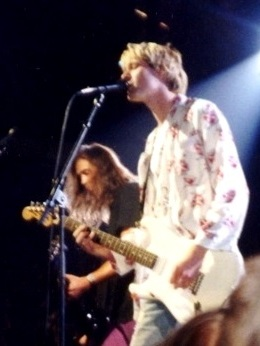
The deaths of the American actor River Phoenix (left) and musician Kurt Cobain (right), were a factor for the composition of Monster. Both maintained a close friendship with Michael Stipe.

Unlike R.E.M.'s previous two albums, Monster incorporated distorted guitar tones, minimal overdubs, and touches of 1970s glam rock. Peter Buck described the album as "a 'rock' record, with the 'rock' in quotation marks." He explained, "That's not what we started out to make, but that's certainly how it turned out to be. There's a nudge, nudge, wink, wink feel to the whole record. Like, it's a rock record, but is it really?" Mike Mills told Time, "On past albums we had been exploring acoustic instruments, trying to use the piano and mandolin, and we did it about all we wanted to do it. And you come back to the fact that playing loud electric-guitar music is about as fun as music can be." Stipe's vocals were pushed down in the mix. Buck's guitar work on the album was inspired by the tremolo-heavy guitar playing of Glen Johansson of Echobelly, who supported R.E.M. on some of the Monster Tour. The album's music has been described as grunge, alternative rock, and glam rock. One critic noted its "sloppy lo-fi fun-isms" in contrast to New Adventures in Hi-Fi. The band has called it a "foxy, in-your-face, punk rock, trashed and stupid" record. "What's the Frequency, Kenneth?", "Crush with Eyeliner" and "Circus Envy" have been described as glam rock.

Stipe wrote Monster's lyrics in character; this, according to biographer Dan Buckley, "set the real Stipe at a distance from the mask adopted for each song." The album dealt with the nature of celebrity and "the creepiness of fandom as pathology". Buck called the album a reaction to the band's popularity: "When I read the lyrics I thought, all these guys are totally fucked up. I don't know who they are, because they're not Michael. I would say that this was the only time where he's done characters that are creepy, and I don't know if anyone got that. He was getting out his things by acting out these parts that are not him." The band noted that at the end of certain songs, they left blank choruses (where Mills and Berry would usually sing harmony) so fans could sing along.

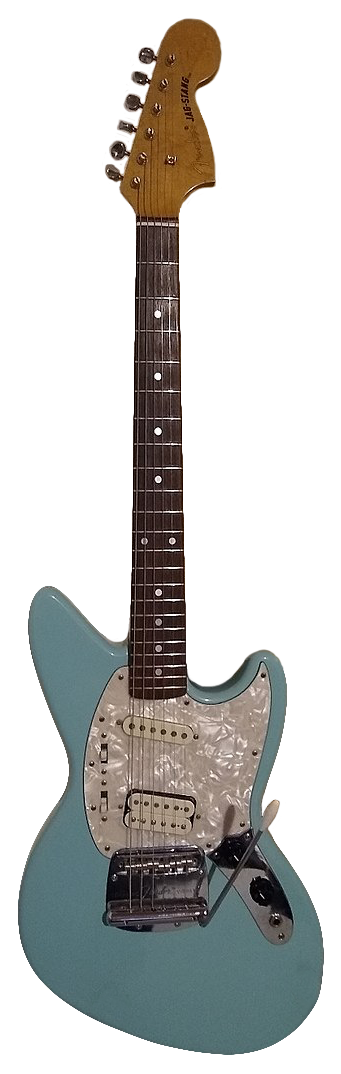
"Let Me In", a tribute to deceased musician Kurt Cobain, was played using a Fender Jag-Stang guitar that belonged to him.

The song "Let Me In" was dedicated to the memory of American musician Kurt Cobain, leader of the grunge band Nirvana, who maintained a close friendship with Stipe. On April 5, 1994, during the first recording sessions for Monster, he died from a self-inflicted shotgun wound. On the recording of the track, Mills used a Fender Jag-Stang guitar that belonged to Cobain; his widow Courtney Love, leader of the band Hole, gave it to Mills. As Cobain was left-handed and Mills was right-handed, he had to play the guitar backwards. On the other hand, Buck used a Farfisa organ during the recording of the track. Speaking during BBC Radio 1's Evening Session Show in 1994, Stipe reflected on how the deaths of Cobain and American actor River Phoenix contributed to the creation of Monster: "We feel like we reached a zenith with that record. River's death prevented me from being able to write for almost five months. When I did start writing I came up with 'Crush With Eyeliner,' 'What's the Frequency, Kenneth?,' 'Circus Envy' and then when Kurt died halfway through making the record and I just threw my arms up and I had to express the frustration that I had, trying to pull him out of the state of mind he was in and not succeeding you know, I wrote that song ('Let Me In') and we put it on the record".

== Packaging ==
The cover art features a blurred drawing of a bear's head against an orange background. The concept originated when Stipe showed cover artist Chris Bilheimer a balloon he wanted to use as the album cover and told him to "play around with". Bilheimer changed the color of the balloon (which was originally green), and re-photographed the bear head. When he was down to the last few frames on a roll of film, he took a few photos without bothering to focus the shots, which he and Stipe ended up liking the best. The jewel case of the original CD release of Monster also featured an orange polystyrene media tray, akin to the yellow one used for the Automatic for the People CD. The back cover has the body of the bear next to the track listing, and the inside sleeve features images of the cartoon character Migraine Boy. "I lifted Migraine Boy from the Flagpole," Stipe told Molly McCommons, his 12-year-old interviewer and daughter of Flagpole editor Pete McCommons. "I'd like to officially thank Flagpole for introducing me to Greg Fiering and Migraine Boy. I haven't met Greg, but I've talked to him a lot on the phone. We were actually in San Francisco at the same time, but I was working on another project and we had a television visit for about two hours. This is an exclusive. I don't think anybody else knows about Migraine Boy yet." The booklet contains several alternate names and working titles of songs recorded for the album. In interviews, the band has described its process of naming albums: they tape a large sheet of paper on the studio wall, and then write down random ideas as they occur. One song mentioned on the list is "Revolution", an outtake which later appeared on the Batman & Robin soundtrack and the bonus disc of In Time: The Best of R.E.M. 1988–2003. "Yes, I Am Fucking with You" was the working title of "King of Comedy". The limited-edition deluxe CD was packaged with a 52-page hardcover book of photographs and artwork (including Migraine Boy), similar to the visual extras in other 1980s and 1990s limited-edition R.E.M. albums (which were usually overseen and directed by Stipe). The Monster book also included an obi strip and a different design printed on the disc itself, which fitted into a die-cut, star-shaped opening inside the book's cover.

== Release and reception ==
Professional ratings
Initial reviews (in 1994)
Review scores
Source	Rating
Chicago Tribune	3.5/4 stars
Entertainment Weekly	B+
Los Angeles Times	4/4 stars
Music Week	5/5 stars
NME	7/10
Q	3/5 stars
Rolling Stone	4.5/5 stars
The Village Voice	A−

Professional ratings
Retrospective reviews (after 1994)
Aggregate scores
Source	Rating
Metacritic	83/100
Review scores
Source	Rating
AllMusic	3/5 stars
Blender	5/5 stars
Pitchfork	8.1/10

Monster debuted at number one on the Billboard 200 with first week sales of 344,000 copies and sold 131,000 copies in four days to debut at number one on the UK Albums Chart. The album was selling ten times its nearest rival, Massive Attack's Protection. There were several hits from the album; particularly "What's the Frequency, Kenneth?" and "Bang and Blame", which charted better than any single from Automatic for the People in the United States and Canada. (Note: Excluding "Everybody Hurts" from Automatic for the People, this also included the national charts in Australia.) These two singles were also successful in the United Kingdom, peaking at number nine and number 15 respectively. "Star 69" also charted, although it was not released as a single. The album was among the first promoted with online content, which was also distributed via floppy disk. Despite its strong sales numbers, the album became notorious in subsequent years for its disproportionately high resell rate, a trend reflected in the subsequent underperformance of the band's following album, New Adventures in Hi-Fi.

The album was generally praised. Rolling Stone critic Robert Palmer noted that Stipe's lyrics dealt with issues of identity ("The concept of reality itself is being called into question: Is this my life or an incredible virtual simulation?"), and the singer occasionally "begins to sound not unlike the proverbial rock star, whining about all those fans who just won't let him alone." Palmer added, "What's truly impressive about Monster is the way R.E.M. make an album with such potentially grave subject matter so much fun." NME reviewer Keith Cameron wrote, "It's fun, frequently, but we feel distanced, engaged only on a secondhand level. Moreover, the loudly trumpeted fox factor has been conspicuous by its absence." According to Cameron, "At best stunning, at worst merely diverting, Monster sounds like the album they 'had' to make, to clear out their system, a simple prop to occupy our time ..." AllMusic editor Stephen Thomas Erlewine wrote, "Monster doesn't have the conceptual unity or consistently brilliant songwriting of Automatic for the People, but it does offer a wide range of sonic textures that have never been heard on an R.E.M. album before." It was voted number 786 in the third edition of Colin Larkin's All Time Top 1000 Albums (2000).

In 2005, Warner Bros. released expanded two-disc editions of all the band's Warner Bros. studio albums. The Monster reissue included a CD, a DVD-Audio disc with a 5.1-channel surround-sound mix of the album, and concert footage from the Monster Tour. The original CD booklet's liner notes were expanded with lyrics and a photo gallery.

In November 2011 Monster was ranked ninth on Guitar World's top-ten list of 1994 guitar albums, between Rancid's Let's Go and Tesla's Bust a Nut. Guitar World also included the album on their list "Superunknown: 50 Iconic Albums That Defined 1994". Rolling Stone originally named it the year's second-best album, but dropped it to fifteenth-best in a 2014 re-ranking. "What's the Frequency, Kenneth?" was ranked at number 16 of Paste's list of The 20 Best R.E.M. Songs of All Time in 2009, number 11 of Consequence of Sound's list of R.E.M.’s Top 20 Songs, and number 19 of ThoughtCo's list of the Top 40 Best R.E.M. Songs.

== Promotion ==
=== Singles ===
Between 1994 and 1995, five singles were released to promote the album: "What's the Frequency, Kenneth?", "Bang and Blame", "Crush with Eyeliner", "Strange Currencies" and "Tongue". The first of them, "What's the Frequency, Kenneth?", went on sale on September 5, 1994, and is the lead single from the album. By its release it achieved the top position on Billboard's Alternative Airplay chart, and in Iceland. The following month, on October 31, 1994, "Bang and Blame" was published, which, like the previous single, managed to reach the first position on the Alternative Airplay chart once again. In Canada it was also positioned at the top of RPM's Canada Top Singles chart. However, "Crush with Eyeliner" failed to be more commercially successful than its predecessors, it reached position 23 on the Official Charts Company list in England and Scotland, while in Australia, Belgium and Ireland it managed to stay in position 55, 45 and 21 respectively. "Strange Currencies" was not commercially successful either, it only reached number 100 on the Australian chart, and on the Billboard Hot 100 it was ranked at position 47. By the time of the release of the last single, "Tongue", compared to its predecessors, managed to reach a higher position on the Scottish list by topping at number 10, and for Ireland it was ranked 12.

Reception of the five singles was generally positive: Steve Baltin of Cash Box rated "What's the Frequency, Kenneth?" "Peak of the Week", saying that it is "a strong song, but it is not so much a single as the introduction to the most anticipated album of the fall. On that level, it's a resounding success. The song literally explodes onto the airwaves with an updated version of classic guitar rock before rumbling drums lead the song into Michael Stipe's unique vocals. From there, the track winds its way through various rock tempos without ever losing the momentum of its initial burst of energy", and for "Bang and Blame" he commented: "With a hard-edged guitar melody, vocalist Michael Stipe gets one of his best Monster moments when he sings, “You kiss on me/don't kiss on me/you tug on me don't tug on me.” The propulsive rhythm of this song should also appeal even to non-fans of the group." Chuck Campbell of Knoxville News Sentinel commented that on "What's the Frequency, Kenneth?" Buck's "powerful but not dirty guitar" is the centerpiece of the "satisfying" first single, and he said the "swaggering" "Crush with Eyeliner" contains "the most confident, fun Michael Stipe attitude." Andrew Mueller of Melody Maker wrote that "Strange Currencies" "puts the accompaniment of "Everybody Hurts" through a brutal, cheap amplifier and replaces the universal balm with the humiliating heroism of the unrequited admirer. “Fool might be my middle name,” he sings, gloriously, uselessly in love, “I tripped and I fell... you will be mine.” Ah, the pathos, the desperate, deceptive joy of it all. Lovely." Howard Hampton of Spin felt it was better than its "emotive predecessor" "Everybody Hurts", describing it as a "tremulous, promising-your-soul" track. For "Tongue" critics praised Stipe's falsetto, Paul Evans of Rolling Stone felt that "Stipe's Chi-Lites falsetto is a revelation; elsewhere he declaims with clear authority. Stipe said that the song "Its all about cunnilingus."

=== Tour ===
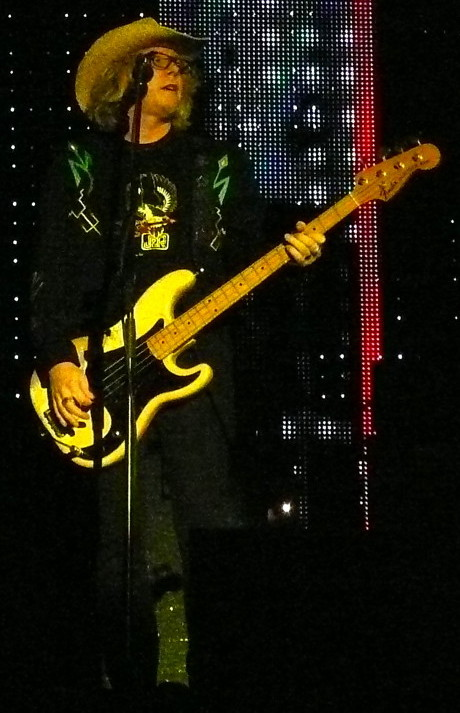
After not touring for their previous two albums, R.E.M. used an elaborate rock show to promote Monster; bassist Mike Mills (pictured in 2008) had a new look, with long hair and Nudie suits.

Despite their highest chart positions to date in 1991 and 1992, R.E.M. elected not to tour after they found the year-long Green tour exhausting. The Monster Tour was the group's first outing in six years. The tour, which played arenas and amphitheaters, as well as some stadiums in Europe, began in January 1995 with shows in Australia and Japan and continued throughout Europe and the United States for the rest of the year. Support acts included Sonic Youth, Grant Lee Buffalo, Luscious Jackson and Radiohead. Although the tour was a commercial success, it was difficult for the group. On March 1, Berry collapsed onstage during a performance in Lausanne, Switzerland due to a brain aneurysm. He had surgery immediately, and recovered fully within a month. Berry's aneurysm was the beginning of a series of health problems for the band; Mills had surgery to remove an intestinal adhesion in July, and a month later Stipe had emergency surgery to repair a hernia. However, the group composed and debuted a number of new songs on the tour and recorded most of New Adventures in Hi-Fi (their next album) on the road. They used eight-track recorders to capture the shows, and based the new album on those recordings.

== 25th anniversary reissue ==
R.E.M. decided to release a 25th anniversary deluxe edition of Monster in 2019, after having released such an edition for Monster's predecessor, Automatic for the People, in 2017. The edition contains remastered, live and demo versions of the songs from the album, as well as, unusually, a CD containing a fully remixed version of the album. The remix was the brainchild of original producer Scott Litt, who had long regretted the original mixing job he had done on Monster, which involved distortion and vocals low in the mix, in keeping with the grunge style popular at the time. He felt that the tracks were unnecessarily muddy and did not make for a cohesive album, and noted that, at used record stores, he always saw copies of Monster that people had given away, and rarely copies of R.E.M.'s other albums, indicating listener dissatisfaction. For the 25th anniversary remix, Litt made Stipe's and others' vocals more prominent and clearer, removed some instrumental tracks (like the tremolo guitar in the chorus of "What's the Frequency, Kenneth?"), and even used some different vocal takes, for example in "Strange Currencies". He cited the new version of "Let Me In", whose vocals are more comprehensible, as "maybe the best example of what's going on in the remix, which is simplicity".

The members of R.E.M., while supportive of the remix, said that they were still happy with the original production, saying that, in Stipe's words, it conveyed "exactly who we were at that moment in time." The music website Pitchfork was critical of the remix, writing, "the inescapable excess of Buck’s guitar tone as well as the slipperiness of Stipe’s vocals are what make the record special; when you invert these effects, it starts to be indistinguishable from any other R.E.M. record."

== Track listing ==
All songs written by Bill Berry, Peter Buck, Mike Mills and Michael Stipe.

Side one – "C side"

1. "What's the Frequency, Kenneth?" – 4:00
2. "Crush with Eyeliner" – 4:39
3. "King of Comedy" – 3:40
4. "I Don't Sleep, I Dream" – 3:27
5. "Star 69" – 3:07
6. "Strange Currencies" – 3:52

Side two – "D side"

7. "Tongue" – 4:13
8. "Bang and Blame" – 5:30
9. "I Took Your Name" – 4:02
10. "Let Me In" – 3:28
11. "Circus Envy" – 4:15
12. "You" – 4:54

== Personnel ==
Personnel taken from Monster liner notes and Radio X.

R.E.M.

- Bill Berry – drums, percussion, backing vocals
- Peter Buck – guitar, Farfisa organ on "Let Me In"
- Mike Mills – bass guitar, piano, organ, backing vocals, guitar on "Let Me In"
- Michael Stipe – lead vocals

Additional musicians

- Ané Diaz – backing vocals on "Bang and Blame"
- Sally Dworsky – backing vocals on "King of Comedy" and "Bang and Blame"
- Lou Kregl – backing vocals on "Bang and Blame"
- Thurston Moore – backing vocals on "Crush with Eyeliner"
- Rain Phoenix – backing vocals on "Bang and Blame"
- Lynda Stipe – backing vocals on "Bang and Blame"

Technical personnel

- David Colvin – second engineer (Crossover)
- Jeff DeMorris – second engineer (Ocean Way)
- Mark Gruber – second engineer (Criteria)
- Mark Howard – engineering (Kingsway)
- Victor Janacua – second engineer (Ocean Way)
- Scott Litt – production
- Stephen Marcussen – mastering engineer (Precision Mastering)
- Pat McCarthy – engineering
- Mark "Microwave" Mytrowitz – technical assistance
- R.E.M. – production

== Charts ==
=== Weekly charts ===
Weekly chart performance for Monster
Chart (1994–95)	Peak position
Australian Albums (ARIA)	2
Austrian Albums (Ö3 Austria)	1
Belgian Albums (Ultratop Flanders)	26
Canada Top Albums/CDs (RPM)	1
Danish Albums (Hitlisten)	2
Dutch Albums (Album Top 100)	1
European Albums (European Top 100 Albums)	1
French Albums (SNEP)	11
German Albums (Offizielle Top 100)	2
Hungarian Albums (MAHASZ)	25
Italian Albums (FIMI)	52
New Zealand Albums (RMNZ)	1
Norwegian Albums (VG-lista)	2
Portuguese Albums (AFP)	3
Scottish Albums (Official Charts)	1
Spanish Albums (AFYVE)	5
Swedish Albums (Sverigetopplistan)	1
Swiss Albums (Schweizer Hitparade)	1
UK Albums (Official Charts)	1
US Billboard 200	1

=== Year-end charts ===
1994 year-end chart performance for Monster
Chart (1994)	Position
Australian Albums (ARIA)	46
Austrian Albums (Ö3 Austria)	34
Canada Top Albums/CDs (RPM)	23
European Albums (European Top 100 Albums)	15
New Zealand Albums (RMNZ)	28
Swedish Albums & Compilations (Sverigetopplistan)	13
Swiss Albums (Schweizer Hitparade)	39
UK Albums (OCC)	6
US Billboard 200	67

1995 year-end chart performance for Monster
Chart (1995)	Position
Canada Top Albums/CDs (RPM)	40
European Albums (European Top 100 Albums)	31
German Albums (Offizielle Top 100)	40
New Zealand Albums (RMNZ)	35
UK Albums (OCC)	47
US Billboard 200	36

== Certifications and sales ==
Certifications and sales for Monster
Region	Certification	Certified units/sales
Australia (ARIA)	Platinum	70,000^{^}
Austria (IFPI Austria)	Platinum	50,000^{*}
Belgium (BRMA)	Gold	25,000^{*}
Canada (Music Canada)	6× Platinum	600,000^{^}
Finland (Musiikkituottajat)	Gold	21,125
France (SNEP)	2× Gold	200,000^{*}
Germany (BVMI)	Platinum	500,000^{^}
Italy (FIMI)	2× Platinum	500,000
Netherlands (NVPI)	Gold	50,000^{^}
Spain (Promusicae)	Platinum	100,000^{^}
Sweden (GLF)	Platinum	100,000^{^}
Switzerland (IFPI Switzerland)	Platinum	50,000^{^}
United Kingdom (BPI)	3× Platinum	900,000^{^}
United States (RIAA)	4× Platinum	2,900,000
Summaries
Europe (IFPI)	2× Platinum	2,000,000^{*}
Worldwide	—	9,000,000
^{*} Sales figures based on certification alone.^{^} Shipments figures based on certification alone.

== Notes and sources ==
Footnotes

Sources

- Black, Johnny (2004). Reveal: The Story of R.E.M. Backbeat. ISBN 0-87930-776-5.
- Buckley, David (2002). R.E.M.: Fiction: An Alternative Biography. Virgin. ISBN 1-85227-927-3.
- Platt, John (1998). The R.E.M. Companion: Two Decades of Commentary. Schirmer. ISBN 0-02-864935-4.
