= What's the Frequency, Kenneth? =

1994 single by R.E.M.

Single by R.E.M.

from the album Monster
- B-side: "What's the Frequency, Kenneth?" (instrumental version)
- Released: September 5, 1994
- Recorded: October 1993
- Genre: Alternative rock; glam rock; garage rock; grunge
- Length: 4:00
- Label: Warner Bros.
- Songwriters: Bill Berry; Peter Buck; Mike Mills; Michael Stipe
- Producers: Scott Litt; R.E.M.

R.E.M. singles chronology
"Find the River" (1993)	"What's the Frequency, Kenneth?" (1994)	"Bang and Blame" (1994)

Audio sample
- "What's the Frequency, Kenneth?": file; help

"What's the Frequency, Kenneth?" is a song by American alternative rock band R.E.M. from their ninth studio album, Monster (1994). The song's title refers to an incident in New York City in 1986 in which two assailants attacked journalist Dan Rather while repeating "Kenneth, what is the frequency?"

The song was the first single taken from the album and was released by Warner Bros. Records on September 5, 1994. It peaked at number 21 on the US Billboard Hot 100 and was the first song to debut at number one on the Billboard Modern Rock Tracks chart. Internationally, the song reached number two in Canada, number four in New Zealand, and number nine on the UK Singles Chart. In Iceland, it peaked at number one for four weeks. The song's music video was directed by Peter Care, depicting the band playing along to the song under flashing lights in different colors.

"What's the Frequency, Kenneth?" was included on R.E.M.'s compilation albums In Time: The Best of R.E.M. 1988–2003 in 2003 and Part Lies, Part Heart, Part Truth, Part Garbage 1982–2011 in 2011, the only track from Monster to feature on either. The song was one of the band's most-played songs at live gigs, and was played at every show on their 2008 Accelerate tour. A live version was released on R.E.M. Live in 2007.

== History ==
=== Background and recording ===
R.E.M. began work on Monster in August 1993 and "What's the Frequency, Kenneth?" was recorded about two months later in October. This song was written and recorded at Kingsway Studio, New Orleans, where the band also wrote and recorded "Tongue" and "Crush with Eyeliner". Lead singer Michael Stipe has said in interviews that the lyrics are about the fad of commentaries about Generation X, from the point of view of one such commentator.

I wrote that protagonist as a guy who's desperately trying to understand what motivates the younger generation, who has gone to great lengths to try and figure them out, and at the end of the song it's completely fucking bogus. He got nowhere.

— Michael Stipe

Guitarist Peter Buck explained why the song slows towards its conclusion in an interview with Guitar World magazine:

The truth is, Mike [Mills, bassist] slowed down the pace and we all followed, and then I noticed he looked strange. It turned out he had appendicitis and we had to rush him to the hospital. So we never wound up redoing it.

— Peter Buck

=== Post-release ===
"What's the Frequency, Kenneth?" made its live television debut on November 12, 1994, on Saturday Night Live, recorded at NBC Studios in New York City. The set on the show opened with "What's the Frequency, Kenneth?" and was followed by two other songs from the new album, Monster, "Bang and Blame" and "I Don't Sleep, I Dream". The following year, on June 22, 1995, at Madison Square Garden in New York City, Dan Rather accompanied the band during a soundcheck performance of the song. The clip was shown prior to R.E.M.'s performance of "Crush with Eyeliner" on the Late Show with David Letterman the following night.

== Critical reception ==
Steve Baltin from Cash Box named "What's the Frequency, Kenneth?" Pick of the Week, saying it's "a strong song, but it’s not as much a single as the introduction to the most eagerly anticipated record of the fall. On that level, it’s a smashing success. The song literally explodes onto the airwaves with an updated version of classic guitar rock before the booming of the drums takes the song into Michael Stipe’s unique vocals. From there, the track weaves its way through various rock tempos without ever losing the momentum from its initial burst of energy." Chuck Campbell from Knoxville News Sentinel remarked that Buck's "powerful-but-not-grungy guitar" is the centerpiece on the "satisfying" first single. Dave Jennings from Melody Maker named it Single of the Week, adding, "It's a breezy, upbeat slice of whimsy that'll undoubtedly be filling rock club dancefloors for months to come; similar in mood and tempo to "Stand", and featuring a truly glorious psychedelic backwards guitar solo. It's R.E.M.'s back-to-basics record, reviving a few tricks from their early days — notably a great, grimy, garage-band guitar sound and half-buried vocals."

Pan-European magazine Music & Media wrote, "Are they losing their religion? Radically breaking with the tradition of their last semi-acoustic CDs, R.E.M. give a first taste of the "heavy Monstersound" of the new one." Alan Jones of Music Week found that it is "the most straightforward rock song the group has done in years, a full-throttle aural assault and very intense. With bonus live tracks, this one will sell." Keith Cameron from NME declared it as "a deceptively catchy fellow, loping atop a mellifluous Buckoid drone last spotted somewhere between "Document" and "Green", and grasping onto a Michael Stipe vocal that punctuates yearnsome heights with the hiccuping groans of an old man apparently unable to come to terms with '90s youth culture." Paul Evans from Rolling Stone called it "R.E.M.'s toughest single". Howard Hampton from Spin noted that it "lifts its catch phrase from the dadaist mugger who attacked Dan Rather a few years back. The song, wryly straddling the pop-irony curtain dividing Reservoir Dogs from stupid-pet MC David Letterman, revels in a nagging resonance that signifies nothing, but wants to say everything."

== Music video ==
Shot in Hollywood, California, in August 1994, the accompanying music video for "What's the Frequency, Kenneth?" was directed by Peter Care, who had previously worked with the band on music videos for "Drive" and "Man on the Moon" in 1992. It features the band playing along to the song under bright blue, red, yellow and green flashing lights. Michael Stipe appears timid behind the microphone until the first chorus, breaking into an energetic dance. Prominent in the guitar solo, Peter Buck uses Kurt Cobain's Jag-Stang that he received as a gift from Courtney Love after Cobain died; he plays it upside-down as Cobain was left-handed. Singer Stipe's newly shaven head and bassist Mike Mills's new look (long hair and the use of Nudie suits), prominent on the 1995 Monster world tour, were given wide exposure in this video. The suit seen in the music video was owned by musician Gram Parsons.

The DVD companion to In Time, entitled In View: The Best of R.E.M. 1988–2003 (featuring the promotional videos to most of the songs from In Time), included the music video to "What's the Frequency, Kenneth?"

== Track listings ==
All songs were written by Bill Berry, Peter Buck, Mike Mills, and Michael Stipe. The live recordings of "Monty Got a Raw Deal", "Everybody Hurts" and "Man on the Moon" were recorded at the 40 Watt Club in Athens, Georgia, on November 19, 1992. The performance—a benefit for Greenpeace—was recorded in a solar-powered mobile studio.

- US 7-inch, CD, and cassette single
1. "What's the Frequency, Kenneth?" – 3:59
2. "What's the Frequency, Kenneth?" (instrumental version) – 3:59
- US 12-inch and maxi-CD single
- UK, European, Australian, and Japanese CD single
1. "What's the Frequency, Kenneth?" – 3:59
2. "Monty's Got a Raw Deal" (live) – 4:22
3. "Everybody Hurts" (live) – 5:41
4. "Man on the Moon" (live) – 5:24
- UK 7-inch and cassette single
1. "What's the Frequency, Kenneth?" (radio version) – 3:59
2. "What's the Frequency, Kenneth?" (K version) – 3:59

== Charts ==
=== Weekly charts ===
Chart (1994)	Peak position
Australia (ARIA)	24
Austria (Ö3 Austria Top 40)	21
Belgium (Ultratop 50 Flanders)	19
Canada Retail Singles (The Record)	10
Canada Top Singles (RPM)	2
Europe (Eurochart Hot 100)	14
Europe (European Hit Radio)	7
Finland (Suomen virallinen lista)	6
Germany (GfK)	74
Iceland (Íslenski Listinn Topp 40)	1
Ireland (IRMA)	8
Israel (Israeli Singles Chart)	17
Netherlands (Dutch Top 40)	21
Netherlands (Single Top 100)	21
New Zealand (Recorded Music NZ)	4
Norway (VG-lista)	9
Scottish Singles Sales (Official Charts)	5
Sweden (Sverigetopplistan)	21
Switzerland (Schweizer Hitparade)	22
UK Singles (Official Charts)	9
UK Airplay (Music Week)	10
US Billboard Hot 100	21
US Alternative Airplay (Billboard)	1
US Dance Singles Sales (Billboard)	24
US Mainstream Rock (Billboard)	2
US Pop Airplay (Billboard)	10

=== Year-end charts ===
Chart (1994)	Position
Canada Top Singles (RPM)	16
Iceland (Íslenski Listinn Topp 40)	10
UK Singles (OCC)	102
US Album Rock Tracks (Billboard)	31
US Modern Rock Tracks (Billboard)	16

== Certifications ==
Region	Certification	Certified units/sales
United Kingdom (BPI)	Silver	200,000^{‡}
^{‡} Sales+streaming figures based on certification alone.

== Release history ==
Region	Date	Format(s)	Label(s)	Ref.
United Kingdom	September 5, 1994	7-inch vinyl; CD; cassette	Warner Bros.	
Australia	September 12, 1994	CD; cassette	Warner Bros.	
United States	September 13, 1994	7-inch vinyl; 12-inch vinyl; CD; cassette	Warner Bros.	
Japan	November 30, 1994	CD	Warner Bros.	
