= List of R.E.M. concert tours =

The following is a listing of R.E.M. tours.

== 1981 ==
=== Rapid.Eye.Movement.Tour.1981 ===
Rapid.Eye.Movement.Tour.1981
- Tour by R.E.M.
- Location: North America
- Start date: March 26, 1981
- End date: April 11, 1981
- Legs: 1
- No. of shows: 10

R.E.M. traveled extensively, mostly around the Deep South, during their first few years of being a unit. Their first real, albeit relatively local, tour took place in 1981. Mistakenly nicknamed "Rapid.Eye.Movement.Tour.1981" by the band's manager at the time, Jefferson Holt, the tour was arranged by Bill Berry, and its main aim was to help raise the necessary funds to keep the band operating. The tour was in support of their "Radio Free Europe" single, which was to be released on David Hibbert's Hib-Tone label in July 1981.

The tour began on March 26, 1981 at K. O. Jam's in Murfreesboro, Tennessee.

=== Setlist ===
The typical setlist for the tour consisted of:

1. "Rave On!" (Sonny West cover)
2. "Burning Down"
3. "A Girl Like You" (The Young Rascals cover)
4. "Get on Their Way"
5. "There She Goes Again" (The Velvet Underground cover)
6. "Pretty Persuasion"
7. "Body Count"
8. "Narrator"
9. "Hey Hey Nadine"
10. "Shaking Through"
11. "Just a Touch"
12. "(Don't Go Back to) Rockville"
13. "Dangerous Times"
14. "Sitting Still"
15. "All the Right Friends"
16. "Radio Free Europe"
17. "Little Girl"
18. "Permanent Vacation"
19. "Mystery to Me"
20. "Gardening at Night"
21. "Windout"
22. "I Can't Control Myself" (The Troggs cover)
23. "Wait"
24. "Baby I"
25. "Scheherazade" (Nikolai Rimsky-Koraskov cover)
26. "Lisa Says" (The Velvet Underground cover)
27. "9-9"
28. "White Tornado"

Date	City	Country	Venue
March 26, 1981	Murfreesboro	United States	K.O. Jam's
March 27, 1981	Nashville	United States	Cantrell's
March 28, 1981	Charlotte	United States	The Milestone
March 31, 1981	Greensboro	United States	Friday's
April 2, 1981	Augusta	United States	New York
April 3, 1981	Nashville	United States	Vanderbilt University
April 4, 1981	Carrboro	United States	The Station
April 6, 1981	Raleigh	United States	The Pier
April 10, 1981	Athens	United States	Tyrone's O.C
April 11, 1981	Athens	United States	Tyrone's O.C

== 1982 ==
=== Chronic Town Tour ===
Chronic Town Tour
- Tour by R.E.M.
- Location: North America
- Associated album: Chronic Town
- Start date: August 14, 1982
- End date: December 11, 1982
- Legs: 1
- No. of shows: 73 (75 scheduled)

In August, the band's first true national tour, in support of Chronic Town, began in San Diego, California. It finished in Florida four months later.

=== Setlist ===
The typical setlist for the tour consisted of:

1. "Gardening at Night"
2. "Pilgrimage"
3. "9-9"
4. "Wolves, Lower"
5. "Romance"
6. "Moral Kiosk"
7. "Sitting Still"
8. "1,000,000"
9. "Pretty Persuasion"
10. "Catapult"
11. "Radio Free Europe"
12. "Ages of You"
13. "West of the Fields"
14. "White Tornado"
15. "Carnival of Sorts (Boxcars)"

Date	City	Country	Venue
August 14, 1982	San Diego	United States	Spirit Nightclub
August 19, 1982	Los Angeles	United States	Music Machine
August 23, 1982	San Francisco	United States	The I-Beam
August 24, 1982	San Francisco	United States	The Old Waldorf
August 25, 1982	Berkeley	United States	Berkeley Square
August 26, 1982	Sacramento	United States	Galactica 2000
August 30, 1982	Fullerton	United States	Ichabod's
August 31, 1982	Los Angeles	United States	Club Lingerie
September 2, 1982	Los Angeles	United States	Music Machine
September 3, 1982	Santa Monica	United States	Madame Wong's West
September 4, 1982	Los Angeles	United States	Rissmiller's
September 5, 1982	San Francisco	United States	Kabuki Nightclub
September 9, 1982	Pasadena	United States	Perkins Palace
September 10, 1982	Los Angeles	United States	Reseda Country Club
September 11, 1982	San Diego	United States	Adams Avenue Theater
September 12, 1982	Phoenix	United States	The Cellar
September 13, 1982	Tucson	United States	Wild Cat House
September 14, 1982	Tucson	United States	Student Union Cellar
September 16, 1982	Albuquerque	United States	University Arena
September 17, 1982	Amarillo	United States	Amarillo Roller Rink
September 19, 1982	Tulsa	United States	Cain's Ballroom
September 20, 1982	Kansas City	United States	Parody Hall
September 21, 1982	Lincoln	United States	The Drumstick
September 22, 1982	Minneapolis	United States	First Avenue
September 23, 1982	Carbondale	United States	Roman Room
September 24, 1982	Champaign	United States	George Huff Gymnasium
September 25, 1982	Chicago	United States	Stages Music Hall
September 26, 1982	Chicago	United States	Cabaret Metro
September 28, 1982	Cincinnati	United States	Bogart's
September 29, 1982	Cleveland	United States	Agora Ballroom
September 30, 1982	Pittsburgh	United States	Heaven
October 1, 1982	Richmond	United States	Empire Theater
October 2, 1982	Trenton	United States	City Gardens
October 4, 1982	Providence	United States	The Living Room
October 5, 1982	Boston	United States	The Metro
October 6, 1982	New Haven	United States	Toad's Place
October 8, 1982	New York City	United States	Peppermint Lounge
October 9, 1982	Baltimore	United States	Marble Bar
October 10, 1982	Raleigh	United States	The Pier
October 11, 1982	Charlotte	United States	The Milestone
October 13, 1982	Richmond	United States	Scoundrels
October 14, 1982	Columbia	United States	Striders Concert Hall
October 15, 1982	Atlanta	United States	Agora Ballroom
October 21, 1982	Athens	United States	i & i Club
October 22, 1982	Athens	United States	i & i Club
October 29, 1982	Atlanta	United States	Fred B. Wenn Ballroom
November 5, 1982	Baton Rouge	United States	The Bayou
November 6, 1982	New Orleans	United States	Tupelo's Tavern
November 8, 1982	Birmingham	United States	Old Town Music Hall
November 9, 1982	Knoxville	United States	The Place
November 10, 1982	Knoxville	United States	Hobo's
November 11, 1982	Nashville	United States	Sarratt Cinema
November 12, 1982	Memphis	United States	The Antenna Club
November 13, 1982	Carbondale	United States	Roman Room
November 14, 1982	Bloomington	United States	Second Story Nightclub
November 15, 1982	Columbia	United States	The Blue Note
November 16, 1982	Lawrence	United States	Lawrence Opera House
~~November 18, 1982~~	Louisville	United States	The Beat
November 20, 1982	Detroit	United States	Saint Andrew's Hall
November 21, 1982	Ann Arbor	United States	Joe's Star Lounge
November 23, 1982	Albany	United States	The Chateau Lounge
November 24, 1982	Hempstead	United States	Nassau Coliseum
November 25, 1982	New York City	United States	Peppermint Lounge
November 26, 1982	Philadelphia	United States	East Side Club
November 27, 1982	Hoboken	United States	Maxwell's
November 28, 1982	Washington, D.C.	United States	9:30 Club
~~November 29, 1982~~	Blacksburg	United States	After Sundown
December 2, 1982	Greenville	United States	UPS Club
December 3, 1982	Athens	United States	i & i Club
December 6, 1982	Orlando	United States	Park Avenue
December 8, 1982	Hallandale Beach	United States	Agora Ballroom
December 9, 1982	Pensacola	United States	McGuigan's Speakeasy
December 10, 1982	Mobile	United States	Badger's Den
December 11, 1982	Mobile	United States	Saenger Theatre

== 1983 ==
=== Murmur Tour ===
Murmur Tour
- Tour by R.E.M.
- Location: North America, Europe
- Associated album: Murmur
- Start date: March 26, 1983
- End date: November 25, 1983
- Legs: 3
- No. of shows: 98 in North America; 5 in Europe; 103 in total

A tour in support of Murmur got underway in March. The band made their first live television appearance during the tour, on Late Night with David Letterman on October 6. The tour concluded in Europe in late November.

=== Setlist ===
This set list is representative of the performance in Rouen, France. It does not represent all concerts for the duration of the tour.

1. "Gardening at Night"
2. "9-9"
3. "Catapult"
4. "Letter Never Sent"
5. "Pilgrimage"
6. "7 Chinese Bros."
7. "Talk About the Passion"
8. "So. Central Rain (I'm Sorry)"
9. "Sitting Still"
10. "Harborcoat"
11. "Moral Kiosk"
12. "Little America"
13. "Second Guessing"
14. "Radio Free Europe"
15. "Pale Blue Eyes"
16. "Camera"
17. "1,000,000"
18. "Carnival of Sorts (Box Cars)"
19. "Wolves, Lower"

The typical setlist for the tour consisted of:

1. "Moral Kiosk"
2. "Pilgrimage"
3. "Laughing"
4. "Catapult"
5. "Talk About the Passion"
6. "7 Chinese Bros."
7. "Sitting Still"
8. "Wolves, Lower"
9. "Gardening at Night"
10. "Harborcoat"
11. "9-9"
12. "Pretty Persuasion"
13. "Windout"
14. "Just a Touch"
15. "West of the Fields"
16. "Radio Free Europe"
17. "1,000,000"
18. "We Walk"
19. "Carnival of Sorts (Boxcars)"

=== Tour dates ===
Date	City	Country	Venue	Opening act(s)
North America (Supporting The English Beat from March 26 – April 24)
March 26, 1983	Durham	United States	Page Auditorium	—N/a
March 27, 1983	Chapel Hill	United States	Memorial Hall	—N/a
March 28, 1983	Columbia	United States	Russell House Ballroom	—N/a
March 30, 1983	Daytona Beach	United States	Club 600 North	—N/a
March 31, 1983	Coral Gables	United States	The Patio	—N/a
April 2, 1983	Sewanee	United States	Sewanee Academy Dining Hall	—N/a
April 5, 1983	Nashville	United States	Memorial Gymnasium	—N/a
April 7, 1983	Cincinnati	United States	Bogart's	—N/a
April 8, 1983	Lexington	United States	Grand Ballroom	—N/a
April 9, 1983	Oberlin	United States	Finney Chapel	—N/a
April 10, 1983	Detroit	United States	Grand Circus Theatre	—N/a
April 12, 1983	London	Canada	Alumni Hall	—N/a
April 13, 1983	Rochester	United States	Alexander Palestra	—N/a
April 14, 1983	Buffalo	United States	Buffalo State College Sphere	—N/a
April 16, 1983	Poughkeepsie	United States	Kenyon Hall	—N/a
April 17, 1983	Montreal	Canada	Le Spectrum de Montréal	—N/a
April 19, 1983	Kirkland	United States	Alumni Gym	—N/a
April 20, 1983	New Haven	United States	Woolsey Hall	—N/a
April 22, 1983	Boston	United States	Walter Brown Arena	—N/a
April 23, 1983	Hartford	United States	Agora Ballroom	—N/a
April 24, 1983	Aberdeen	United States	Fountain Casino	—N/a
April 26, 1983	Farmingdale	United States	Spize Club	—N/a
April 28, 1983	Hoboken	United States	Maxwell's	The Bongos
April 29, 1983	Providence	United States	The Living Rooms	Arms Akimbo; Prisoners of Beat
April 30, 1983	New York City	United States	The Ritz	The Individuals
May 2, 1983	Blacksburg	United States	After Dark	Not Shakespeare
May 3, 1983	Raleigh	United States	The Pier	Rick Rock
May 4, 1983	Blowing Rock	United States	P.B. Scott's Music Hall	—N/a
May 6, 1983	Davidson	United States	Love Auditorium	86
May 7, 1983	Atlanta	United States	Agora Ballroom	—N/a
May 8, 1983	Atlanta	United States	Fox Theatre	—N/a
May 9, 1983	Athens	United States	40 Watt Club	—N/a
May 18, 1983	New York City	United States	The Ritz	The Individuals
May 21, 1983	Saint Paul	United States	Navy Island	The Suburbs (HL) Let's Active; The Phones; The Replacements
May 22, 1983	Milwaukee	United States	The Palms	Let's Active
May 23, 1983	Madison	United States	Headliners	Let's Active
May 25, 1983	Chicago	United States	Park West	Let's Active; The dB's
May 26, 1983	Bloomington	United States	Jake's	Let's Active
May 28, 1983	Lincoln	United States	Drumstick	Let's Active
May 29, 1983	Kansas City	United States	VFW Hall	The Embarrassment; Let's Active
May 30, 1983	Kansas City	United States	Uptown Theater	Let's Active
June 1, 1983	Morrison	United States	Red Rocks Amphitheatre	Bow Wow Wow (HL) The English Beat
June 3, 1983	Wichita Falls	United States	Airmen's Club	Let's Active
June 4, 1983	Dallas	United States	Charlie's	Let's Active
June 5, 1983	Austin	United States	Nite Life	Let's Active; Vital Signs
June 7, 1983	Lubbock	United States	The Roxy	Let's Active
June 10, 1983	San Diego	United States	The Spirit	Let's Active
June 11, 1983	Los Angeles	United States	The Palace	Let's Active
June 13, 1983	Sacramento	United States	Crest Theatre	The Features; Let's Active
June 14, 1983	San Francisco	United States	Old Waldorf	Let's Active
June 16, 1983	Valencia	United States	Showcase Amphitheater	Let's Active
June 17, 1983	Costa Mesa	United States	Concert Factory	—N/a
June 18, 1983	Los Angeles	United States	Music Machine	Let's Active
June 19, 1983	Santa Cruz	United States	The Catalyst	—N/a
June 20, 1983	Berkeley	United States	Keystone Berkeley	Lloyds; Bad Attitude
June 21, 1983	Palo Alto	United States	Keystone Palo Alto	Lloyds; Agent
June 22, 1983	San Francisco	United States	The Stone	Lloyds; Victims of Technology
June 28, 1983	Denver	United States	Rainbow Music Hall	Young Weasels; Computer Class
June 29, 1983	Omaha	United States	The 20's Nightclub	Digital Sex
June 30, 1983	Columbia	United States	The Blue Note	The Bel-Airs
July 1, 1983	Eureka	United States	Old Glory Amphitheater	—N/a
July 2, 1983	Indianapolis	United States	The Chase	—N/a
July 3, 1983	Milwaukee	United States	Summerfest	—N/a
July 5, 1983	Cleveland	United States	Pirate's Cove	Hungry Young Men; The Replacements
July 6, 1983	Cincinnati	United States	Bogart's	The Replacements
July 8, 1983	Detroit	United States	Saint Andrew's Hall	—N/a
July 9, 1983	Toronto	Canada	Larry's Hideaway	Personal Effects
July 13, 1983	Boston	United States	Paradise Rock Club	The Replacements
July 14, 1983	Providence	United States	The Living Room	Parallel 5th
July 15, 1983	Aberdeen	United States	Fountain Casino	The Replacements
July 17, 1983	New Haven	United States	Toad's Place	The Replacements
July 20, 1983	Philadelphia	United States	Ripley's Music Hall	The Replacements
July 21, 1983	Richmond	United States	Much More Club	The Replacements
July 23, 1983	Winston-Salem	United States	Backstreet Music Venue	Let's Active
North America (Supporting The Police from August 12–22)
August 12, 1983	Hartford	United States	Hartford Veterans Memorial Coliseum	—N/a
August 13, 1983	Hartford	United States	Hartford Veterans Memorial Coliseum	—N/a
August 15, 1983	Norfolk	United States	Norfolk Scope	—N/a
August 18, 1983	New York City	United States	Shea Stadium	—N/a
August 20, 1983	Philadelphia	United States	John F. Kennedy Stadium	—N/a
August 21, 1983	Landover	United States	Capital Centre	—N/a
August 22, 1983	Landover	United States	Capital Centre	—N/a
August 26, 1983	Austell	United States	Southern Star Amphitheater	The Killer Whales
September 30, 1983	Athens	United States	Stitchcraft, Inc	—N/a
October 3, 1983	Athens	United States	Legion Field	Land Sharks; Oh-OK
October 4, 1983	Columbia	United States	Russell House Ballroom	Let's Active
October 7, 1983	Washington, D.C.	United States	Ontario Theatre	The Fleshtones; Let's Active
October 8, 1983	Philadelphia	United States	Irvine Auditorium	Pretty Poison; Let's Active
October 9, 1983	Piscataway	United States	Hardee's	Let's Active
October 11, 1983	Poughkeepsie	United States	The Chance	Let's Active
October 12, 1983	Glenville	United States	Skyway Club	Let's Active
October 13, 1983	Providence	United States	The Living Room	Let's Active
October 14, 1983	Orono	United States	Alumni Memorial Gymnasium	Let's Active; B. Willie Smith
October 15, 1983	Waterville	United States	Wadsworth Gymnasium	Let's Active
October 16, 1983	SOlon	United States	Solon Hotel	—N/a
October 17, 1983	Syracuse	United States	Drumlins Country Club	Let's Active
October 20, 1983	Boston	United States	The Metro	Let's Active
October 21, 1983	New York City	United States	Student Union Ballroom	The Neats
October 22, 1983	New London	United States	Conn Cave	Let's Active
October 31, 1983	New York City	United States	Peppermint Lounge	The Fuzztones; The Cramps (HL)
November 10, 1983	San Francisco	United States	Kabuki Nightclub	The Neats; Let's Active
November 11, 1983	Beverly Hills	United States	Warner Beverly Hills Theater	The Neats; Let's Active
November 12, 1983	San Diego	United States	Montezuma Hall	Let's Active
Europe
November 19, 1983	London	England	Dingwalls	Recognition
November 22, 1983	London	England	Marquee Club	Jerry Floyd
November 23, 1983	Amsterdam	Netherlands	Paradiso	—N/a
November 24, 1983	Paris	France	Les Bains Douches	Feedback
November 25, 1983	Rouen	France	Exo 7	—N/a

== 1984 ==
=== Little America Tour ===
Little America Tour
- Tour by R.E.M.
- Location: Europe, North America, Asia
- Associated album: Reckoning
- Start date: April 8, 1984
- End date: December 6, 1984
- Legs: 5
- No. of shows: 32 in Europe; 71 in North America; 4 in Asia; 107 in total (111 scheduled)

R.E.M. returned to Europe in April 1984, this time in support of their second studio album, Reckoning, with a tour titled the "Little America tour" ("Little America" being a track on the album). They tour their homeland between June and November, before visiting Asia for the first time in mid-November. This was followed with a few more shows in the UK and Norway during late November and early January 1985.

=== Setlist ===
This set list is representative of the performance in Rouen, France. It does not represent all concerts for the duration of the tour.

1. "Radio Free Europe"
2. "Harborcoat"
3. "Pilgrimage"
4. "Driver 8"
5. "Talk About the Passion"
6. "Hyena"
7. "7 Chinese Bros."
8. "So. Central Rain (I'm Sorry)"
9. "Letter Never Sent"
10. "Auctioneer (Another Engine)"
11. "Gardening at Night"
12. "9-9"
13. "Windout"
14. "Old Man Kensey"
15. "Pretty Persuasion"
16. "Little America"
17. "Femme Fatale"
18. "Riders in the Sky"
19. "(Don't Go Back To) Rockville"
20. "Wolves, Lower"
21. "Moon River"
22. "Wendell Gee"
23. "See No Evil"
24. "Just a Touch"

The typical setlist for the tour consisted of:

1. "Second Guessing"
2. "Harborcoat"
3. "Pilgrimage"
4. "Hyena"
5. "7 Chinese Bros."
6. "Letter Never Sent"
7. "So. Central Rain"
8. "Talk About the Passion"
9. "Driver 8"
10. "Sitting Still"
11. "Gardening at Night"
12. "Radio Free Europe"
13. "9-9"
14. "Windout"
15. "Old Man Kensey"
16. "Pretty Persuasion"
17. "Just a Touch"
18. "Little America"
19. "Pale Blue Eyes" (The Velvet Underground cover)
20. "Femme Fatale" (The Velvet Underground cover)
21. "(Don't Go Back to) Rockville"
22. "1,000,000"
23. "Moon River" (Henry Mancini cover)
24. "We Walk"
25. "Carnival of Sorts (Boxcars)"

=== Tour dates ===
Date	City	Country	Venue	Opening act(s)
Europe
April 8, 1984	Amsterdam	Netherlands	Paradiso	My Bloody Valentine
April 9, 1984	Utrecht	Netherlands	Vrije Vloer	My Bloody Valentine
April 10, 1984	Eindhoven	Netherlands	Effenaar	My Bloody Valentine
April 12, 1984	Münster	West Germany	Odeonsplatz	My Bloody Valentine
April 13, 1984	Hamburg	West Germany	Knust Hamburg	My Bloody Valentine
April 14, 1984	Hamburg	West Germany	Knust Hamburg	My Bloody Valentine
April 15, 1984	Cologne	West Germany	Luxor	My Bloody Valentine
April 17, 1984	Rouen	France	Exo 7	Flooflash
April 18, 1984	Lyon	France	Club West Side	Flooflash
April 19, 1984	Clermont-Ferrand	France	Mansion de Peuples	Les Innocents
April 20, 1984	Paris	France	Eldorado Club	Les Innocents
April 24, 1984	Birmingham	England	Tin Can Club	154
April 25, 1984	Manchester	England	The Gallery	154
April 26, 1984	Leeds	England	The Warehouse	154
April 27, 1984	Glasgow	Scotland	Night Moves	154
April 29, 1984	Worthing	England	The Carioca	American Girls; Bright Young Things
April 30, 1984	London	England	Marquee Club	The American Girls
May 1, 1984	London	England	Marquee Club	The Escape Club
North America
June 16, 1984	Fresno	United States	Star Palace	The Dream Syndicate
June 17, 1984	Santa Cruz	United States	The Catalyst	The Dream Syndicate
June 18, 1984	Santa Barbara	United States	Mission Theater	The Dream Syndicate
June 19, 1984	Los Angeles	United States	Hollywood Palace	—N/a
June 20, 1984	Del Mar	United States	Del Mar Racetrack	Army of Love
June 22, 1984	Los Angeles	United States	Hollywood Palladium	The Dream Syndicate
June 23, 1984	Angels Camp	United States	Calaveras County Fairgrounds	—N/a
June 24, 1984	San Francisco	United States	The Warfield	The Dream Syndicate
June 26, 1984	Portland	United States	Starry Night	The Dream Syndicate
June 27, 1984	Seattle	United States	McCaw Hall	The Dream Syndicate
June 28, 1984	Vancouver	Canada	Commodore Ballroom	The Dream Syndicate
June 30, 1984	Boise	United States	Mardi Gras Ballroom	The Dream Syndicate
July 1, 1984	Salt Lake City	United States	Fairpark Coliseum	The Dream Syndicate
July 2, 1984	Glenwood Springs	United States	Bamboo Bar	The Dream Syndicate
July 3, 1984	Denver	United States	Rainbow Music Hall	The Dream Syndicate
July 5, 1984	Minneapolis	United States	Orpheum Theatre	The Dream Syndicate
July 6, 1984	Milwaukee	United States	Summerfest	—N/a
July 7, 1984	Chicago	United States	Aragon Ballroom	The Dream Syndicate
July 8, 1984	Detroit	United States	Royal Oak Music Theatre	The Dream Syndicate
July 10, 1984	Cleveland	United States	The Variety Theatre	The Dream Syndicate
July 11, 1984	Rochester	United States	Minett Hall	The Dream Syndicate
July 12, 1984	Montreal	Canada	Le Spectrum de Montréal	The Dream Syndicate
July 13, 1984	Toronto	Canada	Toronto Concert Hall	The Dream Syndicate
July 15, 1984	Buffalo	United States	Salty Dog Skyroom	The Dream Syndicate
July 16, 1984	Lower	United States	Playpen	The Dream Syndicate
July 17, 1984	Brookhaven	United States	Goodskates Roller Ballroom	The Dream Syndicate
July 19, 1984	Boston	United States	Orpheum Theatre	The Dream Syndicate
July 20, 1984	Hartford	United States	Agora Ballroom	The Dream Syndicate
July 21, 1984	New York City	United States	Beacon Theatre	The Dream Syndicate
July 22, 1984	New York City	United States	Beacon Theatre	The Dream Syndicate
July 24, 1984	Washington, D.C.	United States	Warner Theatre	The Dream Syndicate
July 25, 1984	Virginia Beach	United States	Pavilion Towers Ballroom	The Dream Syndicate
July 27, 1984	Greensboro	United States	War Memorial Auditorium	The Dream Syndicate
July 28, 1984	Atlanta	United States	Fox Theatre	The Dream Syndicate
~~August 2, 1984~~	Mexico City	Mexico	Margos Touch	—N/a
~~August 3, 1984~~	Mexico City	Mexico	Margos Touch	—N/a
~~August 4, 1984~~	Mexico City	Mexico	Margos Touch	—N/a
North America - Leg II
September 5, 1984	Pomona	United States	Pomona Valley Auditorium	The Blasters
September 6, 1984	Los Angeles	United States	Greek Theatre	Swimming Pool Q's
September 7, 1984	San Diego	United States	Fox Theatre	The dB's
September 8, 1984	Phoenix	United States	Palace West	The dB's
September 9, 1984	Tucson	United States	Centennial Hall	The dB's
September 10, 1984	Albuquerque	United States	Grand Ballroom	The dB's
September 11, 1984	Boulder	United States	Macky Auditorium	The dB's
September 13, 1984	Omaha	United States	Omaha Music Hall	The dB's
September 14, 1984	Lawrence	United States	Hoch Auditorium	The dB's
September 15, 1984	Oklahoma City	United States	The Bowery	The dB's
September 16, 1984	Dallas	United States	Bronco Bowl	The dB's
September 18, 1984	Austin	United States	Austin Opera House	The dB's
September 19, 1984	Houston	United States	Numbers 2	The dB's
September 21, 1984	Nashville	United States	War Memorial Auditorium	The dB's
September 22, 1984	Tuscaloosa	United States	Foster Auditorium	The dB's
September 23, 1984	Charlotte	United States	Park Center	The dB's
September 25, 1984	Durham	United States	Page Auditorium	The dB's
September 26, 1984	Durham	United States	Page Auditorium	The dB's
September 28, 1984	Tampa	United States	USF Soccer Stadium	The dB's
September 29, 1984	Boca Raton	United States	University Center Auditorium	The dB's
September 30, 1984	Gainesville	United States	The Bandshell	The dB's
October 2, 1984	New Orleans	United States	McAllister Auditorium	The dB's
October 3, 1984	Oxford	United States	Fulton Chapel	The dB's
October 5, 1984	Carbondale	United States	Shryock Auditorium	The dB's
October 6, 1984	St. Louis	United States	Graham Chapel	The dB's
October 7, 1984	DeKalb	United States	Egyptian Theatre	The dB's
October 8, 1984	Ann Arbor	United States	Michigan Theater	The dB's
October 10, 1984	Washington D.C	United States	Charles E. Smith Center	The dB's
October 11, 1984	Charlottesville	United States	Virginia Memorial Gymnasium	The dB's
October 12, 1984	Passaic	United States	Capitol Theatre	The dB's
October 13, 1984	Bridgeport	United States	Harvey Hubbell Gymnasium	The dB's
October 15, 1984	Amherst	United States	Fine Arts Concert Hall	The dB's
October 16, 1984	Providence	United States	Veterans Memorial Auditorium	The dB's
October 17, 1984	Upper Darby Township	United States	Tower Theater	The dB's
October 31, 1984	Honolulu	United States	Pier 10 Ballroom	Hat Makes the Man
Japan
November 5, 1984	Tokyo	Japan	Room 10	Bakufu-Slump
November 8, 1984	Tokyo	Japan	Aoyama Gakuin University	Bakufu-Slump
November 10, 1984	Yokohama	Japan	Concert Garden	Bakufu-Slump
November 11, 1984	Tokyo	Japan	Senshu Gymnasium	Bakufu-Slump
Europe
November 15, 1984	Newcastle	England	Tiffany's Ballroom	The Lucy Show
November 16, 1984	Edinburgh	Scotland	The Front	The Lucy Show
November 17, 1984	Manchester	England	Manchester Polytechnic Union	The Lucy Show
November 18, 1984	Liverpool	England	Royal Court Theatre	The Lucy Show
November 21, 1984	Nottingham	England	Rock City	The Lucy Show
November 23, 1984	Norwich	England	The LCR	The Lucy Show
November 24, 1984	Colchester	England	Essex Dance Hall	The Lucy Show
November 26, 1984	Birmingham	England	Debating Hall	The Lucy Show
November 27, 1984	Leicester	England	University of Leicester	The Lucy Show
November 28, 1984	Cardiff	Wales	New Ocean Club	The Lucy Show
November 29, 1984	Dunstable	England	Queensway Hall	The Lucy Show
~~December 1, 1984~~	Brighton	England	Cockcroft Hall	The Lucy Show
December 2, 1984	London	England	Lyceum Theatre	The Lucy Show Lyres
December 4, 1984	Dublin	Ireland	SFX Hall	The Lucy Show
December 6, 1984	Oslo	Norway	Oslo Circus	The Act

=== Cancellations and rescheduled shows ===
June 14, 1983	Los Angeles	Music Machine	Cancelled. Band refused to play.
December 1, 1984	Brighton, England	Brighton Polytechnic	Cancelled due to Stipe straining his neck.

== 1985 ==
=== Reconstruction Tour ===
Reconstruction Tour
- Tour by R.E.M.
- Location: Europe, North America
- Associated album: Fables of the Reconstruction
- Start date: April 22, 1985
- End date: December 13, 1985
- Legs: 4
- No. of shows: 114 (118 scheduled)

A "Pre-Construction" tour in April and May took the band around several eastern states. After the release of Fables of the Reconstruction in June, the band traveled to Europe. The following month, they returned to North America for a two-month tour. The "Reconstruction I" tour began in Oregon in July and ended in New Jersey in August.

October's "Reconstruction II" tour took the band back to Europe, beginning in the Netherlands and ending in Scotland.

In November, "Reconstruction III" commenced in Colorado.

=== Setlist ===
The typical setlist for the tour consisted of:

1. "Feeling Gravity's Pull"
2. "Green Grow the Rushes"
3. "Maps and Legends"
4. "Harborcoat"
5. "Hyena"
6. "Driver 8"
7. "Fall on Me"
8. "Good Advices"
9. "Sitting Still"
10. "So. Central Rain"
11. "Have You Ever Seen the Rain?" (Creedence Clearwater Revival cover)
12. "Can't Get There From Here"
13. "7 Chinese Bros."
14. "Auctioneer"
15. "Old Man Kensey"
16. "Pretty Persuasion"
17. "Life and How to Live It"
18. "Little America"
19. "Talk About the Passion"
20. "Second Guessing"
21. "Gardening at Night"
22. "(Don't Go Back to) Rockville"
23. "Toys In the Attic" (Aerosmith cover)
24. "Tired of Singing Trouble"
25. "Theme From Two Steps Onward"
26. "See No Evil" (Television cover)

Date	City	Country	Venue	Opening act(s)
North America ("Pre-Construction" Tour)
April 22, 1985	Athens	United States	Legion Field	The Fleshtones Alex Chilton
April 25, 1985	Lewisburg	United States	Davis Gym	The Neats
April 26, 1985	Vestal	United States	West Gym	The Neats
April 27, 1985	Providence	United States	Pembroke Field	Pablo Moses The Neats
April 28, 1985	Piscataway	United States	Busch Campus Center	Lillo Thomas The Neats
April 30, 1985	Madison	United States	Baldwin Gymnasium	The Neats
May 2, 1985	Princeton	United States	Jadwin Gymnasium	Axel Ericson The Neats
May 3, 1985	Cambridge	United States	New Athletic Center	The Neats
May 4, 1985	Williamstown	United States	Lansing Chapman Rink	The Neats
May 5, 1985	Buffalo	United States	Alumni Arena	Billy Bragg The Neats
May 7, 1985	Springfield	United States	Wittenberg Fieldhouse	The Neats
May 8, 1985	Evanston	United States	McGaw Memorial Hall	The Neats
May 9, 1985	Iowa City	United States	Hancher Auditorium	The Neats
May 10, 1985	Madison	United States	Stock Pavilion	The Neats
May 27, 1985	Raleigh	United States	McIver Amphitheater	N/A
Europe ("Pre-Construction" Tour)
June 22, 1985	Milton Keynes	England	National Bowl	Supporting U2 on 'The Longest Day' bill
June 24, 1985	Manchester	England	International Club	Friends of Gavin supported
June 25, 1985	Edinburgh	Scotland	Coasters	
June 26, 1985	Newcastle	England	Tiffany's Ballroom	
June 27, 1985	Coventry	England	The Workroom	Green on Red (HL) The Jazz Butcher Jonathan Richman
June 29, 1985	Dublin	Ireland	Croke Park	N/A
July 1, 1985	Münster	West Germany	Freibad Hiltrup	N/A
July 3, 1985	West Berlin	West Germany	Reichstagsgelände	N/A
July 6, 1985	Torhout	Belgium	Achiel Eeckloo Rock Meadow	
July 7, 1985	Werchter	Belgium	Festival Park Werchter	
North America - Leg 2
July 11, 1985	Portland	United States	Arlene Schnitzer Concert Hall	True West
July 12, 1985	Seattle	United States	Paramount Theatre	True West
July 13, 1985	Vancouver	Canada	Commodore Ballroom	True West
July 15, 1985	Edmonton	Canada	SUB Theatre	True West
July 16, 1985	Calgary	Canada	MacEwan Hall	True West
July 19, 1985	Fresno	United States	Warnors Theatre	True West The Three O'Clock
July 20, 1985	Berkeley	United States	Hearst Greek Theatre	True West The Three O'Clock
~~July 21, 1985~~	Reno	United States	Pioneer Performing Arts Center	True West The Three O'Clock
~~July 22, 1985~~	Santa Rosa	United States	Sonoma County Fairgrounds	True West The Three O'Clock
July 23, 1985	Santa Cruz	United States	Santa Cruz Civic Auditorium	True West The Three O'Clock
July 24, 1985	Santa Barbara	United States	Arlington Theater	True West The Three O'Clock
July 26, 1985	San Diego	United States	SDSU Open Air Theatre	True West The Three O'Clock
July 27, 1985	Los Angeles	United States	Greek Theatre	True West The Three O'Clock
July 28, 1985	Irvine	United States	Irvine Meadows Amphitheatre	True West The Three O'Clock
July 29, 1985	Phoenix	United States	Palace West	True West
July 31, 1985	San Antonio	United States	Majestic Theatre	True West
August 1, 1985	Austin	United States	City Coliseum	True West
August 2, 1985	Houston	United States	Cullen Performance Hall	True West
August 3, 1985	Dallas	United States	Bronco Bowl	True West
August 5, 1985	Saint Paul	United States	Roy Wilkins Auditorium	The Three O'Clock
August 6, 1985	Milwaukee	United States	MECCA Arena	The Three O'Clock
August 7, 1985	Chicago	United States	UIC Pavilion	The Three O'Clock
August 9, 1985	Kalamazoo	United States	State Theatre	The Three O'Clock
August 10, 1985	Detroit	United States	Fox Theatre	The Three O'Clock The Replacements
August 12, 1985	Cleveland	United States	Cleveland Music Hall	The Three O'Clock
August 13, 1985	Pittsburgh	United States	Syria Mosque	The Three O'Clock
August 15, 1985	Rochester	United States	Auditorium Theatre	The Three O'Clock
August 16, 1985	Toronto	Canada	The Concert Hall	The Three O'Clock
August 17, 1985	Ottawa	Canada	Barrymore's Music Hall	The Three O'Clock
August 18, 1985	Montreal	Canada	The Great Tent	The Three O'Clock
August 20, 1985	Portland	United States	Cumberland County Civic Center	The Three O'Clock
August 21, 1985	Boston	United States	Walter Brown Arena	The Three O'Clock
August 23, 1985	Pawtucket	United States	Leroy Theatre	The Three O'Clock
August 24, 1985	Hartford	United States	Agora Ballroom	The Three O'Clock
August 25, 1985	Albany	United States	JB's Theatre	The Three O'Clock
~~August 26, 1985~~	Baltimore	United States	Lyric Opera House	The Three O'Clock
August 28, 1985	Upper Darby Township	United States	Tower Theater	The Three O'Clock
August 29, 1985	Washington, D.C.	United States	DAR Constitutional Hall	The Three O'Clock
August 30, 1985	Passaic	United States	Capitol Theatre	The Three O'Clock
August 31, 1985	New York City	United States	Radio City Music Hall	The Three O'Clock
Europe - Leg 2
October 1, 1985	Amsterdam	Netherlands	Paradiso	N/A
October 2, 1985	Bochum	West Germany	Zeche Bochum	N/A
October 3, 1985	Rotterdam	Netherlands	Arena	N/A
October 5, 1985	Ghent	Belgium	Vooruit Concert Hall	N/A
October 6, 1985	Frankfurt	West Germany	Batschkapp	N/A
October 7, 1985	Munich	West Germany	Alabama-Halle	N/A
October 9, 1985	West Berlin	West Germany	Metropol	N/A
October 10, 1985	Hamburg	West Germany	Markthalle	N/A
October 11, 1985	Cologne	West Germany	Luxor	N/A
October 13, 1985	Saarbrücken	West Germany	Aula der Universität	N/A
October 14, 1985	Paris	France	L'Eldorado	N/A
October 15, 1985	Lyon	France	Salle Molière	N/A
October 16, 1985	Geneva	Switzerland	Salle du Faubourg	N/A
October 18, 1985	Mannheim	West Germany	Alte Hauptfeuerwache	Silent Agency
October 20, 1985	Manchester	England	The Ritz	The Jazz Butcher Misdemeanor The Faith Brothers
October 21, 1985	Nottingham	England	Rock City	Pleasure Device The Faith Brothers
October 22, 1985	Sheffield	England	Lower Refectory	The Faith Brothers
October 23, 1985	Glasgow	Scotland	Barrowland Ballroom	The Faith Brothers
October 26, 1985	Liverpool	England	Royal Court Theatre	Grown Up Strange The Faith Brothers
October 27, 1985	Birmingham	England	The Powerhouse	The Faith Brothers
October 28, 1985	London	England	Hammersmith Palais	Misdemeanor The Faith Brothers
October 29, 1985	London	England	Hammersmith Palais	The Jazz Butcher The Faith Brothers
North America - Leg 3
November 2, 1985	Boulder	United States	CU Events Center	10,000 Maniacs
November 3, 1985	Laramie	United States	Arts & Science Auditorium	10,000 Maniacs
November 5, 1985	Omaha	United States	Omaha Music Hall	10,000 Maniacs
November 6, 1985	Kansas City	United States	Memorial Hall	10,000 Maniacs
November 7, 1985	Champaign	United States	Assembly Hall	10,000 Maniacs
November 8, 1985	Bloomington	United States	Indiana University Auditorium	10,000 Maniacs
November 11, 1985	Lexington	United States	Memorial Coliseum	10,000 Maniacs
November 12, 1985	Nashville	United States	Memorial Gymnasium	10,000 Maniacs
November 13, 1985	Memphis	United States	Orpheum Theatre	10,000 Maniacs
November 15, 1985	Ames	United States	Stephens Auditorium	10,000 Maniacs
November 16, 1985	Urbana	United States	Foellinger Auditorium	10,000 Maniacs
November 17, 1985	St. Louis	United States	Kiel Opera House	10,000 Maniacs
November 19, 1985	New Orleans	United States	Saenger Performing Arts Theatre	10,000 Maniacs
November 21, 1985	Tuscaloosa	United States	Foster Auditorium	10,000 Maniacs
~~November 22, 1985~~	Tallahassee	United States	Leon County Civic Center	The Minutemen
November 23, 1985	Jacksonville	United States	Swisher Gymnasium	The Minutemen
November 24, 1985	Miami	United States	James L. Knight Center	The Minutemen
November 26, 1985	St. Petersburg	United States	Bayfront Theater	The Minutemen
November 27, 1985	Savannah	United States	Johnny Mercer Theater	The Minutemen
November 29, 1985	Atlanta	United States	Fox Theatre	Jason & The Scorchers The Minutemen
November 30, 1985	Atlanta	United States	Fox Theatre	Jason & The Scorchers The Minutemen
December 2, 1985	Raleigh	United States	Raleigh Civic Center	The Minutemen
December 3, 1985	Columbia	United States	Township Auditorium	The Minutemen
December 4, 1985	Norfolk	United States	Chrysler Hall	The Minutemen
December 5, 1985	Richmond	United States	The Mosque	The Minutemen
December 6, 1985	Lexington	United States	Doremus Memorial Gymnasium	The Minutemen
December 8, 1985	Winston-Salem	United States	R.J. Reynolds Memorial Auditorium	The Minutemen
December 9, 1985	Radford	United States	Dedmon Center	The Minutemen
December 10, 1985	Columbus	United States	Veterans Memorial Auditorium	The Minutemen
December 11, 1985	Indianapolis	United States	Clowes Memorial Hall	The Minutemen
December 13, 1985	Charlotte	United States	Park Center	The Minutemen

== 1986 ==
=== Pageantry Tour ===
Pageantry Tour
- Tour by R.E.M.
- Location: North America
- Associated album: Lifes Rich Pageant
- Start date: September 5, 1986
- End date: November 26, 1986
- Legs: 1
- No. of shows: 63 (64 scheduled)

"Pageantry Tour", in support of Lifes Rich Pageant.

=== Setlist ===
The typical setlist for the tour consisted of:

1. "These Days"
2. "Harborcoat"
3. "Hyena"
4. "Sitting Still"
5. "The One I Love"
6. "Shaking Through"
7. "Feeling Gravity's Pull"
8. "The Flowers of Guatemala"
9. "Maps and Legends"
10. "Driver 8"
11. "I Believe"
12. "Swan Swan H"
13. "7 Chinese Bros."
14. "Superman" (The Clique cover)
15. "Can't Get There From Here"
16. "Old Man Kensey"
17. "Pretty Persuasion"
18. "Auctioneer"
19. "Cuyahoga"
20. "Fall on Me"
21. "Little America"
22. "Just a Touch"
23. "Strange" (Wire cover)
24. "Begin the Begin"
25. "Oddfellows Local 151"
26. "Funtime" (Iggy Pop cover)
27. "So. Central Rain"
Originals

Chronic Town

- "1,000,000"
- "Wolves, Lower"

Chronic Town

- "Gardening at Night"
- "1,000,000"

Murmur

- "Moral Kiosk"
- "Pilgrimage"
- "Radio Free Europe"
- "Sitting Still"
- "Shaking Through"
- "Talk About the Passion"
- "We Walk"
- "West of the Fields"

Reckoning

- "(Don't Go Back To) Rockville"
- "7 Chinese Bros."
- "Harborcoat"
- "Letter Never Sent"
- "Little America"
- "Pretty Persuasion"
- "Second Guessing"
- "So. Central Rain (I'm Sorry)"
- "Time After Time (AnnElise)"

Fables of the Reconstruction

- "Auctioneer (Another Engine)"
- "Can't Get There from Here"
- "Driver 8"
- "Feeling Gravitys Pull"
- "Green Grow the Rushes"
- "Kohoutek"
- "Life and How to Live It"
- "Maps and Legends"
- "Old Man Kensey"

Lifes Rich Pageant

- "Begin the Begin"
- "Cuyahoga"
- "Fall on Me"
- "The Flowers of Guatemala"
- "I Believe"
- "Just a Touch"
- "Superman" (The Clique cover)
- "Swan Swan H"
- "These Days"
- "Tired of Singing Trouble" (1993 I.R.S. Vintage Years edition)
- "Underneath the Bunker"

Dead Letter Office

- "Bandwagon"
- "Burning Hell"
- "Crazy" (1992 IRS Vintage Years edition; Pylon cover)
- "Rotary Ten"
- "Toys in the Attic" (Aerosmith song)
- "There She Goes Again" (1992 The IRS Vintage Years edition; Velvet Underground cover)
- "White Tornado"

Document

- "Finest Worksong"
- "It's the End of the World as We Know It (And I Feel Fine)
- "King of Birds"
- "Lightnin' Hopkins"
- "Oddfellows Local 151"
- "The One I Love"
- "Strange" (Wire cover)

In Time: The Best of R.E.M. 1988–2003

- "Bad Day"

Other (non-album songs)

- "John the Revelator"
- "Singing Cage"
- "Title"

Cover songs

- "After Hours"
- "All I Have to Do Is Dream"
- "All Tomorrow's Parties"
- "Barney Miller Theme"
- "Born to Run"
- "California Dreamin'"
- "Eight Miles High"
- "Femme Fatale"
- "Funtime"
- "Ghost Riders in the Sky"
- "Goo Goo Muck"
- "Have You Ever Seen the Rain?"
- "I Can Only Give You Everything"
- "I Wanna Be Your Dog"
- "King of the Road"
- "Last Date"
- "Long Legged Girl"
- "Mississippi Queen"
- "Paint It Black"
- "Pills"
- "Pipeline"
- "Radar Love"
- "Red Rain"
- "Sad Lover's Waltz"
- "See No Evil"
- "Sloop John B"
- "So You Want to Be a Rock'n'Roll Star"
- "Spooky"
- "Sweet Jane"
- "Walk, Don't Run"
- "We Don't Need Another Hero (Thunderdome)"
- "Whole Lotta Love"
- "Will It Go 'Round in Circles"

Date	City	Country	Venue	Opening act(s)
September 5, 1986	Pelham	United States	Oak Mountain Amphitheatre	Fetchin' Bones
September 6, 1986	Bloomington	United States	Indiana University Auditorium	Fetchin' Bones
September 7, 1986	Cincinnati	United States	Taft Theatre	Fetchin' Bones
September 8, 1986	Louisville	United States	Memorial Auditorium	Fetchin' Bones
September 10, 1986	Nashville	United States	Grand Ole Opry House	Fetchin' Bones
September 11, 1986	Jackson	United States	Municipal Auditorium	Fetchin' Bones
September 12, 1986	New Orleans	United States	Saenger Performing Arts Theatre	Fetchin' Bones
September 13, 1986	Memphis	United States	Mud Island Amphitheater	Fetchin' Bones
September 15, 1986	Little Rock	United States	Robinson Center Music Hall	Fetchin' Bones
September 17, 1986	Oklahoma City	United States	Civic Center Music Hall	Fetchin' Bones
September 18, 1986	Austin	United States	City Coliseum	Fetchin' Bones
September 19, 1986	Houston	United States	Southern Star Amphitheatre	Fetchin' Bones
September 20, 1986	Dallas	United States	Fair Park Bandshell	Fetchin' Bones
September 22, 1986	Las Cruces	United States	Pan American Center	Guadalcanal Diary
September 23, 1986	Mesa	United States	Mesa Amphitheatre	Guadalcanal Diary
September 24, 1986	Costa Mesa	United States	Pacific Amphitheatre	Guadalcanal Diary
~~September 26, 1986~~	Berkeley	United States	Hearst Greek Theatre	Guadalcanal Diary
September 27, 1986	Santa Barbara	United States	Santa Barbara Bowl	Guadalcanal Diary
September 28, 1986	San Diego	United States	UCSD Gymnasium	Guadalcanal Diary
September 30, 1986	Universal City	United States	Universal Amphitheatre	Guadalcanal Diary
October 1, 1986	Oakland	United States	Oakland-Alameda County Arena	Guadalcanal Diary
October 2, 1986	Eugene	United States	EMU Ballroom	Guadalcanal Diary
October 3, 1986	Portland	United States	Portland Civic Auditorium	Guadalcanal Diary
October 4, 1986	Seattle	United States	Paramount Theatre	Guadalcanal Diary
October 5, 1986	Vancouver	Canada	War Memorial Gymnasium	Guadalcanal Diary
October 7, 1986	Salt Lake City	United States	Utah State Fairgrounds Coliseum	Guadalcanal Diary
October 9, 1986	Boulder	United States	CU Events Center	Camper Van Beethoven
October 10, 1986	Lincoln	United States	Pershing Center	Camper Van Beethoven
October 11, 1986	Kansas City	United States	Memorial Hall	Camper Van Beethoven
October 12, 1986	St. Louis	United States	Kiel Opera House	Camper Van Beethoven
October 14, 1986	Saint Paul	United States	Roy Wilkins Auditorium	Camper Van Beethoven
October 15, 1986	Iowa City	United States	Hancher Auditorium	Camper Van Beethoven
October 17, 1986	Milwaukee	United States	Oriental Theatre	Camper Van Beethoven
October 18, 1986	Grand Rapids	United States	Welsh Auditorium	Camper Van Beethoven
October 19, 1986	Chicago	United States	UIC Pavilion	Camper Van Beethoven
October 21, 1986	DeKalb	United States	Chick Evans Fieldhouse	Camper Van Beethoven
October 22, 1986	Detroit	United States	Fox Theatre	Camper Van Beethoven
October 23, 1986	Cleveland	United States	Public Auditorium	Camper Van Beethoven
October 24, 1986	Pittsburgh	United States	Syria Mosque	Camper Van Beethoven
October 26, 1986	Buffalo	United States	Shea's Performing Arts Center	Throwing Muses
October 27, 1986	Toronto	Canada	Massey Hall	The Feelies
October 29, 1986	Montreal	Canada	Maurice-Richard Arena	The Feelies
October 30, 1986	Durham	United States	Lundholm Gymnasium	The Feelies
October 31, 1986	Burlington	United States	Patrick Gymnasium	The Feelies
November 1, 1986	Boston	United States	Wang Theatre	The Feelies
November 2, 1986	Boston	United States	Wang Theatre	The Feelies
November 4, 1986	Portland	United States	Cumberland County Civic Center	The Feelies
November 6, 1986	New York City	United States	Felt Forum	The Feelies
November 7, 1986	New York City	United States	Felt Forum	The Feelies
November 8, 1986	New Haven	United States	New Haven Coliseum	The Feelies
November 9, 1986	Philadelphia	United States	Spectrum Theatre	The Feelies
November 11, 1986	Charlottesville	United States	University Hall	Let's Active
November 12, 1986	Washington, D.C.	United States	Charles E. Smith Center	Let's Active
November 14, 1986	Williamsburg	United States	William and Mary Hall	Let's Active
November 15, 1986	Durham	United States	Cameron Indoor Stadium	Let's Active
November 16, 1986	Wilmington	United States	Trask Coliseum	Let's Active
November 17, 1986	Columbia	United States	Township Auditorium	Let's Active
November 19, 1986	Statesboro	United States	Hanner Fieldhouse	Let's Active
November 20, 1986	Jacksonville	United States	Jacksonville Civic Auditorium	Let's Active
November 21, 1986	St. Petersburg	United States	Bayfront Center	Let's Active
November 22, 1986	Miami	United States	James L. Knight Center	Let's Active
November 24, 1986	Atlanta	United States	Fox Theatre	Let's Active
November 25, 1986	Atlanta	United States	Fox Theatre	Let's Active
November 26, 1986	Atlanta	United States	Fox Theatre	Let's Active

== 1987 ==
=== Work Tour ===
Work Tour
- Tour by R.E.M.
- Location: North America, Europe
- Associated album: Document
- Start date: September 12, 1987
- End date: November 28, 1987
- Legs: 2
- No. of shows: 49

"Work Tour", in support of the album Document. R.E.M. did not perform any shows throughout the following year, and signed to Warner Bros. for the release of their sixth studio album, Green. R.E.M. remained with Warner Bros. until their breakup in 2011.

=== Setlist ===
The typical setlist for the tour consisted of:

1. "Finest Worksong"
2. "These Days"
3. "Welcome to the Occupation"
4. "Exhuming McCarthy"
5. "Orange Crush"
6. "Feeling Gravity's Pull"
7. "Disturbance at the Heron House"
8. "King of Birds"
9. "I Believe"
10. "Cuyahoga"
11. "Driver 8"
12. "Sitting Still"
13. "Superman" (The Clique cover)
14. "Oddfellows Local 151"
15. "Pretty Persuasion"
16. "It's the End of the World as We Know It"
17. "Auctioneer"
18. "Begin the Begin"
19. "The Flowers of Guatemala"
20. "Fall on Me"
21. "Just a Touch"
22. "Strange" (Wire cover)
23. "The One I Love"
24. "Pop Song '89"
25. "See No Evil" (Television cover)
26. "Harpers" (Hugo Largo cover)
27. "Crazy" (Pylon cover)
Originals

Chronic Town

- "1,000,000"
- "Wolves, Lower"

Murmur

- "Moral Kiosk"
- "Pilgrimage"
- "Radio Free Europe"
- "Sitting Still"
- "We Walk"
- "West of the Fields"

Reckoning

- "(Don't Go Back To) Rockville"
- "Harborcoat"
- "Little America"
- "Pretty Persuasion"
- "So. Central Rain (I'm Sorry)"
- "Time After Time (AnnElise)"

Fables of the Reconstruction

- "Auctioneer (Another Engine)"
- "Driver 8"
- "Feeling Gravitys Pull"
- "Good Advices"
- "Life and How to Live It"
- "Maps and Legends"

Lifes Rich Pageant

- "Begin the Begin"
- "Cuyahoga"
- "Fall on Me"
- "The Flowers of Guatemala"
- "I Believe"
- "Just a Touch"
- "Superman" (The Clique cover)
- "Swan Swan H"
- "These Days"
- "Tired of Singing Trouble" (1993 I.R.S. Vintage Years edition)
- "Underneath the Bunker"

Dead Letter Office

- "Crazy" (1992 IRS Vintage Years edition; Pylon cover)
- "White Tornado"

Document

- "Disturbance at the Heron House"
- "Exhuming McCarthy"
- "Finest Worksong"
- "Fireplace"
- "It's the End of the World as We Know It (And I Feel Fine)
- "King of Birds"
- "Lightnin' Hopkins"
- "Oddfellows Local 151"
- "The One I Love"
- "Strange" (Wire cover)
- "Welcome to the Occupation"

Green

- "Orange Crush"
- "Pop Song 89"

Cover songs

Date	City	Country	Venue	Opening act(s)
Europe
September 12, 1987	London	England	Hammersmith Odeon	10,000 Maniacs
September 14, 1987	Utrecht	Netherlands	Muziekcentrum Vredenburg	The Railway Children
September 16, 1987	Paris	France	La Cigale	The Railway Children
September 18, 1987	Düsseldorf	West Germany	Tor 3	The Railway Children
North America
October 1, 1987	Knoxville	United States	Stokely Athletic Center	10,000 Maniacs
October 2, 1987	Clemson	United States	Littlejohn Coliseum	10,000 Maniacs
October 3, 1987	Durham	United States	Cameron Indoor Stadium	10,000 Maniacs
October 4, 1987	Durham	United States	Cameron Indoor Stadium	10,000 Maniacs
October 6, 1987	New York City	United States	Radio City Music Hall	10,000 Maniacs
October 7, 1987	New York City	United States	Radio City Music Hall	10,000 Maniacs
October 9, 1987	Williamsburg	United States	William & Mary Hall	10,000 Maniacs
October 10, 1987	Fairfax	United States	Patriot Center	10,000 Maniacs
October 11, 1987	State College	United States	Recreation Hall	10,000 Maniacs
October 12, 1987	Charlottesville	United States	University Hall	10,000 Maniacs
October 14, 1987	Charleston	United States	Charleston Municipal Auditorium	10,000 Maniacs
October 16, 1987	Philadelphia	United States	The Spectrum	10,000 Maniacs
October 17, 1987	New Haven	United States	New Haven Coliseum	10,000 Maniacs
October 18, 1987	Worcester	United States	The Centrum	10,000 Maniacs
October 19, 1987	Providence	United States	Providence Performing Arts Center	10,000 Maniacs
October 21, 1987	Rochester	United States	Rochester Community War Memorial	10,000 Maniacs
October 22, 1987	Piscataway	United States	Louis Brown Athletic Center	10,000 Maniacs
October 23, 1987	Pittsburgh	United States	Civic Arena	10,000 Maniacs
October 24, 1987	Columbus	United States	Veterans Memorial Auditorium	10,000 Maniacs
October 26, 1987	Lansing	United States	MSU Auditorium	10,000 Maniacs
October 27, 1987	West Lafayette	United States	Elliott Hall of Music	10,000 Maniacs
October 29, 1987	Ann Arbor	United States	Crisler Arena	The dB's
October 30, 1987	Oxford	United States	Millett Hall	The dB's
October 31, 1987	Davenport	United States	Palmer Auditorium	The dB's
November 2, 1987	Saint Paul	United States	Roy Wilkins Auditorium	The dB's
November 3, 1987	Madison	United States	Dane County Coliseum	The dB's
November 4, 1987	Chicago	United States	UIC Pavilion	The dB's
November 5, 1987	Chicago	United States	UIC Pavilion	The dB's
November 7, 1987	Champaign	United States	Assembly Hall	The dB's
November 8, 1987	Kansas City	United States	Memorial Hall	The dB's
November 9, 1987	Lincoln	United States	Pershing Center	The dB's
November 10, 1987	St. Louis	United States	Fox Theatre	The dB's
November 13, 1987	Oakland	United States	Oakland-Alameda County Arena	The dB's
November 14, 1987	Irvine	United States	Bren Events Center	The dB's
November 15, 1987	Universal City	United States	Universal Amphitheatre	The dB's
November 16, 1987	Tempe	United States	Gammage Memorial Auditorium	The dB's
November 18, 1987	Dallas	United States	Moody Coliseum	The dB's
November 19, 1987	College Station	United States	G. Rollie White Coliseum	The dB's
November 20, 1987	Houston	United States	Sam Houston Coliseum	The dB's
November 22, 1987	Oxford	United States	Tad Smith Coliseum	The dB's
November 23, 1987	Auburn	United States	Joel H. Eaves Memorial Coliseum	The dB's
November 24, 1987	Atlanta	United States	Fox Theatre	The dB's
November 25, 1987	Atlanta	United States	Fox Theatre	The dB's
November 27, 1987	Atlanta	United States	Fox Theatre	The dB's
November 28, 1987	Atlanta	United States	Fox Theatre	The dB's

== 1989 ==
=== Green Tour ===
Green Tour
- Tour by R.E.M.
- Location: North America, Europe, Asia, Oceania
- Associated album: Green
- Start date: January 26, 1989
- End date: November 13, 1989
- Legs: 5
- No. of shows: 131 (135 scheduled)

R.E.M.'s first major tour, as well as their biggest most visually developed tour to date, featured back-projections and art films playing on the stage during the band's shows. The tour featured Peter Holsapple of the dB's as an auxiliary musician on guitar, keys and vocals as needed. Subsequent tours would further feature backing musicians assuming instrumental roles, especially after Bill Berry's departure in 1997.

The final show of the tour, at the Fox Theatre in Atlanta, featured the band performing their first full-length album, Murmur in order, from start to finish, followed by Green in order, from start to finish. The night was concluded by an encore set performed by Mike & the Melons with Michael Stipe fronting the road crew. It marked the only live performance of "The Wrong Child", and one of the few live performances of "Hairshirt".

A concert video called Tourfilm is a compilation of footage from various locations on these tours.

R.E.M. would not tour again until 1995, following the release of Monster the previous year.

The typical setlist consisted of:

1. "Pop Song '89"
2. "Welcome to the Occupation"
3. "Exhuming McCarthy"
4. "The One I Love"
5. "Turn You Inside Out"
6. "Disturbance at the Heron House"
7. "Orange Crush"
8. "Feeling Gravity's Pull"
9. "Belong"
10. "Sitting Still"
11. "World Leader Pretend"
12. "These Days"
13. "Stand"
14. "Pretty Persuasion"
15. "I Believe"
16. "Get Up"
17. "Begin the Begin"
18. "Auctioneer"
19. "It's The End of the World as We Know It"
20. "Fall on Me"
21. "King of Birds"
22. "Crazy" (Pylon cover)
23. "You Are the Everything"
24. "Finest Worksong"
25. "Perfect Circle"
26. "Dark Globe" (Syd Barrett cover)
27. "Harpers" (Hugo Largo cover)
28. "See No Evil" (Television cover)
29. "After Hours" (The Velvet Underground cover)
Originals

Chronic Town

- "1,000,000"
- "Wolves, Lower"

Murmur

- "Catapult"
- "Laughing"
- "Moral Kiosk"
- "9-9"
- "Perfect Circle"
- "Pilgrimage"
- "Radio Free Europe"
- "Shaking Through"
- "Sitting Still"
- "Talk About the Passion"
- "We Walk"
- "West of the Fields"

Reckoning

- "Letter Never Sent"
- "Little America"
- "Moon River" (1992 I.R.S. Vintage Years edition; Henry Mancini cover)
- "Pretty Persuasion"
- "So. Central Rain (I'm Sorry)"
- "Time After Time (AnnElise)"

Fables of the Reconstruction

- "Auctioneer (Another Engine)"
- "Driver 8"
- "Feeling Gravitys Pull"
- "Good Advices"
- "Life and How to Live It"
- "Maps and Legends"

Lifes Rich Pageant

- "Begin the Begin"
- "Cuyahoga"
- "Fall on Me"
- "The Flowers of Guatemala"
- "I Believe"
- "Just a Touch"
- "Superman" (The Clique cover)
- "Swan Swan H"
- "These Days"
- "Tired of Singing Trouble" (1993 I.R.S. Vintage Years edition)
- "Underneath the Bunker"

Dead Letter Office

- "Crazy" (1992 IRS Vintage Years edition; Pylon cover)
- "Rotary Ten"
- "There She Goes Again" (1992 The IRS Vintage Years edition; Velvet Underground cover)
- "White Tornado"

Document

- "Disturbance at the Heron House"
- "Exhuming McCarthy"
- "Finest Worksong"
- "It's the End of the World as We Know It (And I Feel Fine)
- "King of Birds"
- "Oddfellows Local 151"
- "The One I Love"
- "Strange" (Wire cover)
- "Welcome to the Occupation"

Green

- "11"
- "Get Up"
- "Hairshirt"
- "I Remember California"
- "Orange Crush"
- "Pop Song 89"
- "Stand"
- "Turn You Inside-Out"
- "World Leader Pretend"
- "The Wrong Child"
- "You Are the Everything"

Out of Time

- "Belong"
- "Low"

Other (non-album songs)

- "Dust Bowl"
- "Go Daniel"
- "Hot Day"
- "Stony River"

Cover songs

- "Academy Fight Song"
- "After Hours"
- "Ain't No Sunshine"
- "Another Brick in the Wall Part 2"
- "Behind Closed Doors"
- "Born to Run"
- "Boy (Go)
- "Dark Globe"
- "Falling in Love Again"
- "Funtime"
- "Future 40's (String of Pearls)"
- "Ghost Rider"
- "Happy Birthday"
- "Harpers"
- "Have You Ever Seen the Rain?"
- "Let's Stay Together"
- "Paint It Black"
- "Radar Love"
- "Red Rain"
- "Rock On"
- "See No Evil"
- "Skin Tight"
- "Spooky"
- "Streets of Your Town"
- "Summertime"
- "Tusk"
- "We Live as We Dream, Alone"
- "Wild Thing"
- "With a Girl Like You"
- "With the People"
- "Word Up"

Date	City	Country	Venue	Opening act(s)
Japan
January 26, 1989	Tokyo	Japan	Sound Colosseum MZA	N/A
January 27, 1989	Tokyo	Japan	Sound Colosseum MZA	N/A
Oceania
February 2, 1989	Christchurch	New Zealand	Christchurch Town Hall	The Bats
February 3, 1989	Wellington	New Zealand	Wellington Town Hall	Let's Planet
February 4, 1989	Auckland	New Zealand	Logan Campbell Center	Straitjacket Fits
February 9, 1989	Perth	Australia	Perth Concert Hall	The Go-Betweens
February 11, 1989	Adelaide	Australia	Thebarton Theatre	The Go-Betweens
February 12, 1989	Melbourne	Australia	Festival Hall	The Go-Betweens
February 15, 1989	Brisbane	Australia	Brisbane Festival Hall	The Go-Betweens
February 17, 1989	Sydney	Australia	Hordern Pavilion	The Go-Betweens
United States
March 1, 1989	Louisville	United States	Louisville Gardens	Robyn Hitchcock & The Egyptians
March 2, 1989	Carbondale	United States	SIU Arena	Robyn Hitchcock & The Egyptians
March 3, 1989	St. Louis	United States	St. Louis Arena	Robyn Hitchcock & The Egyptians
March 4, 1989	Kansas City	United States	Kemper Arena	Robyn Hitchcock & The Egyptians
March 6, 1989	Rosemont	United States	Rosemont Horizon	Robyn Hitchcock & The Egyptians
March 7, 1989	Iowa City	United States	Carver–Hawkeye Arena	Robyn Hitchcock & The Egyptians
March 8, 1989	Bloomington	United States	Met Center	Robyn Hitchcock & The Egyptians
March 10, 1989	Omaha	United States	Omaha Civic Auditorium	Robyn Hitchcock & The Egyptians
March 13, 1989	Sacramento	United States	ARCO Arena	Robyn Hitchcock & The Egyptians
March 14, 1989	Oakland	United States	Oakland-Alameda County Arena	Robyn Hitchcock & The Egyptians
March 15, 1989	Inglewood	United States	Great Western Forum	Robyn Hitchcock & The Egyptians
March 16, 1989	San Diego	United States	San Diego Sports Arena	Robyn Hitchcock & The Egyptians
March 18, 1989	Tempe	United States	ASU Activity Center	Robyn Hitchcock & The Egyptians
March 20, 1989	San Antonio	United States	San Antonio Municipal Auditorium	Robyn Hitchcock & The Egyptians
March 21, 1989	Austin	United States	Frank Erwin Center	Robyn Hitchcock & The Egyptians
March 22, 1989	Dallas	United States	Reunion Arena	Robyn Hitchcock & The Egyptians
March 23, 1989	Houston	United States	The Summit	Robyn Hitchcock & The Egyptians
March 25, 1989	Shreveport	United States	Hirsch Memorial Coliseum	The Indigo Girls
March 27, 1989	New Orleans	United States	Kiefer UNO Lakefront Arena	The Indigo Girls
March 28, 1989	Birmingham	United States	BJCC Coliseum	The Indigo Girls
March 30, 1989	Memphis	United States	Mid-South Coliseum	The Indigo Girls
March 31, 1989	Murfreesboro	United States	Murphy Center	The Indigo Girls
April 1, 1989	Atlanta	United States	The Omni	The Indigo Girls
April 2, 1989	Atlanta	United States	The Omni	The Indigo Girls
April 4, 1989	Cincinnati	United States	Riverfront Coliseum	The Indigo Girls
April 5, 1989	Detroit	United States	Cobo Arena	The Indigo Girls
April 6, 1989	Richfield	United States	Richfield Coliseum	The Indigo Girls
April 7, 1989	Morgantown	United States	WVU Coliseum	The Indigo Girls
April 9, 1989	Worcester	United States	The Centrum	The Indigo Girls
April 10, 1989	New York City	United States	Madison Square Garden	The Indigo Girls
April 11, 1989	Syracuse	United States	Onondaga War Memorial Auditorium	The Indigo Girls
April 12, 1989	Toronto	Canada	Maple Leaf Gardens	The Indigo Girls
April 14, 1989	Montreal	Canada	Montreal Forum	The Indigo Girls
April 15, 1989	Portland	United States	Cumberland County Civic Center	Drivin' 'n' Cryin'
April 16, 1989	Boston	United States	Boston Garden	Drivin' 'n' Cryin'
April 18, 1989	Landover	United States	Capital Centre	Drivin' 'n' Cryin'
April 20, 1989	Philadelphia	United States	The Spectrum	Drivin' 'n' Cryin'
April 21, 1989	Richmond	United States	Richmond Coliseum	Drivin' 'n' Cryin'
April 22, 1989	Chapel Hill	United States	Dean Smith Center	Drivin' 'n' Cryin'
April 23, 1989	Charlotte	United States	Charlotte Coliseum	Drivin' 'n' Cryin'
April 25, 1989	Columbia	United States	Carolina Coliseum	Drivin' 'n' Cryin'
April 26, 1989	Savannah	United States	Savannah Civic Center	Drivin' 'n' Cryin'
April 28, 1989	Tampa	United States	USF Sun Dome	Drivin' 'n' Cryin'
April 29, 1989	Miami	United States	Miami Arena	Drivin' 'n' Cryin'
April 30, 1989	Orlando	United States	Orlando Arena	Drivin' 'n' Cryin'
~~May 2, 1989~~	Tallahassee	United States	Leon County Civic Center	Drivin' 'n' Cryin'
~~May 3, 1989~~	Huntsville	United States	Von Braun Civic Center	Drivin' 'n' Cryin'
~~May 6, 1989~~	Athens	United States	Sanford Stadium	Drivin' 'n' Cryin'
Europe
May 9, 1989	Düsseldorf	West Germany	Philipshalle	The Go-Betweens
~~May 12, 1989~~	Bielefeld	West Germany	PC69	The Go-Betweens
May 15, 1989	Landgraaf	Netherlands	Pinkpop Festival	
May 17, 1989	Leicester	England	De Montfort Hall	The Blue Aeroplanes
May 18, 1989	Newport	Wales	Newport Centre	The Blue Aeroplanes
May 19, 1989	Portsmouth	England	Portsmouth Guildhall	The Blue Aeroplanes
May 21, 1989	Liverpool	England	Royal Court Theatre	The Blue Aeroplanes
May 22, 1989	Nottingham	England	Royal Concert Hall	The Blue Aeroplanes
May 23, 1989	Edinburgh	Scotland	Edinburgh Playhouse	The Blue Aeroplanes
May 24, 1989	Glasgow	Scotland	Barrowland Ballroom	The Blue Aeroplanes
May 26, 1989	Newcastle	England	Newcastle City Hall	The Blue Aeroplanes
May 27, 1989	Manchester	England	Manchester Apollo	Family Cat The Blue Aeroplanes
May 29, 1989	London	England	Hammersmith Odeon	The Blue Aeroplanes
May 30, 1989	London	England	Hammersmith Odeon	The Blue Aeroplanes
May 31, 1989	Birmingham	England	NEC Arena	The Blue Aeroplanes
June 4, 1989	Seinäjoki	Finland	Provinssirock	
June 6, 1989	Stockholm	Sweden	Göta Lejon	N/A
June 7, 1989	Oslo	Norway	Rockefeller Music Hall	N/A
June 8, 1989	Oslo	Norway	Rockefeller Music Hall	N/A
June 9, 1989	Copenhagen	Denmark	Saga Rock Theater	N/A
June 11, 1989	West Berlin	West Germany	Metropol	The Go-Betweens
June 13, 1989	Zurich	Switzerland	Volkshaus	The Go-Betweens
June 15, 1989	Milan	Italy	PalaTrussardi	The Go-Betweens
June 16, 1989	Bologna	Italy	PalaDozza	The Go-Betweens
June 17, 1989	Perugia	Italy	PalaEvangelisti	
June 20, 1989	Paris	France	Le Grand Rex	The Go-Betweens
June 22, 1989	London	England	Wembley Arena	Throwing Muses
June 24, 1989	Dublin	Ireland	RDS Simmonscourt Pavilion	The Go-Betweens
June 27, 1989	Hamburg	West Germany	Große Freiheit 36	The Go-Betweens
June 28, 1989	Frankfurt	West Germany	Kongresshalle	The Go-Betweens
June 29, 1989	Munich	West Germany	Circus Krone	The Go-Betweens
July 1, 1989	Torhout	Belgium	Torhout Festival	
July 2, 1989	Rotselaar	Belgium	Werchter Festival	
North America - Leg 2
September 8, 1989	Indianapolis	United States	Market Square Arena	Throwing Muses
September 9, 1989	Clarkston	United States	Pine Knob Music Theater	Throwing Muses
September 10, 1989	Pittsburgh	United States	Civic Arena	Throwing Muses
September 12, 1989	Buffalo	United States	Buffalo Memorial Auditorium	Throwing Muses
September 13, 1989	Hartford	United States	Hartford Civic Center	Throwing Muses
September 15, 1989	Boston	United States	Great Woods Performing Arts Center	Throwing Muses
September 16, 1989	Boston	United States	Great Woods Performing Arts Center	Throwing Muses
September 17, 1989	Philadelphia	United States	Mann Music Center	Throwing Muses
September 19, 1989	East Rutherford	United States	Brendan Byrne Arena	Throwing Muses
September 20, 1989	Uniondale	United States	Nassau Coliseum	Throwing Muses
September 22, 1989	Columbia	United States	Merriweather Post Pavilion	Throwing Muses
September 23, 1989	Columbia	United States	Merriweather Post Pavilion	Throwing Muses
September 26, 1989	Dayton	United States	University of Dayton Arena	NRBQ
September 27, 1989	Champaign	United States	Assembly Hall	NRBQ
September 29, 1989	South Bend	United States	Edmund P. Joyce Center	NRBQ
September 30, 1989	East Troy	United States	Alpine Valley Music Theater	NRBQ
October 1, 1989	Ames	United States	Hilton Coliseum	NRBQ
October 3, 1989	Lincoln	United States	Pershing Center	NRBQ
October 5, 1989	Denver	United States	McNichols Sports Arena	NRBQ
October 7, 1989	Salt Lake City	United States	Salt Palace	NRBQ
October 8, 1989	Boise	United States	BSU Pavilion	NRBQ
October 10, 1989	Pullman	United States	Beasley Coliseum	NRBQ
October 11, 1989	Seattle	United States	Seattle Center Coliseum	NRBQ
October 13, 1989	Portland	United States	Memorial Coliseum	NRBQ
October 14, 1989	Vancouver	Canada	Pacific Coliseum	NRBQ
October 16, 1989	Anchorage	United States	Sullivan Sports Arena	NRBQ
October 18, 1989	Costa Mesa	United States	Pacific Amphitheatre	NRBQ
October 20, 1989	Concord	United States	Concord Pavilion	NRBQ
October 21, 1989	Mountain View	United States	Shoreline Amphitheatre	NRBQ
October 24, 1989	Phoenix	United States	Compton Terrace	Pylon
October 25, 1989	Tucson	United States	TCC Arena	Pylon
October 26, 1989	Las Cruces	United States	Pan American Center	Pylon
October 28, 1989	Oklahoma City	United States	Myriad Convention Center	Pylon
October 29, 1989	College Station	United States	G. Rollie White Coliseum	Pylon
October 30, 1989	Baton Rouge	United States	Pete Maravich Assembly Center	Pylon
November 1, 1989	Tallahassee	United States	Leon County Civic Center	Pylon
November 3, 1989	Chattanooga	United States	UTC Arena	Pylon
November 4, 1989	Knoxville	United States	Thompson-Boling Arena	Pylon
November 5, 1989	Lexington	United States	Rupp Arena	Pylon
November 7, 1989	Roanoke	United States	Roanoke Civic Center	Pylon
November 8, 1989	Hampton	United States	Hampton Coliseum	Pylon
November 10, 1989	Greensboro	United States	Greensboro Coliseum	Pylon
November 11, 1989	Macon	United States	Macon Coliseum	Pylon
November 13, 1989	Atlanta	United States	Fox Theater	Pylon

== 1995 ==
=== Monster Tour ("Aneurysm '95 Tour") ===
Monster Tour
- Tour by R.E.M.
- Location: North America, Europe, Asia, Oceania
- Associated album: Monster
- Start date: January 13, 1995
- End date: November 21, 1995
- Legs: 5
- No. of shows: 135 (165 scheduled)

After refusing to tour in support of their two previous releases, Out of Time and Automatic for the People, the band agreed to tour in support of Monster. The tour was critically and commercially successful, though a handful of shows were either cancelled or postponed due to health problems associated with the band members.

The concert video Road Movie is a compilation of footage taken from the final three nights of the tour, in Atlanta.

New Adventures in Hi-Fi, the band's tenth studio album, was released in 1996 without a supporting tour, though a handful of material was performed during this tour, either during soundcheck or the actual show. Eight-track recorders were brought to capture its shows, and used the recordings as the base elements for that album.

This was the final tour to feature Bill Berry, though he briefly reunited with them during a show in 2003. This was also the first tour to feature involvement from Seattle-based multi-instrumentalist Scott McCaughey, who remained active with the group on recordings of albums from New Adventures in Hi-Fi to Collapse Into Now, as well as subsequent tours.

Originals

Murmur

- "Radio Free Europe"

Reckoning

- "So. Central Rain (I'm Sorry)"

Lifes Rich Pageant

- "Begin the Begin"
- "Fall on Me"

Document

- "Disturbance at the Heron House"
- "Finest Worksong"
- "It's the End of the World as We Know It (And I Feel Fine)"
- "The One I Love"
- "Welcome to the Occupation"

Green

- "Get Up"
- "Orange Crush"
- "Pop Song 89"
- "Turn You Inside-Out"

Out of Time

- "Country Feedback"
- "Half a World Away"
- "Losing My Religion"
- "Me in Honey"
- "Near Wild Heaven"

Automatic for the People

- "Drive"
- "Everybody Hurts"
- "Find the River"
- "Man on the Moon"
- "Monty Got a Raw Deal"
- "Nightswimming"
- "Star Me Kitten"
- "Try Not to Breathe"

The Automatic Box

- "Fretless"

Monster

- "Bang and Blame"
- "Circus Envy"
- "Crush with Eyeliner"
- "I Don't Sleep, I Dream"
- "I Took Your Name"
- "King of Comedy"
- "Let Me In"
- "Star 69"
- "Strange Currencies"
- "Tongue"
- "What's the Frequency, Kenneth?"
- "You"

New Adventures in Hi-Fi

- "Binky the Doormat
- "Departure"
- "Undertow"
- "The Wake-Up Bomb"
- "Zither"

In Time: The Best of R.E.M. 1988–2003

- "Revolution" ('Rarities and B-sides' bonus disc)

Cover songs

- "A Horse With No Name"
- "Another Girl, Another Planet"
- "Atlantis
- "Behind Closed Doors"
- "By the Time I Get to Phoenix"
- "Crimson & Clover"
- "Dancing Barefoot"
- "Doll Parts"
- "Drift Away"
- "(Don't Fear) The Reaper"
- "Ghost Rider"
- "Happy Birthday"
- "Have You Ever Seen the Rain?"
- "I Got You Babe"
- "Java"
- "Landslide"
- "Speed Racer"
- "Sponge"
- "Stars N Stripes"
- "Sweet Caroline"
- "The Beat Goes On"
- "Tusk"
- "Wichita Lineman"
- "Wicked Game"
- "Wild Thing"
- "Winter"

Date	City	Country	Venue	Opening act(s)
Pacific Rim
January 13, 1995	Perth	Australia	Perth Entertainment Centre	Died Pretty Grant Lee Buffalo
January 14, 1995	Perth	Australia	Perth Entertainment Centre	Died Pretty Grant Lee Buffalo
January 16, 1995	Adelaide	Australia	Adelaide Entertainment Centre	Died Pretty Grant Lee Buffalo
January 18, 1995	Sydney	Australia	Sydney Entertainment Centre	Died Pretty Grant Lee Buffalo
January 19, 1995	Sydney	Australia	Sydney Entertainment Centre	Died Pretty Grant Lee Buffalo
January 20, 1995	Sydney	Australia	Sydney Entertainment Centre	Died Pretty Grant Lee Buffalo
January 22, 1995	Brisbane	Australia	Brisbane Entertainment Centre	Died Pretty Grant Lee Buffalo
January 23, 1995	Brisbane	Australia	Brisbane Entertainment Centre	Died Pretty Grant Lee Buffalo
January 25, 1995	Melbourne	Australia	Sidney Myer Music Bowl	Died Pretty Grant Lee Buffalo
January 26, 1995	Melbourne	Australia	Sidney Myer Music Bowl	Died Pretty Grant Lee Buffalo
January 28, 1995	Auckland	New Zealand	Western Springs Stadium	Grant Lee Buffalo Crowded House
February 1, 1995	Tokyo	Japan	Nippon Budokan	Grant Lee Buffalo
February 2, 1995	Tokyo	Japan	Nippon Budokan	Grant Lee Buffalo
February 4, 1995	Taipei	Taiwan	Plenary Hall	Sissey Chau
February 5, 1995	Wan Chai	Hong Kong	Queen Elizabeth Stadium	N/A
February 7, 1995	Kallang	Singapore	Singapore Indoor Stadium	N/A
Europe
February 15, 1995	San Sebastian	Spain	Velódromo de Anoeta	Grant Lee Buffalo
February 16, 1995	Madrid	Spain	Palacio de Deportes	Grant Lee Buffalo
February 18, 1995	Barcelona	Spain	Palau Sant Jordi	Grant Lee Buffalo
February 19, 1995	Toulon	France	Zénith Omega	Grant Lee Buffalo
February 20, 1995	Turin	Italy	PalaStampa	Grant Lee Buffalo
February 22, 1995	Rome	Italy	Palazzo dello Sport	Grant Lee Buffalo
February 23, 1995	Rome	Italy	Palazzo dello Sport	Grant Lee Buffalo
February 24, 1995	Milan	Italy	Forum di Assago	Grant Lee Buffalo
February 25, 1995	Milan	Italy	Forum di Assago	Grant Lee Buffalo
February 26, 1995	Milan	Italy	Forum di Assago	Grant Lee Buffalo
February 27, 1995	Bologna	Italy	Palasport	Grant Lee Buffalo
March 1, 1995	Lausanne	Switzerland	Patinoire de Malley	Grant Lee Buffalo
~~March 2, 1995~~	Zurich	Switzerland	Hallenstadion	Grant Lee Buffalo
~~March 3, 1995~~	Zurich	Switzerland	Hallenstadion	Grant Lee Buffalo
~~March 5, 1995~~	Toulouse	France	Palais des Sports	Grant Lee Buffalo
~~March 6, 1995~~	Lyon	France	Halle Tony Garnier	Grant Lee Buffalo
~~March 7, 1995~~	Paris	France	Palais Omnisports de Paris Bercy	Grant Lee Buffalo
~~March 9, 1995~~	Amneville		Galaxie Amnéville	Grant Lee Buffalo
~~March 13, 1995~~	Hamburg	Germany	Alsterdorfer Sporthalle	PJ Harvey
~~March 14, 1995~~	Frankfurt	Germany	Festhalle	PJ Harvey
~~March 15, 1995~~	Frankfurt	Germany	Festhalle	PJ Harvey
~~March 17, 1995~~	Stuttgart	Germany	Hanns-Martin-Schleyer-Halle	PJ Harvey
~~March 18, 1995~~	Nuremberg	Germany	Frankenhalle	PJ Harvey
~~March 20, 1995~~	Munich	Germany	Olympiahalle	PJ Harvey
~~March 21, 1995~~	Munich	Germany	Olympiahalle	PJ Harvey
~~March 23, 1995~~	Dortmund	Germany	Westfalenhallen	PJ Harvey
~~March 24, 1995~~	Dortmund	Germany	Westfalenhallen	PJ Harvey
~~March 27, 1995~~	Berlin	Germany	Deutschlandhalle	PJ Harvey
~~March 28, 1995~~	Berlin	Germany	Deutschlandhalle	PJ Harvey
~~March 30, 1995~~	Helsinki	Finland	Helsinki Ice Hall	PJ Harvey
~~April 1, 1995~~	Stockholm	Sweden	Stockholm Globe Arena	PJ Harvey
~~April 2, 1995~~	Gothenburg	Sweden	Scandinavium	PJ Harvey
~~April 5, 1995~~	Copenhagen	Denmark	Forum Copenhagen	PJ Harvey
~~April 7, 1995~~	London	England	Wembley Arena	PJ Harvey
~~April 9, 1995~~	London	England	Wembley Arena	PJ Harvey
~~April 10, 1995~~	London	England	Wembley Arena	PJ Harvey
~~April 11, 1995~~	London	England	Wembley Arena	PJ Harvey
~~April 13, 1995~~	Birmingham	England	NEC Arena	PJ Harvey
~~April 14, 1995~~	Birmingham	England	NEC Arena	PJ Harvey
~~April 16, 1995~~	Glasgow	Scotland	Scottish Exhibition & Conference Center	PJ Harvey
~~April 17, 1995~~	Glasgow	Scotland	Scottish Exhibition & Conference Center	PJ Harvey
~~April 19, 1995~~	Sheffield	England	Sheffield Arena	PJ Harvey
~~April 20, 1995~~	Sheffield	England	Sheffield Arena	PJ Harvey
North America
May 15, 1995	Mountain View	United States	Shoreline Amphitheater	Sonic Youth
May 16, 1995	Mountain View	United States	Shoreline Amphitheater	Sonic Youth
May 17, 1995	Mountain View	United States	Shoreline Amphitheater	Sonic Youth
May 19, 1995	Portland	United States	Portland Memorial Coliseum	Sonic Youth
May 20, 1995	Vancouver	Canada	Pacific Coliseum	Sonic Youth
May 21, 1995	George	United States	The Gorge Amphitheatre	Sonic Youth
May 23, 1995	Salt Lake City	United States	Delta Center	Sonic Youth
May 24, 1995	Greenwood Village	United States	Fiddler's Green Amphitheatre	Sonic Youth
May 25, 1995	Greenwood Village	United States	Fiddler's Green Amphitheatre	Sonic Youth
May 27, 1995	Bonner Springs	United States	Sandstone Amphitheater	Sonic Youth
May 28, 1995	Bonner Springs	United States	Sandstone Amphitheater	Sonic Youth
May 30, 1995	Minneapolis	United States	Target Center	Sonic Youth
May 31, 1995	Milwaukee	United States	Marcus Amphitheater	Luscious Jackson
June 2, 1995	Rosemont	United States	Rosemont Horizon	Luscious Jackson
June 3, 1995	Rosemont	United States	Rosemont Horizon	Luscious Jackson
June 4, 1995	Rosemont	United States	Rosemont Horizon	Luscious Jackson
June 6, 1995	Auburn Hills	United States	The Palace of Auburn Hills	Luscious Jackson
June 7, 1995	Auburn Hills	United States	The Palace of Auburn Hills	Luscious Jackson
June 9, 1995	Columbus	United States	Polaris Amphitheater	Luscious Jackson
June 10, 1995	Pittsburgh	United States	Star Lake Amphitheater	Luscious Jackson
June 11, 1995	Cleveland	United States	Gund Arena	Luscious Jackson
June 13, 1995	Toronto	Canada	Molson Amphitheater	Luscious Jackson
June 14, 1995	Montreal	Canada	Montreal Forum	Luscious Jackson
June 16, 1995	Boston	United States	Great Woods Performing Arts Center	Luscious Jackson
June 17, 1995	Boston	United States	Great Woods Performing Arts Center	Luscious Jackson
June 18, 1995	Boston	United States	Great Woods Performing Arts Center	Luscious Jackson
June 20, 1995	Albany	United States	Knickerbocker Arena	Luscious Jackson
June 22, 1995	New York City	United States	Madison Square Garden	Luscious Jackson
June 23, 1995	New York City	United States	Madison Square Garden	Luscious Jackson
June 24, 1995	New York City	United States	Madison Square Garden	Luscious Jackson
Europe
June 28, 1995	Berlin	Germany	Waldbühne	The Cranberries
June 29, 1995	Roskilde	Denmark	Roskilde Festival	
July 1, 1995	Torhout	Belgium	Torhout Festival	
July 2, 1995	Werchter	Belgium	Werchter Festival	
July 3, 1995	Paris	France	Palais Omnisports de Paris-Bercy	Belly
July 5, 1995	Vienna	Austria	Ernst-Happel-Stadion	The Cranberries
July 7, 1995	Frauenfeld	Switzerland	Out in the Green	
July 8, 1995	Hamburg	Germany	Trabrennbahn Bahrenfeld	The Cranberries Belly
July 9, 1995	Düren	Germany	Badesee Düren	
July 22, 1995	Slane	Ireland	Slane Castle	
July 23, 1995	Cardiff	Wales	Cardiff Arms Park	The Cranberries Belly Del Amitri
July 25, 1995	Huddersfield	England	Alfred McAlpine Stadium	The Beautiful South Belly Magnapop
July 26, 1995	Huddersfield	England	Alfred McAlpine Stadium	The Beautiful South Echobelly Terrorvision
July 27, 1995	Edinburgh	Scotland	Murrayfield Stadium	The Cranberries Belly Michael Franti & Spearhead
July 29, 1995	Milton Keynes	England	National Bowl	Blur Belly Magnapop
July 30, 1995	Milton Keynes	England	National Bowl	The Cranberries Radiohead Sleeper
August 1, 1995	Berlin	Germany	Waldbühne	Radiohead
August 3, 1995	Oslo	Norway	Oslo Spektrum	Radiohead
August 4, 1995	Stockholm	Sweden	Sjöhistoriska Muséet	Radiohead
August 6, 1995	Catania	Italy	Stadio Cibali	Radiohead
August 9, 1995	Ramat Gan	Israel	Ramat Gan Stadium	Radiohead
August 11, 1995	Prague	Czech Republic	Sportovní Hala	Echobelly
North America
September 8, 1995	Miami	United States	Miami Arena	Radiohead
September 9, 1995	St. Petersburg	United States	ThunderDome	Radiohead
September 11, 1995	Antioch	United States	Starwood Amphitheatre	Radiohead
September 12, 1995	Birmingham	United States	BJCC Coliseum	Radiohead
September 13, 1995	Baton Rouge	United States	Pete Maravich Assembly Center	Radiohead
September 15, 1995	The Woodlands	United States	Cynthia Woods Mitchell Pavilion	Radiohead
September 16, 1995	The Woodlands	United States	Cynthia Woods Mitchell Pavilion	Radiohead
September 17, 1995	Austin	United States	South Park Meadows	Radiohead
September 19, 1995	Dallas	United States	Reunion Arena	Radiohead
September 20, 1995	Dallas	United States	Coca-Cola Starplex Amphitheatre	Radiohead
September 22, 1995	Maryland Heights	United States	Riverport Amphitheatre	Radiohead
September 23, 1995	Maryland Heights	United States	Riverport Amphitheatre	Radiohead
September 24, 1995	Tinley Park	United States	New World Music Theatre	Radiohead
September 26, 1995	Noblesville	United States	Deer Creek Music Center	Radiohead
September 27, 1995	East Lansing	United States	Breslin Student Events Center	Radiohead
September 29, 1995	Buffalo	United States	Buffalo Memorial Auditorium	Radiohead
September 30, 1995	Hershey	United States	Hersheypark Stadium	Radiohead
October 1, 1995	Hartford	United States	Meadows Music Theatre	Radiohead
October 3, 1995	Boston	United States	Fleet Center	Grant Lee Buffalo
October 4, 1995	Providence	United States	Providence Civic Center	Grant Lee Buffalo
October 6, 1995	East Rutherford	United States	Brendan Byrne Arena	Grant Lee Buffalo
October 7, 1995	Uniondale	United States	Nassau Coliseum	Grant Lee Buffalo
October 9, 1995	Hampton	United States	Hampton Coliseum	Grant Lee Buffalo
October 10, 1995	Richmond	United States	Richmond Coliseum	Grant Lee Buffalo
October 12, 1995	Philadelphia	United States	CoreStates Spectrum	Grant Lee Buffalo
October 13, 1995	Philadelphia	United States	CoreStates Spectrum	Grant Lee Buffalo
October 14, 1995	Philadelphia	United States	CoreStates Spectrum	Grant Lee Buffalo
October 16, 1995	Landover	United States	USAir Arena	Grant Lee Buffalo
October 17, 1995	Landover	United States	USAir Arena	Grant Lee Buffalo
October 18, 1995	Bristow	United States	Nissan Pavilion	Grant Lee Buffalo
October 20, 1995	Lexington	United States	Rupp Arena	Luscious Jackson Grant Lee Buffalo
October 21, 1995	Cincinnati	United States	Riverfront Coliseum	Grant Lee Buffalo
October 22, 1995	Ann Arbor	United States	Crisler Arena	Grant Lee Buffalo
October 24, 1995	Ames	United States	Hilton Coliseum	Grant Lee Buffalo
October 27, 1995	Las Vegas	United States	Thomas & Mack Center	Luscious Jackson Grant Lee Buffalo
October 28, 1995	San Diego	United States	San Diego Sports Arena	Luscious Jackson
October 30, 1995	Anaheim	United States	Arrowhead Pond	Luscious Jackson
October 31, 1995	Anaheim	United States	Arrowhead Pond	Luscious Jackson
November 1, 1995	Inglewood	United States	Great Western Forum	Luscious Jackson
November 3, 1995	San Bernardino	United States	Blockbuster Pavilion	Luscious Jackson
November 4, 1995	Phoenix	United States	Desert Sky Pavilion	Luscious Jackson
November 7, 1995	Memphis	United States	Pyramid Arena	Luscious Jackson
November 8, 1995	Knoxville	United States	Thompson–Boling Arena	Luscious Jackson
November 10, 1995	Chapel Hill	United States	Dean Smith Center	Luscious Jackson
November 11, 1995	Greensboro	United States	Greensboro Coliseum	Luscious Jackson
November 12, 1995	Charlotte	United States	Charlotte Coliseum	Luscious Jackson
November 15, 1995	Orlando	United States	Orlando Arena	Luscious Jackson
November 16, 1995	North Charleston	United States	North Charleston Coliseum	Luscious Jackson
November 18, 1995	Atlanta	United States	The Omni	Luscious Jackson
November 19, 1995	Atlanta	United States	The Omni	Luscious Jackson
November 21, 1995	Atlanta	United States	The Omni	Luscious Jackson

== 1998/1999 ==
=== Up Tour ===
Up Tour
- Tour by R.E.M.
- Associated album: Up
- Start date: October 17, 1998
- End date: September 11, 1999
- Legs: 5
- No. of shows: 60

After initially stating they would not tour behind this year's Up, the band changed their mind. A small television-and-radio tour around North America and Europe occurred between October and December. A larger, six-month tour around the same continents began in February in Europe the following year. The North American leg began in August.

"Airportman" was performed at a benefit show before the promo tour commenced in 1998, but not during any tours throughout the band's career. "You're In the Air" and "Diminished" (despite the "I'm Not Over You" coda being performed) were never performed live either.

1999 saw a performance at the Glastonbury Festival, which was later released.

Regular additional tour musicians were Joey Waronker (drums), Ken Stringfellow (keyboards) and Scott McCaughey (guitars).

Originals

Chronic Town

- "Gardening at Night"
- "Wolves, Lower"

Murmur

- "Perfect Circle"
- "Pilgrimage"
- "Radio Free Europe"
- "Sitting Still"

Reckoning

- "Camera"
- "(Don't Go Back To) Rockville"
- "So. Central Rain (I'm Sorry)"
- "Pretty Persuasion"

Fables of the Reconstruction

- "Driver 8"
- "Life and How to Live It"

Lifes Rich Pageant

- "Begin the Begin"
- "Cuyahoga"
- "Fall on Me"

Document

- "Finest Worksong"
- "It's the End of the World as We Know It (And I Feel Fine)"
- "The One I Love"
- "Strange" (Wire cover)

Green

- "Pop Song 89"
- "Stand"

Out of Time

- "Country Feedback"
- "Half a World Away"
- "Losing My Religion"

Automatic for the People

- "Everybody Hurts"
- "Find the River"
- "Man on the Moon"
- "Nightswimming"
- "Sweetness Follows"

Monster

- "Crush with Eyeliner"
- "Star 69"
- "Tongue"
- "What's the Frequency, Kenneth?"

New Adventures in Hi-Fi

- "E-Bow the Letter"
- "Electrolite"
- "How the West Was Won and Where It Got Us"
- "Leave"
- "Low Desert"
- "New Test Leper"
- "So Fast, So Numb"
- "The Wake-Up Bomb"

Up

- "The Apologist"
- "At My Most Beautiful"
- "Daysleeper"
- "Falls to Climb"
- "Hope"
- "I'm Not Over You"
- "Lotus"
- "Parakeet"
- "Sad Professor"
- "Suspicion"
- "Walk Unafraid"
- "Why Not Smile"

In Time: The Best of R.E.M. 1988–2003

- "The Great Beyond"

Other (non-album songs)

- "Live for Today"

Cover songs

- "Ambulance Blues"
- "Big Spender"
- "Black Boys on Mopeds"
- "Dallas"
- "Ghost Rider"
- "Have You Ever Seen the Rain?"
- "Jesus"
- "Long Legged Girl"
- "Long Road"
- "The Passenger"
- "People Have the Power"
- "Spooky"
- "Suspicious Minds"
- "We Don't Need Another Hero"

Date	City	Country	Venue	Opening act(s)
North America
October 17, 1998	Mountain View	United States	Shoreline Amphitheatre	
October 18, 1998	Mountain View	United States	Shoreline Amphitheatre	
October 21, 1998	New York City	United States	Bowery Ballroom	N/A
October 23, 1998	New York City	United States	Grand Ballroom at Manhattan Center	N/A
Europe
November 2, 1998	Hamburg	Germany	Gruenspan	N/A
November 6, 1998	Vienna	Austria	Orpheum	N/A
November 9, 1998	Stockholm	Sweden	Grand Hôtel	N/A
North America
February 17, 1999	Los Angeles	United States	Palace Theatre	N/A
Europe
June 17, 1999	Lisbon	Portugal	Pavilhão Atlântico	Suede
June 19, 1999	Madrid	Spain	Gutiérrez Festival	
June 20, 1999	Vigo	Spain	Recinto Ferial de Cotogrande	N/A
June 22, 1999	London	England	Earls Court Exhibition Centre	Stereolab
June 23, 1999	London	England	Earls Court Exhibition Centre	Wilco
June 25, 1999	Pilton	England	Glastonbury Festival	
June 26, 1999	Oberhausen	Germany	Arena Oberhausen	Suede Wilco
June 27, 1999	Frankfurt	Germany	Festhalle	Suede Wilco
June 29, 1999	Hanover	Germany	Sportpark am Niedersachsenstadion	Suede
June 30, 1999	Berlin	Germany	Parkbühne Wuhlheide	Suede Catatonia
July 2, 1999	Roskilde	Denmark	Roskilde Festival	
July 4, 1999	Werchter	Belgium	Rock Werchter	
July 6, 1999	Montreux	Switzerland	Montreux Jazz Festival	
July 8, 1999	Vienna	Austria	Vienna State Opera	Patti Smith
July 9, 1999	Budapest	Hungary	Kisstadion	Deus Heaven Street Seven Üllői úti Fuck
July 11, 1999	Bologna	Italy	Stadio Renato Dall'Ara	Suede Wilco Afterhours
July 13, 1999	Munich	Germany	Reitstadion Riem	Wilco Wolfsheim
July 14, 1999	Zurich	Switzerland	Hallenstadion	Wilco
July 16, 1999	Dublin	Ireland	Lansdowne Road	The Divine Comedy
July 17, 1999	Manchester	England	Manchester Evening News Arena	Teenage Fanclub
July 19, 1999	Stirling	Scotland	Stirling Castle	Feeder
July 20, 1999	Stirling	Scotland	Stirling Castle	Stereolab
July 21, 1999	Stirling	Scotland	Stirling Castle	Teenage Fanclub
July 23, 1999	Athens	Greece	Agios Kosmas	Pyx Lax
July 25, 1999	Koper	Slovenia	Dvorana Bonifika	The Bambi Molesters Vlado Kreslin
North America
August 9, 1999	Los Angeles	United States	Greek Theatre	Mercury Rev
August 10, 1999	Los Angeles	United States	Greek Theatre	Mercury Rev
August 11, 1999	Irvine	United States	Irvine Meadows Amphitheatre	Mercury Rev
August 13, 1999	Mountain View	United States	Shoreline Amphitheatre	Mercury Rev
August 15, 1999	Morrison	United States	Red Rocks Amphitheatre	Mercury Rev
August 17, 1999	Selma	United States	Retama Park	Mercury Rev
August 19, 1999	Maryland Heights	United States	Riverport Amphitheatre	Wilco
August 20, 1999	Tinley Park	United States	New World Music Theatre	Wilco
August 21, 1999	Saint Paul	United States	Midway Stadium	Wilco
August 23, 1999	Clarkston	United States	Pine Knob Music Theatre	Wilco
August 24, 1999	Toronto	Canada	Molson Amphitheatre	Wilco Ember Swift
August 25, 1999	Cuyahoga Falls	United States	Blossom Music Center	Wilco
August 27, 1999	Raleigh	United States	Alltel Pavilion at Walnut Creek	Wilco
August 29, 1999	Atlanta	United States	Chastain Park Amphitheater	Elf Power
August 30, 1999	Atlanta	United States	Chastain Park Amphitheater	Wilco
August 31, 1999	Atlanta	United States	Chastain Park Amphitheater	The Olivia Tremor Control
September 2, 1999	Seattle	United States	Bumbershoot	
September 4, 1999	Wantagh	United States	Jones Beach Amphitheater	Spacehog
September 5, 1999	Camden	United States	Blockbuster-Sony Music Entertainment Centre	Spacehog John Faye Power Trip
September 6, 1999	Holmdel	United States	PNC Bank Arts Center	Spacehog
September 8, 1999	Saratoga Springs	United States	Saratoga Performing Arts Center	Patti Smith
September 10, 1999	Columbia	United States	Merriweather Post Pavilion	Spacehog
September 11, 1999	Mansfield	United States	Tweeter Center for the Performing Arts	Spacehog

== 2001 ==
Supporting Reveal, R.E.M. undertook a small tour that took in New York City, Toronto, Japan, Australia and California.

Although "Saturn Return" was never performed live, Michael Stipe performed the song entirely himself during a show at Carnegie Hall in March 2011.

Originals

Reckoning

- "So. Central Rain (I'm Sorry)"

Lifes Rich Pageant

- "Begin the Begin"
- "Cuyahoga"
- "Fall on Me"

Dead Letter Office

- "All the Right Friends" (The IRS Years reissue)

Document

- "Finest Worksong"
- "It's the End of the World as We Know It (And I Feel Fine)"
- "The One I Love"

Green

- "Pop Song 89"
- "Stand"

Out of Time

- "Country Feedback"
- "Losing My Religion"

Automatic for the People

- "Everybody Hurts"
- "Find the River"
- "Man on the Moon"

Monster

- "Let Me In"
- "What's the Frequency, Kenneth?"

New Adventures in Hi-Fi

- "Electrolite"
- "So Fast, So Numb"
- "The Wake-Up Bomb"

Up

- "At My Most Beautiful"
- "Daysleeper"
- "Lotus"
- "Sad Professor"
- "Walk Unafraid"

Reveal

- "All the Way to Reno (You're Gonna Be a Star)"
- "Beat a Drum"
- "Chorus and the Ring"
- "Imitation of Life"
- "I'll Take the Rain"
- "I've Been High"
- "The Lifting"
- "She Just Wants to Be"

In Time: The Best of R.E.M. 1988–2003

- "The Great Beyond"

Cover songs

- "Better Man"
- "Dead from the Waist Down"
- "Have You Ever Seen the Rain?"
- "La Bamba"
- "Long Road"
- "People Have the Power"

== 2003 ==
A tour in support of the band's Warner Bros. compilation In Time took place in Europe between June and August, then in North America between August and October.

The concert video Perfect Square was taken from footage captured from a show in Wiesbaden, Germany, on this tour.

At a concert in Raleigh, North Carolina, Berry made a surprise appearance, performing backing vocals on "Radio Free Europe". He then sat behind the drum kit for a performance of the early R.E.M. song "Permanent Vacation", marking his first performance with the band since his retirement, though he still refused to rejoin the group regardless.

This was the first tour to feature Bill Rieflin, who later recorded the next three albums released from the band and performed with the group on tours supporting two of those three album releases.

Originals

Chronic Town

- "Carnival of Sorts (Box Cars)"
- "Gardening at Night"
- "Wolves, Lower"

Murmur

- "Perfect Circle"
- "Pilgrimage"
- "Radio Free Europe"
- "Sitting Still"
- "Talk About the Passion"

Reckoning

- "(Don't Go Back To) Rockville"
- "Little America"
- "So. Central Rain (I'm Sorry)"
- "Pretty Persuasion"

Fables of the Reconstruction

- "Driver 8"
- "Feeling Gravitys Pull"
- "Life and How to Live It"
- "Maps and Legends"

Lifes Rich Pageant

- "Begin the Begin"
- "Cuyahoga"
- "Fall on Me"
- "I Believe"
- "These Days"

Dead Letter Office

- "Crazy" (1992 IRS Vintage Years edition; Pylon cover)

Document

- "Disturbance at the Heron House"
- "Exhuming McCarthy"
- "Finest Worksong"
- "It's the End of the World as We Know It (And I Feel Fine)"
- "The One I Love"
- "Welcome to the Occupation"

Green

- "Get Up"
- "Orange Crush"
- "Pop Song 89"
- "Stand"
- "World Leader Pretend"
- "You Are the Everything"

Out of Time

- "Country Feedback"
- "Losing My Religion"

Automatic for the People

- "Drive"
- "Everybody Hurts"
- "Find the River"
- "Ignoreland"
- "Man on the Moon"
- "Nightswimming"
- "Sweetness Follows"

Monster

- "Star 69"
- "Strange Currencies"
- "Tongue"
- "What's the Frequency, Kenneth?"

New Adventures in Hi-Fi

- "E-Bow the Letter"
- "Electrolite"
- "Leave"
- "New Test Leper"
- "So Fast, So Numb"
- "The Wake-Up Bomb"

Up

- "At My Most Beautiful"
- "Daysleeper"
- "Lotus"
- "Walk Unafraid"

Reveal

- "All the Way to Reno (You're Gonna Be a Star)"
- "Beat a Drum"
- "Chorus and the Ring"
- "Imitation of Life"
- "I'll Take the Rain"
- "I've Been High"
- "She Just Wants to Be"

In Time: The Best of R.E.M. 1988–2003

- "Animal"
- "Bad Day"
- "The Great Beyond"

Around the Sun

- "Final Straw"

Other (non-album songs)

- "Galveston"
- "Is That All There Is?"
- "Permanent Vacation"

Cover songs

- "Dallas"
- "Favorite Writer"
- "Happy Birthday"
- "Have You Ever Seen the Rain?"
- "NYC"
- "The Passenger"
- "People Have the Power"
- "See No Evil"
- "Sweet Emotion"

== 2004/2005 ==
A promo tour for Around the Sun began in Europe in September, including opening act Now It's Overhead. Prior to the release of the album, the band partook in the political "Vote for Change" tour, which included shows in Pennsylvania, Ohio, Michigan, Florida and Washington, D.C.

After the album's release, a North American tour commenced in October 2004.

A European tour began in 2005, then extended to South Africa, Japan, Hong Kong, Australia and New Zealand. The final leg of the tour took the band back to Europe.

Around the Sun was a commercial and critical failure, and band members later expressed disappointment in the album after the tour ended. A majority of material from Around the Sun was largely absent in their subsequent tour.

Originals

Murmur

- "Perfect Circle"
- "Pilgrimage"
- "Radio Free Europe"
- Sitting Still"

Reckoning

- "(Don't Go Back To) Rockville"
- "Moon River" (1992 I.R.S. Vintage Years edition; Henry Mancini cover)
- "7 Chinese Bros."
- "So. Central Rain (I'm Sorry)"

Fables of the Reconstruction

- "Driver 8"
- "Life and How to Live It"
- "Maps and Legends"

Lifes Rich Pageant

- "Begin the Begin"
- "Cuyahoga"
- "Fall on Me"
- "These Days"
- "Superman" (The Clique cover)
- "Swan Swan H"

Document

- "Disturbance at the Heron House"
- "Exhuming McCarthy"
- "Finest Worksong"
- "It's the End of the World as We Know It (And I Feel Fine)"
- "The One I Love"
- "Welcome to the Occupation"

Green

- "Get Up"
- "Orange Crush"
- "Turn You Inside-Out"
- "World Leader Pretend"

Out of Time

- "Country Feedback"
- "Losing My Religion"
- "Me in Honey"

Automatic for the People

- "Drive"
- "Everybody Hurts"
- "Find the River"
- "Ignoreland"
- "Man on the Moon"
- "Nightswimming"
- "Sweetness Follows"

Monster

- "I Took Your Name"
- "Star 69"
- "Strange Currencies"
- "What's the Frequency, Kenneth?"

New Adventures in Hi-Fi

- "Departure"
- "E-Bow the Letter"
- "Electrolite"
- "Leave"
- "New Test Leper"
- "So Fast, So Numb"
- "Undertow"
- "The Wake-Up Bomb"

Up

- "At My Most Beautiful"
- "Daysleeper"
- "Walk Unafraid"

Reveal

- "Imitation of Life"
- "I'll Take the Rain"
- "I've Been High"
- "She Just Wants to Be"

In Time: The Best of R.E.M. 1988–2003

- "Animal"
- "Bad Day"
- "The Great Beyond"

Around the Sun

- "Aftermath"
- "Around the Sun"
- "The Ascent of Man"
- "Boy in the Well"
- "Electron Blue"
- "Final Straw"
- "High Speed Train"
- "I Wanted to Be Wrong"
- "Leaving New York"
- "Make It All Okay"
- "The Outsiders"
- "Wanderlust"
- "The Worst Joke Ever"

Accelerate

- "I'm Gonna DJ"

Other (non-album songs)

- "Permanent Vacation"

Cover songs

- "Born to Run"
- "Day Tripper"
- "Happy Birthday"
- "Have You Ever Seen the Rain?"
- "I Wanna Be Your Dog"
- "The Passenger"
- "Suzanne"
- "Teenage Kicks"

== Accelerate Tour ==
Accelerate Tour
- Tour by R.E.M.
- Location: North America, Europe, South America
- Associated album: Accelerate
- Start date: May 23, 2008
- End date: November 18, 2008
- Legs: 4
- No. of shows: 19 in North America; 48 in Europe; 10 in South America; 77 in total

R.E.M.'s final tour was the "Accelerate Tour", which took place between March and November 2008.

In 2007, before the release of Accelerate and the supporting tour behind it in 2008, R.E.M. held five night "rehearsals" in front of a live audience at Olympia Theatre, Dublin to test out new material from Accelerate and to revisit and perform old favorites, many of which hadn't been played live in nearly two decades. The resulting live album and DVD, Live at The Olympia, was released in 2009.

Accelerate was met with much critical enthusiasm, especially from fans of their back catalog who praised the "back-to-basics" direction that was undertaken with the album. Given the lukewarm reception of their previous album in comparison, the band ignored playing a majority of anything off Around the Sun.

R.E.M. disbanded in September 2011 and did not perform any shows after the conclusion of this tour. Their final Collapse into Now release was never performed live, though Michael Stipe did a solo performance of "Every Day Is Yours to Win" at Carnegie Hall in March 2011.

=== Set list ===
This set list is representative of the performance in Mexico City and does not represent all concerts for the duration of the tour.

1. "Living Well Is the Best Revenge"
2. "I Took Your Name"
3. "What's the Frequency, Kenneth?"
4. "Fall on Me"
5. "Drive"
6. "Man-Sized Wreath"
7. "Ignoreland"
8. "Disturbance at the Heron House"
9. "Hollow Man"
10. "Imitation of Life"
11. "Electrolite"
12. "The Great Beyond"
13. "Everybody Hurts"
14. "The One I Love"
15. "Find the River"
16. "Let Me In"
17. "Bad Day"
18. "Horse to Water"
19. "Orange Crush"
20. "It's the End of the World as We Know It (And I Feel Fine)"
21. "Supernatural Superserious"
22. "Losing My Religion"
23. "I Believe"
24. "Country Feedback"
25. "Life and How to Live It"
26. "Man on the Moon"
Originals

Chronic Town

- "Carnival of Sorts (Box Cars)"
- "Gardening at Night"
- "1,000,000"
- "Wolves, Lower"

Murmur

- "Perfect Circle"
- "Pilgrimage"
- "Radio Free Europe"
- "Shaking Through"
- "Sitting Still"
- "West of the Fields"

Reckoning

- "(Don't Go Back To) Rockville"
- "Harborcoat"
- "Letter Never Sent"
- "Little America"
- "Pretty Persuasion"
- "Second Guessing"
- "7 Chinese Bros."
- "So. Central Rain (I'm Sorry)"
- "Time After Time (AnnElise)"

Fables of the Reconstruction

- "Auctioneer (Another Engine)"
- "Driver 8"
- "Feeling Gravitys Pull"
- "Kohoutek"
- "Life and How to Live It"
- "Maps and Legends"

Lifes Rich Pageant

- "Begin the Begin"
- "Cuyahoga"
- "Fall on Me"
- "I Believe"
- "Just a Touch"
- "These Days"

Document

- "Disturbance at the Heron House"
- "Exhuming McCarthy"
- "Finest Worksong"
- "It's the End of the World as We Know It (And I Feel Fine)"
- "The One I Love"
- "Welcome to the Occupation"

Eponymous

- "Romance"

Green

- "Get Up"
- "Orange Crush"
- "Pop Song 89"
- "Turn You Inside-Out"
- "World Leader Pretend"

Out of Time

- "Country Feedback"
- "Losing My Religion"

Automatic for the People

- "Drive"
- "Everybody Hurts"
- "Find the River"
- "Ignoreland"
- "Man on the Moon"
- "Nightswimming"
- "Sweetness Follows"

Monster

- "Circus Envy"
- "I Took Your Name"
- "Let Me In"
- "Star 69"
- "Strange Currencies"
- "What's the Frequency, Kenneth?"

New Adventures in Hi-Fi

- "Departure"
- "Electrolite"
- "New Test Leper"
- "So Fast, So Numb"
- "The Wake-Up Bomb"

Up

- "At My Most Beautiful"
- "Walk Unafraid"

Reveal

- "Imitation of Life"
- "I've Been High"
- "She Just Wants to Be"

In Time: The Best of R.E.M. 1988–2003

- "Animal"
- "Bad Day"
- "The Great Beyond"

Around the Sun

- "Final Straw"
- "Leaving New York"
- "The Worst Joke Ever"

Accelerate

- "Airliner"
- "Accelerate"
- "Hollow Man"
- "Horse to Water"
- "Houston"
- "I'm Gonna DJ"
- "Living Well Is the Best Revenge"
- "Man-Sized Wreath"
- "Mr. Richards"
- "Sing for the Submarine"
- "Supernatural Superserious"
- "Until the Day Is Done"

Live at The Olympia

- "On the Fly"
- "Staring Down the Barrel of the Middle Distance"

Cover songs

- "Happy Birthday"
- "Have You Ever Seen the Rain?"
- "I Wanna Be Your Dog"

=== Opening acts ===
- The National and Modest Mouse (North America, excluding festivals)
- Editors (Europe, excluding festivals)
- The Duke Spirit (Prague)
- Elbow (Stuttgart – Würzburg)
- Guillemots (United Kingdom)
- The Disciplines (Oslo – Helsinki)
- We Are Scientists (Tallinn – Madrid)
- C：Real (Athens)
- Gabriella Cilmi (Athens)
- Kaiser Chiefs (Athens)
- Old 97's (Grand Prairie)
- Nenhum de Nós (Porto Alegre)
- Fernando Magalhães (Rio de Janeiro)
- Wilson Sidereal (São Paulo)
- Los Concorde (Mexico City)

=== Shows ===
Date	City	Country	Venue
North America
May 23, 2008	Burnaby	Canada	Deer Lake Park
May 24, 2008	George	United States	Sasquatch! Music Festival
May 29, 2008	Los Angeles	United States	Hollywood Bowl
May 31, 2008	Berkeley	United States	Hearst Greek Theatre
June 1, 2008	Berkeley	United States	Hearst Greek Theatre
June 3, 2008	Morrison	United States	Red Rocks Amphitheatre
June 5, 2008	Saint Paul	United States	Xcel Energy Center
June 6, 2008	Chicago	United States	United Center
June 8, 2008	Toronto	Canada	Molson Canadian Amphitheatre
June 10, 2008	Raleigh	United States	Walnut Creek Amphitheatre
June 11, 2008	Columbia	United States	Merriweather Post Pavilion
June 13, 2008	Mansfield	United States	Tweeter Center for the Performing Arts
June 14, 2008	Wantagh	United States	Nikon at Jones Beach Theater
June 18, 2008	Philadelphia	United States	Mann Center for the Performing Arts
June 19, 2008	New York City	United States	Madison Square Garden
June 21, 2008	Atlanta	United States	Lakewood Amphitheatre
Europe
July 2, 2008	Amsterdam	Netherlands	Westerpark
July 3, 2008	Werchter	Belgium	Rock Werchter
July 5, 2008	Bilbao	Spain	Bilbao BBK Live
July 6, 2008	Girona	Spain	Doctor Loft Festival
July 8, 2008	Lyon	France	Les Nuits de Fourvière
July 9, 2008	Nice	France	Théâtre de verdure de Nice
July 12, 2008	County Kildare	Ireland	Oxegen
July 13, 2008	Kinross	Scotland	T in the Park
July 15, 2008	Dresden	Germany	Filmnächte am Elbufer
July 16, 2008	Berlin	Germany	Waldbühne
July 18, 2008	Locarno	Switzerland	Moon and Stars Festival
July 20, 2008	Perugia	Italy	Umbria Jazz
July 21, 2008	Verona	Italy	Verona Arena
July 23, 2008	Naples	Italy	Neapolis Festival
July 24, 2008	Udine	Italy	Villa Manin
July 26, 2008	Milan	Italy	Milano Jazzin' Festival
July 27, 2008	Nyon	Switzerland	Paléo Festival
August 14, 2008	Salzburg	Austria	FM4 Frequency Festival
August 16, 2008	Budapest	Hungary	Sziget Festival
August 17, 2008	Prague	Czech Republic	Eden Arena
August 19, 2008	Stuttgart	Germany	Neues Schloss Ehrenhof
August 20, 2008	Sankt Goarshausen	Germany	Freilichtbühne Loreley
August 22, 2008	Würzburg	Germany	Residenzplatz Würzburg
August 24, 2008	Manchester	England	Old Trafford Cricket Ground
August 25, 2008	Cardiff	Wales	Cardiff International Arena
August 27, 2008	Southampton	England	The Rose Bowl
August 28, 2008	Paris	France	Rock en Seine
August 30, 2008	London	England	Twickenham Stadium
September 3, 2008	Oslo	Norway	Vallhall Arena
September 4, 2008	Bergen	Norway	Koengen
September 6, 2008	Copenhagen	Denmark	Parken Stadium
September 7, 2008	Stockholm	Sweden	Globe Arena
September 9, 2008	Helsinki	Finland	Finnair Stadium
September 11, 2008	Tallinn	Estonia	Saku Suurhall Arena
September 12, 2008	Riga	Latvia	Arena Riga
September 14, 2008	Vilnius	Lithuania	Siemens Arena
September 17, 2008	Oberhausen	Germany	König Pilsener Arena
September 18, 2008	Hamburg	Germany	Color Line Arena
September 20, 2008	Esch-sur-Alzette	Luxembourg	Rockhal
September 21, 2008	Geneva	Switzerland	SEG Geneva Arena
September 23, 2008	Munich	Germany	Olympiahalle
September 24, 2008	Zürich	Switzerland	Hallenstadion
September 26, 2008	Bologna	Italy	Futureshow Station
September 27, 2008	Turin	Italy	Torino Palasport Olimpico
September 30, 2008	Murcia	Spain	Plaza de Toros de Murcia
October 1, 2008	Madrid	Spain	Las Ventas
October 4, 2008	Istanbul	Turkey	S.O.S. Istanbul Festival
October 5, 2008	Athens	Greece	Panathenaic Stadium
North America
October 24, 2008	Grand Prairie	United States	Nokia Live At Grand Prairie
October 26, 2008	New Orleans	United States	Voodoo Experience
South America
October 29, 2008	Bogotá	Colombia	ColombiaFEST
November 1, 2008	Buenos Aires	Argentina	Personal Fest
November 3, 2008	Santiago	Chile	SUE Festival
November 4, 2008	Santiago	Chile	SUE Festival
November 6, 2008	Porto Alegre	Brazil	Estádio Passo d'Areia
November 8, 2008	Rio de Janeiro	Brazil	HSBC Arena
November 10, 2008	São Paulo	Brazil	Via Funchal
November 11, 2008	São Paulo	Brazil	Via Funchal
November 14, 2008	Lima	Peru	Lima HOT Festival
November 16, 2008	Caracas	Venezuela	Festival Movistar Música
North America
November 18, 2008	Mexico City	Mexico	Auditorio Nacional

== Live releases ==
Videos and DVDs

- Tourfilm (1990)
- Road Movie (1996)
- Perfect Square (2004)
- R.E.M. Live (2007)
- Live at The Olympia (This Is Not a Show) (2009)
- R.E.M. Live from Austin, Texas
- REMTV (2014)

CDs and Digital Releases

- Vancouver Rehearsal Tapes (2003)
- R.E.M. Live (2007)
- Live from London (2008)
- Live at Larry's Hide-Away (Murmur 2008 Deluxe Edition bonus disc)
- Live at the Aragon Ballroom (Reckoning 2009 Deluxe Edition bonus disc)
- Live at The Olympia (2009)
- Unplugged: The Complete 1991 and 2001 Sessions (2014)
- R.E.M. at the BBC (2018)

This list includes only official releases made up exclusively and entirely of live performances. Various other live performances by R.E.M. can be found as B-sides, compilation tracks, bonus tracks, promotional EPs, bootlegs, etc.
