= Ignoreland =

Song by R.E.M

- Promotional CD single

Promotional single by R.E.M.

from the album Automatic for the People
- Released: October 5, 1992
- Genre: Alternative rock; glam metal
- Length: 4:24
- Label: Warner Bros.
- Songwriters: Michael Stipe; Peter Buck; Mike Mills; Bill Berry
- Producers: Scott Litt; R.E.M.

"Ignoreland" is the eighth track from R.E.M.'s studio album Automatic for the People. The song was only released as a promo single, but had chart positions on the Modern Rock and Mainstream Rock charts. "Ignoreland" is the sixth song by R.E.M. to be released as a promo single while having a chart position. The previous song unreleased with a chart position by the band was a cover of Leonard Cohen's "First We Take Manhattan", which was released as a B-side to "Drive". The working title of the song was "Howler Monkey".

== Details ==
The song's lyrical content is explicitly political, referring to the conditions of the United States during the Presidencies of Jimmy Carter, Ronald Reagan, and George H. W. Bush. Stipe said that the song was " a barely adult reaction to the Iran-Contra scandal". In the song, Stipe characterizes America under Reagan and Bush as an uncaring Ignoreland.

Mike Mills said: "Michael's rolling against Republican politics. The opening line is, 'These bastards stole all the power from the victims of the us v. them years / wrecking all things virtuous and true'. And the last verse is really great – 'I know that this is vitriol, no solution, spleen-venting / But I feel better having screamed. Don't you?' It's really great."

"You need headphones to get all the words, but they're understandable," said Peter Buck. "Michael's singing through an amp on that. He wanted to get that cold anger in his voice that you get with natural distortion. And the song is written in Neil Young's tuning. Not that he owns it. But the Es are tuned down to D, like in 'Cinnamon Girl'. I admit it, he's the one I learned that tuning from."

The song made its live debut almost 16 years after its album release at the opening show for the band's final tour Accelerate in Vancouver, British Columbia, on May 23, 2008.

The song has been described by Matt Neal as "hair metal-ish".

== Charts ==
Chart (1993)	Peak position
US Alternative Airplay (Billboard)	5
US Mainstream Rock (Billboard)	4
