= The Milestone =

Music club in Charlotte, North Carolina, U.S.

- Location of the Milestone
- Location: 3400 Tuckaseegee Road; Charlotte, North Carolina, U.S.
- Coordinates: 35.24466°N 80.88347°W
- Owner: Wyley Buck Boswell
- Capacity: 170

Construction
- Opened: 1969 (57 years ago)

Website
- themilestone.club

The Milestone is a music venue in Charlotte, North Carolina. It opened in 1969. It has been owned since 2018 by Wyley Buck Boswell, who booked his first show at the club when he was 14.

Bands which have played the club include Dead Boys, the Dead Milkmen, Nirvana, the Go-Go's, the Bangles and R.E.M.

The building was formerly a home and store called Hoover's Grocery, which went out of business in the 1950s. It then became Hoover Brothers Hardware until 1962. Bill Flowers bought the building in 1969 and opened the Milestone.
