= Cuyahoga (song) =

1986 song by R.E.M.

Song by R.E.M.

from the album Lifes Rich Pageant
- Released: July 28, 1986
- Studio: Belmont Mall (Belmont, Indiana)
- Genre: Alternative rock, indie rock, jangle pop
- Length: 4:20
- Label: I.R.S. Records
- Songwriters: Bill Berry; Peter Buck; Mike Mills; Michael Stipe
- Producer: Don Gehman

"Cuyahoga" is a song by R.E.M. from their 1986 album Lifes Rich Pageant. It was written primarily by R.E.M. bassist Mike Mills and drummer Bill Berry, but credited to the whole band. It is one of R.E.M.'s earliest environmentally conscious songs, along with the album's lead single, "Fall on Me".

The themes of "Cuyahoga" include the pollution of the Cuyahoga River in Ohio and the treatment of Native Americans earlier in American history. Despite the grim themes, according to R.E.M. biographer David Buckley, the lyrics are "words of optimism, partnership and community, set against an age of individualism." R.E.M. guitarist Peter Buck said of the song that it "is a metaphor for America and its lost promises. This is where the Indians were and now look at it. It's one of the ugliest fucking rivers in the world." The song opens with the lines "Let's put our heads together and start a new country up," which R.E.M. biographer Tony Fletcher describes as sounding like a "call to arms." On the other hand, music writer Craig Rosen feels that the line adds to the song's optimism.

Another line in the song states that "we'll burn the river down." This line comes from the fact that as early as the 1910s the river was so polluted that one method of cleaning the river was to throw a torch in it and thus burn the pollutants. The river also actually caught fire on several occasions, including in 1969, an event which helped raise awareness of water pollution and other environmental issues, although it was a photograph of an even larger 1952 fire that was used in an iconic Time magazine cover on the subject. This was another inspiration for the song, and for other songs such as Randy Newman's "Burn On." Newman biographer Kevin Courrier believes that "Burn On" was an influence on "Cuyahoga."

Buckley describes the melody as "beautiful" and the refrain as "anthemic." Musically, "Cuyahoga" is propelled by Mills' bassline.

Musician Ken Stringfellow described "Cuyahoga" as being "an anthem, but it's not self-congratulatory. It's about what's gone wrong with our country. It was an anti-anthem in that way. It took on an issue, but it was still unifying and powerful. That's a hard thing to do well." Slant critic Jonathan Keefe noted that even 25 years after the song's initial release its "optimism...is still inspiring and relevant." He goes on to note that the song's message "reflects an intelligent and decidedly nonpartisan approach to political reconstruction without resorting to...didacticism." Pitchfork Media critic Stephen M. Deusner states that "With its rousing chorus and pensive bass line, 'Cuyahoga' mails postcard dispatches from a museum where rivers and plains are artifacts, consigned to diorama and memory rather than reality." According to music author Martin Charles Strong, "Cuyahoga" (and "Fall on Me") showed the band developing "an assured poise." Fletcher described "Cuyahoga" as the "lyrical peak" of Lifes Rich Pageant. It is one of Mills' favorite songs and one he particularly enjoys playing live.

Although not released as a single, "Cuyahoga" has appeared on several R.E.M. compilation albums, including The Best of R.E.M. in 1991 and And I Feel Fine... The Best of the I.R.S. Years 1982–1987 in 2006. It was also included on the live albums R.E.M. Live, Unplugged: The Complete 1991 and 2001 Sessions, Live at the Olympia and R.E.M. at the BBC.
