= Hib-Tone =

American record label

Hib-Tone Records logo

Hib-Tone is an American recording label, based in Atlanta, Georgia, founded by Jonny Hibbert, a law student at Woodrow Wilson College of Law, in 1981. The label has released eight records, including a full-length album by the band RF and the Radar Angels. The most recent release is by singer-songwriter Noёl Hamilton.

The label is notable because it released R.E.M.'s debut single "Radio Free Europe" and its B-side "Sitting Still". "Radio Free Europe" was re-recorded and released on the band's first full-length album, Murmur. "Sitting Still" was remixed by Mitch Easter and also included on Murmur. The mix produced by Hibbert and engineered by Easter of the "Hib-Tone" version of "Radio Free Europe" was subsequently released on R.E.M.'s 1988 compilation album Eponymous. The original Hibbert mixes of both songs were collected on 2006's And I Feel Fine... The Best of the I.R.S Years 1982–1987.

== Singles ==
- R.E.M. – "Radio Free Europe"/"Sitting Still" (1981)
- The Throbs – "Just One Dance"/"Girl Don't Waste Your Tears" (1981)
- Harold Kelling – "Jezebel"/"Harlem Nocturne" (1981)
- Three Hits – "Pressure Dome"/"Numbers" (1985)

== EPs ==
- The Neuz – Understand? 7" (1982)
- Design – Dancing in a Trance 12" (1984)

== Albums ==
- R.F. & The Radar Angels – Pictures of Linda (1982)

== See also ==
- List of record labels
