= Radio Free Europe (song) =

1981 single by R.E.M.

Single by R.E.M.
- B-side: "Sitting Still"
- Released: July 8, 1981
- Recorded: April 15, 1981
- Studio: Drive-In, Winston-Salem, North Carolina
- Genre: Alternative rock; punk rock; alternative pop; indie rock
- Length: 3:46
- Label: Hib-Tone
- Songwriters: Bill Berry; Peter Buck; Mike Mills; Michael Stipe
- Producer: Mitch Easter

R.E.M. singles chronology
"Radio Free Europe" (1981)	"Radio Free Europe" (1983)

"Radio Free Europe" is the debut single by American alternative rock band R.E.M., released in 1981 on the short-lived independent record label Hib-Tone. The song features "what were to become the trademark unintelligible lyrics which [sic] have distinguished R.E.M.'s work ever since." The single received critical acclaim, and its success earned the band a record deal with I.R.S. Records. R.E.M. re-recorded the song for their 1983 debut album Murmur. The re-recording for I.R.S. became the group's first charting single, peaking at number 78 on the Billboard Hot 100 chart. The song is ranked number 174 in Rolling Stone's 2024 list of the 500 Greatest Songs of All Time. In 2009, it was added to the Library of Congress's National Recording Registry for setting "the pattern for later indie rock releases by breaking through on college radio in the face of mainstream radio's general indifference."

Amid news that the Radio Free Europe/Radio Liberty organization was to have its funding cut by President Donald Trump's administration, the band released a remixed version of the song with proceeds going to RFE/RL.

== Origin and original recording ==
R.E.M. formed in Athens, Georgia, in 1980. The band quickly established itself in the local scene. Over the course of 1980, the band refined its songwriting skills, helped by its frequent gigs at local venues. One of the group's newer compositions was "Radio Free Europe". The song originated from an improvisation by Mike Mills on an unplugged electric guitar at Chapter 3 Records store, on East Broad Street in Athens. The tune was then embellished by guitarist Peter Buck. Mills explained, "I wrote the verse and B section late one night while sitting alone downstairs in an Athens record store, while a party was going on upstairs. Peter wrote the chorus and bridge, and Michael Stipe supplied the melody and lyrics." The other members of the band were reportedly awestruck when they heard the lyrics and vocals singer Stipe had come up with. By May 1981, the band added "Radio Free Europe" to its setlist. Rolling Stone describes the Hib-Tone recording as "a raw, fast version" which was re-recorded for Murmur "with a richer melody and tighter rhythm — 'like Motown,' Buck recalled." Stipe mumbled his lyrics because he hadn't finished writing them when it was time to record."

After a successful show opening for the Police, R.E.M. intended to record material for a demo tape. The group traveled to Drive-In Studio in Winston-Salem, North Carolina, to record some songs with producer Mitch Easter. Easter, a Winston-Salem native, was a member of the band Let's Active, and the studio was part of Easter's parents' home. He was recommended to R.E.M. by Peter Holsapple, Easter's bandmate in the dB's and who worked with R.E.M. in the early 1990s. After spending the night at Easter's home in downtown Winston-Salem, the band traveled to the Drive-In to record "Radio Free Europe", "Sitting Still", and the instrumental song "White Tornado", which were placed on a promotional cassette tape. "Back then, I think they had three kinds of songs," said Easter in 1998. "They had their 'classic R.E.M.' songs that were kind of pretty, like 'Gardening at Night'. Then they had their wilder, more disjointed songs. I think of that song '9-9' that ended up on Murmur. I think one of the first times they came into my studio, they tried to do that song but they didn't have it together. Then they had their funny throwaways like 'White Tornado'."

A copy of the single was received by Atlanta law student Jonny Hibbert. He offered to release "Radio Free Europe" and "Sitting Still" as a one-off 7" vinyl single with the understanding that he would own the publishing rights for both songs. The band agreed to his terms; however, Hibbert felt the recording was unsatisfactory, and oversaw a remix. "[We added] some vocal parts to 'Radio Free Europe' and 'Sitting Still'," Hibbert said in 1998. "I wanted R.E.M. to sound the way they sounded when I first heard them in Tyrone's." Easter said he found the presence of Hibbert "distracting" and added, "He came into my studio and it was like, now the big city guy is going to do it right. We mixed the song for about 12 hours and really, there wasn't enough equipment to warrant more than 45 minutes." The final mastering of the song disappointed the band. Peter Buck, who described the recording years later as "muddy and hi-end", expressed his displeasure by breaking a copy of the finished single and nailing it to his wall. Buck later admitted that "there's something to be said for the original sort of murky feeling for [the original recording]".

Easter later mixed another version of the song, titled "radio dub". "I didn't think [Hibbert's mix] was so hot, so I did one more," confirmed Easter. "He thought it was an improvement on the first mix," said Hibbert. "Peter was the most vocal about wanting to use Mitch's new mix, but I put my foot down and we released the mix I preferred. I was probably the last person ever to override Peter Buck".

=== Cover art ===
The cover art to the single was designed by Michael Stipe. "Michael brought those negatives over to our place," explains photographer Terry Allen. "He said, 'Can you make a print of these?' and we said, 'What, you want a picture of this blur?' He said, 'Yeah,' and so I said, 'I've got a picture that's probably better than this that you can use,' but he said, 'No, I want this blur!'"

Around 600 copies of the first pressing were sent out for promotional uses. Around 400 other copies were pressed. "[These] went to Wuxtry and some went to New York," said record collector Todd Ploharski. The original pressing omitted the Hib-Tone contact address; it was included, however, on the 6,000 copies of the second pressing.

== Composition ==
"Radio Free Europe"
Sample of "Radio Free Europe", as recorded for R.E.M.'s debut album Murmur (1983). Re-recorded after its initial release as a single on Hib-Tone in 1981, the sample illustrates the change from the verse to the pre-chorus. Guitarist Peter Buck and bassist Mike Mills play steady eight-note figures during the verse. During the bridge, Buck switches to playing arpeggios.

Both the Hib-Tone and I.R.S. releases of "Radio Free Europe" begin with brief instrumental intros before the band enters. The Hib-Tone version features a brief synthesizer figure. The intro to the I.R.S. version originated as an errant system hum accidentally recorded on tape. Easter triggered the effect to open and shut an electronic noise gate in time with bassist Mike Mills' playing. The producer then manually adjusted the equalizer of the effect on the studio mixing console, and spliced the seven-bar figure into the start of the recording.

Drummer Bill Berry begins the song with a four-to-the-floor beat, and then the rest of the band enters. Berry plays a steady backbeat throughout the song. During the verses, Mills plays a fast eighth note bassline pulse, characteristic of punk rock and new wave. Guitarist Peter Buck plays the palm-muted lower strings of his guitar, marking the end of a four-bar repetition with an upstroke strummed chord. During the pre-chorus refrain, Buck switches to playing arpeggios, ending each four bar phrase with a full chord downstroke. Mills accompanies this section by performing independent melody lines with syncopated rhythms. Mills' last note of the refrain is doubled by a piano.

After two verses and two pre-choruses, the band enters the song's chorus, where Stipe sings the phrase "Calling out in transit/Calling out in transit/Radio Free Europe". After a second chorus, a bridge section follows, where Mills' one-note ascending bassline is doubled by the piano. The band then plays a final verse-prechorus-chorus section. At the song's end, Buck plays an arpeggio figure similar to the pre-chorus refrain, and the band ends on an A chord.

== Lyrics ==
Stipe's lyrics are known for being obscure and difficult to discern, largely serving to give the singer something to vocalize with. When first developing the original song, Stipe intentionally did not want the lyrics to be understood, as he "...hadn't written any of the words yet." Also, when the song was played live, Stipe improvised his own set of lyrics halfway through the song. In a 1988 NME interview, Stipe denied the interviewer's claim that his lyrics on Murmur were "indecipherable", but acknowledged that "Radio Free Europe" was one of the few exceptions, describing it as "complete babbling". While the lyrics to the song have never been published by the band, lyrics to "Radio Free Europe" were published in Song Hits magazine in 1983, and in New Sounds magazine in January 1984. Despite the song being named after the United States government broadcaster Radio Free Europe/Radio Liberty, Mike Mills claimed in the liner notes to the two-CD edition of And I Feel Fine... The Best of the I.R.S. Years 1982–1987 that the song's content was unrelated to the network and that the name was picked purely because it sounded appealing.

In 2024, Mills mentioned Stipe's "straight off the boat" note, stating: "That's jazz. Where the hell did he get that from? It's not in the chord, and it's a really tough note to sing, but he hits it. He was astonishing me, even then."

The San Francisco-based band Game Theory, whose albums were also produced by Mitch Easter, began to cover the song in their shows in 1985, with lyrics sung clearly by Scott Miller. According to drummer Gil Ray, "Either Buck or Stipe told Scott Miller in our band the real words to 'Radio Free Europe' and every now and then we'd do it as a cover because Scott knew the words. It was a big deal to know the words to any of their songs." Miller's first live performance of the song, in September 1985, appears as a bonus track on the 2014 CD reissue of Game Theory's Dead Center.

== Re-recording and I.R.S. single release ==
"Radio Free Europe"
- American sleeve for the I.R.S. release

Single by R.E.M.

from the album Murmur
- B-side: "There She Goes Again"
- Released: July 8, 1983
- Recorded: January 6 – February 23, 1983
- Studio: Reflection, Charlotte, North Carolina
- Genre: Alternative rock; indie rock
- Length: 4:06
- Label: I.R.S.
- Songwriters: Bill Berry; Peter Buck; Mike Mills; Michael Stipe
- Producers: Don Dixon; Mitch Easter

R.E.M. singles chronology
"Radio Free Europe (Hib-Tone version)" (1981)	"Radio Free Europe" (1983)	"Talk About the Passion" (1983)

Music video
- "Radio Free Europe" on YouTube

Dutch release

R.E.M. signed to I.R.S. Records in 1982. I.R.S. asked the band to re-record "Radio Free Europe" in 1983 for their debut album, Murmur. The band agreed, because they had felt that they had improved significantly since the original 1981 sessions.

The 1983 version has some slightly different lyrics and a slower tempo, and is not as well-liked by the band as the original; indeed, the liner notes for the 1988 compilation album Eponymous (on which the original Hib-Tone version is featured) stated that "Mike and Jefferson think this one [referring to the Hib-Tone version] crushes the other one like a grape." Peter Buck has also stated that he "[didn't] think we captured it the way we did on the single." Original producer Mitch Easter also commented on the re-recording, saying it was "more pro, but a little too sedate."

Unknown to the band, I.R.S. president Jay Boberg had the album's co-producer Don Dixon add some 1980s-style snare sound to the track. Mike Mills: "Peter and I said, 'This is fucking awful.' So, we called Don and said, 'Don, what the hell is this?' He said, 'Well, I kind of got squeezed by the record company.' I said, 'Well, we're coming back for the remix.' We went back up [to Reflection] and remixed two or three songs. Even now, when I listen to 'Radio Free Europe' off Murmur, I still hear that gated snare that drives me crazy. We got rid of most of it, but it's still there."

The re-recorded version of "Radio Free Europe" was the first single from Murmur. It was the first R.E.M. single to reach the charts, peaking at number 78 on the Billboard singles chart and remaining on the chart for five weeks. The song also reached number 25 on the Billboard Hot Mainstream Rock Tracks chart.

Cash Box reviewed the single and commented on "its toughened-up Byrds jangly guitar and vocal style." Record World said it has "a touch of anarchy and enough unrestrained energy to charge a dance hall for an entire evening" and that "What [R.E.M.] lack in finesse is compensated for with driving rock spirit". A live performance at Larry's Hideaway, Toronto, Canada, from July 9, 1983, was released on the 2008 deluxe edition reissue of Murmur.

=== Music video ===
At the request of MTV, the 1983 single was accompanied by a music video, directed by Arthur Pierson. The video took place in the garden of artist Howard Finster, who went on to paint the album cover for the band's second album, Reckoning.

=== Charts ===
Chart (1983)	Peak position
US Billboard Hot 100	78
US Mainstream Rock (Billboard)	25

Chart (2021)	Peak position

Chart (2025)	Peak position
UK Singles Downloads (Official Charts)	67

== Track listings ==
All songs written by Bill Berry, Peter Buck, Mike Mills, and Michael Stipe unless otherwise indicated.

Hib-Tone version

1. "Radio Free Europe" – 3:46
2. "Sitting Still" – 3:07

I.R.S. version

1. "Radio Free Europe" (edit) – 3:10
2. "There She Goes Again" (Lou Reed) – 2:49

== Personnel ==
Credits taken from Sound on Sound, except where noted.

=== Hib-Tone version ===
R.E.M.

- Bill Berry – drums, triangle, tambourine
- Peter Buck – guitar
- Mike Mills – bass guitar
- Michael Stipe – vocals

Additional personnel

- Mitch Easter – production

=== I.R.S. version ===
R.E.M.

- Bill Berry – drums, triangle
- Peter Buck – guitar
- Mike Mills – bass guitar, piano
- Michael Stipe – vocals

Additional personnel

- Don Dixon – production
- Mitch Easter – production, additional snare drum
