= J.B. Scott's =

Coordinates: 42.665°N 73.773°W

J.B. Scott's was a nightclub and music venue located on Central Avenue in Albany, New York. Its capacity was approximately 600. J.B. Scott's opened in 1979 and closed in 1982 after it was damaged by a fire. One year later the kids who set the fire were caught. Although only around for a relatively short period, J.B. Scott's played an import role in the Capital District's music scene. Some of its performers included U2, John Mellencamp, Stevie Ray Vaughan, Bryan Adams, Judas Priest, Thin Lizzy, Pat Benatar, Meat Loaf and Iggy Pop the Go-Go's, Count Basie and Buddy Rich. In 1985 club owners Douglas Jacobs and Vinnie Birbiglia opened another nightclub in Albany named JB's Theatre.
