= Talk About the Passion =

Song by R.E.M

Single by R.E.M.

from the album Murmur
- Released: November 14, 1983
- Recorded: 1983
- Studio: Reflection (Charlotte)
- Genre: Folk rock; jangle pop
- Length: 3:23
- Label: I.R.S
- Songwriters: Bill Berry; Peter Buck; Mike Mills; Michael Stipe
- Producers: Don Dixon; Mitch Easter

R.E.M. singles chronology
"Radio Free Europe" (1983)	"Talk About the Passion" (1983)	"So. Central Rain (I'm Sorry)" (1984)

"Talk About the Passion" is a song by the American alternative rock band R.E.M., released as the second single released from its debut album Murmur in 1983. It was released in Europe only, on 12" vinyl. This song failed to follow up on the success of "Radio Free Europe" released earlier in the year, as it did not chart. A live performance at Larry's Hideaway, Toronto, Canada, from July 9, 1983, was released on the 2008 Deluxe Edition reissue of Murmur.

Michael Stipe has stated that "Talk About the Passion" is a song about hunger, but the lyrics were not clear enough, with the only direct reference in the song being to "empty mouths". The video, made in 1988 and featured on the compilations Pop Screen and When the Light Is Mine, made this meaning of the song more explicit by showing images of homeless people and images of an aircraft carrier, ending with the caption, "in 1987 the cost of one destroyer-class warship was 910 million dollars."

An uncredited female cellist plays on the song. "This woman from Charlotte who played in the Symphony down there who somebody at the studio knew," said the album's co-producer Mitch Easter.

In the liner notes to the compilation album Part Lies, Part Heart, Part Truth, Part Garbage 1982-2011, Mike Mills wrote that the guitar solo to this song was played by himself, guitarist Peter Buck and producers Easter and Don Dixon on multiple acoustic guitars.

Buck said: "We'd never played it all the way through before. It was just a rehearsal take, and Mitch Easter said, 'That's fine.'"

The song was included on R.E.M.'s first I.R.S. Records greatest-hits album, Eponymous, and released as the only single from that album in 1988.

== Track listing ==
All songs written by Bill Berry, Peter Buck, Mike Mills and Michael Stipe unless otherwise indicated.

1. "Talk About the Passion" – 3:24
2. "Shaking Through" – 4:30
3. "Carnival of Sorts (Boxcars)" – 3:55
4. "1,000,000" – 3:07
