= 7 Chinese Bros. =

Song by R.E.M

Song by R.E.M.

from the album Reckoning
- Released: April 9, 1984
- Studio: Reflection Sound (Charlotte, North Carolina)
- Genre: Alternative rock
- Length: 4:18
- Label: I.R.S.
- Songwriters: Bill Berry; Peter Buck; Mike Mills; Michael Stipe
- Producers: Mitch Easter; Don Dixon

"7 Chinese Bros." is a song by R.E.M. that was first released on their 1984 album Reckoning.

== Lyrics and music ==
The lyrics to "7 Chinese Bros.", as with many R.E.M. songs of this period, are somewhat mysterious. The title and some of the lyrics were influenced by the 1938 children's book The Five Chinese Brothers by Claire Huchet Bishop. In the book, the five brothers each have a special power, and the brother capable of swallowing the ocean agrees to do so in order that a young boy can collect fish from the dry seabed. This seems to be the basis for the lyrics in the refrain about "Seven Chinese brothers swallowing the ocean," even though in the book only one of the brothers swallows the ocean. Another line in the refrain, "She will return," has been interpreted to be a reference to Carol Levy, a friend of the band who had died in a car accident. Lead singer Michael Stipe has stated that the song was about him once "breaking up a couple, and then dating both of them, a man and a woman, which is a terrible thing to do, but I was young and stupid." This incident may be the inspiration for another line in the refrain "Seven thousand years to sleep away the pain."

Allmusic critic Denise Sullivan describes Bill Berry's drumming as giving the song "a danceability unfound in most R.E.M. tracks." However, Stipe felt that the drumming was too loud in the mix on Reckoning. Sullivan states that Peter Buck's guitar "creeps along in melodic jangle tones throughout." Rolling Stone critic Christopher Connelly states that "Buck does it all: curt, distorted background chords, icy piano notes, warm chordal plucking and high-string riffs that drone." Co-producer Mitch Easter has stated that "7 Chinese Bros." was "another classic modal-sounding R.E.M. song where the guitar had this familiar and yet slightly odd quality about it. It had that sort of simple but real memorable guitar line that they were real good at." According to Northwest Herald critic Bryan Wawzenek, Mike Mills' "melodic bass" dovetails with Buck's guitar lines.

== Writing and recording ==
According to Stipe, "7 Chinese Bros." was written in North Carolina.

Stipe had difficulty recording "7 Chinese Bros." and in particular his first attempts at recording the vocal were too soft. In an effort to get Stipe into a better mood to record, co-producer Don Dixon threw him the Revelaires gospel album The Joy of Knowing Jesus. Stipe sang the liner notes to that album to the music of "7 Chinese Bros.", which inspired him to record a usable vocal performance of the lyrics to "7 Chinese Bros." The recording of the liner notes to The Joy of Knowing Jesus was issued as a b-side to the 12" single of "So. Central Rain (I'm Sorry)" under the title "Voice of Harold". The "Voice of Harold" track was also included on the compilation Dead Letter Office.

== Personnel ==
Sources:

- Bill Berry – drums
- Peter Buck – guitar
- Mike Mills – bass, backing vocals, piano
- Michael Stipe – lead vocals

== Reception ==
Allmusic critic Stephen Thomas Erlewine called "7 Chinese Bros." a "classic," praising its "pulsating riffs." Connelly states that "the song flows with elegiac grace."

== Cover versions ==
Chris and Rich Robinson of The Black Crowes covered "7 Chinese Bros." in an acoustic show in Portland 2020, with Peter Buck joining them as a guest guitarist.
