= Sitting Still =

R.E.M. song

Single by R.E.M.
- A-side: "Radio Free Europe"
- Released: July 8, 1981
- Recorded: April–May 1981
- Studio: Drive-In Studios in Winston-Salem, North Carolina, United States
- Genre: Folk rock; punk rock
- Length: 3:07
- Label: Hib-Tone
- Songwriters: Bill Berry; Peter Buck; Mike Mills; Michael Stipe
- Producer: Mitch Easter

"Sitting Still"

Song by R.E.M.

from the album Murmur
- Released: April 12, 1983
- Recorded: 1983
- Genre: Alternative rock; folk rock; punk rock
- Length: 3:17
- Label: I.R.S.
- Songwriters: Bill Berry; Peter Buck; Mike Mills; Michael Stipe
- Producers: Don Dixon; Mitch Easter

"Sitting Still" is a song by the American rock band R.E.M. It was originally released as the B-side to the band's debut single "Radio Free Europe" on July 8, 1981. It later appeared as the eighth track on the band's 1983 debut album Murmur.

== Writing and recording ==
"Sitting Still" was one of the first songs written by R.E.M., in late 1980, along with "Radio Free Europe" and "Shaking Through." Hib-Tone founder Jonny Hibbert agreed to release "Radio Free Europe" and "Sitting Still" as a single on his label in exchange for the publishing rights. The song was initially recorded on April 15, 1981, and some of Michael Stipe's vocals were re-recorded in May. The single was released on July 8, 1981. The band was able to reacquire the publishing rights in order to issue the two songs on Murmur in 1983. Unlike "Radio Free Europe," which was re-recorded, the version of "Sitting Still" on Murmur is from the same recording made at producer Mitch Easter's Drive-In Studio as the Hib-Tone single. However, some changes were made to the Murmur version, such as slowing down the tape. Also, some out of tune backing vocals were fixed and Mike Mills re-recorded his bass part.

== Music and lyrics ==
"Sitting Still" reflects R.E.M.'s folk rock influences. Peter Buck's guitar riffs have been compared to those of The Byrds. The song's verses have a call and response structure, with Buck's guitar arpeggios responding to Stipe's vocal line. Allmusic critic Stewart Mason states that this is one of the few R.E.M. songs in which Mills and drummer Bill Berry act as a traditional rhythm section, propelling the song forward together. Mills plays straightforward punk rock-influenced eighth notes, and does not incorporate his typical walking bass lines or "harmonic accents." It is one of the band's most straightforward rock songs. Mason calls it "part of the band's statement of purpose" as it gives the message "See, we can play regular pop songs, we just choose not to."

As with "Radio Free Europe," the lyrics to "Sitting Still" are notoriously murky. Stipe has acknowledged that the first line of the refrain, "Up to par and Katie bar the kitchen door but not me in," does not mean anything. In a 1991 interview he did provide some insight into a potential meaning, stating that "Katie bar the door" is a Southern expression for barring the door to prevent a child from escaping punishment and is used as a warning that the child better watch out. Another line, "We can gather, throw a fit" has often been misinterpreted as "We can gather, throw up beer." He has also acknowledged that much of the song is made of nonsensical vowels strung together and that he merely approximates the words when he sings the song in concert. To the extent the song contains decipherable lyrics, they seem to be inspired at least in part by Stipe's sister, who is deaf and teaches deaf children. Marcus Gray interprets the song as being directed at a child, possibly a deaf child, based on its title referencing a common exhortation restricting children and other hints in the lyrics.

A line in the refrain announces that "I can hear you." Music writer J. Niimi states that this line "binds the obtuseness of the lyrics" and performs a similar "cathartic" function as the audible line "Call out in transit" performs for the murky lyrics of "Radio Free Europe." However, the last line of the song "Can you hear me?" turns this phrase around. This brings the song back to the theme of deafness. Music writer Craig Rosen also interprets this line as a challenge from Stipe to listeners to try to understand his vocals. Niimi interprets it as an expression of the band's fear that, despite their own confidence in their murky style, listeners won't be able to accept them.

== Personnel ==
Personnel adapted from Radio Free Europe single liner notes.

- Bill Berry – drums
- Peter Buck – guitar
- Mike Mills – bass guitar
- Michael Stipe – vocals

== Other appearances ==
The re-recorded version of "Sitting Still" was included on the 2006 compilation album And I Feel Fine... The Best of the I.R.S. Years 1982–1987, with the original being on the album's bonus disc. A live version was included on the 2009 live album Live at the Olympia.
