= Pop Screen =

Video by R.E.M.
- Released: July 1, 1990
- Genre: Alternative rock
- Label: Warner Bros.

R.E.M. chronology
Green (1988)	Pop Screen (1990)	Tourfilm (1990)

R.E.M. video chronology
Succumbs (1987)	Pop Screen (1990)	Tourfilm (1990)

Pop Screen is a video feature compiling all of R.E.M.'s Document and Green-era promotional videos. It was released on VHS on July 1, 1990, and on DVD format (region 1 only) on August 22, 2000, both on the Warner Bros. label.

The 35-minute release features promotional videos to all of the band's singles and several album-only tracks from Document and Green. It also includes the video for "Talk About the Passion" from Murmur. This particular video was made to promote the compilation Eponymous, which was released between Document and Green, and this is the reason for its otherwise anachronistic inclusion.

It includes the uncensored version of "Pop Song 89", which has three topless women dancing along with a topless Michael Stipe. In preparation for television airings, MTV asked Stipe, who directed it himself, to censor the three topless women. Instead, Stipe superimposed black bars on the chests of all four dancers, himself included, and stated, "a nipple is a nipple".

There are no bonus features on the DVD. Audio on the DVD-5 is PCM Stereo.

== Track listing ==
All tracks written by Bill Berry, Peter Buck, Mike Mills and Michael Stipe.

1. "The One I Love"
2. "It's the End of the World as We Know It (And I Feel Fine)"
3. "Finest Worksong"
4. "Talk About the Passion"
5. "Orange Crush"
6. "Stand"
7. "Turn You Inside-Out"
8. "Pop Song 89"
9. "Get Up"
10. Credits
