= Tourfilm =

Video by R.E.M.
- Released: September 25, 1990
- Recorded: November 1989
- Venue: Greensboro Coliseum, Greensboro, North Carolina, United States
- Genre: Alternative rock
- Length: 83:55
- Label: Warner Reprise Video
- Director: Jim McKay
- Producer: Michael Stipe, Jim McKay

R.E.M. albums chronology
| Pop Screen (1990) | Tourfilm (1990) | Out of Time (1991) |

R.E.M. video chronology
| Succumbs (1987) | Tourfilm (1990) | This Film Is On (1991) |

R.E.M. live albums chronology
| Tourfilm (1990) | Road Movie (1996) |

Tourfilm (1990) is a documentary-style concert film by American rock band R.E.M. The film chronicles the band's 1989 Green tour of North America. Produced by frontman Michael Stipe and director Jim McKay, the black-and-white film features aspects of avant-garde and experimental filmmaking, including handheld camera shots and stock footage.

Unlike most films of its genre, Tourfilm is noticeably devoid of standard rock movie staples such as backstage footage and interviews with band members. The film was released on LaserDisc and VHS in 1990 and DVD in August 2000.

All the audio for Tourfilm comes from the R.E.M.'s show at Greensboro Coliseum on November 10, 1989, though it also includes brief video footage from four other tour stops:

- November 7, 1989 – Roanoke Civic Center, Roanoke, Virginia
- November 8, 1989 – Hampton Coliseum, Hampton, Virginia
- November 11, 1989 – Macon Coliseum, Macon, Georgia
- November 13, 1989 – Fox Theatre, Atlanta, Georgia

== Track listing ==
All tracks written by Bill Berry, Peter Buck, Mike Mills and Michael Stipe except as indicated.

1. Intro – 0:28
2. "Stand" – 3:11
3. "The One I Love" – 4:50
4. "These Days" – 3:40 includes excerpt from "So. Central Rain (I'm Sorry)"
5. "Turn You Inside-Out" – 4:15
6. "World Leader Pretend" – 5:24 includes excerpt from "We Live As We Dream, Alone" (Andy Gill, Jon King) by Gang of Four
7. "Feeling Gravitys Pull" – 6:34
8. "I Believe" – 5:05 includes excerpt from "Future 40's (String of Pearls)" (Syd Straw, Stipe, Jody Harris) by Syd Straw
9. "I Remember California" – 5:50
10. "Get Up" – 3:00
11. "It's the End of the World as We Know It (And I Feel Fine)" – 4:51
12. "Pop Song 89" – 5:10 includes an excerpt from "Belong"
13. "Fall on Me" – 3:19
14. "You Are the Everything" – 4:50
15. "Begin the Begin" – 3:47
16. "King of Birds" – 7:06 includes excerpts from "With the People" by Drivin' N Cryin' and from "Low"
17. "Finest Worksong" – 4:06
18. "Perfect Circle" – 3:59
19. "After Hours" (Lou Reed) (credits) – 4:22

== Certifications ==
| Region | Certification | Certified units/sales |
|---|---|---|
| Australia (ARIA) | Gold | 7,500^{^} |
| United States (RIAA) | Gold | 50,000^{^} |
^{^} Shipments figures based on certification alone.
