= Turn You Inside-Out =

1988 song by R.E.M.

- Spain promotional release

Promotional single by R.E.M.

from the album Green
- Released: 1988
- Recorded: 1988
- Genre: Alternative rock; hard rock; funk metal
- Length: 4:16
- Label: Warner Bros.
- Songwriters: Michael Stipe; Peter Buck; Mike Mills; Bill Berry
- Producers: Scott Litt; R.E.M.

"Turn You Inside-Out" is a song by American rock band R.E.M. from their sixth studio album Green. Like all tracks on the album, it was written by group members Michael Stipe, Peter Buck, Mike Mills, and Bill Berry. The song's main guitar riff is an inversion of that used in "Finest Worksong". The recording also features percussion from former Sugar Hill Records house drummer Keith LeBlanc.

Despite only being released as a single promotionally, it did well on the Billboard Alternative Songs and Mainstream Rock Tracks charts, placing top ten positions on both charts. A music video for the track was directed by James Herbert, who had previously directed music videos for eight other R.E.M. tracks. The video saw frequent rotation on shows such as MTV's 120 Minutes.

In a 1989 live performance of the song, Stipe proclaimed to the audience, "This song goes out to the Exxon Corporation". This performance happened shortly after the Exxon Valdez oil spill, in which the oil tanker Exxon Valdez struck the Bligh Reef and spilled 260,000 to 750,000 barrels of crude oil. This may further elaborate on the environmental message of the album Green.

In a review for R.E.M.'s 2011 album Collapse Into Now, British magazine Uncut writes that the opening track, "Discoverer", "summons memories of the baleful stadium rock of Green, [Peter] Buck recycling the purposeful shuddering guitar of 'Turn You Inside-Out'."

The song is featured on the soundtrack to the 2008 video game Grand Theft Auto IV, and is featured in-game on the radio station "Liberty Rock Radio 97.8".

== Track listing ==
Spain 7" single

A. "Turn You Inside-Out"
B. "Turn You Inside-Out"

US CD single

1. "Turn You Inside-Out" (LP version) – 4:15

== Charts ==
| Chart (1989) | Peak position |
|---|---|
| US Alternative Airplay (Billboard) | 10 |
| US Mainstream Rock (Billboard) | 7 |

== Personnel ==
- Bill Berry – drums
- Peter Buck – guitar
- Mike Mills – bass guitar, keyboards, backing vocals
- Michael Stipe – lead vocals
- Keith LeBlanc – percussion
