= Get Up (R.E.M. song) =

Song by R.E.M.

Single by R.E.M.

from the album Green
- B-side: "Funtime"
- Released: 5 September 1989
- Recorded: 1988
- Genre: Bubblegum pop
- Length: 2:42
- Label: Warner Bros.
- Songwriters: Bill Berry; Peter Buck; Mike Mills; Michael Stipe
- Producers: Scott Litt; R.E.M.

R.E.M. singles chronology
| "Pop Song 89" (1989) | "Get Up" (1989) | "Losing My Religion" (1991) |

"Get Up" is the fourth and final single released by R.E.M. from the band's sixth album, Green (1988). It was included in the limited-edition Singleactiongreen box set released in November 1989. The song was released as a single only in the U.S. but failed to chart on the Billboard Hot 100.

The song was written by vocalist Michael Stipe about Mike Mills, the band's bass player. Mills always seemed to sleep late during their recording sessions for Green. This was Stipe's call for Mills to get up and work. However, Mills did not find this out until a concert in the late 1990s, when Stipe introduced the song as being about him.

The video for the song was created by a young filmmaker named Eric Darnell, who had recently graduated from the CalArts program in experimental animation and who went on to co-direct the mainstream computer-animated features Antz and Madagascar.

In the film Tourfilm, which features footage from R.E.M.'s tour in 1989, Stipe introduces this song as his favorite.

During the bridge, several music boxes are played at once. This was the idea of drummer Bill Berry, who had originally envisioned this in a dream.

== Track listing ==
1. "Get Up" (Bill Berry, Peter Buck, Mike Mills, Michael Stipe) – 2:35
2. "Funtime" (David Bowie, Iggy Pop) – 2:14

== Personnel ==
- Bill Berry – drums, vocals
- Peter Buck – guitar
- Mike Mills – bass, vocals
- Michael Stipe – vocals
