= Bertis Downs IV =

Lawyer and manager of rock band R.E.M.

Bertis Downs
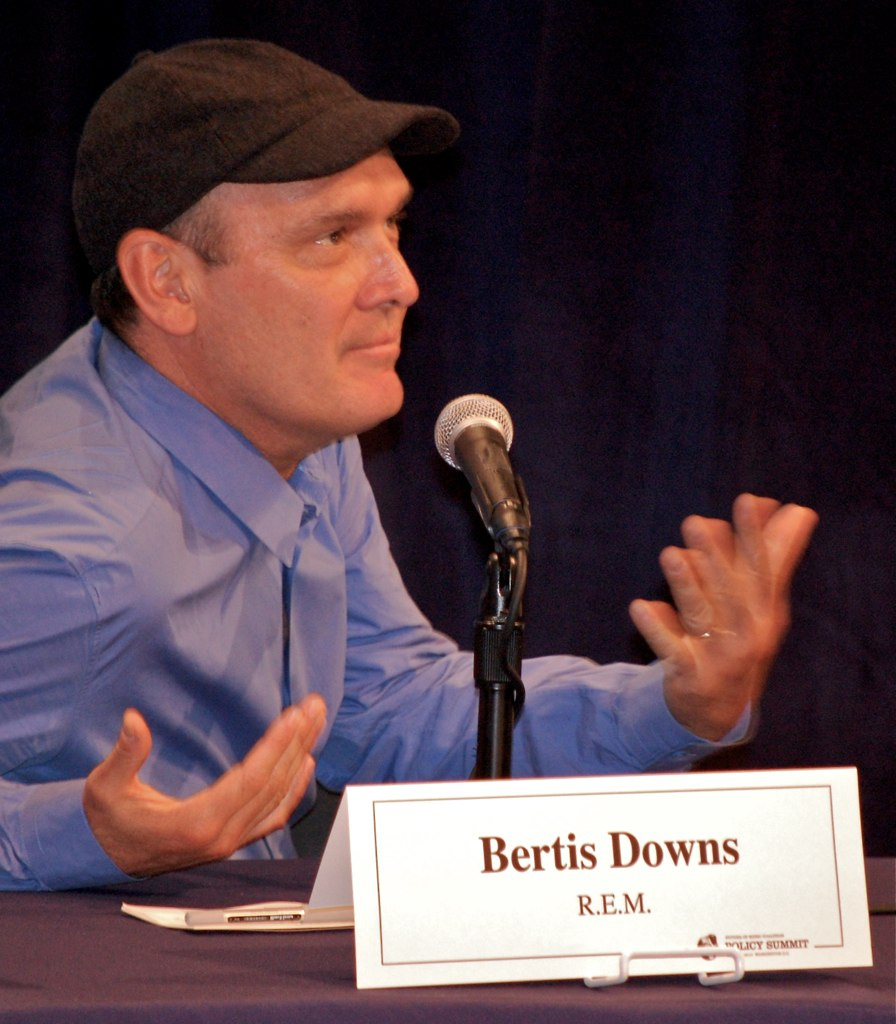
- Downs in 2010
- Born: Bertis Edwin Downs IV; July 13, 1956 (age 70)
- Education: Davidson College (BA), University of Georgia (JD)
- Occupations: Lawyer, manager for rock band R.E.M.
- Years active: 1981–present
- Website: https://bertisdowns.com

Bertis Edwin Downs IV (born July 13, 1956) is an American entertainment lawyer. He provides legal counsel (particularly for initial contracts) for the rock band R.E.M., later also assuming management duties after the departure of original manager Jefferson Holt. He is usually credited simply as the band's "Advisor".

== Early life ==
Downs was born in Montgomery, West Virginia, a short distance from Smithers, West Virginia, where his father, Bertis Edwin Downs, III, was a Presbyterian minister. His mother, Ann Elizabeth (Bryan) Downs, was also an active member of the Presbyterian Church and travelled with her husband and their sons to Taiwan as part of the Church's evangelical mission in Taipei. Bertis Downs III died in a commercial plane crash on June 20, 1964.

Ann Downs moved her three sons Bertis IV, William, and Bryan to Richmond, Virginia, then back to Taiwan, before finally settling in Clarkston, Georgia in order to be closer to the boys' grandparents in western Virginia and eastern Mississippi.

Downs graduated from Dekalb County's Shamrock High School in 1974 and chose to attend his father's alma mater Davidson College in North Carolina. There he became interested in music through his DJ shifts at WDAV-FM and his work with the college union's concert committee. He also became interested in a career in law through working in a minimum-security prison in rural North Carolina and a summer internship working to establish a recreation program for inmates in Atlanta's Fulton County Jail. Downs graduated cum laude from Davidson College in 1978 with a Bachelor of Arts degree in history.

Downs attended the University of Georgia School of Law with the intent of a career as a public interest attorney due to his interests in civil rights and legal aid work. Due to hiring freezes in the field after his graduation in 1981, Downs instead took a job teaching Legal Research and Writing at the law school. It is during this time as a teacher that Downs became active in the Athens music scene, leading to his eventual involvement with R.E.M.

In 1983, Downs left Athens to clerk for Senior Judge Wilson Cowan of the newly formed Court of Appeals for the Federal Circuit in Washington, D.C. While in D.C. he met his future wife Katherine at a Love Tractor show at the 9:30 Club.

== Career with R.E.M. ==
In 1978, John Huie, a representative for the booking company R.E.M.'s drummer Bill Berry worked for at the time, suggested Berry look up Downs, whom he knew from Davidson College and was then in law school at the University of Georgia. Berry and Downs also served together on the University Union Concert Committee that arranged for visiting musicians to perform on campus.

Downs attended an R.E.M. show at the 11.11 Koffee Club in Athens, Georgia on April 19, 1980. By that time, Downs had also come to know Peter Buck from Wuxtry Records, a downtown Athens shop where he would buy Neil Young records. Recalling events nineteen years later on VH1's Behind the Music, Downs said, "I thought they were great". He and the band immediately forged a friendship. "They started asking me questions about copyright issues, trademark issues, the first time they had a recording agreement they needed me to have a look at", Downs said. "They knew that I was just out of law school and was just getting started as a lawyer, and I certainly didn't claim any particular expertise. I learned by the seat of my pants. I worked with them as a volunteer, just helping out, and gradually over the next couple of years it became more like a real job, and, all these years later, that's kind of still what it is."

Downs primarily remained working in Athens during the early years of the band, teaching at the law school and managing the ins and outs of “moving a small city around,” but began traveling with the group more often during the 1995 “Monster” tour. After Jefferson Holt's departure in 1996, Downs took over as the band's manager. “I'm the guy who helps them run the business,” said Downs. “They are the board of directors. I am the CEO.”

Downs continued in his advisor role for R.E.M. even after the members parted ways in 2011, describing the experience as “orchestrating the afterlife” of the band. In an interview with the Athens, GA alternative magazine Flagpole in 2014, Downs described his current workload as such: “The volume isn't as much. We're not making records anymore. We're not going on tour anymore. There are still some side things going on…We're still busy, but not with the same intensity.”

== Education and academic career ==
Downs graduated cum laude from Davidson College in 1978 with a Bachelor of Arts degree in history. In 1981, he graduated from the University of Georgia School of Law. He was a law clerk for Senior Judge Wilson Cowen of the United States Court of Appeals for the Federal Circuit. He was an adjunct professor in the UGA law school teaching entertainment law and music law.

== Personal life ==
Downs still lives in Athens with his wife Katherine. They have two children. Downs enjoys spending time reading, walking, and all things basketball. He is a staunch supporter of public education. He created the Bertis E. Downs III and Eugene M. Downs, Sr. Education Abroad Fund at Davidson College to encourage students to travel widely while studying abroad.

Downs is active in many civic and political organizations and has served on the boards of People for the American Way, Network for Public Education, The National Education Association Foundation, Historic Athens, and the Georgia Trust for Historic Preservation.
