= Ken J. Miller =

American politician from North Carolina (1962–2024)

Member of the North Carolina House of Representatives from the 25th district
- In office 1995–1997
- Preceded by: Bertha Merrill Holt; James Fred Bowman; Nelson Cole
- Succeeded by: Nelson Cole

Personal details
- Born: Ken James Miller; August 27, 1962 New York, U.S.
- Died: March 5, 2024 (aged 61) Apopka, Florida, U.S.
- Party: Republican
- Spouse: Cathie

Ken James Miller (August 27, 1962 – March 5, 2024) was an American politician. He served as a Republican member of the North Carolina House of Representatives.

== Life and career ==
Miller was born in New York. He attended John S. Burke Catholic High School.

Miller served in the North Carolina House of Representatives from 1995 to 1997.

Miller died in Apopka, Florida, on March 5, 2024, at the age of 61.

North Carolina House of Representatives
| Preceded by Bertha Merrill Holt; James Fred Bowman; Nelson Cole | Member of the North Carolina House of Representatives from the 25th district 1995–1997 | Succeeded by Nelson Cole |
