= Pop Song 89 =

R.E.M. song

Single by R.E.M.

from the album Green
- B-side: "Pop Song 89" (acoustic version)
- Released: 16 May 1989 (US)
- Recorded: 1988
- Genre: Alternative rock; bubblegum pop; power pop
- Length: 3:03
- Label: Warner Bros.
- Songwriters: Bill Berry; Peter Buck; Mike Mills; Michael Stipe
- Producers: Scott Litt; R.E.M.

R.E.M. singles chronology
"Stand" (1989)	"Pop Song 89" (1989)	"Get Up" (1989)

"Pop Song 89" is the opening track and third single released from R.E.M.'s sixth studio album Green (1988). It peaked at number 86 on the Hot 100, and in the UK "Stand" was re-released instead.

Cash Box called it a "cynical parody of pop" but said that "it turns out they’ve created a pop hit despite themselves."

The video was directed by band frontman Michael Stipe and features him and three women, all of them topless, dancing to the song. When MTV asked Stipe to put censor bars on the three women in the video, he superimposed black bars on the chests of all four dancers, himself included, later stating, "a nipple is a nipple." The uncensored video would ultimately be made available through the band's YouTube channel in 2011, albeit with an age restriction attached.

The acoustic version that was used as the single's B-side was also included on disc 4 of the 1993 box set The Automatic Box, along with the other Green B-sides, and the bonus disc of the limited two-disc edition of In Time: The Best of R.E.M. 1988-2003 in 2003.

== Cover versions ==
Motion City Soundtrack covered the song on the Punk Goes 80's compilation album, released on Fearless Records in 2005.

== Track listing ==
All songs written by Bill Berry, Peter Buck, Mike Mills and Michael Stipe.

1. "Pop Song 89" – 3:03
2. "Pop Song 89" (acoustic) – 2:58

== Charts ==
=== Weekly charts ===
Chart (1989)	Peak position
Canada Top Singles (RPM)	94
Italy Airplay (Music & Media)	18
US Billboard Hot 100	86
US Alternative Airplay (Billboard)	16
US Mainstream Rock (Billboard)	14
