= Green (R.E.M. album) =

1988 studio album by R.E.M.

Studio album by R.E.M.
- Released: November 7, 1988
- Recorded: May–September 1988
- Studios: Ardent (Memphis); Bearsville (Woodstock)
- Genre: Alternative rock
- Length: 41:01
- Label: Warner Bros.
- Producers: Scott Litt; R.E.M.

R.E.M. chronology
Eponymous (1988)	Green (1988)	Pop Screen (1990)

Singles from Green
- 1. "Orange Crush" Released: December 1988; 2. "Stand" Released: January 1989; 3. "Pop Song 89" Released: May 1989; 4. "Get Up" Released: September 1989

Green promo cover
- Promotional copies of Green came in a cloth case with a debossed cover. The dark colors and texture were meant to go with the album's message of environmentalism.

Green is the sixth studio album by American rock band R.E.M., released in the UK / Europe on November 7, 1988, and the next day in the United States by Warner Bros. Records. The second album to be produced by the band and Scott Litt, it continued to explore political issues both in its lyrics and packaging. The band experimented on the album, writing major-key rock songs and incorporating new instruments into their sound including the mandolin, as well as switching their original instruments on other songs.

Green was a critical and commercial success. To promote Green, the band embarked on an 11-month world tour and released four singles from the album: "Orange Crush", "Stand", "Pop Song 89", and "Get Up".

== Background and recording ==
With the release of Document in 1987, R.E.M. fulfilled its contract with I.R.S. Records. Frustrated that its records did not see satisfactory overseas distribution, in early 1988 the band told I.R.S. head Jay Boberg that it was leaving the label. Guitarist Peter Buck also explained that his group felt it was being pressured to sell well by I.R.S., yet felt I.R.S.'s distributor MCA Records did not consider the ensemble a priority. R.E.M.'s management then approached any record companies that had expressed interest in the band. Though other labels offered more money, R.E.M. ultimately signed a deal with Warner Bros. Records—reportedly between $6 million and $12 million—due to the company's assurance of total creative freedom. In light of its move to a major label, the band became defensive in interviews against accusations from some fans who claimed it was selling out.

R.E.M. began the album process by recording demos at Robbie Collins' Underground Sound Recording Studio in Athens, Georgia in March 1988. Bill Berry, Peter Buck and Mike Mills recorded the basic tracks in two configurations: (1) drums, guitar, and bass, and (2) percussion, mandolin, and accordion. The demos were mixed by Robbie Collins, Buren Fowler (guitar tech for Peter Buck and later member of Drivin N Cryin), and David LaBruyere (later bassist for Vic Varney, Michelle Malone, and John Mayer) and presented to R.E.M. management. Two songs were recorded at the first of two sessions: "Song 1" (I Remember California) and "Song 2" (Eleventh Untitled Song). In April 1988 the band recorded more demos at John Keane Studios, also in Athens; some of these demos, including "Title," "Great Big," "Larry Graham" and "The Last R.E.M. Song," have never been commercially released. The demo "Larry Graham" was named for Sly and the Family Stone bassist Larry Graham, who was famous for his slap-bass style. "Larry Graham" has many similarities musically with Out of Time opener "Radio Song. "Title" was an older song which had been performed often on the Work Tour, but when demoed, was only recorded as an instrumental.

Just one month after signing with Warner Bros., the band recorded the basic tracks for Green at Ardent Studios' Studio A in Memphis, Tennessee from May 24 through July 5, 1988, with Scott Litt producing. Recording and mixing resumed later that month at Bearsville Studios in Bearsville, New York. Two new songs were recorded in Bearsville, one which became "Turn You Inside-Out" and one unreleased song. "Untitled" or "The Eleventh Untitled Song" was recorded under the working title of "Carnival" and even after the songs were mixed, still had the "Carnival" working title as late as 6 September 1988 before the band decided it wasn't to have a name on final release. "The Wrong Child" was recorded and mixed under the working title "Mozart." The Bearsville sessions continued until September 3, 1988 — barely two months before Green's release.

== Music ==
Guitarist Peter Buck interviewed in December 1988, shortly after the release of Green

Green marks the departure of the jangle pop and college rock styling of the band's previous albums. In a 1988 interview, Peter Buck described Green as an album that didn't feature any typical R.E.M. songs. Describing the band's standard output as "Minor key, mid-tempo, enigmatic, semi-folk-rock-balladish things", the guitarist noted that for Green, "We wrote major key rock songs and switched instruments." Singer Michael Stipe had reportedly told his bandmates to "not write any more R.E.M.-type songs". Bassist Mike Mills argued that Green was an experimental record, resulting in an album that was "haphazard, a little scattershot". Band biographer David Buckley wrote, "[S]onically, Green is all over the place, the result being a fascinatingly eclectic album rather than a unified artistic move forward". In a RTÉ review of the 25th anniversary edition of the album, R.E.M. stated the album was full of "big dumb bubblegum pop songs."

Green was envisioned as an album where one side would feature electric songs and the other, acoustic material, with the plan failing to come to fruition due to a lack of acoustic songs deemed fit for release. David Buckley highlighted three main musical strands on Green: "ironic pop songs" like "Stand" and "Pop Song 89", harder-hitting tracks such as "Orange Crush" and "Turn You Inside-Out", and "pastoral acoustic numbers" that had Peter Buck playing mandolin, with track 11 singled out as an anomaly. Buck had become fond of playing acoustic music with his friends in that period, and thus purchased an "oddly-shaped Italian mandolin-cum-lyre" in 1987; he would play the instrument on three of the tracks on Green. From this period onward, R.E.M. would swap instruments among members, and on Green the group also incorporated accordion, cello, and lap steel guitar.

== Artwork and packaging ==
The cover art was painted by New York City minimalist line painter Jon McCafferty. Promotional copies of the album were housed in a mauve, cloth-covered Digipack, with the title and artist debossed and a number "4" embossed over both of the "R"s. The color and texture are made to imitate tree bark.

The original pressings of the album and cassette tape covers had the number 4 spot varnished over the R in both "Green" and "R.E.M." In return, "R. Stand" appears instead of "4. Stand" on the track list on the back cover. Allegedly, this was a product of an early typing mistake: due to "4" being a number very close to "R" on the keyboard, "Green" was once misspelled "G4een", and the mistake was adopted this way. The album was the first by the band to feature printed lyrics, although only the lyrics to "World Leader Pretend" appeared.

Green is the first R.E.M. album to also be released in a special edition, though it was only released as a promotional CD. R.E.M. would go on to release a special edition of each of their subsequent albums, with the exception of their final studio album, 2011's Collapse into Now.

== Release and reception ==
Professional ratings
Review scores
Source	Rating
AllMusic	3.5/5 stars
Chicago Tribune	3/4 stars
Entertainment Weekly	B+
Los Angeles Times	3/4 stars
NME	9/10
Pitchfork	8.4/10
Q	5/5 stars
Rolling Stone	3.5/5 stars
Uncut	9/10
The Village Voice	B+

Green was released on November 7, 1988, in the United Kingdom, and the following day in the United States. R.E.M. chose the American release date to coincide with the 1988 presidential election, and used its increased profile during the period to criticize Republican candidate George H. W. Bush while praising Democratic candidate Michael Dukakis. With warm critical reaction and the conversion of many new fans, Green ultimately went double-platinum in the US, reaching number 12, and peaked at number 27 in the UK. "Orange Crush" became R.E.M.'s first American number one single on both the Mainstream and Modern Rock Tracks charts. It was the band's first gold album in the UK, making it the quartet's European breakthrough. "What I love about it is the immensely unlikely lyrics," remarked Neil Hannon, frontman of The Divine Comedy, "and, in the mandolin on 'You Are The Everything' and 'The Wrong Child', it's got a bit of what comes later but in a much purer way. It's so small and intense, it's amazing." Village Voice critic Robert Christgau praised the first half of the album, calling it "rousing, funny, serious, elegiac" while panning the second half for "dubious poetry and heavy tempos."

Some advance promo cassettes of the album, dating from September 1988, contained alternate mixes of "World Leader Pretend" (with different intro), "Turn You Inside-Out" (with different ending), and the untitled eleventh track (different drum mix). All of these mixes are otherwise unreleased.

The band toured extensively in support of the album throughout 1989, before beginning work on 1991's Out of Time. Green has gone on to sell four million copies worldwide.

R.E.M. supported the album with its biggest and most visually developed tour to date, featuring back-projections and art films playing on the stage. The tour was much larger in scope than the "Work" tour that supported the previous album. This was especially true in venues outside of the United States due to Warner Bros. Records' ability to market the band overseas. On the final night of the 11-month trek to support Green, at the Fox Theater, in Atlanta, Georgia, the band performed their first full-length album, Murmur, in order, from start to finish, followed by Green, in order, from start to finish. The night was concluded by an encore set performed by Microwave & the Melons—the road crew led by guitar tech Mark "Microwave" Mytrowitz. It marked the only live performance of "The Wrong Child," and one of the few live performances of "Hairshirt." After the Green tour, the band members unofficially decided to take the following year off, the first extended break in the group's career.

Some songs from Green—such as "Pop Song 89" and "Orange Crush"—had appeared occasionally on the "Work" tour in 1987. Though the lyrics were embryonic, the melodies and arrangements were similar to those that appeared on the finished record. Similarly, the band began playing versions of "Low" and "Belong" in the later part of the Green Tour, both of which would appear on their next album Out of Time.

Portions of the tour would be filmed for the band's first live video album Tourfilm.

The album was remastered in 2013 for its 25th anniversary, adding the bonus live album Live in Greensboro 1989 by Rhino Records; was released on May 14. Additionally, the EP Live in Greensboro EP was released on April 20 as a promotion for Record Store Day.

Nirvana singer and guitarist Kurt Cobain listed it in his top 50 albums of all time. In 1989, Sounds ranked the album at number 62 in its list of "The Top 80 Albums from the '80s." In 1993, The Times Magazine ranked the album at number 70 in their list of "The 100 Best Albums of All Time." In 2013, NME ranked it at number 274 in its list of the "500 Greatest Albums of All Time".

== Track listing ==
All songs written by Bill Berry, Peter Buck, Mike Mills, and Michael Stipe.

Air side
No.	Title	Length
1.	"Pop Song 89"	3:04
2.	"Get Up"	2:39
3.	"You Are the Everything"	3:41
4.	"Stand"	3:10
5.	"World Leader Pretend"	4:17
6.	"The Wrong Child"	3:36

Metal side
No.	Title	Length
1.	"Orange Crush"	3:51
2.	"Turn You Inside-Out"	4:16
3.	"Hairshirt"	3:55
4.	"I Remember California"	4:59
5.	Untitled	3:10

Notes

- Track 4 ("Stand") is listed on the album as track "R".
- Track 11, unlisted on the back cover and unnamed on the disc, is copyrighted under the title "11". It is listed on the digital download version of the 25th anniversary edition as simply "Untitled". An extended instrumental version released as a B-side on certain editions of "Stand" is titled "(The Eleventh Untitled Song)"

== Personnel ==
R.E.M.

- Bill Berry – drums, vocals, mandolin on "Hairshirt"
- Peter Buck – guitar, mandolin
- Mike Mills – bass, vocals, Mellotron, fuzz bass on "Pop Song 89"
- Michael Stipe – vocals

Additional musicians

- Bucky Baxter – pedal steel guitar on "World Leader Pretend"
- Keith LeBlanc – percussion on "Turn You Inside-Out"
- Jane Scarpantoni – cello on "World Leader Pretend"

Production

- Bill Berry – production
- Peter Buck – production
- Thom Cadley – engineering (Bearsville)
- Jem Cohen – photography
- George Cowan – engineering (Bearsville)
- Jay Healy – engineering
- Tom Laune – engineering (Ardent)
- Scott Litt – production, engineering
- Bob Ludwig – mastering, at Masterdisk, New York City, New York, United States
- Jon McCafferty – packaging and photography
- Mike Mills – production
- Frank Olinsky and Manhattan Design – packaging
- Michael Stipe – production, packaging, and photography
- Michael Tighe – photography

== Chart positions ==
=== Weekly charts ===
Chart (1988–1989)	Peak position
Australian Albums (ARIA)	16
New Zealand Albums (RMNZ)	6
UK Albums (Official Charts)	27
US Billboard 200	12

Chart (2013)	Peak position
Belgian Albums (Ultratop Flanders)	108

=== Year-end charts ===
Chart (1989)	Position
New Zealand Albums (RMNZ)	29
US Billboard 200	22

=== Singles ===
Year	Song	Chart	Position
1988	"Orange Crush"	Billboard Modern Rock Tracks	1
1988	"Orange Crush"	Billboard Mainstream Rock Tracks	1
1988	"Pop Song 89"	Billboard Modern Rock Tracks	16
1988	"Stand"	Billboard Mainstream Rock Tracks	1
1988	"Stand"	Billboard Modern Rock Tracks	1
1989	"Pop Song 89"	Billboard Mainstream Rock Tracks	14
1989	"Pop Song 89"	Billboard Hot 100	86
1989	"Stand"	Billboard Hot 100	6
1989	"Turn You Inside-Out"	Billboard Mainstream Rock Tracks	7
1989	"Turn You Inside-Out"	Billboard Modern Rock Tracks	10
1989	"Stand"	UK Singles Chart	51
1989	"Orange Crush"	UK Singles Chart	28
1989	"Stand" (re-release)	UK Singles Chart	48

== Certifications ==
Region	Certification	Certified units/sales
Canada (Music Canada)	2× Platinum	200,000^{^}
New Zealand (RMNZ)	Gold	7,500^{^}
Spain (Promusicae)	Gold	50,000^{^}
United Kingdom (BPI)	Platinum	300,000^{^}
United States (RIAA)	2× Platinum	2,000,000^{^}
^{^} Shipments figures based on certification alone.

== Release history ==
In 2005, Warner Bros. Records issued an expanded two-disc edition of Green which includes a CD, a DVD-Audio disc containing a 5.1-channel surround sound mix by Elliot Scheiner, lyrics, and the original CD booklet with expanded liner notes.

Green

Region	Date	Label	Format	Catalog
United Kingdom	November 7, 1988	Warner Bros.	vinyl LP	WX 234
United Kingdom	November 7, 1988	Warner Bros.	Compact Disc	7599-25795-2
United States	November 8, 1988	Warner Bros.	LP	1-25795
United States	November 8, 1988	Warner Bros.	Compact Disc	2-25795
United States	November 8, 1988	Warner Bros.	cassette tape	4-25795
Canada	November 8, 1988	Warner Music Canada	LP	1-25795
Canada	November 8, 1988	Warner Music Canada	Compact Disc	2-25795
Canada	November 8, 1988	Warner Music Canada	cassette tape	4-25795
Germany	November 11, 1988	Warner Music Germany	Compact Disc	7599-25795-2
Japan	December 10, 1988	Warner Music Japan	Compact Disc	25P2-2389
Argentina	1988	Warner Bros.	LP	WEA 80127
Brazil	1988	Warner Bros.	LP	6708035
Greece	1988	Warner Bros.	LP	925795-1
Israel	1988	Warner Bros.	LP	BAN 925773-1
Mexico	1988	Warner Bros.	LP	LXWB-6813
Peru	1988	Warner Bros.	cassette tape	cn-wbr-0257945-4
South Africa	1988	Warner Bros./Tusk	LP	WBC 1654
South Africa	1988	Warner Bros./Tusk	Compact Disc	WBCD 1654
Australia	1995	Warner Bros.	Compact Disc	9257952
United States	2005	Warner Bros.	Compact Disc/DVD-Audio DualDisc	73948
United States	May 14, 2013	Warner Bros.	Compact Disc	8122796570††

Note

- †† 25th anniversary edition, with bonus disc

Box sets

Region	Date	Label	Format	Catalog	Notes
Australia	1995	Warner Bros.	Compact Disc box set	9362460742	Packaged with Out of Time
Argentina	1998	Warner Bros.	Compact Disc box set	9362 47180-2	Packaged with New Adventures in Hi-Fi, entitled "Doble Dosis"
France	1998	WEA	Compact Disc box set	WE 872	Packaged with New Adventures in Hi-Fi
