= Orange Crush (song) =

1988 single by R.E.M

Single by R.E.M.

from the album Green
- B-side: "Ghost Rider", "Dark Globe"
- Released: December 1988
- Recorded: 1988
- Genre: Alternative rock; power pop
- Length: 3:51
- Label: Warner Bros.
- Songwriters: Bill Berry; Peter Buck; Mike Mills; Michael Stipe
- Producers: Scott Litt; R.E.M.

R.E.M. singles chronology
"Finest Worksong" (1988)	"Orange Crush" (1988)	"Stand" (1989)

"Orange Crush" is a song by the American alternative rock band R.E.M. It was released as the first single from the band's sixth studio album, Green, in 1988. It was not commercially released in the U.S. despite reaching number one as a promotional single on both the Mainstream and Modern Rock Tracks (where, at the time, it had the record for longest stay at number one with eight weeks, beating U2). It peaked at number 28 on the UK Singles Chart, making it the band's then-highest chart hit in Britain, where they promoted the song by making their debut appearance on Top of the Pops.

The video for the song, directed by Matt Mahurin, won the band its first VMA, for Best Post-Modern Video. "Orange Crush" was also the first song to win in the category. The video, shot exclusively in black and white, does not feature the band at all.

The song was placed on R.E.M.'s Warner Bros. Records compilation In Time: The Best of R.E.M. 1988–2003 in 2003, and a live version appears on the R.E.M. Live album recorded in Dublin in 2005.

The song's title refers to the chemical defoliant Agent Orange manufactured by Monsanto Corporation and Dow Chemical for the U.S. Defense Department and used in the Vietnam War.

Stipe opened the song during the Green World Tour by singing the U.S. Army recruiting slogan, "Be all you can be... in the Army." Stipe's father served in the Vietnam War.

== Track listing ==
=== UK 3" CD W2960CD ===
1. "Orange Crush" (Bill Berry, Peter Buck, Mike Mills, Michael Stipe) - 3:50
2. "Ghost Rider" (Suicide cover, written by Martin Reverby, Alan Vega) - 3:45
3. "Dark Globe" (Syd Barrett) - 1:52

== Personnel ==
- Bill Berry – drums, vocals
- Peter Buck – guitar
- Mike Mills – bass, vocals
- Michael Stipe – vocals

== Charts ==
=== Weekly charts ===
Weekly chart performance for "Orange Crush"
Chart (1988–1989)	Peak position
Australia (ARIA)	15
Europe (Eurochart Hot 100)	87
Ireland (IRMA)	21
New Zealand (Recorded Music NZ)	5
UK Singles (OCC)	28
US Alternative Airplay (Billboard)	1
US Mainstream Rock (Billboard)	1

=== Year-end charts ===
Year-end chart performance for "Orange Crush"
Chart (1989)	Position
US Album Rock Tracks (Billboard)	17
US Modern Rock Tracks (Billboard)	13

== Certifications ==
Certifications for "Orange Crush"
Region	Certification	Certified units/sales
New Zealand (RMNZ)	Gold	15,000^{‡}
^{‡} Sales+streaming figures based on certification alone.

== See also ==
- List of anti-war songs
