= Succumbs =

Video by R.E.M.
- Released: October 1987
- Genre: Alternative rock
- Label: UNI/A&M

R.E.M. albums chronology
Document (1987)	Succumbs (1987)	Eponymous (1988)

R.E.M. video chronology
Succumbs (1987)	Tourfilm (1990)

Succumbs is R.E.M.'s first commercially available full-length movie. Released in October 1987 by UNI/A&M, it contains video footage shot by R.E.M.'s lead singer Michael Stipe dating back to the early-1980s, while the band was still recording under the I.R.S. Records label. Stipe collaborated with local Athens, Georgia artist James Herbert, who directed Left of Reckoning.

Succumbs offers a glimpse of the unique feel of the band before their commercial success. It was released only on VHS and laserdisc, however, all the videos contained in this package are included on the When the Light Is Mine DVD, released in September 2006.

An introductory clip at the beginning of the collection features guitarist Peter Buck and the band's then-manager, Jefferson Holt, introducing "citizens of the future" to an "outmoded artform" called the "video", predicting it would have a staying power similar to that of Nehru jackets and other forgotten fads.

== Videos ==
All tracks written by Bill Berry, Peter Buck, Mike Mills and Michael Stipe.

1. (Peter Buck and Jefferson Holt intro)
2. "Radio Free Europe"
3. "So. Central Rain"
4. "Left of Reckoning":
  .. (rain snippet)
  .. (Written intro for Reckoning)
  .. (segues into) "Harborcoat"
  .. (segues into) "7 Chinese Brothers"
  .. (segues into) "So. Central Rain"
  .. (segues into) "Pretty Persuasion"
  .. (segues into) "Time After Time (Annelise)"
  .. (snippet)
5. "Cant Get There from Here"
6. (Michael Stipe railroads monologue)
7. (segues into) "Driver 8"
8. "Life and How to Live It"
9. "Feeling Gravitys Pull"
10. "Fall on Me"
