= Stand (R.E.M. song) =

1989 single by R.E.M.

Single by R.E.M.

from the album Green
- B-side: "Memphis Train Blues"
- Released: January 1989
- Genre: Pop rock; sunshine pop; bubblegum pop
- Length: 3:10
- Label: Warner Bros.
- Songwriters: Bill Berry; Peter Buck; Mike Mills; Michael Stipe
- Producers: Scott Litt; R.E.M.

R.E.M. singles chronology
"Orange Crush" (1988)	"Stand" (1989)	"Pop Song 89" (1989)

Music video
- "Stand" on YouTube

"Stand" is a song by the American alternative rock band R.E.M., released as the second single from the album Green (1988) in 1989. The song peaked at number six on the Billboard Hot 100, becoming R.E.M.'s second top 10 hit in the United States, and topped both the Mainstream Rock Tracks and Modern Rock Tracks charts. The song reached number 48 on the UK Singles Chart and number 16 in Canada. It was placed on R.E.M.'s Warner Bros. Records "best of" album In Time: The Best of R.E.M. 1988–2003 in 2003, as well as the 2011 compilation album Part Lies, Part Heart, Part Truth, Part Garbage.

The song is an example of phrase modulation, as the last two rounds of the chorus are each one whole step higher than the one previous. The song is meant to be a self-aware "tongue-in-cheek" 1960s-esque bubblegum pop song, meant to resemble the music of The Banana Splits, The Archies and The Monkees. "Stand" was used as the theme song for the 1990–1992 Fox sitcom Get a Life, starring Chris Elliott. It was parodied by "Weird Al" Yankovic as the song "Spam" on the album UHF – Original Motion Picture Soundtrack and Other Stuff. While the song was originally published by Night Garden Music, with administration by Warner-Tamerlane Publishing Corp. (BMI), it is now administered by Universal Tunes (SESAC).

Friend of the band, Georgina Falzarano, inspired some of the lyrical content of the song. "It was based on a conversation with Georgina about directions, which way is north, which way is south, and so on, and Georgina's response was, 'I have a really bad time with directions but I know my house faces south,'" said Norm Spencley, Falzarano's partner of 24 years.

== Meaning ==
Singer Michael Stipe has said of the song's meaning, "It's about making decisions and actually living your life rather than letting it happen." Stipe has said of the song's origin that he and the other band members were discussing The Banana Splits, The Archies, The Monkees, and similar 1960s pop groups. "They threw these super bubblegummy songs at me, and I said, 'I'll raise you and see you one.' And I wrote the most inane lyrics that I could possibly write. Now, it was a very intentional thing to do that. I really like most of those songs, in fact." Guitarist Peter Buck described "Stand" as "without a doubt, [...] the stupidest song we've ever written. That's not necessarily a bad thing though", comparing the song to "Louie Louie" by the Kingsmen in terms of "stupid" lyrical content.

== Critical reception ==
Betty Page from Record Mirror commented, "Ah, this Michael Stipe — a god amongst men, apparently (along with Michael Hutchence, of course). What a curiously endearing accent the boy has. This is one of the REMers' more commercial gems — quirky but with an appealing guitar noise and a very nice tune to boot. This would make me want to go and listen to the LP, which I suppose is the idea. Stipe, you have Presence with a capital P." The song was called "A splendid pop song...simultaneously stupid and profound. Stipe writes about the need for orientation in one's life, as if based on a series of steps for an unknown, invented, dance."

== Track listing ==
All songs written by Berry, Buck, Mills and Stipe except where indicated.

1st issue

7-inch and cassette single

1. "Stand" – 3:10
2. "Memphis Train Blues" – 1:38

12-inch and mini-CD single

1. "Stand" – 3:09
2. "Memphis Train Blues" – 1:37
3. "(The Eleventh Untitled Song)" – 3:56

Notes: The UK mini-CD single with the catalogue number W7577 CDX came in a leaf-shaped sleeve.

"(The Eleventh Untitled Song)" is an extended instrumental version of the closing (eleventh) unlisted (untitled) track from the album Green.

2nd issue – released later in 1989 with different cover art (a picture of the band on stage) in the UK instead of "Pop Song 89."

1. "Stand" – 3:09
2. "Pop Song 89" (Acoustic) – 2:56
3. "Skin Tight" (Live Ohio Players cover, written by Jones, Pierce, Bonner, Middlebrooks) – 2:03

Note: live track recorded in Orlando, Florida, April 30, 1989

== Personnel ==
- Bill Berry – drums, vocals
- Peter Buck – guitar
- Mike Mills – bass, vocals
- Michael Stipe – vocals

== Charts ==
=== Weekly charts ===
Chart (1989)	Peak position
Australia (ARIA)	56
Canada Top Singles (RPM)	8
Ireland (IRMA)	17
Italy Airplay (Music & Media)	14
UK Singles (Official Charts)	48
US Billboard Hot 100	6
US Alternative Airplay (Billboard)	1
US Mainstream Rock (Billboard)	1
US Cash Box Top 100	6

=== Year-end charts ===
Chart (1989)	Position
Canada Top Singles (RPM)	87
US Billboard Hot 100	76
US Album Rock Tracks (Billboard)	11
US Modern Rock Tracks (Billboard)	4
