= Document (album) =

1987 album by R.E.M.

Studio album by R.E.M.
- Released: August 31, 1987
- Recorded: March–May 1987
- Studio: Sound Emporium (Nashville, Tennessee)
- Genre: Alternative rock
- Length: 39:30
- Label: I.R.S.
- Producers: Scott Litt; R.E.M.

R.E.M. chronology
Dead Letter Office (1987)	Document (1987)	Succumbs (1987)

Singles from Document
- 1. "The One I Love" Released: August 24, 1987; 2. "It's the End of the World as We Know It (And I Feel Fine)" Released: November 16, 1987; 3. "Finest Worksong" Released: March 1988

Document is the fifth studio album by American rock band R.E.M., released on August 31, 1987, by I.R.S. Records. It was their first album to be co-produced by the band and Scott Litt. Continuing in the vein of their previous album Lifes Rich Pageant, Document features more audible lyrics and a harder rock sound in comparison to the band's earlier releases. The album became R.E.M.'s greatest success at the time, giving the band their first Top 10 hit ("The One I Love") and album, peaking at number 10 on the Billboard 200.

== Composition ==
Document was R.E.M.'s first album to be co-produced by the band and Scott Litt; this was a collaboration that continued through the productions of Green, Out of Time, Automatic for the People, Monster, and New Adventures in Hi-Fi. The album's clear production and muscular rock riffs both helped to move the band toward mainstream success and built on the work done by Don Gehman, who had produced their previous album Lifes Rich Pageant. This release not only launched "The One I Love" — R.E.M.'s first Top 10 hit on the Billboard Hot 100 at number 9 — but also gave them their first platinum album.

R.E.M. expanded their instrumentation somewhat on the album, adding a dulcimer to "King of Birds" and a saxophone to "Fireplace". Steve Berlin was brought in to add his saxophone skills because of a prior relationship with producer Scott Litt. This experimentation would lead to their adoption of the mandolin, which featured prominently on their subsequent albums Green and Out of Time; furthermore, the band's musicians began swapping instruments both in concert and the studio with an effort to create new sounds and avoid stagnation.

The song "Strange" was originally recorded by post-punk band Wire on their debut album Pink Flag.

== Packaging ==
The original sleeve for the album featured the message "File under Fire", a reference to what Michael Stipe considered to be the central lyrical theme of the album, and also references the chorus to "The One I Love". A similar message ("File under water") could be found on the cover of the band's second album, Reckoning, as well as on the compilation album Eponymous ("File under grain") referring to the idea behind "Talk About the Passion", which was about hunger. Two rejected suggestions for the title of the album—R.E.M. No. 5 and Table of Content—also appear on the sleeve artwork. Other possible album titles included Mr. Evil Breakfast, Skin Up with R.E.M., and Last Train to Disneyland (the last one having been suggested by Peter Buck, who felt that America under the presidency of Ronald Reagan was beginning to feel a lot like the famed amusement park).

== Critical reception ==
Professional ratings
Review scores
Source	Rating
AllMusic	4.5/5 stars
Chicago Tribune	3.5/4 stars
Christgau's Record Guide	A
Entertainment Weekly	A−
Los Angeles Times	3.5/4 stars
Pitchfork	8.2/10
Q	4/5 stars
Rolling Stone	5/5 stars
The Rolling Stone Album Guide	4.5/5 stars
Uncut	9/10

In a contemporary review for The Village Voice, Robert Christgau said that R.E.M. had moved on from their past work's escapism and that "their discovery of the outside world has sharpened their sense of humor along with everything else", citing "It's the End of the World as We Know It (And I Feel Fine)" as an "inspirational title". Rolling Stone reviewer David Fricke felt that the album was R.E.M.'s "finest to date", and said that "Document is the sound of R.E.M. on the move".

Los Angeles Times critic Chris Willman complimented the diversity of the music and themes, observing, "Document is a tougher, meaner, leaner record than its immediate predecessors—replacing the jangly, sprightly, romantic sound the band became known for with a far more hard-edged guitar sound, as well as tenser rock rhythms. It's predictably cryptic indeed at times, but the opaque mystery that was so enticingly R.E.M. has been largely replaced here with something more definite and immediately tangible."

Uncut's Andrew Mueller praised Document in a retrospective review, saying, "If 1986's Lifes Rich Pageant had marked the beginnings of R.E.M.'s emergence from their cocoon of indie diffidence, 1987's Document was where they first properly reconciled themselves to their destiny as the only group of the 1980s American college-rock milieu to graduate to stadiums, and stay there." David Browne of Entertainment Weekly observed, "The record that gave R.E.M. a top 10 hit ('The One I Love') mostly does no more than consolidate their strengths but has moments of undeniable power and the most sardonic apocalypse ever recorded, 'It's the End of the World as We Know It (and I Feel Fine).'" Stephen Thomas Erlewine of AllMusic said that "where Lifes Rich Pageant sounded a bit like a party record, Document is a fiery statement, and its memorable melodies and riffs are made all the more indelible by its righteous anger."

Rolling Stone went on to include Document in their list of the 100 greatest albums of the 1980s (in 41st place), and then ranked it number 462 on 2012 list of the 500 Greatest Albums of All Time. In 2012, Slant Magazine listed the album at number 17 on its list of "Best Albums of the 1980s".

== Reissue ==
In 1999, the album was remastered by Bob Ludwig and re-released on Compact Disc by I.R.S. Records in the United States. This version came in a replica of the record sleeve made of cardboard. In 2005, Capitol Records (whose then parent company EMI at that time owned I.R.S. Records' catalog) issued an expanded DualDisc edition of Document which includes a digitally remastered version of the album on the CD side, a DVD-Audio, DTS and Dolby Digital 5.1-channel surround sound mix of the album done by Elliot Scheiner on the DVD side, and the original CD booklet.

== Track listing ==
All songs were written by Bill Berry, Peter Buck, Mike Mills and Michael Stipe, except "Strange" by Wire (Bruce Gilbert, Graham Lewis, Colin Newman and Robert Grey).

Side one – "Page side"

1. "Finest Worksong" – 3:48
2. "Welcome to the Occupation" – 2:46
3. "Exhuming McCarthy" – 3:19
4. "Disturbance at the Heron House" – 3:31
5. "Strange" – 2:31
6. "It's the End of the World as We Know It (And I Feel Fine)" – 4:06

Side two – "Leaf side"

1. "The One I Love" – 3:17
2. "Fireplace" – 3:22
3. "Lightnin' Hopkins" – 3:20
4. "King of Birds" – 4:09
5. "Oddfellows Local 151" – 5:21

== Personnel ==
R.E.M.

- Bill Berry – drums, vocals
- Peter Buck – guitar, dulcimer
- Mike Mills – bass, vocals
- Michael Stipe – vocals

Additional musicians

- Steve Berlin – horns
- Carl Marsh – Fairlight CMI

Production

- Scott Litt – production
- R.E.M. – production
- Steve Catania – engineering
- Tom Der – engineering
- Toni Greene – engineering
- Gary Laney – engineering
- Ted Pattison – engineering
- Todd Scholar – engineering
- Bob Ludwig – mastering at Masterdisk, New York City, New York, United States; remastered at Gateway Mastering, Portland, Maine, United States in June 1999
- Elliot Scheiner – mixing on 2005 re-release
- Jim McKay – photography
- Michael Meister – photography
- Sandra-Lee Phipps – photography
- Ron Scarselli – packaging

== Chart positions ==
=== Weekly charts ===
Chart (1987)	Peak position
Australia (Kent Music Report)	47
Canada (RPM)	13
UK Albums Chart	28
US Billboard 200	10

=== Year-end charts ===
Year	Chart	Position
1987	US Billboard 200	83
1988	US Billboard 200	68

=== Singles ===
Year	Song	Chart	Position
1987	"The One I Love"	Billboard Hot 100	9
1987	"The One I Love"	Ireland (IRMA)	5
1987	"The One I Love"	Australia (Kent Music Report)	84
1987	"The One I Love"	New Zealand (RMNZ)	6
1987	"The One I Love"	Canada (RPM)	14
1987	"It's the End of the World as We Know It (And I Feel Fine)"	Billboard Mainstream Rock Tracks	16
1987	"It's the End of the World as We Know It (And I Feel Fine)"	Billboard Hot 100	69
1988	"The One I Love"	Billboard Mainstream Rock Tracks	2
1988	"The One I Love"	UK Singles Chart	51
1988	"Finest Worksong"	Billboard Mainstream Rock Tracks	28
1988	"Finest Worksong"	UK Singles Chart	50
1991	"The One I Love"	UK Singles Chart	16
1991	"It's the End of the World as We Know It (And I Feel Fine)"	UK Singles Chart	39

== Certifications ==
Region	Certification	Certified units/sales
Canada (Music Canada)	Platinum	100,000^{^}
United Kingdom (BPI)	Gold	100,000^{^}
United States (RIAA)	Platinum	1,000,000^{^}
^{*} Sales figures based on certification alone.^{^} Shipments figures based on certification alone.

== Release history ==
Region	Date	Label	Format	Catalog
United States	August 31, 1987	I.R.S.	vinyl LP	IRS-42059
United States	August 31, 1987	I.R.S.	Compact Disc	IRSD-42059
United States	August 31, 1987	I.R.S.	cassette tape	IRSC-42059
Canada	August 31, 1987	I.R.S.	LP	IRS-42059
Canada	August 31, 1987	I.R.S.	Compact Disc	IRSD-42059
Canada	August 31, 1987	I.R.S.	cassette tape	IRSC-42059
The Netherlands	August 31, 1987	I.R.S.	LP	ILP 460105 1
United Kingdom	September 14, 1987	I.R.S.	LP	MIRG 1025
United Kingdom	September 14, 1987	I.R.S.	Compact Disc	DMIRG 1025
United Kingdom	September 14, 1987	I.R.S.	cassette tape	MIRGC 1025
Japan	October 21, 1987	I.R.S.	LP	28AP-3382
Australia	1987	I.R.S.	LP	460105 1
Brazil	1987	Epic	LP	231111
Germany	1987	I.R.S.	LP	ILP 460105 1
Germany	1987	I.R.S.	Compact Disc	DIR 460105 2
Germany	1987	I.R.S.	cassette tape	IMC 460105 4
Greece	1987	I.R.S./CBS	LP	ILP 460105 1
New Zealand	1987	I.R.S.	LP	460105 1
Zimbabwe	1988	CBS	LP	ASF-3174
Worldwide	1990	MCA	Compact Disc	42059
Worldwide	1990	I.R.S.	cassette tape	IRSC-42059
Worldwide	1992	Universal	Compact Disc	19144
The Netherlands	May 11, 1993	I.R.S.	Compact Disc	7 13200 2 6†
Brazil	1993	EMI	Compact Disc	7 13200-2
Worldwide	1993	EMI	Compact Disc	1508
United Kingdom	September 1, 1997	I.R.S.	LP	0777/CTMCD 337†
Worldwide	1997	EMI	Compact Disc	337
Worldwide	1998	Capitol	Compact Disc	93480
Worldwide	1999	Capitol	Compact Disc	21276
United States	1999	I.R.S.	LP	724349946613-4
United States	1999	I.R.S.	Compact Disc	72435-21276-2-7‡
Europe	1999	EMI	Compact Disc	13200†
United States	2000	EMI	LP	499466
United States	2003	Capitol	DVD-Audio	90149•
United States	2005	Capitol	DualDisc	99398•
United States	2008	Capitol	LP	220591
United States	September 25, 2012	Capitol / EMI	Compact Disc	5099997200628††

Notes

- † I.R.S. Vintage Years edition, with bonus tracks
- ‡ Compact Disc remastered edition
- • DualDisc remastered edition
- †† 25th anniversary edition, with bonus disc
- A truncated edition of Document was also issued on Armed Forces Radio—catalogue number P-24576—with "Finest Worksong", "Welcome to the Occupation", "Fireplace", "Lightnin' Hopkins", and "King of Birds" on one side and tracks from Pink Floyd's A Momentary Lapse of Reason on the other.
