= Bertha Merrill Holt =

American politician

Bertha "B" Holt

Member of the North Carolina House of Representatives from the 29th district
- In office 1975–1994
- Preceded by: John D. Long

Personal details
- Born: August 16, 1916 Eufaula, Alabama, U.S.
- Died: June 18, 2010 (aged 93) Burlington, North Carolina, U.S.
- Party: Democratic
- Spouse: Clary Holt
- Education: Agnes Scott, University of North Carolina - Chapel Hill, University of Alabama

Bertha Merrill "B" Holt (August 16, 1916 – June 18, 2010) was an American politician who represented Alamance and Rockingham counties in the North Carolina State House of Representatives from 1975 to 1993, where she championed North Carolina's failed attempt to ratify the Equal Rights Amendment and led the successful effort to remove the exemption of husbands from the state's rape laws. In addition, she was active in the Episcopal Church and was a founding member of the Alamance Women's Political Caucus and the Woman's Resource Center.

== Early life ==
Holt was born in Eufaula, Alabama, and was the oldest of her five sisters. She came from a long family line of lawyers: her great-grandfather, grandfather, and father were all practicing attorneys.

In 1938 she received her bachelor's degree in psychology from Agnes Scott College in Georgia and then became one of the first women to attend law school at the University of North Carolina before transferring to finish her law degree at the University of Alabama in 1941.

From Alabama Holt moved to Washington, D.C., where she worked for the Treasury and the Department of the Interior. She reconnected with Clary Holt whom she had met at University of North Carolina and would later marry. After World War II Bertha and Clary Holt moved to Burlington, North Carolina, and raised three children, a daughter, Harriet, and two sons, Merrill and Jefferson Holt.

She was the first woman to serve on her Episcopal Church vestry, later serving as its senior warden and as a member of North Carolina's Diocesan Council. She was the first woman to serve on the Bishop's Committee of the Episcopal Church in North Carolina.

In 1975, Holt was appointed to the North Carolina House of Representatives and became the first woman to ever represent her district of Alamance and Rockingham counties. Voters returned her to office for eight consecutive terms - a total of 19 years. She established a distinguished record of public service. She was a founding member of the Alamance Women's Political Caucus in 1988 and of the Women's Resource Center in Alamance County in 1989. In 1995, she was a member of the delegation to the Fourth United Nations Conference on Women in Beijing.

== Political career ==
Holt was appointed by Governor James Holshouser to fill a seat vacated by John D. Long on August 18, 1975. North Carolina was embroiled in a heated debate over the Equal Rights Amendment and Holt quickly emerged as a steadfast proponent. Ultimately it was defeated.

During her career Holt sponsored many notable bills in the legislature including clarifying a judge's decision to decide what will become of firearms involved in crimes, insuring women cannot be charged with indecent exposure for breastfeeding, and solidifying the right of government employees to participate in political movements

A cornerstone of her political career was the removal of a husband's exemption from North Carolina rape laws. Previous to 1993 the law stated that "a person may not be prosecuted under this article if the victim is the person's legal spouse at the time of the commission of the alleged rape or sexual assault" The language of the statute was changed to specifically bar marital status as a defense in this crime. After she left the House of Representatives Holt later lamented "I worked on legislation about domestic violence and they're still working on it today. We haven't come far enough."

After her death North Carolina State House Speaker Joe Hackney said "[d]uring her nearly 20 years in the North Carolina House of Representatives, she proved to be a dedicated and highly competent lawmaker and a pioneering female lawyer who mentored many of the women who followed her into the legislature."

== Religion ==
Holt remained active in the Episcopal Church throughout her life. She became the first woman to serve on her local vestry, served as a member of North Carolina's Diocesan Council, and served on the Bishop's Committee of the Episcopal Church of North Carolina. During her funeral Bishop Michael Curry gave an impassioned homily, lauding her efforts to support people who have begun at a disadvantage both in the Episcopal Church and in politics even remarking "I stand here because of that woman and good people like her."

== Awards ==
In 1996 Holt was acknowledged as a Distinguished Alumnus by the University of North Carolina General Alumni Association. In 2007, Holt received an honorary Doctor of Laws from Agnes Scott College. She was honored by the ACLU with the Frank Porter Graham Award in 2009.
