= Finest Worksong =

Song by R.E.M

Single by R.E.M.

from the album Document
- B-side: "Time After Time, Etc." (Live)
- Released: March 1988
- Recorded: 1987
- Studio: Sound Emporium (Nashville, Tennessee)
- Genre: Alternative rock; funk metal
- Length: 3:48
- Label: I.R.S.
- Songwriters: Bill Berry; Peter Buck; Mike Mills; Michael Stipe
- Producers: Scott Litt; R.E.M.

R.E.M. singles chronology
"It's the End of the World as We Know It (And I Feel Fine)" (1987)	"Finest Worksong" (1988)	"Orange Crush" (1988)

"Finest Worksong" is the third and final single released from R.E.M.'s fifth studio album Document (1987). It peaked at number 50 on the UK Singles Chart in April 1988, at the time the group's highest-charting single in the UK.

The single version of the song (also known as Mutual Drum Horn mix), featuring a new horn section by The Uptown Horns, was placed on R.E.M.'s I.R.S. Records compilation Eponymous. This was the last original single the band released on I.R.S. Records.

== Track listing ==
All songs written by Bill Berry, Peter Buck, Mike Mills and Michael Stipe.

7" single

1. "Finest Worksong" – 3:50
2. "Time After Time, Etc." (Live)^{1} – 8:22

12" single and 3" CD single

1. "Finest Worksong" – 3:50
2. "Time After Time, Etc." (Live)^{1} – 8:22
3. "Finest Worksong" (Lengthy Club mix) – 5:52
4. "Finest Worksong" (Other mix) – 3:47

UK CD single

1. "Finest Worksong"
2. "Time After Time, Etc." (Live)^{1}
3. "It's the End of the World as We Know It (And I Feel Fine)"

=== Notes ===
^{1} Recorded at the Muziekcentrum Vredenburg, Utrecht, Netherlands, September 14, 1987, this live medley included "Time After Time (AnnElise)", a snippet of Peter Gabriel's "Red Rain" and "So. Central Rain (I'm Sorry)"

== Charts ==
Chart (1988)	Peak position
UK Singles Chart	50
US Billboard Hot Mainstream Rock Tracks	28

== Lyrics ==
Per Stipe in an interview with Reveal, the intent "was to attack 'the idea that you can work and work, and get what you want, and then try for even more. It's the American dream, but it's a pipe dream that's been exploited for years.'" It has also been described as a "musical portrait of a disenchanted worker. Michael Stipe sings, 'Take your instinct by the reins You'd better best to rearrange What we want and what we need Has been confused been confused.'"
