= Jefferson Holt =

American music manager

Jefferson Holt is the founder of Daniel 13 Press and manager of rock band R.E.M. from 1981 to 1996.

Under the name Vibrating Egg, Holt recorded a five-song EP on his label Dog Gone Records that included R.E.M.'s Mike Mills on bass.

In 1996, Holt and R.E.M. parted ways, allegedly due to complaints that Holt had a pattern of sexual harassment towards R.E.M.'s support staff. When asked about leaving the band, he offered this statement to Chuck Philips L. A. Times staff writer: "I've agreed to keep the terms of my agreement with R.E.M. confidential, however, 15 years is a long time, and as time passed, our friendships have changed. I think we found as time passed that we have less and less in common. I've become more interested in other things in life and wanted to spend more time pursuing those interests. I'm happier than I have been in a long time."

Representatives for R.E.M. released a statement that said the band and Holt terminated their relationship by mutual agreement. According to the statement: "The reasons for this decision and terms of the termination are private and confidential, and no further discussion of these matters will be made by any of these parties."

Holt lives with his family in North Carolina, where he collects art and memorabilia, publishes books, and pursues sundry philanthropic interests, including artistic patronage to emerging artists, photographers, musicians, and writers.

Holt is also the publisher for Daniel 13 Press, publishing photographic books by amateur and professionals.

His mother was Bertha "B" Holt, member of the North Carolina State House of Representatives. The childhood home of Jefferson Holt, the house of Bertha Holt, is featured in 509, a limited book edition by Pamela Pecchio.

== References to Holt in R.E.M. songs ==
Holt is referenced in the song "Little America," from 1984's Reckoning album. The song's (and album's) last line, "Jefferson, I think we're lost," was changed to "Washington, I think we're lost" when the song was revived for live shows, as evidenced in a 2007 performance on the two-CD Live at The Olympia set in 2009.

Holt is also referenced in the song "Can't Get There from Here" from 1985's Fables of the Reconstruction. A line in the second verse is, "Lawyer Jeff he knows the low-down".
