= Scott Litt =

American record producer

- Born: March 10, 1954 (age 72)
- Origin: United States
- Occupation: Record producer
- Years active: 1970s–present
- Label: Outpost Recordings

Scott Warren Litt (born March 10, 1954) is an American record producer who mostly works with artists in the alternative rock genre and is best known for producing six R.E.M. albums in the late 1980s and early to mid-1990s during the band's most successful period.

== Biography ==
Litt began as an engineer in the late 1970s, working on recordings by Ian Hunter and Carly Simon. He made his debut as a producer with The dB's Repercussion album in 1982, going on to work with Chris Stamey, Matthew Sweet, and Beat Rodeo. His breakthrough as a producer came in 1987 with R.E.M.'s Document album. Litt had first worked with the band on the track "Romance" for a film soundtrack, and went on to enjoy a long and successful association with the band which included production of their albums Green (1988), Out of Time (1991), Automatic for the People (1992), Monster (1994) and New Adventures in Hi-Fi (1996). In 1997, R.E.M. and Litt discontinued their collaboration.

Apart from R.E.M., the most commercially successful act Litt worked with was Nirvana, for whom he mixed the singles "Heart-Shaped Box" and "All Apologies" from the 1993 album In Utero, and the posthumous release MTV Unplugged in New York (1994). Litt also remixed "Pennyroyal Tea" and the remix was set to be released on the single, but the single was retracted shortly after Kurt Cobain's death. His remix can be found on Wal-Mart and Kmart versions of In Utero as well as Nirvana, Nirvana's greatest hits collection. In 1999 and the 2000s, Litt worked with Incubus to produce two of their records Make Yourself (1999) and Morning View (2001). Litt also mixed songs for Hole including "Miss World", "Asking For It", "Jennifer's Body", and "Softer, Softest" off their album Live Through This.

He has also worked for Liz Phair, Juliana Hatfield, the Indigo Girls, Paul Kelly, New Order, The Replacements, Patti Smith (Dream of Life), The Woodentops (Wooden Foot Cops on the Highway), That Petrol Emotion (Chemicrazy), Counting Crows, Days of the New, The Get Up Kids, Ziggy Marley and Alela Diane.

Litt also started his own label, Outpost Recordings, initially in partnership with IRS Records employee Mark Williams, and funded and distributed by Geffen Records.
