= In View: The Best of R.E.M. 1988–2003 =

Video by R.E.M.
- Released: October 27, 2003
- Recorded: Various
- Genre: Alternative rock
- Label: Warner Reprise Video

R.E.M. chronology
In Time: The Best of R.E.M. 1988–2003 (2003)	In View: The Best of R.E.M. 1988–2003 (2003)	Perfect Square (2004)

R.E.M. video chronology
Road Movie (1996)	In View: The Best of R.E.M. 1988–2003 (2003)	Perfect Square (2004)

In View: The Best of R.E.M. 1988–2003 is a DVD featuring videos by the rock band R.E.M. from 1988 to 2003, released as a companion to the Warner Bros. compilation In Time: The Best of R.E.M. 1988-2003. All but two of the songs included on the audio CD made the DVD—the exceptions being "All the Right Friends" (which had no official music video) and "Animal" (the video for which was not shot until early 2004).

== Audio ==
- Dolby Digital Stereo
- Dolby Digital 5.1
- DTS 5.1

== Video listing ==
All songs written by Bill Berry, Peter Buck, Mike Mills and Michael Stipe except as indicated. Directors in parentheses.

1. "Bad Day" (Tim Hope) – 4:01
2. "All the Way to Reno (You're Gonna Be a Star)" (Buck, Mills, Stipe) (Michael Moore) – 4:25
3. "Imitation of Life" (Buck, Mills, Stipe) (Garth Jennings) – 3:56
4. "The Great Beyond" (Buck, Mills, Stipe) (Liz Friedlander) – 5:04
5. "At My Most Beautiful" (Buck, Mills, Stipe) (Nigel Dick) – 3:35
6. "Daysleeper" (Buck, Mills, Stipe) (The Snorri Brothers) – 3:39
7. "Electrolite" (Peter Care & Spike Jonze) – 4:08
8. "E-Bow the Letter" (feat. Patti Smith) (Jem Cohen) – 5:23
9. "What's the Frequency, Kenneth?" (Peter Care) – 4:01
10. "Nightswimming" (Jem Cohen) – 4:17
11. "The Sidewinder Sleeps Tonite" (Kevin Kerslake) – 4:07
12. "Everybody Hurts" (Jake Scott) – 5:37
13. "Man on the Moon" (Peter Care) – 5:12
14. "Losing My Religion" (Tarsem Singh) – 4:26
15. "Stand" (Katherine Diekmann) – 3:14
16. "Orange Crush" (Matt Mahurin) – 3:51

=== Bonus videos ===
1. "Tongue" (Jonathan Dayton & Valerie Faris) – 4:07
2. "How the West Was Won and Where It Got Us" (Lance Bangs) – 4:57
3. "New Test Leper" (Lance Bangs & Dominic DeJoseph) – 5:30
4. "Bittersweet Me" (Dominic DeJoseph) – 4:48
5. "Lotus" (Buck, Mills, Stipe) (Stéphane Sednaoui) – 4:35
6. "I'll Take the Rain" (Buck, Mills, Stipe) (David Weir) – 4:38

=== Live footage ===
Recorded at Trafalgar Square on April 29, 2001:

1. "Imitation of Life" (Buck, Mills, Stipe)
2. "Losing My Religion"
3. "Man on the Moon"

== Certifications ==
Region	Certification	Certified units/sales
Australia (ARIA)	Gold	7,500^{^}
United Kingdom (BPI)	Platinum	50,000^{*}
^{*} Sales figures based on certification alone.^{^} Shipments figures based on certification alone.
