= Up (R.E.M. album) =

Album by R.E.M.

- Original cover art. The 25th anniversary release opts for a maroon and pink color scheme.

Studio album by R.E.M.
- Released: October 26, 1998
- Studios: La Casa del Elefante (Seattle); Toast (San Francisco); John Keane (Athens)
- Genres: Alternative rock; electronic; lounge pop
- Length: 64:31
- Label: Warner Bros.
- Producers: Pat McCarthy; R.E.M.

R.E.M. chronology
R.E.M.: In the Attic – Alternative Recordings 1985–1989 (1997)	Up (1998)	Man on the Moon (1999)

Singles from Up
- 1. "Daysleeper" Released: October 12, 1998; 2. "Lotus" Released: December 7, 1998; 3. "At My Most Beautiful" Released: March 8, 1999; 4. "Suspicion" Released: June 28, 1999

Up is the eleventh studio album by American rock band R.E.M. It was released on October 26, 1998, through Warner Bros. Records. The album was the band's first without drummer and founding member Bill Berry, who retired from the band in October 1997. In his place, R.E.M. used session drummers such as Joey Waronker and Barrett Martin while also utilizing drum machines. The album was produced by Pat McCarthy, making it R.E.M.'s first album since Lifes Rich Pageant (1986) not to be produced by Scott Litt.

The songs on Up display a much larger electronic music influence than previous R.E.M. material, with extensive use of keyboards and drum programming. Among the ideas Stipe set out to explore lyrically were what he described as the "religious-spiritual versus science-technology-modern-age", in addition to an "automatic, unconscious" style. The making of the album was tumultuous, with the band later admitting to coming close to breaking up during the process.

While Up was commercially successful, reaching the top 3 in both the US and UK, its sales fell short of R.E.M.'s previous albums. Four singles were released from the album: "Daysleeper", "Lotus", "At My Most Beautiful" and "Suspicion". Both "Daysleeper" and "At My Most Beautiful" were top 10 hits in the UK, while the former reached the top of the US Adult Alternative Songs chart. Critical reception has been positive, with many considering it to be a transitional record for the band and praising its integration of electronic elements. The band toured throughout 1999 in Europe and the US in promotion of the album. In 2023, Up was reissued with bonus material for the 25th anniversary of its release.

== Background ==
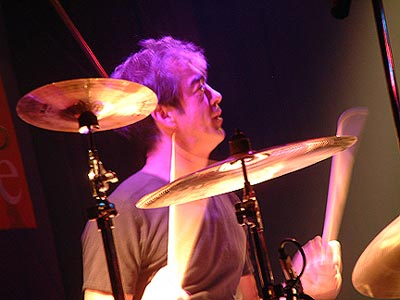
Up was R.E.M.'s first album without drummer Bill Berry.

In 1995, R.E.M. embarked on a tour for their ninth studio album Monster (1994), their first since the Green (1988) tour. While the tour was critically and commercially successful, the band was marred by health problems, including an aneurysm suffered by Berry at a show in Lausanne, Switzerland. After receiving emergency surgery, Berry made a full recovery, although the band had to cancel the rest of their spring tour. Bassist Mike Mills additionally had to have an intestinal tumor removed in July of that year, whilst in August lead vocalist Michael Stipe suffered a hernia. The next year, the band signed a deal with Warner Bros. Records worth an estimated $80 million, which had been regarded as the largest recording contract awarded up to that point. In the spring, the band parted ways with longtime manager Jefferson Holt due to allegations of sexual harassment. In September 1996, the band released New Adventures in Hi-Fi, which had been partially recorded live and during soundchecks from the Monster tour. The album was a critical and commercial success, reaching number two in the US and number one in the UK. However, none of its singles managed to reach the top 40 in the US and sales were lower than the band's previous few releases.

== Recording ==
R.E.M. began rehearsals for their next album in February 1997 at West Clayton Street in Athens. The band produced around 20 backing tracks at this time, and after these sessions they considered working with Litt once again. However, Litt was in the process of founding a record label at the time and was not as interested in producing records as before. Later in March, the band continued work in Buck's home studio in Hawaii, intending to build songs around the backing tracks created in February. While these sessions preceded Berry's departure, the band had already moved in a more electronic direction, with the tracks utilizing drum machines and being written with very little guitar; at this point the band had put "about 40 songs on tape." However, due to various personal factors, Berry struggled to remain interested in working with the band, and when they reconvened to continue work on Up in October 1997, he announced his departure. While the band had, in the past, declared they would disband following the departure of any members, Berry made it clear to the rest of R.E.M. that he would not leave if it would result in the dissolution of the band. The band continued and decided against replacing Berry, instead utilizing session drummers and drum machines. However, sessions booked at John Keane's studio in October and November were cancelled, as the band were unsure of their direction and "couldn't rehearse without a drummer."

The band's first sessions without Berry began on February 2, 1998 at Toast Studios in San Francisco. In Litt's place was producer Pat McCarthy, who had previously worked with R.E.M. as an engineer and had also worked with acts including U2 and Counting Crows. "Airportman" was one of the first songs to be finished, being "written, recorded, sung, and mixed by us all in one day", according to Stipe. Despite a fast start, progress was quickly halted by Stipe's writer's block.

== Music and lyrics ==
Considered both an alternative rock and electronic record, Up is largely defined by the use of drum machines and keyboards, to a greater extent than on any previous R.E.M. album. Stipe cited "the religious-spiritual versus science-technology-modern-age" as a theme he intended to explore with his lyrics. He also sought an "automatic, unconscious" style inspired by Patti Smith. According to Stipe, Bertis Downs, the band's lawyer, noted a theme of "people falling down and getting back up again".

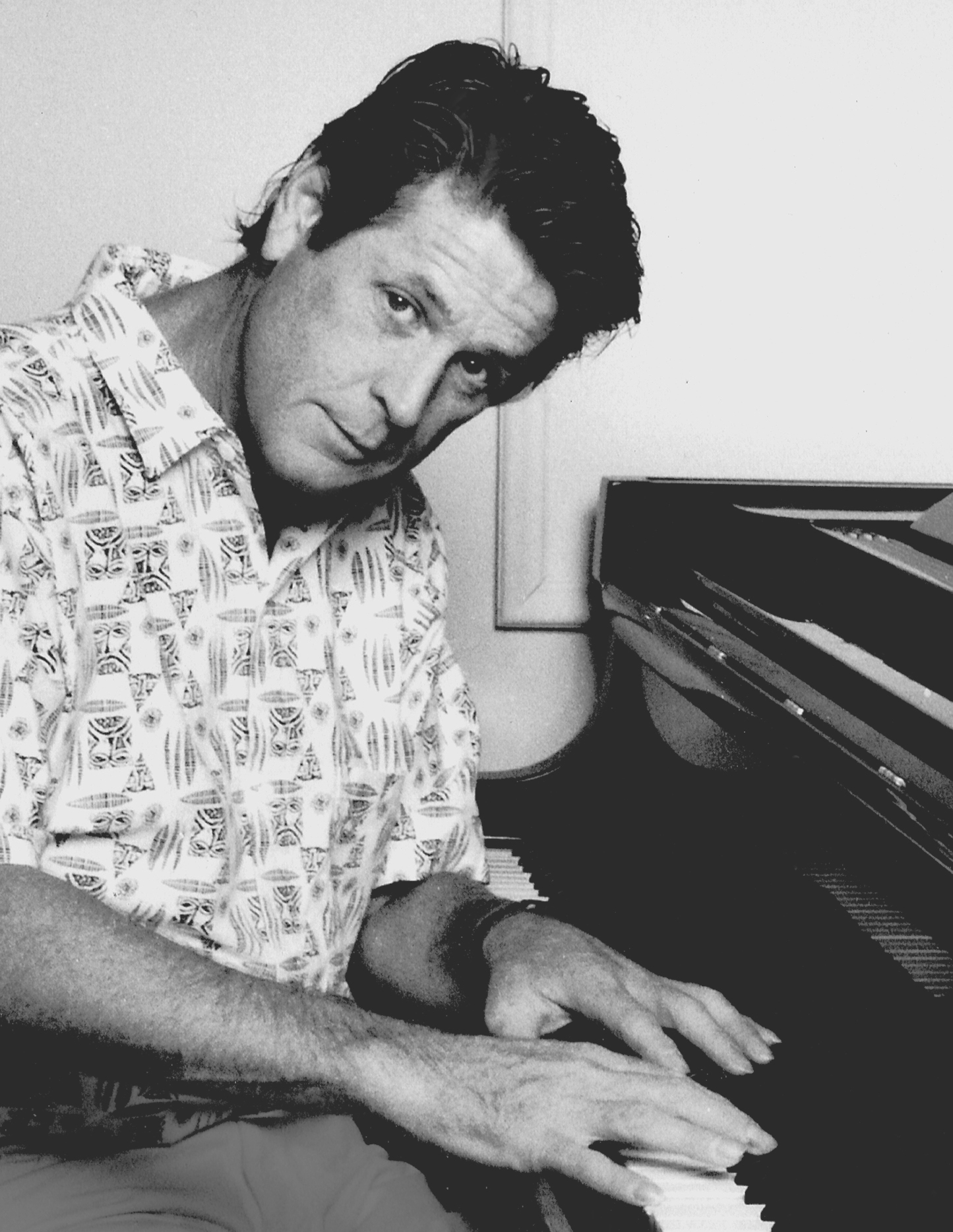
Many tracks on Up have been compared to the work of Brian Wilson, particularly the Beach Boys' album Pet Sounds (1966).

The album opens with "Airportman", which Mills states was specifically chosen as the first track as "a challenge to the audience". He felt the song would effectively introduce "the new R.E.M.", while also stating that "if [the listener] can get on board with this song starting the record, then you can get on board with everything else." Lyrically, the song takes the perspective of a travelling businessman. Its music has been compared to the work of Brian Eno and OMD, while Stipe's vocals have been likened to Thom Yorke. "Lotus" was written by Buck on keyboards, and is one of the few on the album to feature live drumming. In reviewing the album's 25th anniversary reissue for Pitchfork, Stephen Thomas Erlewine declared it to be Up's "hardest rocking cut". "Suspicion" has been described by Ryan Leas of Stereogum as a "strange electronic meditation" and "a whisper of a Bond theme in some kind of space lounge". Despite not participating in the writing of the song, singer-songwriter Leonard Cohen was given a writing credit for "Hope" due to its perceived similarities to Cohen's song "Suzanne". Erlewine states the song "hums along to an understatedly urgent pulse", while Leas interprets its lyrics as "grappling with technology and faith".

The baroque-esque "At My Most Beautiful" has received many comparisons to the Beach Boys, particularly the band's 1966 album Pet Sounds. Often considered the band's first true love song, it was deliberately arranged by Mills to be a tribute to the Beach Boys. The writing of the song was spurred by Stipe coming up with the lyric "I found a way to make you smile" while sitting in traffic. The song's drums are performed by Buck, who has also cited the song as having his favorite of Mills' basslines. Seth Troyer of PopMatters compares the guitar work on "The Apologist" to that of the band's 1994 album Monster, while referring to its lyrics as a "character study" echoing the chorus of an earlier R.E.M. song, "So. Central Rain (I'm Sorry)" (1984). Sal Cineuqmani of Slant describes "Sad Professor" as a "character study of an aging, self-loathing alcoholic." "Walk Unafraid" has been called a "deconstructed rocker", with the verses "suspended in midair" while also having "one of the only affirming choruses" on the album. The song's lyrics were inspired by a conversation Stipe had with Patti Smith in which she encouraged him to be "fearless" in working on the album; Stipe made a point of making the lyrical themes broader, stating that "I wanted ['Walk Unafraid'] to be more universal than just me having to embark on the writing of an album. That's a little too specific and not that interesting, so I wrote this song." Much like "At My Most Beautiful", Leas compares "Why Not Smile" to Pet Sounds–era Beach Boys, while Troyer states the track "begins as a simple acoustic song and explodes into a borderline shoegaze, noise guitar jam."

The lyrics of "Daysleeper" are generally more direct in comparison to other tracks on the album, sung from the perspective of a nightshift worker whose lifestyle causes them to feel isolated and depressed. Stipe was inspired to write the song after seeing a "daysleeper" sign in a New York apartment building. Troyer considers "Daysleeper" to be one of the most conventional songs on the album, saying it "chime[s] forth with a catchy pop-rock style that [feels] more like classic R.E.M." Tim Peacock of uDiscover Music cites "Diminished" and "Parakeet" as examples of the album's use of experimental instrumentation, with the former including "embellishments of vibes and tabla" and the latter utilizing "Pet Sounds-era organs." Additionally, "Diminished" includes a short hidden track entitled "I'm Not Over You". "Falls to Climb", the album's closing track, features a vocal performance by Stipe which has earned comparisons to Radiohead's "How to Disappear Completely", released on their album Kid A two years after the release of Up. Troyer describes the song as "a beautiful epilogue" which is "full of tragic acceptance".

== Release and commercial performance ==
Breaking with a tradition that stretched back to the band's 1983 debut, Murmur, Stipe elected to have his complete lyrics included in Up's CD booklet, a practice he would maintain on all subsequent R.E.M. studio albums. "[Mike Mills] was reading the lyrics," he explained, "and he said, 'These are really great – we should print them on the record sleeve.' It was a really good night and there were eight or nine songs on the wall. I said, 'Yeah, we will'… I thought it was a nice way of saying that we are a different band now."

I try not to expect anything from sales, because if you judge the quality of a record from sales, then you're bound to lose your way as an artist... You can't make people like it or buy it. We're very happy with this record. I think we did a really good job. If it turns out to not be phenomenally successfully [sic], that's not a problem.

— Mike Mills

Warner Bros. chose "Daysleeper" as the album's first single, which was released on October 12, 1998. The band was unhappy with the decision to release the song as the album's lead single, as they felt it was not necessarily indicative of the rest of the album. It peaked at number 57 on the Billboard Hot 100, making it their lowest-charting lead single since "Fall on Me" in 1986. However, it was more successful on the Adult Alternative Songs chart, where it stayed at the top for two weeks. The song was more successful in the UK, where it reached number six. "Lotus", the album's second single, was less successful, peaking at number 4 on the US Adult Alternative Songs chart and number 26 on the UK Singles Chart. The album's third single, "At My Most Beautiful" was more successful, becoming its second top 10 hit in the UK, where it peaked at number ten. "Suspicion" was released as the album's fourth and final single and failed to chart in either territory.

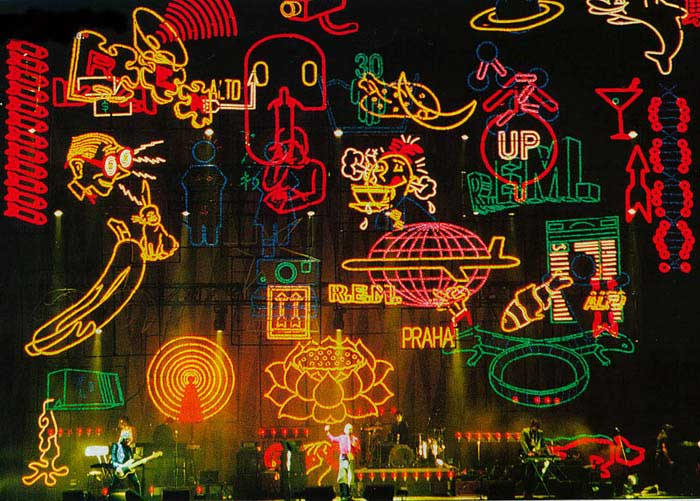
R.E.M. touring for Up in 1999

The album itself was released on October 26, 1998. Despite debuting at number three on the US Billboard 200 and selling 117,000 copies in its first week of release, its sales dropped in the following weeks. The album would be certified Gold by the RIAA on January 22, 1999, becoming their first studio album since Lifes Rich Pageant to not receive a Platinum certification. However, Up saw more success in Europe, with it topping the charts in Italy, Germany, Austria, and Norway and placing at number two in the UK, Ireland, and Sweden. Sales were high in Italy in particular, exceeding 90,000 copies in its first week of release. The band members were not disappointed in the album's sales in the US; as Buck stated: "I'm not unsatisfied [about the American sales figures]... I'd like to sell more. But there's not much I can really do about it. I think we made a great record. We're doing television and press [to promote it]."

A 25th-anniversary edition was released on November 10, 2023. This reissue included a second disc with the band's February 1999 live performance for the sitcom Party of Five alongside a DVD with music videos and other material.

== Critical reception ==
Professional ratings
Review scores
Source	Rating
AllMusic	2.5/5 stars
Blender	4/5 stars
Entertainment Weekly	A−
The Guardian	3/5 stars
Los Angeles Times	3.5/4 stars
NME	7/10
Pitchfork	6.1/10 (1998); 6.9/10 (2023)
Q	4/5 stars
Rolling Stone	4/5 stars
Spin	8/10

Upon release, Up received generally positive reviews from critics. Writing for the Los Angeles Times, Mike Boehm found the album to be an improvement from New Adventures in Hi-Fi, praising its "resourceful and cohesive soundscape" and its "passionate take on end-of-the-century malaise". Boehm noted a lyrical theme of "sort[ing] through confusion and reach[ing] uncertainly for clarity", while he described its music as "muted pop-baroque." Boehm highlighted Stipe's vocals on "At My Most Beautiful" and the album's "two rockers" ("Lotus" and "Walk Unafraid"), while likening "Hope" to "Kraftwerk covering Leonard Cohen's 'Suzanne'". Entertainment Weekly's David Browne deemed Up R.E.M.'s most cohesive album since Automatic for the People (1992) and said that their shift toward "mid-tempo, or often no-tempo, hymns and ballads" suited them, accentuating the vulnerability "at the heart" of the band's work. In a four-star review for Q, Danny Eccleston felt the album would be challenging for casual listeners, but more accessible for fans of the band: "It will certainly sound strange to those who only own Automatic for the People and repeat-play the hits. Conversely, anyone who has a healthy number of R.E.M. records – let's say four – and plays them regularly, should manage to listen to Up without his head exploding or tossing herself off a tall building or any of the weird things people are meant to do when faced with music they don't quite understand." He went on to state that while there was a "fear that R.E.M. playing keyboards would sound like old dogs trying embarrassing new tricks", they instead "sound comfortable with the instrumentation and are pushing the capabilities of it from the off."

Writing for Rolling Stone, Ann Powers compared the album to Radiohead's OK Computer (1997), highlighting a shared theme of "alienation" and stating that "Buck and Mills cultivate the same multitiered spaciousness [on Up] that makes OK Computer so rich." Powers went on to describe Up as "a look back and a dream forward from the greatest rock-ballad band that ever existed, a group whose fast songs even made you think slow, the one that made introspection not just a sideline but the whole game." Sally Jacob of Spin felt that the album's electronic style helped keep R.E.M.'s sound fresh and compared it to the band's debut Murmur (1983). Jacob went on to praise Up as "lushly arranged" and "float[ing] away from R.E.M.'s past moorings in weighty, enigmatic symbolism." Conversely, Pitchfork's original review of the album was more mixed, feeling that the band's change in sound was "contrived and forced." While reviewer Duane Ambroz highlighted "Airportman", "Why Not Smile", and "Daysleeper" as instances where the album was successful, he considered "At My Most Beautiful" to be "laughable" and found the album as a whole to be "dull and tired". In The Guardian, Adam Sweeting credited R.E.M. for diversifying their sound on Up but found their musical experimentation only intermittently successful, summarizing the album as sounding like "it's suffering an identity crisis."

Retrospective reviews of the album have also been positive, with many considering it to be underrated. Writing for AllMusic, Stephen Thomas Erlewine called the album "accomplished and varied", while also noting that the record proved how R.E.M. could integrate a wide array of genres into their sound while maintaining their identity. However, he also felt that "for the first time, R.E.M. sound like they're playing catch-up, trying to keep their hip status intact." Rating the album as part of a 2005 group of reissues, Karen Schoemer of Blender awarded Up four stars out of five, calling it the band's "most intimate [album] in years." Louis Pattison of Uncut noted the group's embracement of electronica and the aesthetics of hypermodernity, with a dislocated, 'fin de siècle' feel comparable to Radiohead's OK Computer and Kid A (2000), with Thom Yorke of that band citing Up as a touchstone for the latter album. Pattison added that Up's use of electronics was prescient, as "post-Kid A, groups like The Postal Service and Owl City would work so-called 'emotronica' into a commercial force. But in 1998, the audience were not ready, and R.E.M. themselves proved either unwilling or unable."

The album's 25th anniversary reissue sparked renewed attention in the album and further positive reviews.

Although R.E.M. initially intended not to tour for the album, after many successful promotional concerts upon the album's release, the band quickly arranged a four-month arena tour of Europe and America during the summer of 1999. As of March 2007, Up has sold 664,000 units in the U.S.

=== Accolades ===
In 1999, Nude as the News ranked the album at number 74 in its list of "The 100 Most Compelling Albums of the Decade". That same year, Australian magazine Juice ranked it at number 38 in its list of the "100 Greatest Albums of the '90s". In 2005, journalist Jude Rogers included the album in The Word's list "Hidden Treasure: Great Underrated Albums of Our Time", whose inductions were chosen by celebrities. It also appeared in at least 22 magazine lists of the greatest albums of 1998.

== Track listing ==
All songs by Peter Buck, Mike Mills and Michael Stipe, except where noted.

Original release

Upside

1. "Airportman" – 4:12
2. "Lotus" – 4:30
3. "Suspicion" – 5:36
4. "Hope" (Buck, Mills, Stipe, Leonard Cohen) (Note: Leonard Cohen was not directly involved in the writing of "Hope" but was given a writing credit by the band due to similarities in melody and lyrical pattern to his song "Suzanne".) – 5:02
5. "At My Most Beautiful" – 3:35
6. "The Apologist" – 4:30
7. "Sad Professor" – 4:01
8. "You're in the Air" – 5:22

Downside

9. "Walk Unafraid" – 4:31
10. "Why Not Smile" – 4:03
11. "Daysleeper" – 3:40
12. "Diminished" – 6:01
  - "I'm Not Over You" (hidden track) (Note: On digital releases, the track is listed as "Diminished / I'm Not Over You - Medley".)
13. "Parakeet" – 4:09
14. "Falls to Climb" – 5:06

Notes

- Similarly to New Adventures in Hi-Fi, the vinyl release of Up is split over two records and so does not have custom side titles. The sides listed here refer to the cassette release.

== B-sides ==
B-sides to Up singles
Title	Single
"Emphysema"	"Daysleeper"
"Sad Professor" (live in the studio)	"Daysleeper"
"Why Not Smile" (Oxford American version)	"Daysleeper"
"Surfing the Ganges"	"Lotus"
"Suspicion" (live in the studio)	"Lotus"
"Lotus" (weird mix)	"Lotus"
"The Passenger" (live on Later… with Jools Holland)	"At My Most Beautiful"
"Country Feedback" (live on Later… with Jools Holland)	"At My Most Beautiful"
So. Central Rain (I'm Sorry) (live on Later… with Jools Holland)	"At My Most Beautiful"
"Electrolite" (live on Later… with Jools Holland)	"Suspicion"
"Man on the Moon" (live on Later… with Jools Holland)	"Suspicion"
"Perfect Circle" (live on Later… with Jools Holland)	"Suspicion"

== Personnel ==
Personnel taken from Up liner notes.

R.E.M.

- Peter Buck
- Mike Mills
- Michael Stipe

Additional musicians

- Barrett Martin
- Scott McCaughey
- Joey Waronker
- John Keane
- Bruce Kaphan

Strings

- Paul Murphy – viola, leader
- Jere Flint – conductor
- Jun-Chin Ling, David Arenz, David Braitberg, Willard Shull, Sou-Chun Su, Ellie Arenz, Jay Christy, Anne Page, Helen Porter – violin
- Reid Harris, Heidi Nitchie, Patti Gouvas – viola
- Daniel Laufer, Elizabeth Murphy, Christopher Rex, Nan Maddox – cello
- Douglas Sommer – double bass
- Eddie Horst – string arrangements on "Suspicion" and "You're in the Air"
- John Sharpley – string arrangements on "Lotus"

Technical personnel

- Pat McCarthy – production, mixing (1, 3, 7, 8, 10)
- R.E.M. – production, mixing (1, 3, 7, 8, 10), string arrangements on "Suspicion" and "You're in the Air"
  - Peter Buck – engineer (Seattle)
- Charlie Francis – engineer (San Francisco)
- John Keane – engineer (Athens), mix engineer (1, 7, 10)
- John Hopkins – additional recording engineer (New York)
- Jamie Candiloro – additional recording engineer (New York)
- Robert Shimp – second engineer (San Francisco)
- David Henry – second engineer (Athens)
- Rob Haddock – second engineer (Athens)
- Craig Silvey – digital editing (San Francisco)
- Steve Holsworth – digital editing (San Francisco)
- Nigel Godrich – mixing (2, 4, 6, 9, 11, 13, 14)
- John Hanlon – mixing (5, 12)
- Suzanne Dyer – second mix engineer (2, 4, 6, 9, 11, 13, 14)

== Charts ==
=== Weekly charts ===
Weekly chart performance for Up
Chart (1998)	Peak position
Australian ARIA Albums Chart	5
Austrian Albums Chart	1
Belgian Albums Chart (Flanders)	4
Belgian Albums Chart (Wallonia)	25
Canadian RPM Albums Chart	2
Dutch Albums Chart	16
Finnish Albums Chart	10
French SNEP Albums Chart	9
German Media Control Albums Chart	1
Hungarian Albums Chart	35
Japanese Oricon Albums Chart	47
New Zealand Albums Chart	8
Norwegian VG-lista Albums Chart	1
Scottish Albums	2
Spanish Albums Chart	17
Swedish Albums Chart	2
Swiss Albums Chart	7
UK Albums Chart	2
U.S. Billboard 200	3

=== Year-end charts ===
Weekly chart performance for Up
Chart (1998)	Position
Austrian Albums Chart	45
Belgian Albums Chart (Flanders)	38
Dutch Albums Chart	99
German Albums Chart	74
UK Albums Chart	59

== Certifications and sales ==
Certifications and sales for Up
Region	Certification	Certified units/sales
Australia (ARIA)	Gold	35,000^{^}
Austria (IFPI Austria)	Gold	25,000^{*}
Belgium (BRMA)	Gold	25,000^{*}
France (SNEP)	Gold	100,000^{*}
Italy	—	150,000
New Zealand (RMNZ)	Gold	7,500^{^}
Norway (IFPI Norway)	Platinum	50,000^{*}
Spain (Promusicae)	Gold	50,000^{^}
Sweden (GLF)	Gold	40,000^{^}
Switzerland (IFPI Switzerland)	Gold	25,000^{^}
United Kingdom (BPI)	Platinum	300,000^{^}
United States (RIAA)	Gold	664,000
Summaries
Europe (IFPI)	Platinum	1,000,000^{*}
Worldwide Oct. - Dec. 1998 sales	—	1,500,000
^{*} Sales figures based on certification alone.^{^} Shipments figures based on certification alone.

== Sources ==
- Black, Johnny (2004). Reveal: The Story of R.E.M. Backbeat. ISBN 0-87930-776-5.
