= Suspicion (R.E.M. song) =

Song by R.E.M

Single by R.E.M.

from the album Up
- B-side: "Perfect Circle" (as performed on BBC's Later with Jools Holland)
- Released: June 28, 1999
- Genre: Chamber pop
- Length: 5:36 (album version); 4:33 (radio edit)
- Label: Warner Bros.
- Songwriter(s): Michael Stipe, Peter Buck, Mike Mills
- Producer(s): Pat McCarthy and R.E.M.

R.E.M. singles chronology
"At My Most Beautiful" (1999)	"Suspicion" (1999)	"The Great Beyond" (2000)

"Suspicion" is the fourth and final single released from American rock band R.E.M.'s from their 11th studio album, Up (1998). Unlike previous singles from Up, "Suspicion" was the only single from the album not to chart.

A live version of the song, recorded at Toast Studios in San Francisco, 1998, was released as a B-side to the second single from Up, "Lotus", released the following year and peaked at number 26 on the UK Singles Chart. This version was included in the German releases of the CD.

== Track listings ==
UK CD single 1

1. "Suspicion" (Album Version)
2. "Electrolite" (Live)
3. "Man on the Moon" (Live)
- Tracks two and three were recorded live on Later with Jools Holland

UK 3-inch CD single

1. "Suspicion" (Live from Ealing Studios)
2. "Perfect Circle" (Live)
- Track two was recorded live on Later with Jools Holland
