= New Adventures in Hi-Fi =

1996 R.E.M. album

- Cover to the standard edition of the album.

Studio album by R.E.M.
- Released: September 9, 1996
- Recorded: 1995–1996
- Venue: Various locations in the United States
- Studio: Bad Animals (Seattle)
- Genres: Folk rock; jangle pop
- Length: 65:33
- Label: Warner Bros.
- Producers: Scott Litt; R.E.M.

R.E.M. chronology
Parallel (1995)	New Adventures in Hi-Fi (1996)	Road Movie (1996)

Singles from New Adventures in Hi-Fi
- 1. "E-Bow the Letter" Released: August 19, 1996; 2. "Bittersweet Me" Released: October 21, 1996; 3. "Electrolite" Released: December 2, 1996; 4. "How the West Was Won and Where It Got Us" Released: 1997

Special Edition
- Special edition of the album—a cardboard slipcase covers a 64-page hardback book

New Adventures in Hi-Fi is the tenth studio album by the American alternative rock band R.E.M. It was their fifth major-label release for Warner Bros. Records, released on September 9, 1996, in Europe and Australia, and the following day in the United States. New Adventures in Hi-Fi was the band's final album recorded with founding drummer Bill Berry (who left the band amicably the following year), original manager Jefferson Holt, and longtime producer Scott Litt.

The members of R.E.M. consider the recorded album representative of the band at their peak, and fans generally regard it as the band's last great record before a perceived artistic decline following Berry's departure. It has sold around seven million units, and has grown in cult status in the years after its release, with several retrospectives ranking it among the band's best work.

== Composition and recording ==
New Adventures in Hi-Fi was recorded during and after the band's 1995 tour in support of Monster. The material on the album mixed the acoustic country rock feel of Out of Time and Automatic for the People with the rock sound of Monster and Lifes Rich Pageant. The band cited Neil Young's 1973 album Time Fades Away as a source of inspiration. The album has been labeled as "folk rock-jangle" by critic Robert Christgau.

In an interview with Mojo, bassist Mike Mills said:

We got into the studio feeling very happy and relieved that everyone was okay, especially Bill. It brought us all much closer and made us realize how important we are to each other. Once we'd been through a crisis like that [Berry's collapse from a brain aneurysm on tour], making a record was a piece of cake. We discussed making an album of on-the-road stuff a year and a half before we went on the Monster tour. We wanted to get some of the looseness and spontaneity of a soundcheck, live show or dressing room. We used all the good songs. 'Revolution' – a song we did live – didn't make it onto this record, just like it didn't make it onto Monster [the song instead appeared on 1997's Batman & Robin soundtrack]... It usually takes a good few years for me to decide where an album stands in the pantheon of recorded work we've done. This one may be third behind Murmur and Automatic for the People.

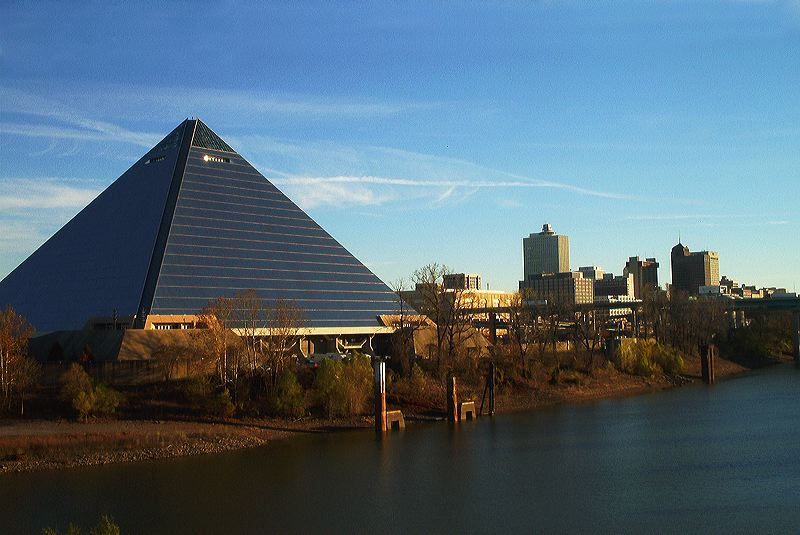
Memphis, Tennessee's Pyramid Arena was one of several locations used to record New Adventures in Hi-Fi

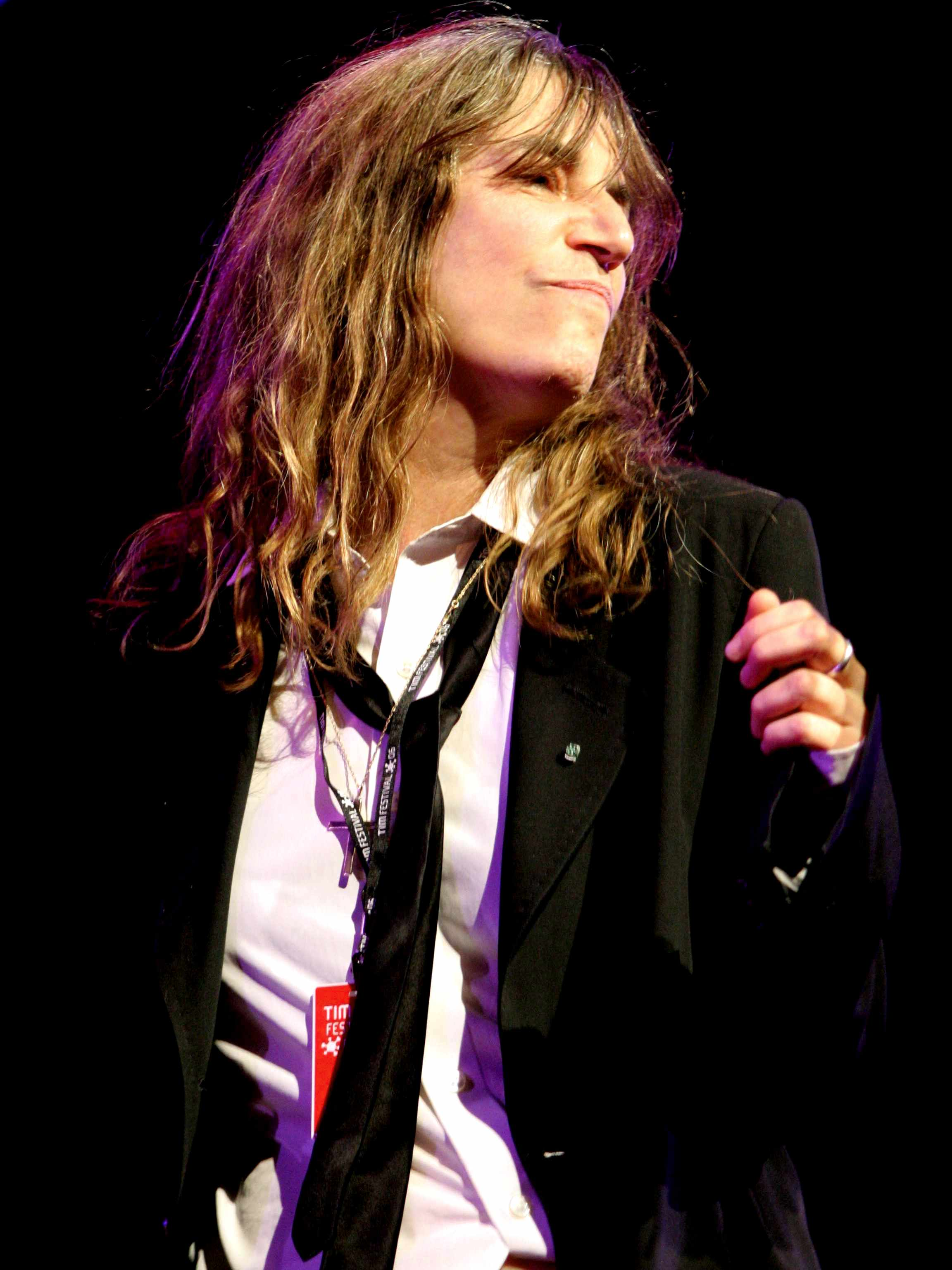
Patti Smith—an influence on Peter Buck and Michael Stipe—added vocals to lead single "E-Bow the Letter"

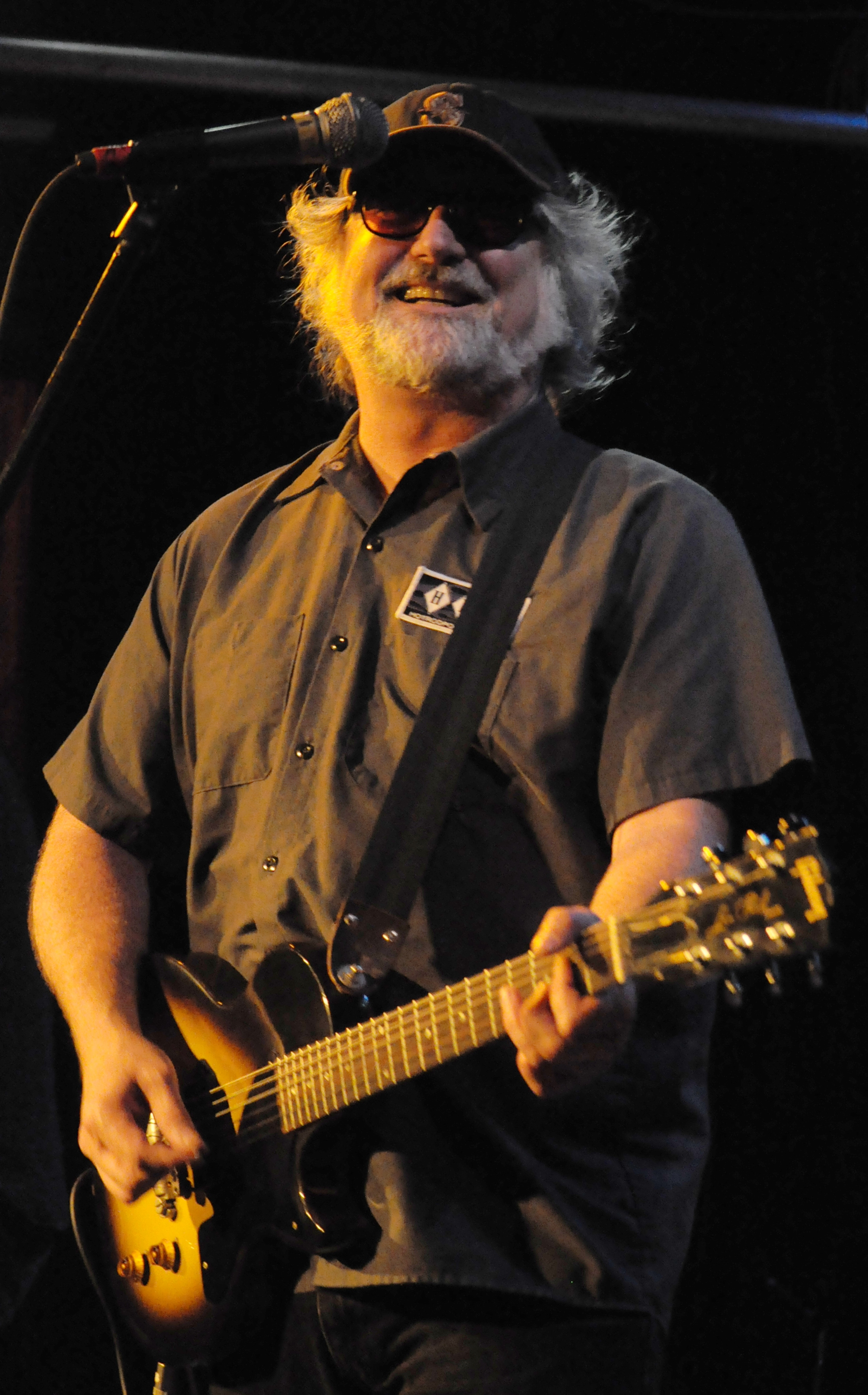
New Adventures in Hi-Fi represented the beginning of R.E.M.'s long-time association with Seattle-based multi-instrumentalist Scott McCaughey (pictured here in 2011)

The band noted that they borrowed the recording process for the album from Radiohead, who had recorded some of the basic tracks for The Bends while on tour and who supported the band in 1994 and 1995. R.E.M. took eight-track recorders to capture their live performances, and used the recordings as the base elements for the album. As such, the band's touring musicians Nathan December and Scott McCaughey are featured throughout, with Andy Carlson contributing violin to "Electrolite".

After the tour was over, the band went into Seattle's Bad Animals Studio and recorded four additional tracks: "How the West Was Won and Where It Got Us", "E-Bow the Letter", "Be Mine", and "New Test Leper". Patti Smith contributed vocals on "E-Bow the Letter". Mixing was finished at John Keane Studio in Athens and Louie's Clubhouse in Los Angeles, with mastering undertaken by Bob Ludwig at Gateway Mastering in Portland, Maine.

In part due to the nature of the recording process, several of the songs are about travel and motion, including "Departure", "Leave" and "Low Desert". The album's liner notes contain pictures from the road and the deluxe edition of the album is a hardcover book in a slipcase featuring more photographs of the tour.

== Artwork ==
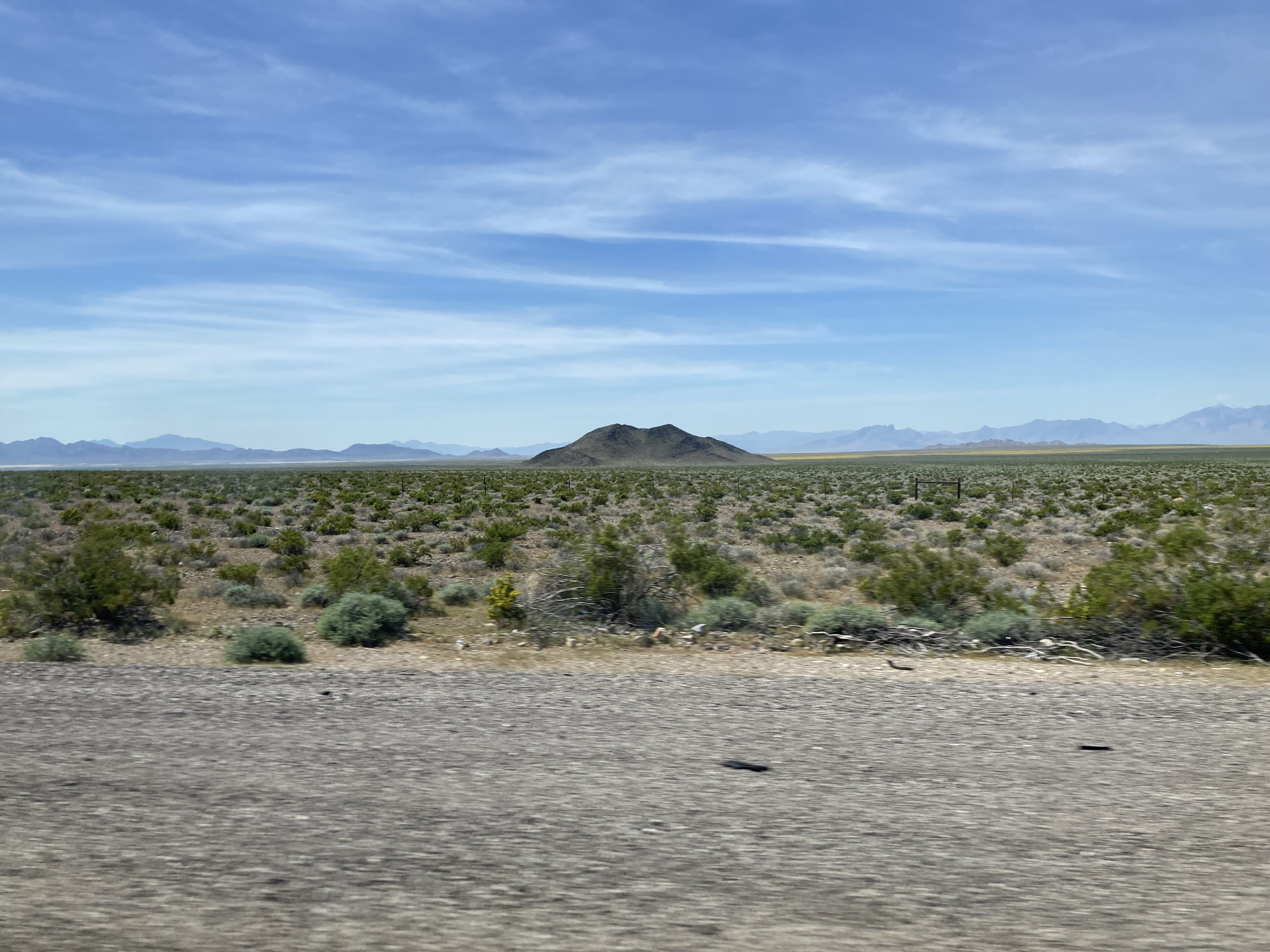
The album's cover shot was taken from U.S. Route 95 in Nevada, between Mercury and Amargosa Valley.

The photograph used on the album cover was shot by Stipe along U.S. Route 95 in Nevada during a road trip to Georgia from Los Angeles. Other parts of the packaging were done by Chris Bilheimer.

== Critical reception ==
Professional ratings
Review scores
Source	Rating
AllMusic	4/5 stars
Christgau's Consumer Guide	A−
Entertainment Weekly	A
The Guardian	3/5 stars
Los Angeles Times	4/4 stars
NME	8/10
Pitchfork	9.5/10
Q	5/5 stars
Rolling Stone	4.5/5 stars
Spin	6/10

Contemporary critical reaction to the album was mostly positive. Several publications lauded the album for its diversity, including Rolling Stone, which said that "The sequence of songs and the range of emotions on New Adventures convey a narrative that has all the dynamics and contradictions of life itself." Q and Mojo also gave positive reviews. At the same time, Melody Maker criticized the album's sound, which it attributed to the use of recordings from soundchecks and live performances.

Stephen Thomas Erlewine of AllMusic said that "New Adventures in Hi-Fi feels like it was recorded on the road. Not only are all of Michael Stipe's lyrics on the album about moving or travel, the sound is ragged and varied, pieced together from tapes recorded at shows, soundtracks, and studios, giving it a loose, careening charm." He considered it "one of [the band's] best records of the '90s." In a 2017 retrospective, Consequence of Sound ranked it third out of R.E.M.'s fifteen studio albums.

New Adventures in Hi-Fi is frontman Michael Stipe's favorite R.E.M. album, and he considers it the band at their peak. Radiohead singer Thom Yorke, who has cited R.E.M. as a major influence, called it his favorite R.E.M. album and "Electrolite" the band's greatest song. Jeremy Bifras of BrooklynVegan called the album "an experimental masterpiece".

=== Awards ===
New Adventures in Hi-Fi has since appeared on several lists compiling the best albums of the 1990s or all time: Magnet listed the album at No. 20 on its list of the "Top 60 Albums 1993–2003", and Mojo also listed the album at No. 20 on a list of "The 100 Greatest Albums of Our Lifetime 1993–2006".

It was voted No. 186 in Colin Larkin's All Time Top 1000 Albums (3rd Edition, 2000). It was also featured on several year-end best-of lists for 1996:

- Entertainment Weekly (No. 2)
- Eye Weekly (No. 11)
- The Face (No. 28)
- Magnet (No. 26)
- Mojo (No. 4)
- NME (No. 16)
- Q (unranked)
- Rock Sound (French edition) (No. 2)
- Rolling Stone (No. 4)
- Spin (No. 11)
- Village Voice (No. 11)

== Track listing ==
All songs written by Bill Berry, Peter Buck, Mike Mills and Michael Stipe.

The Hi Side

1. "How the West Was Won and Where It Got Us" – 4:31
2. "The Wake-Up Bomb" – 5:08
3. "New Test Leper" – 5:26
4. "Undertow" – 5:09
5. "E-Bow the Letter" – 5:23
6. "Leave" – 7:18

The Fi Side

7. "Departure" – 3:28
8. "Bittersweet Me" – 4:06
9. "Be Mine" – 5:32
10. "Binky the Doormat" – 5:01
11. "Zither" – 2:33
12. "So Fast, So Numb" – 4:12
13. "Low Desert" – 3:30
14. "Electrolite" – 4:05

Unlike most R.E.M. albums, this vinyl release did not have custom side names; instead, it was released as a double album. Record one has tracks 1–6 (three songs per side) and record two has tracks 7–14 (four songs per side). The tape release maintained the custom side names: the first side was called the "Hi-side" and the second side was called the "Fi-side".

== Personnel ==
"How the West Was Won and Where It Got Us"

Recorded at Bad Animals Studio in Seattle, Washington

- Bill Berry – drums, percussion, "ennio whistle" (Note: The "Ennio Whistle" is the whistled two-note main theme melody of Ennio Morricone's score for Sergio Leone's 1966 spaghetti Western The Good, the Bad and the Ugly.)
- Peter Buck – guitar, mandolin, bouzouki, bass guitar
- Mike Mills – piano, backing vocals, synthesizer
- Michael Stipe – lead vocals, synthesizer

"The Wake-Up Bomb"

Recorded live at the North Charleston Coliseum in North Charleston, South Carolina, on November 16, 1995

- Bill Berry – drums, percussion
- Peter Buck – guitar
- Nathan December – guitar
- Mike Mills – bass guitar, backing vocals, organ
- Michael Stipe – lead vocals

"New Test Leper"

Recorded at Bad Animals Studio in Seattle, Washington

- Bill Berry – drums, percussion
- Peter Buck – guitar
- Mike Mills – bass guitar, organ
- Michael Stipe – vocals

"Undertow"

Recorded live at the FleetCenter in Boston, Massachusetts, on October 3, 1995

- Bill Berry – drums, percussion
- Peter Buck – guitar
- Nathan December – guitar
- Scott McCaughey – ARP Odyssey synthesizer
- Mike Mills – bass guitar, backing vocals
- Michael Stipe – lead vocals

"E-Bow the Letter"

Recorded at Bad Animals Studio in Seattle, Washington

- Bill Berry – drums, percussion
- Peter Buck – guitar, E-bow, electric sitar
- Mike Mills – bass guitar, organ, Moog synthesizer, Mellotron
- Patti Smith – vocals
- Michael Stipe – vocals

"Leave"

Recorded at a soundcheck at the Omni Coliseum in Atlanta, Georgia, on November 18, 19, or 21, 1995

- Bill Berry – drums, percussion, acoustic guitar, synthesizer
- Peter Buck – guitar, E-bow
- Nathan December – guitar
- Scott McCaughey – ARP Odyssey
- Mike Mills – bass guitar, keyboards
- Michael Stipe – vocals

"Departure"

Recorded live at The Palace of Auburn Hills in Auburn Hills, Michigan, on June 6 or 7, 1995

- Bill Berry – drums, percussion
- Peter Buck – guitar
- Nathan December – guitar
- Mike Mills – fuzz bass, backing vocals, Farfisa organ
- Michael Stipe – lead vocals

"Bittersweet Me"

Recorded at a soundcheck at the Pyramid Arena in Memphis, Tennessee, on November 7, 1995

- Bill Berry – drums, percussion
- Peter Buck – guitar
- Scott McCaughey – piano
- Mike Mills – bass guitar, organ, Mellotron
- Michael Stipe – vocals

"Be Mine"

Recorded at Bad Animals Studio in Seattle, Washington

- Bill Berry – drums, percussion
- Peter Buck – bass guitar, guitar, E-bow
- Mike Mills – guitar, backing vocals, keyboards
- Michael Stipe – lead vocals

"Binky the Doormat"

Recorded live at the Desert Sky Pavilion in Phoenix, Arizona, on November 4, 1995

- Bill Berry – drums, percussion, backing vocals
- Peter Buck – guitar
- Nathan December – guitar
- Scott McCaughey – Farfisa organ
- Mike Mills – fuzz bass, backing vocals, keyboards
- Michael Stipe – lead vocals

"Zither"

Recorded in the dressing room of the Spectrum in Philadelphia, Pennsylvania, on October 12, 13, or 14, 1995

- Bill Berry – bass guitar
- Peter Buck – guitar
- Nathan December – tambourine
- Scott McCaughey – autoharp
- Mike Mills – organ
- Michael Stipe – count in

"So Fast, So Numb"

Recorded at a soundcheck at the Orlando Arena in Orlando, Florida, on November 15, 1995

- Bill Berry – drums, percussion
- Peter Buck – guitar
- Scott McCaughey – piano
- Mike Mills – bass guitar, backing vocals, organ
- Michael Stipe – lead vocals

"Low Desert"
Recorded at a soundcheck at the Omni Theater in Atlanta, Georgia, on November 18, 19, or 21, 1995

- Bill Berry – drums, percussion
- Peter Buck – guitar
- Nathan December – slide guitar
- Scott McCaughey – piano
- Mike Mills – bass guitar, organ
- Michael Stipe – vocals

"Electrolite"

Recorded at a soundcheck at the Desert Sky Pavilion in Phoenix, Arizona, on November 4, 1995

- Bill Berry – drums, percussion
- Peter Buck – bass guitar, banjo
- Andy Carlson – violin
- Nathan December – güiro
- Mike Mills – piano
- Michael Stipe – vocals

Technical personnel

- William Field – assistant engineering, Athens
- Sam Hofstedt – assistant engineering, Seattle
- Victor Janacua – assistant engineering, Los Angeles
- Adam Kasper – recording engineering, Seattle
- John Keane – recording and mixing
- Scott Litt – co-producing and mixing engineering
- Bob Ludwig/Gateway Mastering – mastering
- Pat McCarthy – recording engineering, Los Angeles
- Mark "Microwave" Mytrowitz – technical assistance
- Joe O'Herlihy – tour recording engineering
- Jo Ravitch – tour recording engineering
- Eric Stolz – digital editing
- Jeff Wooding – tour recording engineering

== Chart performance ==
While New Adventures in Hi-Fi began the band's sales decline in the United States, it topped the charts in over a dozen countries and reached No. 1 on the Top European Albums for five consecutive weeks. The album peaked at No. 2 on the U.S. Billboard 200 and spent 22 weeks on chart. According to Nielsen SoundScan, it has sold 994,000 units in the U.S. as of March 2007. The first single, "E-Bow the Letter", received only modest radio airplay in the U.S. and peaked at No. 49 on its chart. In the UK, however, the single became the band's biggest hit at that point, reaching No. 4.

=== Weekly charts ===
Weekly chart performance for New Adventures in Hi-Fi
Chart (1996–97)	Position
Australian Albums (ARIA)	1
Austrian Albums (Ö3 Austria)	1
Belgian Albums (Ultratop Flanders)	1
Belgian Albums (Ultratop Wallonia)	3
Canada Top Albums/CDs (RPM)	1
Canadian Albums (The Record)	1
Danish Albums (IFPI/Nielsen Music Control)	1
Dutch Albums (Album Top 100)	1
European Albums (European Top 100 Albums)	1
Finnish Albums (Suomen virallinen lista)	1
French Albums (SNEP)	6
German Albums (Offizielle Top 100)	1
Hungarian Albums (MAHASZ)	7
Irish Albums (IRMA)	1
Japanese Albums (Oricon)	26
New Zealand Albums (RMNZ)	1
Norwegian Albums (VG-lista)	1
Portuguese Albums (AFP)	2
Scottish Albums (Official Charts)	1
Spanish Albums (AFYVE)	5
Swedish Albums (Sverigetopplistan)	1
Swiss Albums (Schweizer Hitparade)	1
UK Albums (Official Charts)	1
US Billboard 200	2

=== Year-end charts ===
1996 year-end chart performance
Chart (1996)	Position
Australian Albums (ARIA)	58
Austrian Albums (Ö3 Austria Top 40)	16
Canada Top Albums/CDs (RPM)	14
Dutch Albums (Album Top 100)	78
European Albums (European Top 100 Albums)	19
German Albums (Offizielle Top 100)	34
New Zealand Albums (RMNZ)	25
Norwegian Albums (VG-lista)	5
Swedish Albums & Compilations (Sverigetopplistan)	37
Swiss Albums (Schweizer Hitparade)	50
UK Albums (OCC)	34
US Billboard 200	96

== Certifications ==
Sales and certifications for New Adventures in Hi-Fi
Region	Certification	Certified units/sales
Austria (IFPI Austria)	Gold	25,000^{*}
Belgium (BRMA)	Gold	25,000^{*}
Canada (Music Canada)	2× Platinum	200,000^{^}
Germany (BVMI)	Gold	250,000^{^}
New Zealand (RMNZ)	Platinum	15,000^{^}
Norway (IFPI Norway)	Gold	25,000^{*}
Spain (Promusicae)	Gold	50,000^{^}
Sweden (GLF)	Gold	40,000^{^}
Switzerland (IFPI Switzerland)	Gold	25,000^{^}
United Kingdom (BPI)	Platinum	350,000
United States (RIAA)	Platinum	994,000
Summaries
Europe (IFPI)	Platinum	1,000,000^{*}
^{*} Sales figures based on certification alone.^{^} Shipments figures based on certification alone.

== Release history ==
Like all R.E.M. albums since 1988's Green, New Adventures in Hi-Fi was released in a limited-edition packaging. This one contained a 64-page hardcover book designed by Chris Bilheimer and featuring photos from the Monster tour. In 2005, Warner Brothers Records issued an expanded two-disc edition of the album which included a CD, a DVD-Audio disc containing a new audio mix of the album (in 5.1-channel surround sound, high resolution, AC3, Dolby Stereo, and DTS 5.1) done by Elliot Scheiner and the original CD booklet with expanded liner notes. In addition, the DVD includes a video documentary, lyrics, and a photo gallery.

As with the prior albums, a 25th-anniversary edition was announced in August 2021 for an October release date. The edition includes a remastered album, B-sides from the album and a Blu-ray with previously unreleased promotional materials. Due to issues related to the 2021 global supply chain crisis, all CD variations of the remastered reissue were delayed to mid-November 2021.

Region	Date	Label	Format	Catalog
Worldwide	September 9, 1996	Warner Bros.	Compact disc, cassette tape, double LP	46320
United States	September 10, 1996	Warner Bros.	Compact disc, cassette, 2LP	46320
United States	September 10, 1996	Warner Bros.	Limited-edition compact disc	46321
Worldwide	March 1, 2005	Warner Bros.	Compact disc and DVD-Audio	73950
Worldwide	October 29, 2021	Craft Recordings	2LP	CR00438
Worldwide	November 5, 2021	Craft Recordings	2CD	CR00440
Worldwide	November 12, 2021	Craft Recordings	2CD/1 Blu-ray/book	CR00439
