= New Test Leper =

Song by R.E.M

- Germany promotional release

Promotional single by R.E.M.

from the album New Adventures in Hi-Fi
- Released: September 9, 1996 (UK); September 10, 1996 (U.S.)
- Studio: Bad Animals, Seattle, Washington
- Genre: Alternative rock
- Length: 5:26
- Label: Warner Bros.
- Songwriters: Bill Berry; Peter Buck; Mike Mills; Michael Stipe
- Producers: Scott Litt; R.E.M.

"New Test Leper" is a song by R.E.M., included on their tenth studio album, New Adventures in Hi-Fi, which was released in 1996. It was not released as a single; its only non-album issue was on a 1996 Germany-only-released Warner Bros. Records promotional CD. The song was also included in the greatest hits compilation Part Lies, Part Heart, Part Truth, Part Garbage 1982–2011, released in 2011 soon after the group disbanded. The song was played live throughout the Up tour in 1998 and 1999. In 2003, it was played live for two concerts, was played once in 2005, once in 2007, and one final time in 2008.

== Recording ==
The song was recorded at Bad Animals Studio in Seattle, Washington, in March 1996, four months after R.E.M. completed their 1995 world tour in support of their previous album, Monster. On the track, Bill Berry plays drums and shaker; Peter Buck plays guitar; Mike Mills, bass and organ; and Michael Stipe provides the vocals, which were penned during moments of downtime at the studio.

The following month, on April 19, the band recorded an acoustic version of the song at the same location. That version was released as a B-side to the "Bittersweet Me" single. The video of the performance, directed by Lance Bangs, was used as the video to the album version of the song in the Bonus Videos section on the band's In View DVD, released in 2003.

== Songwriting and lyrics ==
Stipe said in a 2008 Q&A that the protagonist of the song was inspired by seeing a trans woman on a talk show "trying to explain and defend her choices and orientation. It was painful to watch her basically humiliated simply by the decision to be on the show. And with commercial breaks. I couldn’t imagine what was said when they were off camera. Glaring horrible studio lighting."

The first line of the song contains the lyrics "I can't say that I love Jesus", attracting some controversy. Peter Buck clarified the matter to Q magazine's Tom Doyle in 1996: "It's written from the perspective of a character that Michael saw on TV on a talk show. But are people going to think Michael's talking about himself not liking Jesus? I don't think that people will take us that seriously. It's not like we're tearing up a picture of the Pope on television." He was referring to Sinéad O'Connor's 1992 Saturday Night Live incident.

"'New Test Leper' is something that we only played at soundcheck, like, twice," Buck explained in another interview, this time to Addicted to Noise's Michael Goldberg, also in 1996. "And for some reason, we just forgot about it and never really played it. I don’t know why. Michael just happened to luckily enough have it on tape. He says, 'I’ve got this great stuff for that song and none of us even remember playing it.' So we cut it here in Seattle when we did the record. I think it’s probably the most R.E.M.-ish sounding thing on the record. Literally, Michael was watching one of those talk shows and I think the subject was ‘People judge me by the way I look’ or something. Whereas I, when I have the misfortune to look for two minutes at one of those Oprah, Geraldo things, I just get revolted at everyone concerned: the audience, me. Michael actually looked at it and felt like, ‘Gosh, what if someone’s actually trying to communicate something to these people and this person who’s in this awful, tacky, degrading situation?’ So it’s written from that perspective. And I think probably having done press conferences in the past and being in those kinds of situations, there might be a little empathy from experience that we’ve had.”

According to Darryl White's R.E.M. Timeline, "New Test Leper" received its first live airing on May 31, 1997, at the Variety Playhouse in Atlanta during the final show of The Magnificent 7 vs. The United States' tour. The "Magnificent 7" was composed of Peter Buck, Mark Eitzel, Justin Harwood, Dan Pearson, Barrett Martin, Scott McCaughey and Skerik Walton, with other people performing occasionally. Buck's R.E.M. bandmates were present, and the guitarist left Eitzel to perform the last encore to go backstage and talk with the trio. Berry, however, had already departed and was on his way home. “Bill phoned me after the show to tell me he’d loved it,” explained Buck. “But he had to leave halfway through because he was scared he’d be asked to play. It had taken him two hours to drive there; he stayed for forty minutes, and then drove home so he wouldn’t be asked to play one R.E.M. song." The remaining threesome put together a short set and took to the stage.

During R.E.M.'s performance on VH1 Storytellers in 1998, Stipe explained the background of the song he described as his "crowning achievement": how he initially (and, thankfully for him, erroneously) thought he'd stolen the song's "biggest line" - What a sad parade - from his friend Vic Chesnutt; how he wanted to write a follow-up to the only other song he knew that contained the word Jesus in the first line - namely Patti Smith's re-working of Van Morrison's "Gloria" ("Jesus died for somebody's sins but not mine"); how he "wanted to write a song that was in the 6/8 polka kind of thing, but wanted the vocal to be contrapuntal; and how he quoted his favorite movie in the second verse ("I am not an animal," from The Elephant Man, a movie that Stipe says also inspired R.E.M.'s "Carnival of Sorts (Box Cars)", amongst others).

Regarding Mike Mills' bass line, in 2023, he told Vulture: "I try to keep my bass lines a certain way, but for some reason with 'New Test Leper' I decided to basically play a bass solo all the way through the verses. You don't want the bass by itself, but in terms of free-forming and playing a lot of notes and having a lot of fun with it, I think 'New Test Leper' is the one where I took the guardrails off of it and had a good time."
