= Lotus (R.E.M. song) =

Song by R.E.M.

Single by R.E.M.

from the album Up
- B-side: "Surfing the Ganges"
- Released: December 7, 1998
- Genre: Glam rock; psychedelic rock
- Length: 4:30
- Label: Warner Bros.
- Songwriters: Peter Buck; Mike Mills; Michael Stipe
- Producers: Pat McCarthy; R.E.M.

R.E.M. singles chronology
"Daysleeper" (1998)	"Lotus" (1998)	"At My Most Beautiful" (1999)

"Lotus" is a song by American rock band R.E.M., released as the second single from their eleventh studio album, Up (1998). The song is somewhat minimalist, with Michael Stipe singing surreal lyrics in a percussive manner. It builds on a four-note keyboard part, with a distorted guitar riff at the beginning and after the second chorus. The song's recurring line "I ate the lotus" appeared in an alternate form ("I'll eat the lotus...") in a previous R.E.M. song, "Be Mine". The line "dot dot dot and I feel fine" is a reference to R.E.M.'s 1987 hit "It's the End of the World as We Know It (And I Feel Fine)".

For live performances of the song, Peter Buck alternates between electric guitar (chorus) and keyboard (verse). "Playing keyboard always excites me," Buck explained in a soundbite during MTV Uplink, a recording of the band's performance at New York's Bowery Ballroom in October 1998, "even though it's only with one finger." "But it's a big finger," joked Mills. "It's great."

== Music video ==
The single's video, directed by Stéphane Sednaoui, was included as a bonus video on the DVD release of In View - The Best of R.E.M. 1988-2003. "I wanted to work with Stephane for a long time," Stipe explained to MTV UK during An Hour with R.E.M. in 2001 after selecting the video for airplay. "Since I saw the video that he did with Björk for, what was that called, 'Big Time Sexuality' or something? Where she looks exactly like Shirley MacLaine, 1959–1961. The Apartment, I think, was the name of the film. Shirley MacLaine and Björk as Shirley MacLaine on the back of a pick-up truck driving down 5th Avenue in New York City, probably. But I thought this guy exudes sex, he's like sex on a stick, and I wanted to work with him for that reason. He somehow transmogrified that very thing through me. I look very, very foxy in this video, which is why I chose it; it shows off my incredible stomach muscles."

== Track listings ==
All songs were written by Peter Buck, Mike Mills, and Michael Stipe unless otherwise indicated. The live version of "Suspicion" is different from the Ealing Studio recording found on the 1999 "Suspicion" single.

Canadian, Australian, and Japanese CD single

1. "Lotus" (LP version) – 4:30
2. "Surfing the Ganges" – 2:25
3. "Suspicion" (live in the studio) – 5:39
4. "Lotus" (Weird mix) – 4:34

UK CD single

1. "Lotus" – 4:30
2. "Surfing the Ganges" – 2:25
3. "Lotus" (Weird mix) – 4:34

UK cassette single and European CD single

1. "Lotus" – 4:30
2. "Surfing the Ganges" – 2:25

UK mini-CD single

1. "Lotus" – 4:31
2. "Suspicion" (live in the studio) – 5:39

== Charts ==
=== Weekly charts ===
Weekly chart performance for "Lotus"
Chart (1998–1999)	Peak position
Belgium (Ultratip Bubbling Under Flanders)	18
Canada Top Singles (RPM)	32
Canada Adult Contemporary (RPM)	56
Canada Rock/Alternative (RPM)	25
Europe (Eurochart Hot 100)	88
Iceland (Íslenski Listinn Topp 40)	1
Italy Airplay (Music & Media)	9
New Zealand (Recorded Music NZ)	50
Scottish Singles Sales (Official Charts)	23
Sweden (Sverigetopplistan)	60
UK Singles (Official Charts)	26
US Adult Alternative Airplay (Billboard)	4
US Alternative Airplay (Billboard)	31
US Mainstream Rock (Billboard)	31

=== Year-end charts ===
Annual chart performance for "Lotus"
Chart (1999)	Position
US Triple-A (Billboard)	34

== Release history ==
Overview of formats for "Lotus" single releases
Region	Date	Format(s)	Label(s)	Ref.
United Kingdom	December 7, 1998	CD; cassette	Warner Bros.	
Japan	December 16, 1998	CD	Warner Bros.	
United States	January 11, 1999	Active rock radio	Warner Bros.	
