= Andy Carlson =

American musician

Andrew Carlson is a violinist from the United States.

He began learning traditional fiddle music from his grandfather when he was five. He has won numerous fiddle contests including being named Georgia State Champion Fiddler twice and being named the 2000 Ohio Grand Champion fiddler. His book entitled A Guide to American Fiddling (ISBN 0786607335) was released by Mel Bay Publishers. As a studio musician and string arranger he has recorded for Warner Bros., Atlantic, Elektra, Geffen, Polydor, and Capricorn and with artists including R.E.M., Nanci Griffith, Billy Bragg, and the Cowboy Junkies. As a soloist, Carlson has performed with orchestras such as the Columbus Symphony Orchestra.

Referenced as a 'Demon Fiddler' in a 1998 New York Times Music Review , Carlson received his MM and BMUS from the University of Georgia and his DMA in Performance and Pedagogy from the University of Iowa. He has served as a faculty member at Morehead State University, and served on the faculty of Denison University through the 2017–2018 academic year. In 2000 Carlson started a Bluegrass program at Denison University, and the university now allows music majors to have a concentration in Bluegrass. Carlson is currently an adjunct instructor of music at Furman University where he founded the GreenvilleBillies, the university's first bluegrass ensemble.

Carlson also has his own band, The Andy Carlson Band, that performs music ranging from traditional Old-Time Appalachian, Bluegrass, Swing, Blues, "New" Grass, Classical, and Contemporary Acoustic. With Carlson on Fiddle, the band includes Greg Earnest on Banjo, Casey Cook on Guitar, Michael Smith on Mandolin and Keith Morris on Bass all of whom are also members of the Atlanta-based Bluegrass band The Dappled Grays.

== Discography ==
- The Andy Carlson Band - Fiddlehead (2010)
- The Andy Carlson Band - Log-A-Rhythm (2005)
- Andy Carlson - Beyond Boundaries (2002)
- R.E.M. - "Electrolite", from New Adventures in Hi-Fi (1996)
- Billy Bragg -"You Woke Up My Neighbourhood", from Don't Try This At Home (1991)
