= E-Bow the Letter =

1996 single by R.E.M.

Single by R.E.M.

from the album New Adventures in Hi-Fi
- B-side: "Tricycle"; "Departure"; "Wall of Death"
- Released: August 19, 1996
- Studio: Bad Animals (Seattle, Washington)
- Genre: Folk rock; avant-rock
- Length: 5:22
- Label: Warner Bros.
- Songwriters: Bill Berry; Peter Buck; Mike Mills; Michael Stipe
- Producers: Scott Litt; R.E.M.

R.E.M. singles chronology
"Tongue" (1995)	"E-Bow the Letter" (1996)	"Bittersweet Me" (1996)

Music video
- "E-Bow the Letter" on YouTube

Patti Smith singles chronology
"Summer Cannibals" (1996)	"E-Bow the Letter" (1996)	"1959" (1997)

"E-Bow the Letter" is the first single from American rock band R.E.M.'s tenth studio album, New Adventures in Hi-Fi (1996). It was released on August 19, 1996, several weeks before the album's release. During the same month, R.E.M. signed a then record-breaking five-album contract with Warner Bros. Records. The song features American singer-songwriter and "Godmother of Punk" Patti Smith performing backing vocals. Smith was cited as a major influence by band members Michael Stipe and Peter Buck, and she also provided backing vocals for "Blue", the closing track on the band's final studio album, Collapse into Now, in 2011.

Although the song peaked at number four on the UK Singles Chart, the highest any R.E.M. song charted in the United Kingdom until "The Great Beyond" in 2000, the song fared less well in the United States, reaching only number 49 on the Billboard Hot 100. It became R.E.M.'s lowest-charting lead single since "Fall on Me" released from Lifes Rich Pageant in 1986, when the band was on a smaller record label, I.R.S. Records. Jem Cohen directed the song's music video, which features R.E.M. in Los Angeles and Smith in Prague.

Dedicated to the memory of actor and musician River Phoenix, a personal friend of Stipe's who died in 1993 from an opioid overdose, "E-Bow the Letter" received critical acclaim, although some reviewers noted that it was an unlikely song to be chosen as the album's lead single, especially due to its introspective content and "pessimistic nature." Meanwhile, other outlets praised the band's brave choice to use such a song as the first track from New Adventures in Hi-Fi.

== Background and composition ==
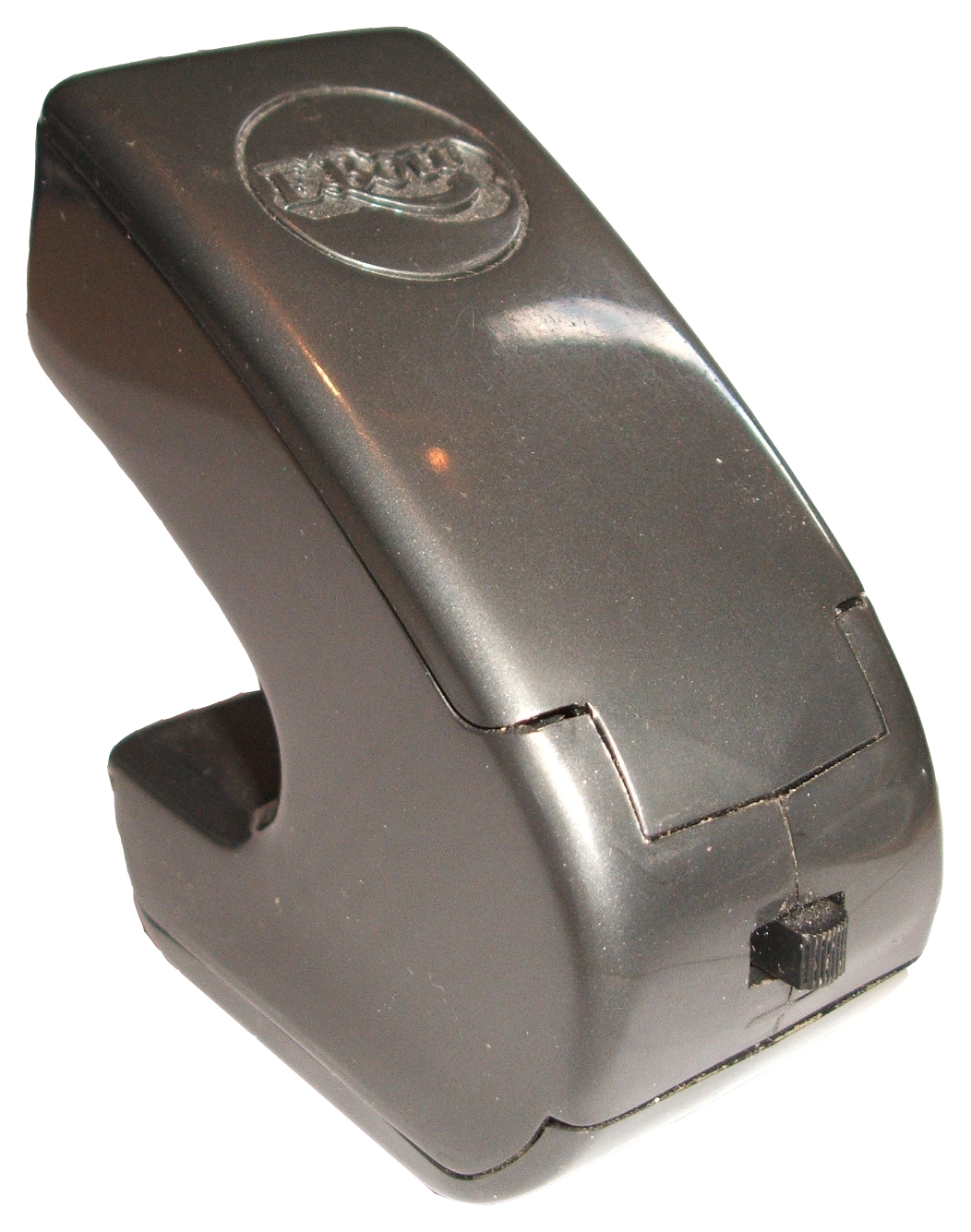
Guitarist Peter Buck used an EBow to make certain riffs, hence the song's title.

The song is about Stipe's friend, the actor and musician River Phoenix. The title refers to the EBow, an electromagnetic field-generating device that induces sustained vibration in an electric guitar string (creating a violin-like effect), and to a "letter never sent" by Michael Stipe. This device is present in the track and appears in the music video, and in live performances guitarist Peter Buck often used it. R.E.M. has also played the song live with artists including Thom Yorke singing Patti Smith's vocal part. Phoenix was going through difficult times in 1993 due to his excessive drug use, something that inspired Stipe to compose the lyrics for the song; the actor died on October 31 of that same year due to an overdose of cocaine and heroin.

Buck recalled what it was like to record the track with Smith, saying, "Patti Smith singing on something that I helped write was just amazing. She changed my life in a real literal way in 1976 when I saw her play live. She changed my perception of what music was". "E-Bow the Letter" is not the only song by the band in which she makes an appearance; she also provided the backing vocals for "Blue", the closing track of the group's last studio album Collapse into Now (2011).

The song lasts five minutes and twenty-two seconds, is composed in the key of G major and E minor in the introduction, which is repeated three times, and has a tempo of 80 beats per minute. The band described the song as a "folk dirge". Marcus Gilmer of The A.V. Club said that the "dirge-like" song "dabbles in Middle Eastern sounds—thanks to the use of the titular instrument—and features Patti Smith's haunting backing vocals." The song showed how the band's "enigmatic lyrics are glowing clearer, like images emerging on photographic paper". The song's stream of consciousness lyrics, writes Jessica Kennedy of MTV News, "reveal a vulnerable side, full of doubts".

In 2019, Stipe stated that the song is the only one for which he wrote the lyrics before the music was formed, it having been part of a letter. The band played the song during a soundcheck on the Monster Tour, and Stipe ran backstage to retrieve the letter and put its words to the music.

== Release and impact ==
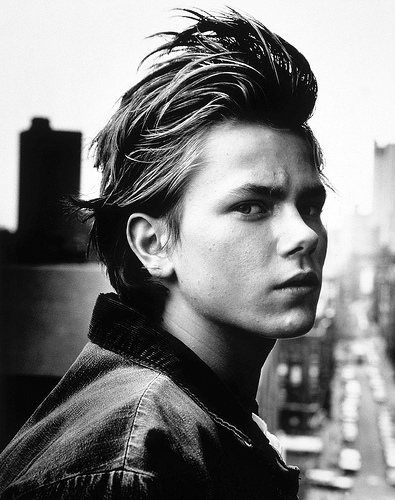
"E-Bow the Letter" is dedicated in memory of American actor River Phoenix (photographed in 1987), who died in 1993 from an opioid overdose. The actor maintained a close friendship with Michael Stipe.

According to biographer David Buckley, New Adventures in Hi-Fi, with its sombre, muted tone, had "no obvious singles or radio hits," although Consequence of Sound noted that R.E.M. could have selected a pop-oriented song like "Bittersweet Me" to trail the album, yet "stuck to their guns". "E-Bow the Letter", one of the album's more introverted songs, was selected by R.E.M. as the lead single. Given its downbeat, "almost dirge-like" nature, spoken word verses, "Dylanesque vocal delivery" and funereal pace, it was considered an unusual and brave choice as, says Buckley, "it was largely inappropriate for hit radio". According to British chart watcher James Masterton in his column for Dotmusic, the single followed R.E.M.'s typical "marketing habit of issuing one of the most uncommercial tracks from the album as the lead single. Just like 'Drive' back in 1992 the track at first sounds like a monotonous, tuneless mess which has caused radio programmers a few headaches, caught between the demand for people to hear the new single from one of the biggest groups in the world and the fact that it sounds so totally weird."

According to Patrick M. Reilly of The Wall Street Journal, executives at Warner Bros. said that "the band's choice of a droning, dirge-like first single" negatively impacted the album's sales. A retrospective article Consequence of Sound said that the song not only thwarted the album's commercial success, but also for R.E.M. going forward. "It was a proud display of artistic integrity," writes Stephen Troussé, "a label-infuriating demonstration that they commanded complete liberty." David Stubbs of Uncut said the "heavy-duty avant-folk-rock" song was "another of REM’s unapologetic anti-single singles," with another to follow in 1997's "How the West Was Won and Where It Got Us". "Whatever is vexing them is inscrutable to the casual listener; indeed, obscurely compelling as the song is, it seems from one angle like a deliberate attempt to shed extraneous fans."

Mike Mills said the band's choice of lead single was "in reaction to the fact that we've never taken the easy way out. It's important for us to challenge ourselves and the audience. Audiences can respond well to things like that, like putting out 'Drive' from Automatic for the People. That was a very important decision for us, and the record company weren't real thrilled about it, but they trust us and they know we have reasons for what we do, and it usually works out. It didn't do Automatic much harm." Stipe reflected that the group held the ability "to release the most unlikely songs just to push radio as far as we could push them, get more good music on the radio. And there was… for a while. 'E-Bow the Letter' sounded the death knell for us being able to do that! But I think it represents some of my best writing."

== Critical reception ==
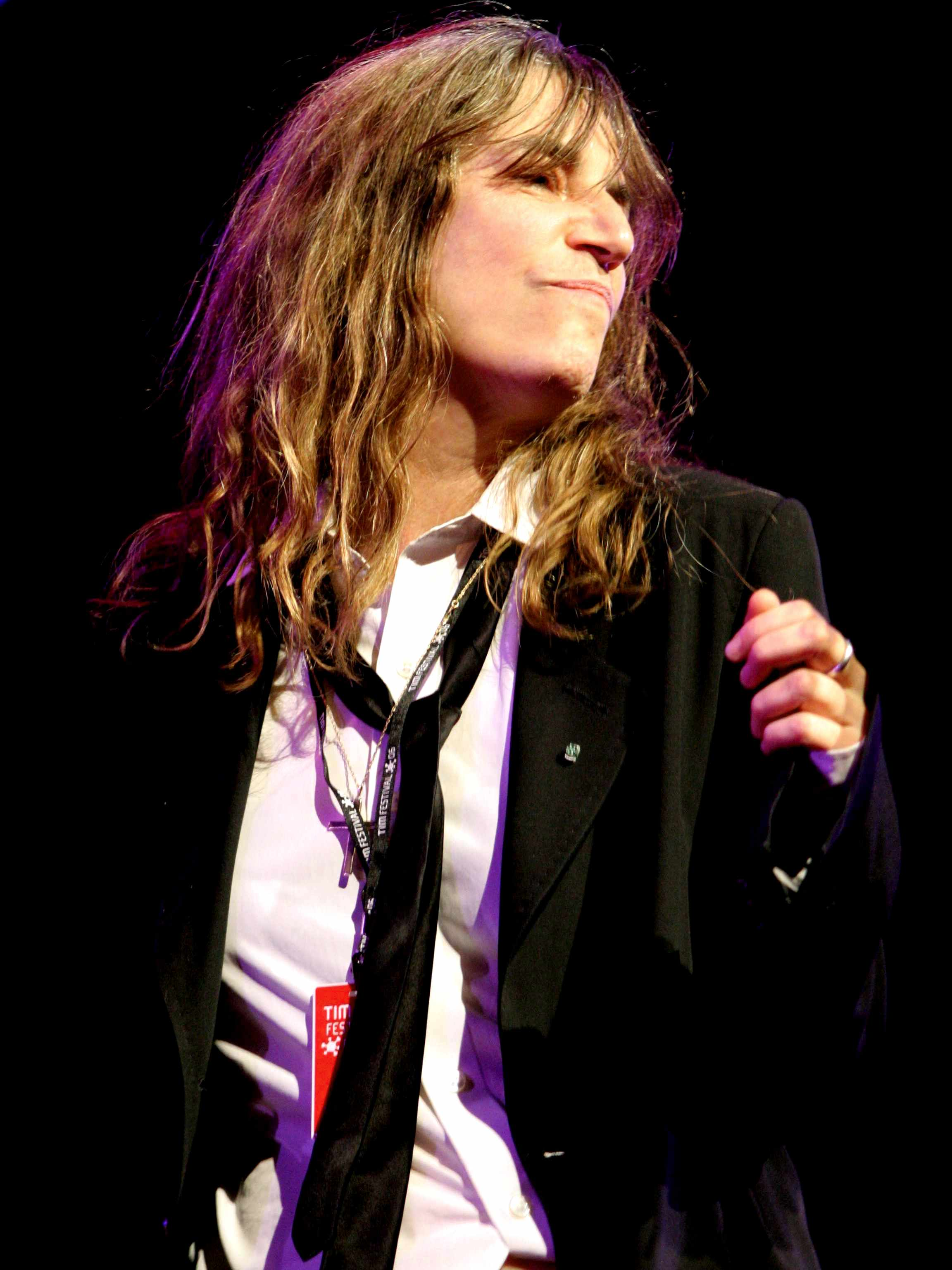
Patti Smith—an influence on Peter Buck and Michael Stipe—provided backing vocals to the song. Her performance was highly praised by the critics.

"E-Bow the Letter" received praise from specialized critics. Larry Flick from Billboard described the song as "one of the band's typically introspective rock ballads." He added:

Michael Stipe trounces through thickly textured patches of swelling organs, acoustic strumming, and razor-sharp, sparingly placed electric guitars with the sad, furrowed brow and eternally ponderous voice that has become his signature. Patti Smith wraps the song with deceptively soothing incantations that effectively sneak up from behind the music to a full-frontal caterwaul by the track's close. Artful, affecting, and undeniably accessible...three solid traits of any R.E.M. recording.

"E-Bow the Letter" was ranked number 21 on NME magazine's list of the "Singles of the Year". Pitchfork Media founder and owner Ryan Schreiber described it on the website as "possibly one of the greatest songs ever written." Masterton called the song "so totally weird" and compared it to Mott the Hoople's 1972 single "All the Young Dudes", which features similar instrumentation. Paul Lester from Melody Maker felt it "is R.E.M. at their most gorgeously maudlin". Another Melody Maker editor, Mark Luffman, wrote, "Nevertheless, "E-Bow the Letter" does come out of nowhere R.E.M. have been before, right from its "All the Young Dudes" intro. Almost a Gene Clark song. This is R.E.M.'s "Tusk", inasmuch as it's a song we didn't quite expect them to come up with."

Thomas Ward of AllMusic described it as one of R.E.M.'s best compositions from the 1990s and as the centerpiece of one of their "most forgotten and underrated" albums. The critic stated:

"E-Bow the Letter" is one of R.E.M's finest songs of the 1990s, and the centrepiece of one of their most neglected and undervalued albums, New Adventures In Hi-Fi. Containing a terrific, guitar driven arrangement, and an unusual, but catchy melody, the song is essentially a showcase for Michael Stipe's quick-fire, somewhat oblique lyric, although containing some wonderful moments (such as 'Dreaming of Maria Callas/Whoever she is'). The song's success is driven from its unusualness – the lyric and chord structure are certainly unconventional, and the plain weirdness of Stipe's lyric. As such, it does not warrant literal explanation, but is nevertheless an enthralling listening experience."

The A.V. Club ranked it at number 31 on their list of R.E.M.'s Top 40 Songs, stating: "The band, joined here by Stipe's avowed heroine, Patti Smith, plays with divine fire on this magnificent track from the 1996 album. New Adventures In Hi-Fi. Stipe genuflects before his idol, giving her the space to steal the show at the song's outro" and concluded that this is "a staggeringly powerful and appropriate collaboration."

== Chart performance ==
On the US Billboard Hot 100, "E-Bow the Letter" debuted at number 54 on September 7, 1996, reaching its peak of number 49 the following week and spending nine weeks on the chart altogether. The song reached the top five on the Billboard Modern Rock Tracks chart, peaking at number two on September 14, 1996, and entered the top 10 on the Triple-A ranking, reaching number seven on September 7 and spending seven weeks on the chart. The song also appeared on the Billboard Mainstream Rock Tracks and Maxi-Singles Sales charts, reaching numbers 15 and 39, respectively, on September 14. Along with "What's the Frequency, Kenneth?", it is the only R.E.M. song to appear on the latter listing. In Canada, the track reached the top 10, peaking at number six on the RPM 100 Hit Tracks chart and at number one on the RPM Alternative 30. The magazine later ranked the song as Canada's 53rd-best-performing single of 1996 as well as the 30th-best-performing rock song.

In the United Kingdom, "E-Bow the Letter" became the band's highest-charting single until "The Great Beyond" in 2000, debuting and peaking at number four on the UK Singles Chart based on its "typically wry sense of humour". Giving R.E.M. their 18th top-40 hit on the UK chart, the song spent six weeks in the top 100. The song also reached the top 10 in Ireland, where it reached number eight. In Iceland, "E-Bow the Letter" rose to number two on the Íslenski listinn chart after seven weeks, eventually ending 1996 as the country's 41st-most-successful single. The track became R.E.M.'s fifth top-10 hit in Norway, debuting and peaking at number six, where it remained for two weeks. In Finland, the song peaked within the top 20, reaching number 11 on the Finnish Singles Chart. Elsewhere in Europe, "E-Bow the Letter" appeared on the charts of Austria, Flanders, Germany, and the Netherlands, achieving a peak of number 28 on the Eurochart Hot 100. In Australia, the song reached number 23 on the ARIA Singles Chart and spent four weeks in the top 50, while in New Zealand, it debuted at its peak of number 32 and left the RIANZ Singles Chart after three weeks.

== Music video ==
The music video was directed by Afghan-born American filmmaker Jem Cohen and features clips and footage from Los Angeles, while other scenes show the band performing the song in a room filled with lights. At one point in the video guitarist Peter Buck can be seen using the EBow, and in other scenes there's Patti Smith in Prague, Czech Republic. For Difuser, Bryan Wawzenek of the same site commented that the music video seems "like a melancholic continuation of 'Nightswimming' with burnt and nocturnal scenes." Matthew Perpetua of Rolling Stone praised the video by stating:

Jem Cohen’s dim, romantic clip for “E-Bow the Letter,” R.E.M.’s 1996 collaboration with Patti Smith, is ideally suited to the sound and sentiment of the song, which remains one of the band’s finest and most distinct compositions. Cohen’s lonely street scenes are gorgeous, but the images of Stipe performing with the band in a room lit by hundreds of tiny white lights are among the most elegant and breathtaking shots in the band’s filmography.

== Track listings ==
All songs were written by Bill Berry, Peter Buck, Mike Mills, and Michael Stipe, except where noted.

- US CD, cassette, and 7-inch single
- UK cassette single
1. "E-Bow the Letter" (Seattle studio) – 5:22 (5:24 on UK version)
2. "Tricycle" (St. Louis soundcheck) – 1:58 (1:59 on UK version)
- US 12-inch and maxi-CD single
- UK and European CD single
1. "E-Bow the Letter" (Seattle studio) – 5:22 (5:24 on UK version)
2. "Tricycle" (St. Louis soundcheck) – 1:58 (1:59 on UK version)
3. "Departure" (Rome soundcheck) – 3:35
4. "Wall of Death" (Athens studio) (Richard Thompson) – 3:07
- Australian CD single
1. "E-Bow the Letter" – 5:24
2. "Tricycle" – 1:59
3. "Departure" (live) – 3:35
4. "Wall of Death" (Thompson) – 3:07

== Credits and personnel ==
Credits are adapted from the US CD single liner notes and the New Adventures in Hi-Fi booklet.

Studio

- Recorded at Bad Animals (Seattle)

R.E.M.

- Michael Stipe – vocals
- Peter Buck – guitar, EBow, electric sitar
- Mike Mills – bass, organ, Mellotron, Moog synthesizer
- Bill Berry – drums, percussion
- R.E.M. – production

Additional personnel

- Patti Smith – vocals
- Scott Litt – production, mixing

== Charts ==
=== Weekly charts ===
Chart (1996)	Peak position
Australia (ARIA)	23
Austria (Ö3 Austria Top 40)	27
Belgium (Ultratop 50 Flanders)	48
Canada Top Singles (RPM)	6
Canada Rock/Alternative (RPM)	1
Europe (Eurochart Hot 100)	28
Finland (Suomen virallinen lista)	11
Germany (GfK)	65
Iceland (Íslenski Listinn Topp 40)	2
Ireland (IRMA)	8
Italy Airplay (Music & Media)	5
Netherlands (Dutch Top 40 Tipparade)	11
Netherlands (Single Top 100 Tipparade)	12
New Zealand (Recorded Music NZ)	32
Norway (VG-lista)	6
Scottish Singles Sales (Official Charts)	2
UK Singles (Official Charts)	4
US Billboard Hot 100	49
US Adult Alternative Airplay (Billboard)	7
US Alternative Airplay (Billboard)	2
US Dance Singles Sales (Billboard)	39
US Mainstream Rock (Billboard)	15

=== Year-end charts ===
Chart (1996)	Position
Canada Top Singles (RPM)	53
Canada Rock/Alternative (RPM)	30
Iceland (Íslenski Listinn Topp 40)	41
US Modern Rock Tracks (Billboard)	67

== Release history ==
Region	Date	Format(s)	Label	Ref.
United States	August 14, 1996	All rock radio formats	Warner Bros.	
United Kingdom	August 19, 1996	CD; cassette	Warner Bros.	
United States	August 20, 1996	7-inch vinyl; CD; cassette	Warner Bros.	
United States	August 27, 1996	Maxi-CD	Warner Bros.	
United States	September 24, 1996	Contemporary hit radio	Warner Bros.	
Japan	October 25, 1996	CD	Warner Bros.	

== See also ==
- List of RPM Rock/Alternative number-one singles (Canada)
