= Electrolite =

1996 single by R.E.M.

Single by R.E.M.

from the album New Adventures in Hi-Fi
- B-side: "The Wake-Up Bomb" (live); "Binky the Doormat" (live); "King of Comedy" (remix)
- Released: December 2, 1996
- Recorded: November 4, 1995
- Studio: Bad Animals (Seattle)
- Venue: Desert Sky Pavilion (Phoenix, Arizona)
- Genre: Folk pop; jangle pop
- Length: 4:05
- Label: Warner Bros.
- Songwriters: Bill Berry; Peter Buck; Mike Mills; Michael Stipe
- Producers: Scott Litt; R.E.M.

R.E.M. singles chronology
"Bittersweet Me" (1996)	"Electrolite" (1996)	"How the West Was Won and Where It Got Us" (1997)

Music video
- "Electrolite" on YouTube

"Electrolite" is a song by American rock band R.E.M., released as the closing track from their tenth studio album, New Adventures in Hi-Fi (1996), and as the album's third single later that year. The song is a piano-based ballad dedicated to Hollywood and the closing twentieth century. Frontman Michael Stipe initially objected to including the song on the album, but was convinced by his bandmates Peter Buck and Mike Mills.

The single was released by Warner Bros. Records on December 2, 1996, in the United Kingdom and on February 2, 1997, in the United States. "Electrolite" reached the top 40 in Canada, Finland, Iceland, and the United Kingdom but stalled at number 96 on the US Billboard Hot 100, giving it their lowest-charting single. The single's music video, directed by Peter Care and Spike Jonze, "involved dune buggies, crazy costumes, and rubber reindeer."

== Composition ==
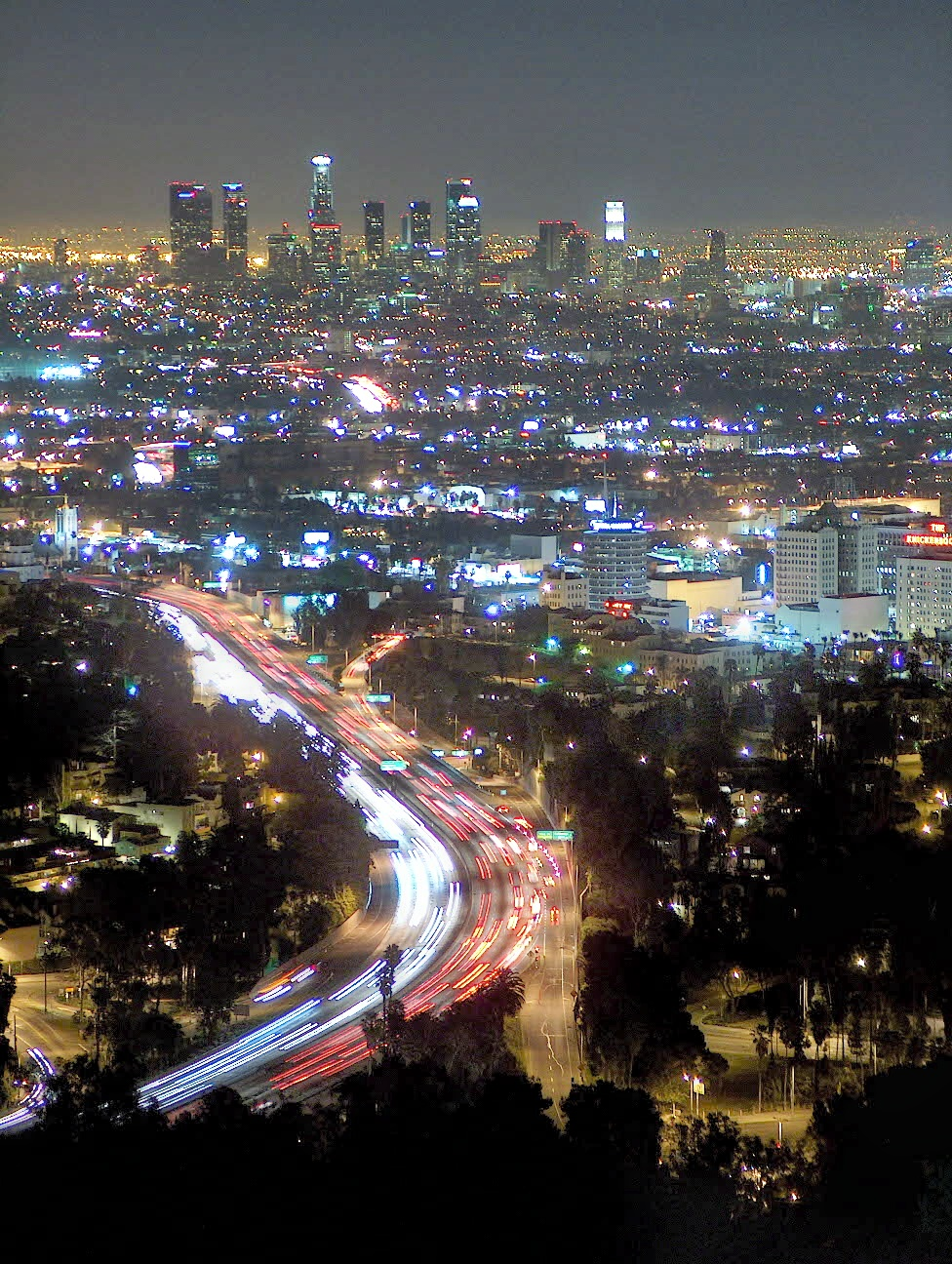
Los Angeles at night, as viewed from Mulholland Drive

The piano line for the song was originally written by Mills in his apartment before bringing it to the band. The lyrics were composed by Stipe about the two-year period he spent living in Santa Monica and the trips he would take to look down on Los Angeles from Mulholland Drive. During a performance in Atlanta in June 2008, Stipe mentioned that he had been inspired to write the song after the 1994 Northridge earthquake.

Most of New Adventures in Hi-Fi was recorded while the group was on tour promoting Monster; "Electrolite" was recorded by Joe O'Herlihy, Scott Litt, and Jo Ravitch during a soundcheck before a performance at the Desert Sky Pavilion in Phoenix, Arizona, on November 4, 1995. Stipe recorded his vocal track at Bad Animal Studios in Seattle after the tour concluded. Stipe initially did not want to include the song on the album, but was persuaded to by his bandmates.

=== Lyrical content ===
In June 2006, the website of the Los Angeles Times featured an article on Mulholland Drive including excerpts from an essay written by Stipe:

"Mulholland represents to me the iconic 'from on high' vantage point looking down at L.A. and the valley at night when the lights are all sparkling and the city looks, like it does from a plane, like a blanket of fine lights all shimmering and solid. I really wanted to write a farewell song to the 20th century...And nowhere seemed more perfect than the city that came into its own throughout the 20th century, but always looking forward and driven by ideas of a greater future, at whatever cost."

During R.E.M.'s performance on VH1 Storytellers, Stipe introduced the song by saying:

"I had a dentist in Los Angeles, who was also a dentist to Martin Sheen, and Martin Sheen was in the dentist's chair, getting his tooth drilled, when I went up to him and said, 'We have a record coming out in a couple of weeks and you're mentioned in one of the songs, and I just want you to know that it's honoring you; I don't want you to think that we're making fun of you.' And he was saying 'Thank you very much!'. He was very nice about it."

== Critical reception ==
Paul Lester from Melody Maker wrote that "the cello-plaintive" song was "fine". In a separate review, Melody Maker editor Everett True said: "This is R.E.M. sounding all melancholy, impassioned and dreary — as opposed to R.E.M. sounding all bouncy, jovial and irritating." Rolling Stone writer Mark Kemp called the song a "simple, folk-based pop song fueled by R.E.M.'s soothingly familiar guitar jangle".

== Track listing ==
All songs written by Bill Berry, Peter Buck, Mike Mills and Michael Stipe.

1. "Electrolite" – 4:05
2. "The Wake-Up Bomb" (Live) – 5:07
3. "Binky the Doormat" (Live) – 5:01
4. "King of Comedy" (808 State remix) – 5:36

The two live tracks were recorded at the Omni Coliseum in Atlanta on November 18, 1995.

== Personnel ==
R.E.M. performing "Electrolite" at the 1998 Rockpalast festival. Left to right: Mike Mills, Ken Stringfellow, Michael Stipe, Peter Buck, Joey Waronker, Scott McCaughey.

"Electrolite"

- Bill Berry – drums, percussion
- Peter Buck – bass guitar, banjo
- Andy Carlson – violin
- Nathan December – güiro
- Mike Mills – piano
- Michael Stipe – vocals

"The Wake-Up Bomb" (Live)

- Bill Berry – drums
- Peter Buck – guitar
- Nathan December – guitar
- Scott McCaughey – guitar, keyboards
- Mike Mills – bass guitar, vocals
- Michael Stipe – vocals

"Binky the Doormat" (Live)

- Bill Berry – drums
- Peter Buck – guitar
- Nathan December – guitar
- Scott McCaughey – guitar, keyboards
- Mike Mills – bass guitar, vocals
- Michael Stipe – vocals

"King of Comedy" (808 State Remix)

- Bill Berry – drums
- Peter Buck – guitar
- Sally Dworsky – background vocals
- Mike Mills – bass guitar, vocals
- Michael Stipe – vocals

== Charts ==
=== Weekly charts ===
Chart (1996–1997)	Peak position
Belgium (Ultratip Bubbling Under Flanders)	19
Canada Top Singles (RPM)	24
Finland (Suomen virallinen lista)	20
Germany (GfK)	83
Iceland (Íslenski Listinn Topp 40)	5
Netherlands (Single Top 100)	92
Scottish Singles Sales (Official Charts)	20
UK Singles (Official Charts)	29
US Billboard Hot 100	96
US Adult Alternative Airplay (Billboard)	5

=== Year-end charts ===
Chart (1997)	Position
Iceland (Íslenski Listinn Topp 40)	58

== Release history ==
"Electrolite" was released as a single on 7-inch and 12-inch vinyl, cassette, and two-track and maxi-CD singles. The 7-inch, cassette, and two-track CD releases only contain "Electrolite" and "The Wake-Up Bomb" (live).

Region	Date	Format(s)	Label(s)	Ref.
United Kingdom	December 2, 1996	2× CD; cassette	Warner Bros.	
United States	January 28, 1997	Contemporary hit radio	Warner Bros.	
Japan	February 10, 1997	Maxi-CD	Warner Bros.	
Japan	October 26, 1998	Maxi-CD (special edition)	Warner Bros.	

The song was included on R.E.M.'s Warner Brothers greatest-hits compilation In Time: The Best of R.E.M. 1988–2003. The music video appears on the accompanying DVD In View: The Best of R.E.M. 1988–2003.

The public debut of the song was performed by Mills and Stipe on June 8, 1997, in New York City for the Tibetan Freedom Concert and released on Tibetan Freedom Concert. Another version recorded on October 27, 1998 for Later with Jools Holland in the BBC Television Centre in London was released as a b-side to "Suspicion" with a recording of "Man on the Moon" from the same performance. The July 19, 2003 performance also appears on the Perfect Square DVD. A version recorded live in-studio at Clinton Studios in New York City on October 7, 2003 was included in the promotional disc A Joyful Noise – In Time with R.E.M.; the promo includes several other songs from that session. R.E.M.'s performance from their 2005 Dublin rehearsals was released on the live album Live at The Olympia and their 2008 performance from Austin City Limits appears on R.E.M. Live from Austin, TX.

== Cover versions ==
Radiohead have covered "Electrolite" live as an introduction to their song "Everything in Its Right Place".
