= Daysleeper =

Song by R.E.M

Single by R.E.M.

from the album Up
- B-side: "Emphysema"
- Released: October 12, 1998
- Genre: Alternative rock
- Length: 3:37
- Label: Warner Bros.
- Songwriters: Peter Buck; Mike Mills; Michael Stipe
- Producers: Pat McCarthy; R.E.M.

R.E.M. singles chronology
"How the West Was Won and Where It Got Us" (1997)	"Daysleeper" (1998)	"Lotus" (1998)

"Daysleeper" is a song by American alternative rock band R.E.M. It was released as the first single from their eleventh studio album Up on October 12, 1998. Sung from the point of view of a night shift worker corresponding with colleagues, "Daysleeper" focuses on the disorientation of time and circadian rhythm in such a lifestyle, leading to despair and loss of identity. Lead singer Michael Stipe developed the song's concept after noticing a sign reading "daysleeper" on a New York City apartment door.

== Background ==
During R.E.M.'s performance for VH1 Storytellers, Stipe explained the background to the song:

I was in New York, putting together a book of haikus that I worked on with several dear friends of mine over the course of a year, and I was walking down the steps of this building. It was probably four o'clock in the afternoon, and I come to a door—it's apartment 3-D or something—and there's a sign on it that says "Daysleeper," and I walked a lot more carefully, quietly down the steps, thinking about that poor person who's trying to sleep, and me and my big old boots interrupting her sleep. So I wrote this song about a daysleeper that's working an 11–7 shift and how furious the balance is between the life that you live and the work that you have to do in order to support the life that you live.

The song "The Lifting" from R.E.M.'s 2001 album Reveal is a prequel to "Daysleeper" and features the same character.

== Music video ==
The video, shot at Broadway Studios in the Astoria district of New York City in September 1998, was filmed in stop-frame photography to get what Stipe called a "really druggy, really great look." It features Stipe as the office worker who goes to work at night. All three band members then wear pajamas and bed socks, while failing to get to sleep during the day. The video was directed by the Icelandic Snorri brothers. "I think it's about the sort of alien nature of a night shift," explained Mike Mills. "The weird lighting, the fluorescent lights that you find and the isolation of working the graveyard shift—how it screws up your sleep patterns and that sort of thing, and I think that's the main image we're trying to get across."

== Track listings ==
All songs were written by Peter Buck, Mike Mills, and Michael Stipe.

- US 7-inch, CD, and cassette single

UK cassette single
European CD single

1. "Daysleeper" – 3:32
2. "Emphysema" – 4:21
- Canadian, Australian, and Japanese CD single
1. "Daysleeper" (single) – 3:31
2. "Emphysema" – 4:21
3. "Sad Professor" (live in the studio, Toast, San Francisco, California) – 3:59
4. "Why Not Smile" (Oxford American version) – 3:00
- UK CD single
1. "Daysleeper" – 3:31
2. "Emphysema" – 4:21
3. "Why Not Smile" (Oxford American version) – 3:00
- UK mini-CD single
1. "Daysleeper" (single edit) – 3:31
2. "Sad Professor" (live in the studio, Toast, San Francisco, California) – 3:59

== Charts ==
=== Weekly charts ===
Chart (1998)	Peak position
Australia (ARIA)	57
Austria (Ö3 Austria Top 40)	17
Belgium (Ultratip Bubbling Under Flanders)	9
Canada Top Singles (RPM)	5
Europe (Eurochart Hot 100)	27
Germany (GfK)	57
Iceland (Íslenski Listinn Topp 40)	1
Ireland (IRMA)	15
Italy Airplay (Music & Media)	9
Netherlands (Dutch Top 40 Tipparade)	15
Netherlands (Single Top 100)	64
New Zealand (Recorded Music NZ)	18
Norway (VG-lista)	12
Scottish Singles Sales (Official Charts)	7
Sweden (Sverigetopplistan)	46
Switzerland (Schweizer Hitparade)	49
UK Singles (Official Charts)	6
US Billboard Hot 100	57
US Adult Alternative Airplay (Billboard)	1
US Adult Pop Airplay (Billboard)	33
US Alternative Airplay (Billboard)	18
US Mainstream Rock (Billboard)	30

=== Year-end charts ===
Chart (1999)	Position
US Triple-A (Billboard)	30

== Release history ==
Region	Date	Format(s)	Label(s)	Ref.
Europe	September 1998	Radio	Warner Bros.	
United Kingdom	October 12, 1998	7-inch vinyl; CD; cassette	Warner Bros.	
United States	October 13, 1998	Contemporary hit radio	Warner Bros.	
Japan	October 26, 1998	CD	Warner Bros.	
