= Perfect Circle (song) =

1983 song by R.E.M.

Song by R.E.M.

from the album Murmur
- Released: April 12, 1983
- Studio: Reflection (Charlotte)
- Genre: Alternative rock
- Length: 3:29
- Label: I.R.S.
- Songwriter(s): Bill Berry; Peter Buck; Mike Mills; Michael Stipe
- Producer(s): Mitch Easter; Don Dixon

"Perfect Circle" is a song by American rock band R.E.M. and is the sixth track from their 1983 debut album Murmur.

== Music ==
Like many songs from Murmur, "Perfect Circle" has a sound typified by unusual instruments and recording techniques. The song opens with Honky tonk piano, a style more associated with ragtime and early country music than the college rock scene of which R.E.M. was a member. Two pianos were recorded, one played by Mike Mills and the other played by Bill Berry. The slightly out-of-sync sound and reverb created a detached otherworldly effect. The song also features Peter Buck's 12 string guitar.

After R.E.M.'s drummer Bill Berry left the band in 1997 for personal reasons, the band began reintroducing "Perfect Circle" into their live performances and radio appearances to promote their then forthcoming album Up. During this time period, members of the band stated that the song was primarily written by Berry and dedicated their performance of it to him.

== Lyrics ==
The lyrics of "Perfect Circle" are purposely opaque. Members of the band agree that the song has an emotional theme that can be interpreted in many ways. For guitarist Peter Buck, the song elicits images of children playing football one evening in Trenton, New Jersey. Singer Michael Stipe interprets the song as being about longing in a relationship. He also has stated that other interpretations are equally valid: "It was an intensely personal song to me. I really like that it can mean two different things. ... It's the exact same feeling, but the details are different."

== See also ==
- Imperfect Circle, a 2019 Hootie & the Blowfish album named after this song
