= Nathan December =

American musician

Nathan December is an American rock guitarist, best known for his work as a side musician with R.E.M. and the Goo Goo Dolls during the 1990s. He lives in Los Angeles, California.

== Music ==
December appeared in the 1994 film Reality Bites playing guitar in the band led by Troy, Ethan Hawke's character. Following a stint in the band Careless (which featured Minor Threat's Brian Baker and Mike Malinin, later of the Goo Goo Dolls), December toured with R.E.M. during the Monster tour in 1995 and played several instruments on the band's follow-up album, New Adventures in Hi-Fi, much of which was recorded live during sound checks and backstage performances during the Monster tour.

Around this time, he was a member of The Holy Bulls, which contributed a cover of Iggy Pop's "T.V. Eye" to the 1997 Pop tribute album We Will Fall. He also played guitar on Liz Phair's 1998 album whitechocolatespaceegg. From 1998 through 2000, December played with the Goo Goo Dolls, playing guitar and mandolin on the band's triple-platinum album Dizzy Up the Girl and the following tour. In 2000, he played on Liars Inc.'s second album, Enemy. In 2003-2004, he was the lead guitarist for the band Flupejac.

== Composer ==
December is also credited as a composer on songs recorded by Bijou Phillips, dc talk, Paul Thorn, and Maia Sharp.

== Post-musical career ==
During the 2000s, he switched careers, working as an electrician and lighting technician on a number of Hollywood films, such as Iron Man.
