= Bittersweet Me =

1996 single by R.E.M

Single by R.E.M.

from the album New Adventures in Hi-Fi
- B-side: "Undertow" (live)
- Released: October 21, 1996
- Length: 4:06
- Label: Warner Bros.
- Songwriters: Bill Berry; Peter Buck; Mike Mills; Michael Stipe
- Producers: Scott Litt; R.E.M.

R.E.M. singles chronology
"E-Bow the Letter" (1996)	"Bittersweet Me" (1996)	"Electrolite" (1997)

"Bittersweet Me" is a song by American rock band R.E.M., released in October 1996, by Warner Records, as the second single from their 10th studio album, New Adventures in Hi-Fi (1996). Like much of the album, the song originated while the band were on the road for the Monster tour, although the song was only ever soundchecked and has never been played live as part of a concert. The song was a bigger hit in the United States than the first single from the album, "E-Bow the Letter", except on the Modern Rock Tracks chart, where the first single's number-two peak bested the number-six peak of "Bittersweet Me". The song met a positive reception from music reviewers.

The CD single features a live cover of "Wichita Lineman", a song written by Jimmy Webb and made popular by Glen Campbell. The music video for the single was shot in the style of an Italian movie entitled Stanco E Nudo (a translation of the line "tired and naked" in the song). It was included as a bonus video on the DVD release of In View - The Best of R.E.M. 1988-2003.

== Promotion ==
In a contemporaneous (1996) article, music critic Jim DeRogatis considered the song as it related to the whole album: during a few days joining the band for interviews and to watch the production of the music video, he said the musicians wanted the album to be portrayed as "the record where R.E.M. proves that it's still got it." (Note: Jim DeRogatis wrote, "If you go back and look at the avalanche of press clippings that herald the release of every new R.E.M. album, you'll notice that a theme runs through all of them. The band members clearly decide what the emphasis of each new round of interviews will be, and they stick to the program and stress the same sound bites... Hence Green was portrayed across the board as 'the political record.' Out of Time was 'the experimental/orchestral record.' Automatic for the People was supposed to be 'the loud record,' but it turned out to be 'the quiet record.' Monster was 'the long-awaited loud record,' as well as 'the record where Michael Stipe talks about bisexuality but says he isn't HIV-positive.'") He added,

"I don't know what I'm hoping for," Stipe sings on tape and mouths onstage. "I don't know what I want anymore." More than anything the musicians will say in the current round of interviews, these lines seem to sum up where the group is at right now, as well as answering the questions that many fans are posing: After 18 years as a band, what is motivating the members of R.E.M. to continue? And, perhaps more importantly, has their incredible success boxed them into a corner where it's impossible for them to challenge themselves artistically?

When an advance copy of the English music magazine Mojo arrived the day before the "Bittersweet Me" video shoot began, its article suggested "that R.E.M.'s designated message circa the new album might not be delivered exactly as planned. The group was pictured on the cover in a typically enigmatic Anton Corbijn photo, but the cover line was 'R.E.M.: The Final Act?'" The band members received this angrily. Bass guitarist Mike Mills told DeRogatis, "It's just more journalists looking for an angle. Every bit of information they had in there was wrong. It's all anonymous sources and making things up."

== Music video ==
Jim DeRogatis described joining other journalists (including Chris Heath of Rolling Stone and novelist Bobbie Ann Mason) during the shoot: "Michael Stipe is doing something that he vowed he'd never do: He's lip-synching as R.E.M. films the clip for 'Bittersweet Me'... It's late July in Los Angeles, and the favorite sons of Athens, Georgia, are gathered on a small platform in the middle of a cavernous soundstage on the lot of A&M Studios." DeRogatis explains,

The "Bittersweet Me" video features R.E.M. performing in an empty movie theater while a bogus Italian art film in the style of La Dolce Vita is projected behind them. The fake '60s film scenes are taped on the second day of shooting at the Chapman Park Building, an ornate art deco structure in downtown Los Angeles that's doubling for an Italian villa. The movie stars actor Richard Edson, now a regular in the films of Jim Jarmusch but once the drummer for Sonic Youth. Director Dominic De Joseph spends the day filming Edson and various beautiful models in period fashions cavorting on the set.

Mason herself wrote in an article for The New York Times, "The band performs before an imagined backdrop, a trailer for a bad European movie, like Godard's Weekend if it were made for TV. They're wearing pseudo-Italian garb. Bill Berry, the drummer, wears a fish-net-covered black jacket. Peter Buck, the lead guitarist, has on a black suit with a loud yellow shirt, and Mike Mills, the bassist, is in a purple velvet suit. The lead singer Michael Stipe is in stripes. His head is shaved. He moves in little electric-shock jerks. It's an angry ecstasy."

Critic Stephan Wyatt, of the Albumism website, gave his appraisal in a review for the album's 25th anniversary:

The Italian film-inspired video, with the opening shot filled with English dubs and the song's lyrics as part of the dialogue is laughable at first and diminishes the song's strength, especially with Richard Edson, introduced to us in Ferris Bueller's Day Off as the caretaker of Cameron's father's car, the 1961 Ferrari 250 GT SWB California Spider, face elated as he and his partner catch air. Shot in the same style as many art house films during the '90s, it is curiously humorous, and at the same time bizarre. Little seriousness should be taken here, except the few scenes where Valeria Galino [i.e. Golino] is lying backwards on the couch and her middle-aged pursuer kneels down, looking directly into her eyes. Again, a bizarre, but tasteful and strangely touching moment graces the screen filled with other Italian movie tropes.

== Critical reception ==
Larry Flick from Billboard magazine described the song as "a strumming, easy-paced rocker that rings with the vintage R.E.M. sound—clever, mildly introspective verses that build to a full-throttle, pop-soaked chorus that permanently melts into the brain upon impact." He added, "It's a familiar formula that never seems to grow tired, mostly due to Michael Stipe's always believable, subtext-riddled vocals and tight instrumentation that sounds like it's unfolding live. Already connecting at rock radio, the single will gain top 40 approval within seconds."

Jim DeRogatis called it "a melancholy ballad in the mold of Automatic for the People." Reviewer John McFerrin gave the album a rating of 7/10 and said similarly that the song "does a good job of combining the mature sound of Automatic with ... grunge elements."

Reviewer Michael Lawrence, giving the album a rating of 10/10, enthused, "'Bittersweet Me' marks an excellent return to their more upbeat, poppy songs from the days of yore. The beat is bouncy and the harmonies are well developed. Helping it land a home run is the catchy Michael Stipe delivers on a silver platter of his mumbles!" In a more detailed review of the album's tracks, Lawrence gave the song an A and said, "What I especially like about this song is the harmonies, which are so good that they remind me of their good old 1980s albums! The atmosphere is nice and thick... it's thick and moody and they don't rely on any gimmicks such as distortion or that zippy noise from 'Leave.' There's that cheapish guitar that comes in for the chorus, but it actually serves to change the mood of the song instead of littering it up like it was in Monster. So, cool!"

== Legacy ==
In a 2011 retrospective, James Weiskittel, in his ranked list of 15 of R.E.M.'s studio albums for his website Generation Mixtape, placed New Adventures in Hi-Fi at #8 and considered "Bittersweet Me" a highlight. He called the song a "fuzz-drenched anthem" which "plays like a tighter/better version of 'Bang and Blame'" from the Monster album. Like many other critics, Weiskittel singled out the lines "I'd sooner chew my leg off than be trapped in this / How easy you think of all of this as bittersweet me," naming them his "Favorite Lyric and/or Moment" of the album. Trevor James Zaple argues that the music is, as the album title suggests, "a cleaner, bigger R.E.M. side that begins the lean towards adult contemporary sounds. Stipe leaves the mumble and mystique of his youth behind for good, finally projecting his voice," which "lends real weight" to "Bittersweet Me."

The album enjoyed further positive attention during the 25th anniversary of its release in 2021. Critics, in several retrospective reviews, compared the record with others by R.E.M. and considered how "Bittersweet Me" fit thematically into the album's production, in light of the facts that the band members had faced personal hardships and that it was recorded during their tours for the previous album, Monster.

Tim Peacock suggests that the theme of "eschewing the trappings of fame frequently recurred throughout New Adventures... with Stipe admitting, 'I'd rather chew my leg off than be trapped in this,' during the otherwise bracing 'Bittersweet Me." Kevin Korber of Spectrum Culture, praising the tonal diversity of the album, writes, "There are more crowd-pleasing songs, for sure: 'The Wake-Up Bomb' and 'So Fast, So Numb' hint at a version of Monster where the band focused on tight, punchy glam rock rather than sludgy guitar pedal workouts, and 'Bittersweet Me' is perhaps the perfect, archetypal R.E.M. song for this version of the band. That these songs all appear on the same album is one thing; that they coexist in the way that they do is something truly impressive."

A reviewer for Sputnik Music, calling it a "great" album, writes that "'The Wake Up Bomb' and 'Bittersweet Me', while nothing especially crazy, are also enjoyable rockers and worth holding onto. 'Bittersweet Me' in particular boasts some classic R.E.M. jangle in its verses and some very satisfying guitar crunch in its choruses." Stephen Thomas Erlewine likewise thought the song sounded like early R.E.M., saying that "the chiming opening riff of 'Bittersweet Me' sounds like it was written in 1985." Ruck Cohlchez calls the song "a hooky single," and points to the lyric "I'd sooner chew my leg off than be trapped in this" as an example of the energy but also "the ambivalence of touring and the exhaustion, that show up throughout the album."

Stephan Wyatt of Albumism considers the lyrics intriguing:

The longest album in the band's 15-album legacy also presented the world with the band's most poignant love song. "Bittersweet Me" depicts love's despair and exit with cinematic flair. Buck's lithe guitar melody manufactures the melancholy set for Stipe's end scene: "I move across / innocence lost / All flashing pulsar / I move across the earth in my new pattern shirt / I pass satellites." Esoteric? Certainly. A touchstone that also shaped the band's identity, Stipe's lyrics puzzled and were left for whoever encountered the strange verses anyway they would like. The song's twist, hung in organ lines subtly heavy at moments and lighter during others, comes during the pre-chorus when Stipe croons, "I'd sooner chew my leg off / Than to be trapped in this," punching through the misery with the chorus leaving the moment—and relationship—with stern certainty.

== Track listings ==
All songs were written by Berry, Buck, Mills, and Stipe unless otherwise indicated.

- 7-inch, cassette, and CD single
1. "Bittersweet Me" – 4:06
2. "Undertow" (live)^{2} – 5:05
- 12-inch and CD maxi-single
1. "Bittersweet Me" – 4:06
2. "Undertow" (live)^{1} – 5:05
3. "Wichita Lineman" (Webb) (live)^{2} – 3:18
4. "New Test Leper" (live acoustic)^{3} – 5:29

=== Notes ===
^{1} Recorded at the Omni Theater, Atlanta, Georgia; November 18, 1995. Taken from the live performance video, Road Movie.
^{2} Recorded at The Woodlands, Houston, Texas; September 15, 1995.
^{3} Recorded at Bad Animals Studio, Seattle, Washington; April 19, 1996.

== Personnel ==
- Bill Berry – drums, tambourine
- Peter Buck – guitar
- Mike Mills – bass, organ, Mellotron
- Michael Stipe – vocals
- Scott McCaughey – piano

== Charts ==
=== Weekly charts ===
Chart (1996–1997)	Peak position
Australia (ARIA)	90
Canada Top Singles (RPM)	6
Canada Adult Contemporary (RPM)	42
Canada Rock/Alternative (RPM)	11
Europe (Eurochart Hot 100)	92
Germany (GfK)	93
Iceland (Íslenski Listinn Topp 40)	5
Ireland (IRMA)	20
Scottish Singles Sales (Official Charts)	14
UK Singles (Official Charts)	19
US Billboard Hot 100	46
US Adult Alternative Airplay (Billboard)	1
US Alternative Airplay (Billboard)	6
US Mainstream Rock (Billboard)	7
US Pop Airplay (Billboard)	28

=== Year-end charts ===
Chart (1996)	Position
US Mainstream Rock Tracks (Billboard)	83
US Modern Rock Tracks (Billboard)	83

Chart (1997)	Position
Canada Top Singles (RPM)	75
Iceland (Íslenski Listinn Topp 40)	59
US Mainstream Rock Tracks (Billboard)	75
US Modern Rock Tracks (Billboard)	97
US Triple-A (Billboard)	38

== Release history ==
Region	Date	Format(s)	Label(s)	Ref.
United States	October 8, 1996	Contemporary hit radio	Warner Bros.	
United Kingdom	October 21, 1996	CD; cassette	Warner Bros.	
Japan	December 11, 1996	CD	Warner Bros.	
