= At My Most Beautiful =

Song by R.E.M

Single by R.E.M.

from the album Up
- B-side: "The Passenger" (live); "Country Feedback" (live); "So. Central Rain" (live)
- Released: March 8, 1999
- Recorded: 1998
- Genre: Baroque pop
- Length: 3:35
- Label: Warner Bros.
- Songwriters: Peter Buck; Mike Mills; Michael Stipe
- Producers: Pat McCarthy; R.E.M.

R.E.M. singles chronology
"Lotus" (1998)	"At My Most Beautiful" (1999)	"Suspicion" (1999)

"At My Most Beautiful" is a song by the American alternative rock band R.E.M. During the song's creation, members of the group noted its similarity to the work of the Beach Boys and purposefully fashioned it to resemble that band's output. Singer Michael Stipe strove to make his lyrics the most romantic he had ever written, and the piano-driven ballad became R.E.M.'s first straightforward love song. Released on the group's 1998 album Up, it was issued as the third single from that record the following year, reaching number 10 on the UK Singles Chart.

== Origin and recording ==
R.E.M. bassist Mike Mills stated that after he composed the piano part to "At My Most Beautiful", he felt it sounded like music the Beach Boys' Brian Wilson would have written two decades prior. Once guitarist Peter Buck received the basic tracks of the song from Mills, he too found the music reminiscent of Wilson. Instead of avoiding the comparisons, the group instead opted to "[run] toward it", in Mills' words.

"The idea for it happened driving up and down Santa Monica Boulevard in Los Angeles when I was putting together the Patti Smith book [Two Times Intro: On the Road with Patti Smith] last year," Stipe said in 1998. "I had CDs and tape of new songs in the car. I came up with this one line, 'I found a way to make you smile.' All I knew was The Beach Boys had a record or a song called Smile – is that right? – so I was like, 'Well, this will be my gift to [bandmates and Beach Boys fans] Peter and Mike, and Bill at the time. It was hard to write. It was a high order to say, 'I found a way to make you smile.' I had to come up with, 'OK, what are those ways?' That was tough." Of the line, 'I found a way to make you smile', Stipe later recalled, "I just thought, that's the most beautiful thing in the world."

Stipe had difficulty writing lyrics for the Up album. In the case of "At My Most Beautiful", it took the singer a year to write the song's verse because he needed to figure out what one could do to prompt the action described in the opening line. The solution finally occurred to him one morning, and he finished writing the words in 45 minutes. After a conversation with Patti Smith, Stipe was convinced that he needed to be fearless in his songwriting approach. In regards to "At My Most Beautiful", he had grown tired writing ironic love songs and consequently endeavored to create "the most romantic song I'd ever written".

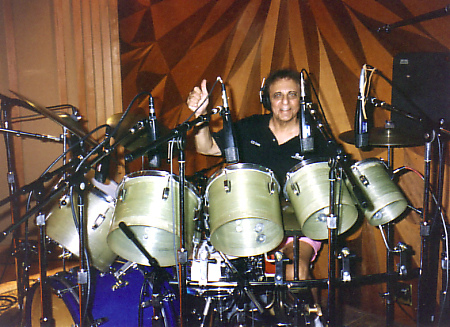
"At My Most Beautiful" was written as a pop ballad in the style of 1960s musicians such as Brian Wilson and Hal Blaine (pictured)

Following the departure of drummer and founding member Bill Berry, the dynamic of the band changed. Buck performed drums on the song; though he admitted he was not adept at playing the instrument, he stated his skill level was sufficient to perform what he referred to as the "Hal Blaine-ish" fills heard on the recording. During the final stages of production for Up in 1998, two days—June 21 and 22—were used to perform audio mixing on the song.

== Composition and lyrics ==
"At My Most Beautiful" is performed in the key of F major. There are several main chord progressions in the song: the introduction is Fmaj7–D–G minor, while the verse follows a I–III–IV–II chord sequence and the chorus ascends using a II–III–IV–V progression. In the mix, tubular and sleigh bells are heard in the right channel (with their reverberation reaching into the left), piano and bass guitar (both played in quarter note patterns) as well as bass harmonica are heard in the left, and guitar and Mike Mills' backing vocals are centered. Additional instrumentation includes organ in the chorus and cellos in the song's coda. The notes Michael Stipe sings are typical of the vocalist, focusing on the first, third, and fourth notes of the scale he's performing.

"At My Most Beautiful" was written as a "gift" from Stipe to his bandmates, to indulge their fondness of Pet Sounds. Commenting on the song's musical similarities to the work of the Beach Boys in his book Inside Classic Rock Tracks, Rikki Rooksby wrote that "At My Most Beautiful" was "a tribute to that sound, at once conveying something of R.E.M. and Brian Wilson. In other words, it's not so much like The Beach Boys that it's a pastiche, but sufficiently like them to be a musical homage." He states that the song's use of an F chord with an A bass note in the verse follows the example of Brian Wilson's use of inversions on his band's Pet Sounds album, and that the cellos at the end heightens the section's resemblance to the Beach Boys' "Good Vibrations".

In addition to being its first tribute song, "At My Most Beautiful" was also R.E.M.'s first straightforward love song. The lyrics reference leaving messages on a love interest's answering machine and what Rooksby terms "knowing obsession". He states that the song is about "the ennobling effect of love, yet is aware of its playful narcissism".

== Release and promotion ==
"At My Most Beautiful" was released as the third single from Up in early 1999. That February, R.E.M. performed "At My Most Beautiful" for an episode of Party of Five, a television series which had included music by the band in the past; the show's producers determined the choice of song to be featured in the program. The single's promotional video was directed by Nigel Dick. The clip follows a cellist (portrayed by Rain Phoenix) experiencing a "bad day" on her way to an audition overseen by Buck, Mills, and Stipe. R.E.M. biographer David Buckley praised the narrative promo as one of the band's best. Though the song was a moderate hit, its success failed to stimulate sales of Up, which by 1999 had sold a relatively low three million copies worldwide.

== Track listing ==
All songs were written by Peter Buck, Mike Mills, and Michael Stipe unless otherwise indicated.

CD

1. "At My Most Beautiful" (Radio Remix)
2. "The Passenger" (live, Later with Jools Holland – BBC Radio Theatre, London) (Iggy Pop)
3. "Country Feedback" (live, Later with Jools Holland – BBC Radio Theatre, London) (Bill Berry, Buck, Mills, and Stipe)

UK CD single

1. "At My Most Beautiful" (live, BBC Radio 1, October 25, 1998)
2. "So. Central Rain (I'm Sorry)" (live, Later with Jools Holland – BBC Radio Theatre, London) (Berry, Buck, Mills, and Stipe)

== Charts ==
Weekly chart performance for "At My Most Beautiful"
Chart (1999)	Peak position
Europe (Eurochart Hot 100)	39
Ireland (IRMA)	28
Scotland Singles (Official Charts)	9
UK Singles (Official Charts)	10
US Adult Alternative Top 30 (Radio & Records)	19

== Release history ==
Release dates and formats for "At My Most Beautiful"
Region	Date	Format(s)	Label	Ref.
United Kingdom	March 8, 1999	CD; cassette	Warner Bros.	
Japan	March 10, 1999	CD	Warner Bros.	
United States	April 20, 1999	Radio	Warner Bros.	

== Bibliography ==
- Black, Johnny. Reveal: The Story of R.E.M. Backbeat, 2004. ISBN 0-87930-776-5
- Buckley, David. R.E.M.: Fiction: An Alternative Biography. Virgin, 2002. ISBN 1-85227-927-3
- Fletcher, Tony. Remarks Remade – The Story of R.E.M. Omnibus Press, 2002. ISBN 0-7119-9113-8
- Rooksby, Rikki. Inside Classic Rock Tracks. Backbeat, 2001. ISBN 0-87930-654-8
