= EBow =

Electronic device for playing guitar

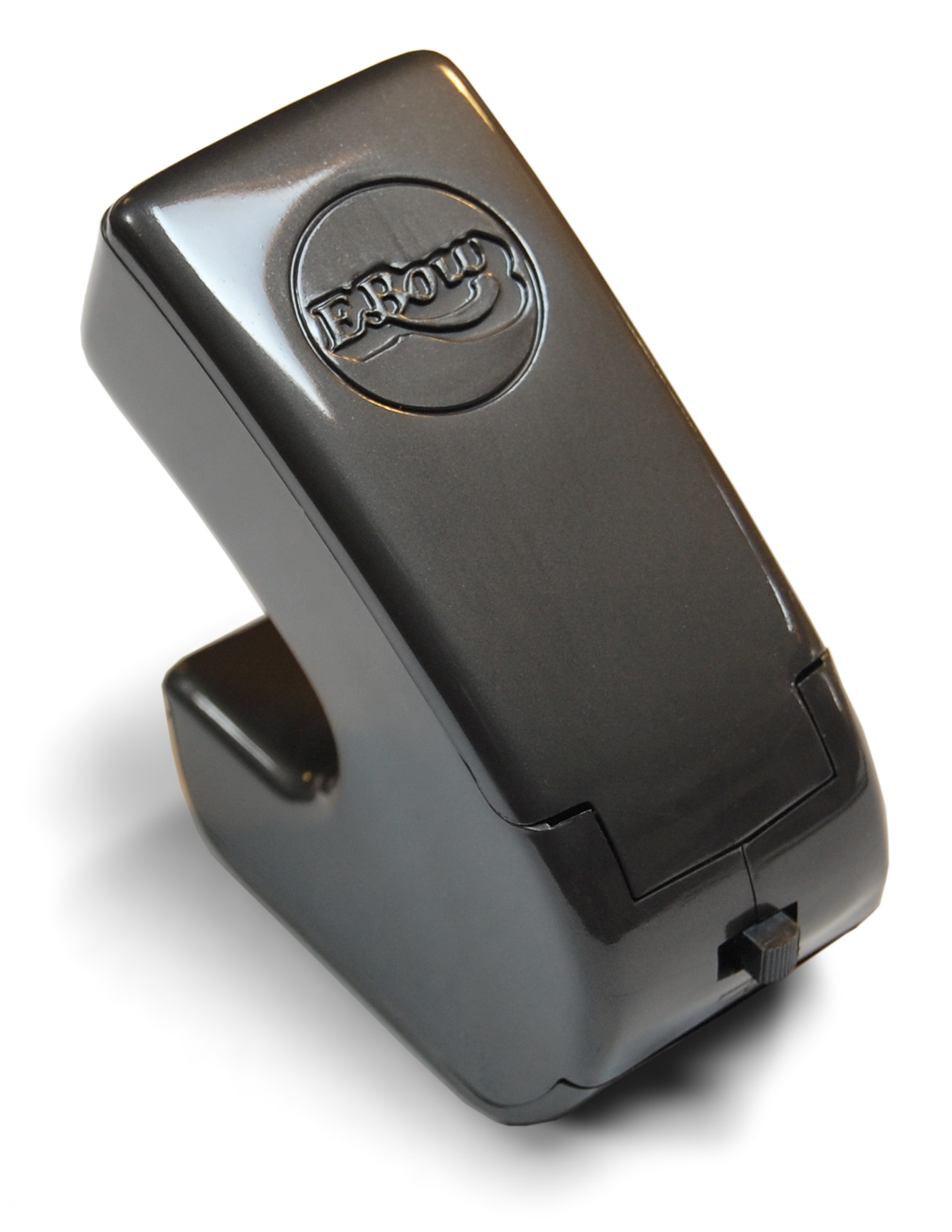
An EBow

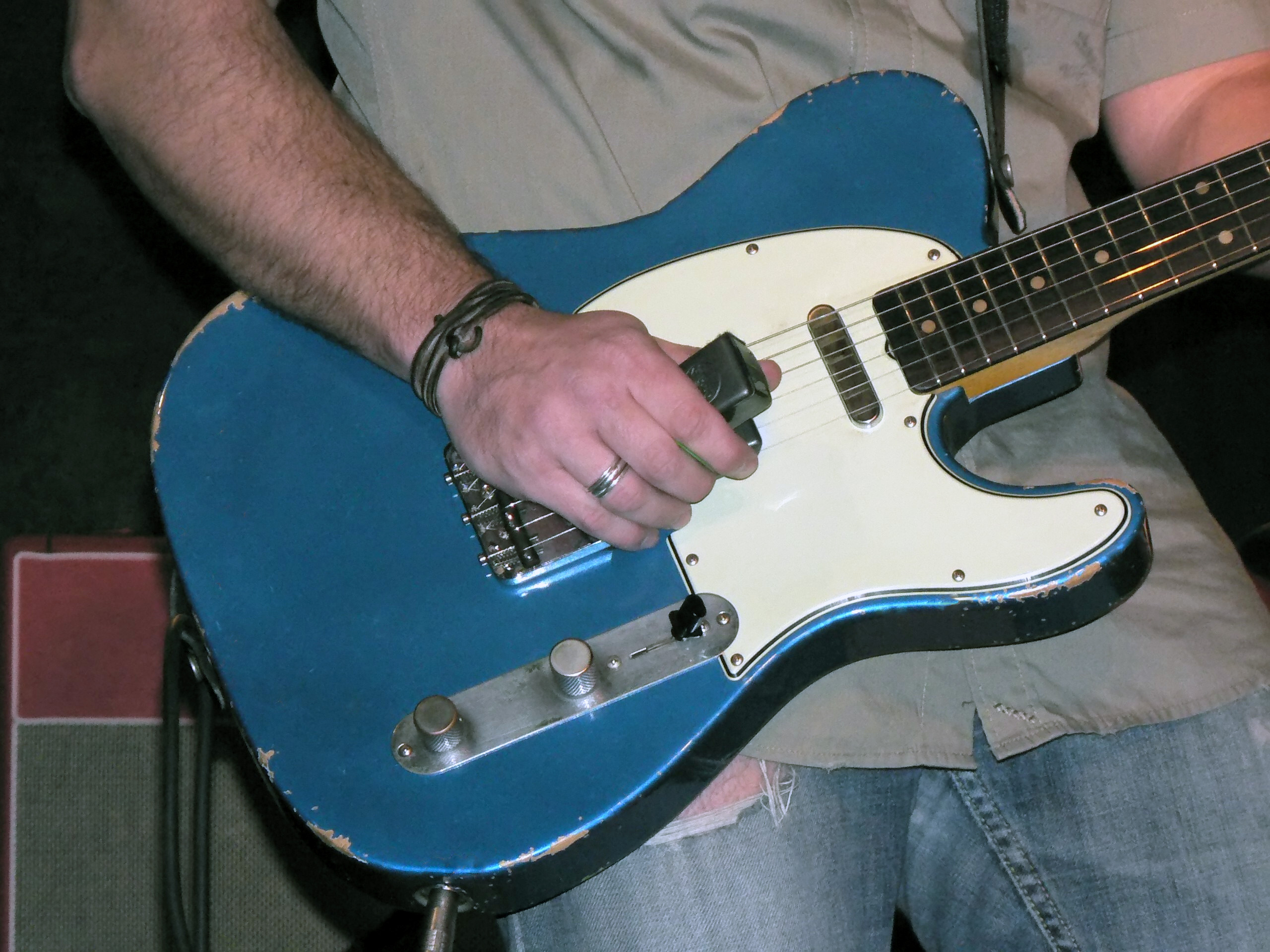
Using an EBow with a Telecaster

The EBow is an electronic device used for playing string instruments, most often the electric guitar. It was invented by the American guitarist Greg Heet in 1969 and introduced in 1976. The EBow uses a pickup and a magnetic feedback circuit to vibrate strings without touching them, allowing players to sustain notes indefinitely.

== History ==
The EBow was invented in 1969 by the American guitarist Greg Heet and introduced in 1976 at the NAMM trade show. It has remained in continuous production since. The first version was activated by plucking the guitar string. The second, introduced in 1983, added an on/off switch and a more powerful drive. The third, introduced in 1989, had improved sensitivity and faster attack. The EBow Plus, introduced in 1998, adds a blue LED and a switch to allow users to move between normal and harmonic modes (which sounds one octave higher). The EBow is powered by a nine-volt battery.

== Function ==
The EBow uses a pickup and a magnetic feedback circuit to vibrate strings without touching them. Whereas guitars traditionally have fast attack and slow release, meaning notes ring immediately and then fade out, the EBow can sustain notes indefinitely and gives greater control over attack and decay. The EBow can only play one string at a time, but can be moved across the strings to play arpeggios. It can produce sounds similar to cello or violin.

== Use ==
The EBow was particularly popular in 1980s music, used by acts such as Big Country, Tones on Tail, Love and Rockets and Bill Nelson. The Love and Rockets guitarist Daniel Ash said the EBow "changed everything for me ... [It] basically turns the guitar into a keyboard ... It completely opened up the sound of the guitar."

The EBow has been used to create background textures or sustained notes similar to guitar feedback, as in "(Don't Fear) The Reaper" (1976) by Blue Öyster Cult and "Heaven Beside You" (1996) by Alice in Chains. It was used by the U2 guitarist the Edge on the 1984 album The Unforgettable Fire and by Noel Gallagher on the 1996 Oasis song "Don't Look Back in Anger". Though Robert Fripp did not use an EBow on the studio version of the 1977 David Bowie song "'Heroes'", many guitarists have used one to replicate the sound in live performances. R.E.M. used the EBow extensively on their 1996 single "E-Bow the Letter".

The EBow was prominently used by the Siouxsie and the Banshees guitarist John McGeoch on "Sin in My Heart", from the 1981 album Juju. The EBow is used by the Radiohead guitarist Ed O'Brien for performances of songs such as "My Iron Lung", "Talk Show Host", "Jigsaw Falling Into Place", "Where I End and You Begin" and "Nude". Other users include Duran Duran, the Red Hot Chili Peppers, Van Halen, Metallica and the Foo Fighters. The Canadian-American ambient rock band Vision Eternel uses an EBow on nearly all their songs.
