= How the West Was Won and Where It Got Us =

Song by R.E.M

Single by R.E.M.

from the album New Adventures in Hi-Fi
- B-side: "Be Mine" (Mike on the Bus Version)
- Released: 1997
- Studio: Bad Animals, Seattle, Washington
- Genre: Folk-pop
- Length: 4:31
- Label: Warner Bros.
- Songwriters: Bill Berry; Peter Buck; Mike Mills; Michael Stipe
- Producers: Scott Litt; R.E.M.

R.E.M. singles chronology
"Electrolite" (1997)	"How the West Was Won and Where It Got Us" (1997)	"Daysleeper" (1998)

"How the West Was Won and Where It Got Us" is a song by R.E.M. released as the fourth and final single from their tenth studio album New Adventures in Hi-Fi in 1997. It was released in Germany and Japan and was the final R.E.M. single and music video to feature Bill Berry until "#9 Dream" in 2007.

The primary B-side was an alternate recording of "Be Mine". Other B-sides for the maxi-single include a cover of The Troggs' "Love Is All Around," previously released on the soundtrack for I Shot Andy Warhol (1996) and Vic Chesnutt's "Sponge", previously released on the Chesnutt benefit album Sweet Relief II (1996). The track was performed live only throughout various shows during promotion of Up in 1998 and 1999.

== Track listing ==
All songs were written by Bill Berry, Peter Buck, Mike Mills, and Michael Stipe unless otherwise indicated.

1. "How the West Was Won and Where It Got Us" – 4:30
2. "Be Mine" (Mike on the Bus version) – 4:54
3. "Love Is All Around" (Reg Presley) – 3:04
4. "Sponge" (Vic Chesnutt) – 4:08

== Personnel ==
"How the West Was Won and Where It Got Us"

- Bill Berry – drums, tambourine, Ennio whistle
- Peter Buck – bass guitar, guitar, bouzouki, mandolin
- Mike Mills – piano, synthesizer, backing vocals
- Michael Stipe – vocals, synthesizer
