= This Film Is On =

1991 video release by R.E.M.

This Film is On

Video by R.E.M.
- Released: September 24, 1991
- Genre: Alternative rock
- Label: Warner Bros.

R.E.M. chronology
Out of Time (1991)	This Film is On (1991)	The Best of R.E.M. (1991)

R.E.M. video chronology
Tourfilm (1990)	This Film Is On (1991)	Parallel (1995)

This Film Is On is a video feature compiling all of R.E.M.'s Out of Time-era promotional videos, as well as several recorded for this release alone. It was released on video on September 24, 1991, and on DVD format on August 22, 2000, both on the Warner Bros. label. The title is a line from the song, "Country Feedback".

The 50-minute release features promotional videos to the band's four singles from Out of Time ("Losing My Religion", "Shiny Happy People", "Near Wild Heaven" and "Radio Song") in addition to videos to the album tracks "Low", "Belong", "Half a World Away" and "Country Feedback"; an acoustic performance of "Losing My Religion" from The Late Show; and a live acoustic performance of "Love Is All Around" from MTV Unplugged. Also included is "Endgame", an instrumental track, played over the feature's credits; and several avant-garde clips, ranging from ten seconds to one minute, playing in between each song. This incidental footage was directed by Michael Stipe.

There are no bonus features on the DVD; however there is an optional lyrics subtitle track. Audio on the DVD-5 is PCM Stereo.

== Track listing ==
All music tracks written by Bill Berry, Peter Buck, Mike Mills and Michael Stipe except where noted. Directors are in parentheses.

1. Intro
2. "Losing My Religion" (Tarsem Singh)
3. "Shiny Happy People" (Katherine Dieckmann) (choreographer: Diane Martel) (feat. Kate Pierson)
4. "Near Wild Heaven" (Jeff Preiss)
5. "Radio Song" (Peter Care) (feat. KRS-One)
6. "Love Is All Around" (live acoustic on MTV Unplugged) (Milton Lage) (song written by Reg Presley)
7. "Losing My Religion" (live acoustic on The Late Show) (Sharon Maguire)
8. "Low" (James Herbert)
9. "Belong" (live during the Green World Tour) (Jem Cohen)
10. "Half a World Away" (Jim McKay) (actor: Tom Gilroy)
11. "Country Feedback" (Jem Cohen)
12. Credits (featuring "Endgame")
