= Live at the Borderline 1991 =

Live album by Bingo Hand Job
- Released: April 13, 2019
- Recorded: March 15, 1991
- Venues: The Borderline Club, London, England, UK
- Genre: Alternative rock
- Label: Craft

R.E.M. chronology
R.E.M. at the BBC (2018)	Live at the Borderline 1991 (2019)

Live at the Borderline 1991 is a live album released for Record Store Day on April 13, 2019. The recording features alternative rock band R.E.M. performing under the pseudonym Bingo Hand Job at a 1991 surprise gig around the release of Out of Time.

== Recording and release ==
The band played two nights at the 200-capacity London venue (March 14–15, 1991) as part of a small promotional tour of radio and television programmes; tickets were reportedly exchanging hands for $200 (equivalent to $473 in 2025) and the gigs were widely bootlegged at the time. This is the first official release.

Members of R.E.M. were joined by Billy Bragg, Peter Holsapple and Robyn Hitchcock, who also adopted pseudonyms.

The official release was preceded by a free NoiseTrade download of "Radio Song".

Several of the songs had been released as B-sides on singles such as "Near Wild Heaven".

== Track listing ==
All songs written by Bill Berry, Peter Buck, Mike Mills, and Michael Stipe, except where noted.

Side A

1. "World Leader Pretend" – 4:47
2. "Half a World Away" – 3:56
3. "Fretless" – 5:46
4. "The One I Love" – 3:40

Side B

1. "Jackson" / "Dallas" (Jerry Leiber and Billy Edd Wheeler/Jimmie Dale Gilmore) – 5:32
2. "Disturbance at the Heron House" – 3:53
3. "Belong" – 4:46
4. "Low" – 5:10

Side C

1. "Love Is All Around" (Reg Presley) – 4:07
2. "You Are the Everything" – 4:22
3. "Swan Swan H" – 3:03
4. "Radio Song" – 4:56
5. "Perfect Circle" – 4:38

Side D

1. "Endgame" – 4:04
2. "Pop Song 89" – 3:27
3. "Losing My Religion" – 5:20
4. "Fall on Me" – 3:31
5. "Get Up" – 3:09
6. "Moon River" (Henry Mancini and Johnny Mercer) – 2:33

== Personnel ==
Bingo Hand Job

- Bill "The Doc" Berry – drums
- Peter "Raoul" Buck – guitar, mandolin
- Mike "Ophelia" Mills – bass guitar, backing vocals
- Michael "Stinky" Stipe – vocals

Additional musicians

- Billy "Conrad" Bragg – guitar, vocals on "Jackson", "Dallas", "Disturbance at the Heron House", and "Fall on Me"
- Peter "Spanish Charlie" Holsapple – guitar, mandolin, backing vocals
- Robyn "Violet" Hitchcock – vocals

Technical personnel

- Spencer Kelly – project assistance
- Tony McGuinness – project assistance
- Doug Schwartz – editing and mastering at Mulholland Music

== Chart performance ==
Live at the Borderline 1991 spent one week on the Billboard Top Album Sales chart at 83rd place.
