= List of awards and nominations received by R.E.M. =

This is a comprehensive list of major music awards received by R.E.M., an American rock band from Athens, Georgia, formed in 1980 by drummer Bill Berry, guitarist Peter Buck, bassist Mike Mills, and lead vocalist Michael Stipe who were students at the University of Georgia. One of the first alternative rock bands, R.E.M. was noted for Buck's ringing, arpeggiated guitar style; Stipe's distinctive vocal quality, unique stage presence, and obscure lyrics; Mills's melodic basslines and backing vocals; and Berry's tight, economical drumming style. In the early 1990s, other alternative rock acts such as Nirvana and Pavement viewed R.E.M. as a pioneer of the genre. After drummer Bill Berry left the band in 1997, the band continued its career in the 2000s with mixed critical and commercial success. The band broke up amicably in 2011 with members devoting time to solo projects after having sold more than 90 million albums worldwide and becoming one of the world's best-selling music artists.

== American Music Awards ==
Year	Nominee / work	Award	Result
1992	Out of Time	Favorite Pop/Rock Album	Nominated

== BMI Pop Awards ==
Year	Nominee / work	Award	Result	Ref.
1996	"Bang and Blame"	Award-Winning Songs	Won	
1996	"What's the Frequency, Kenneth?"	Award-Winning Songs	Won	
1996	"What's the Frequency, Kenneth?"	College Song of the Year	Won	
2001	"The Great Beyond"	Award-Winning Song	Won	

== Billboard Music Awards ==
Year	Nominee / work	Award	Result
1991	Out of Time	Top Billboard 200 Album	Won
1991	R.E.M.	Top Modern Rock Artist	Won

== Brit Awards ==
Year	Nominee / work	Award	Result
1992	R.E.M.	International Group	Won
1993	R.E.M.	International Group	Won
1995	R.E.M.	International Group	Won
1997	R.E.M.	International Group	Nominated
1999	R.E.M.	International Group	Nominated
2002	R.E.M.	International Group	Nominated

== CMJ New Music Awards ==
Year	Nominee / work	Award	Result
1984	Reckoning	Album of the Year	Won
1985	Fables of the Reconstruction	Album of the Year	Won
1985	R.E.M.	Group of the Year	Nominated

== Danish GAFFA Awards ==
Year	Nominee / work	Award	Result	Ref.
1992	R.E.M.	Band of the Year	Nominated	
1992	Out of Time	Album of the Year	Nominated	
1992	"Losing My Religion"	Song of the Year	Nominated	
1992	"Losing My Religion"	Music Video of the Year	Nominated	
1993	"Drive"	Music Video of the Year	Nominated	
1993	"Drive"	Song of the Year	Won	
1993	Automatic for the People	Album of the Year	Won	
1993	R.E.M.	Band of the Year	Won	
1995	Monster	Best Foreign Album	Nominated	
1996	New Adventures in Hi-Fi	Best Foreign Album	Nominated	
1996	R.E.M.	Best Foreign Live Band	Nominated	
1996	R.E.M.	Best Foreign Band	Nominated	
1999	R.E.M.	Best Foreign Band	Won	
1999	Up	Best Foreign Album	Won	
1999	Michael Stipe	Best Foreign Songwriter	Nominated	
2000	R.E.M.	Best Foreign Live Act	Nominated	
2000	R.E.M.	Best Foreign 90's Act	Won	
2002	R.E.M.	Best Foreign Band	Nominated	
2002	Reveal	Best Foreign Album	Nominated	
2002	Michael Stipe	Best Foreign Songwriter	Nominated	
2005	Michael Stipe	Best Foreign Songwriter	Nominated	
2005	R.E.M.	Best Foreign Album	Nominated	
2005	Around the Sun	Best Foreign Album	Nominated	

== Danish Music Awards ==
Year	Nominee / work	Award	Result	Ref.
1999	Michael Stipe	Best Foreign Male Artist	Nominated	
1999	"Daysleeper"	Best Foreign Hit	Nominated	
1999	Up	Best Foreign Album	Nominated	
2002	Reveal	Best Foreign Album	Won	

== ECHO Awards ==
Year	Nominee / work	Award	Result
1992	R.E.M.	Best International Group	Nominated
2002	R.E.M.	Best International Group	Nominated
2005	R.E.M.	Best International Group	Nominated
2009	R.E.M.	Best International Group	Nominated

== Grammy Awards ==
Year	Nominee / work	Award	Result
1991	"Losing My Religion"	Record of the Year	Nominated
1991	"Losing My Religion"	Song of the Year	Nominated
1991	"Losing My Religion"	Best Pop Performance by a Duo or Group with Vocals	Won
1991	"Losing My Religion"	Best Music Video, Short Form	Won
1991	"Radio Song"	Best Rock Performance by a Duo or Group with Vocal	Nominated
1991	Out of Time	Best Alternative Music Album	Won
1991	Out of Time	Album of the Year	Nominated
1994	"Man on the Moon"	Best Pop Performance by a Duo or Group with Vocals	Nominated
1994	"Everybody Hurts"	Best Music Video, Short Form	Nominated
1994	Automatic for the People	Best Alternative Music Album	Nominated
1994	Automatic for the People	Album of the Year	Nominated
1995	Monster	Best Rock Album	Nominated
1997	New Adventures in Hi-Fi	Best Alternative Music Album	Nominated
2001	"The Great Beyond"	Best Song Written for a Motion Picture, Television or Other Visual Media	Nominated
2002	"Imitation of Life"	Best Pop Performance by a Duo or Group with Vocals	Nominated

== MTV Europe Music Awards ==
Year	Nominee / work	Award	Result
1995	R.E.M.	Best Live Act	Nominated
2001	R.E.M.	Best Group	Nominated

== MTV Video Music Awards ==
Year	Nominee / work	Award	Result
1988	"The One I Love"	Best Direction	Nominated
1989	"Orange Crush"	Best Post-Modern Video	Won
1991	"Losing My Religion"	Video of the Year	Won
1991	"Losing My Religion"	Best Group Video	Won
1991	"Losing My Religion"	Breakthrough Video	Won
1991	"Losing My Religion"	Best Direction	Won
1991	"Losing My Religion"	Best Art Direction	Won
1991	"Losing My Religion"	Best Editing	Won
1991	"Losing My Religion"	Best Alternative Video	Nominated
1991	"Losing My Religion"	Best Cinematography	Nominated
1991	"Losing My Religion"	Viewer's Choice	Nominated
1991	Tourfilm	Best Long Form Video	Nominated
1993	"Man on the Moon"	Video of the Year	Nominated
1993	"Man on the Moon"	Best Group Video	Nominated
1993	"Man on the Moon"	Best Direction	Nominated
1993	"Man on the Moon"	Best Art Direction	Nominated
1993	"Man on the Moon"	Best Editing	Nominated
1993	"Man on the Moon"	Viewer's Choice	Nominated
1994	"Everybody Hurts"	Video of the Year	Nominated
1994	"Everybody Hurts"	Best Group Video	Nominated
1994	"Everybody Hurts"	Viewer's Choice	Nominated
1994	"Everybody Hurts"	Breakthrough Video	Won
1994	"Everybody Hurts"	Best Direction	Won
1994	"Everybody Hurts"	Best Editing	Won
1994	"Everybody Hurts"	Best Cinematography	Won
1995	R.E.M.	Michael Jackson Video Vanguard Award	Won
1995	"What's the Frequency, Kenneth?"	Viewer's Choice	Nominated
1996	"Tongue"	Best Art Direction	Nominated
2000	"The Great Beyond"	Best Video from a Film	Nominated
2000	"The Great Beyond"	Best Editing	Nominated
2001	"Imitation of Life"	Breakthrough Video	Nominated
2001	"Imitation of Life"	Best Direction	Nominated

== Meteor Music Awards ==
Year	Nominee / work	Award	Result
2005	R.E.M.	Best International Group	Nominated

== NME Awards ==
Year	Nominee / work	Award	Result
1988	Green	Best LP	Won
1991	R.E.M.	Best Band	Won
1992	R.E.M.	Best Band	Won
1992	Automatic for the People	Best Album	Won
1996	R.E.M.	Best Band	Nominated
2017	Out of Time	Best Reissue	Nominated

== Online Film & Television Association ==
Year	Nominee / work	Award	Result
1999	"Man on the Moon"	Best Adapted Song	Nominated

== Pollstar Concert Industry Awards ==
Year	Nominee / work	Award	Result
1988	Work Tour	Small Hall Tour of the Year	Nominated
1988	Themselves	Next Major Arena Headliner	Won
1996	Monster Tour	Major Tour of the Year	Nominated
1996	Monster Tour	Most Creative Stage Production	Nominated
2000	Up Tour	Most Creative Stage Production	Nominated

Premios Ondas

Year	Nominee / work	Award	Result	Ref.
1992	R.E.M.	Best International Group	Won	
1992	"Drive"	Best International Song	Won	

== Q Awards ==
Year	Nominee / work	Award	Result
1991	Out of Time	Best Album	Won
1991	R.E.M.	Best Act in the World Today	Won
1992	Automatic for the People	Best Album	Won
1994	R.E.M.	Best Act in the World Today	Won
1995	R.E.M.	Best Act in the World Today	Won
1998	R.E.M.	Q Lifetime Achievement Award	Won
1999	R.E.M.	Best Act in the World Today	Nominated
2001	R.E.M.	Best Act in the World Today	Nominated
2011	R.E.M.	Q's Greatest Act of the Last 25 Years	Nominated

== Rockbjornen ==
Year	Nominee / work	Award	Result
1994	R.E.M.	Best Foreign Artist	Won
1994	R.E.M.	Best Foreign Group	Won
1994	Monster	Best Foreign Album	Won

== World Music Awards ==
Year	Nominee / work	Award	Result
2008	R.E.M.	World's Best Rock Artist	Nominated

== Žebřík Music Awards ==
Year	Nominee / work	Award	Result	Ref.
1995	R.E.M.	Best International Enjoyment	Nominated	
1996	New Adventures in Hi-Fi	Best International Album	Nominated	
1998	Themselves	Best International Group	Nominated	
1998	Themselves	Best International Surprise	Nominated	
1998	Michael Stipe	Best International Male	Nominated	
1998	Michael Stipe	Best International Personality	Nominated	
1998	"Daysleeper"	Best International Song	Nominated	
1999	Michael Stipe	Best International Personality	Nominated	
1999	Themselves	Best International Group	Nominated	
2001	Themselves	Best International Group	Nominated	
2001	Reveal	Best International Album	Nominated	
2003	"Bad Day"	Best International Song	Nominated	
2003	"Bad Day"	Best International Video	Nominated	
2003	Themselves	Best International Group	Nominated	
2004	Themselves	Best International Group	Nominated	
2004	Michael Stipe	Best International Personality	Nominated	
2004	Around the Sun	Best International Album	Nominated	
2008	Accelerate	Best International Album	Nominated	
2011	Disintegration of REM	Best International Průser	Nominated	
