= Texarkana (disambiguation) =

Texarkana may refer to:

- Texarkana metropolitan area, a two-county region in Texas and Arkansas, United States, anchored by the following two cities:
  - Texarkana, Texas
  - Texarkana, Arkansas
- Texarkana College, Texarkana, Texas, a community college
- "Texarkana" (song), by R.E.M., featuring Mike Mills on lead vocals
- Texarkana, a fictional city in A Canticle for Leibowitz, Walter Miller's post-apocalyptic novel
