= The Power and the Glory (disambiguation) =

The Power and the Glory is a 1940 novel by Graham Greene.

The Power and the Glory may also refer to:

- "The power and the glory", a phrase from the doxology at the end of the Lord's Prayer

== Literature ==
- The Power and the Glory (1910), a novel by Grace MacGowan Cooke
- The Power and the Glory (1925), a novel by Gilbert Parker
- "The Power and the Glory" (1930), a short story by Charles Willard Diffin
- The Power and the Glory (1947), a novella by Henry Kuttner
- The Power and the Glory (1984), a non-fiction book by David Yallop
- Goddess Durga: The Power and the Glory (2009), a non-fiction book by Pratapaditya Pal
- The Power and the Glory (2009), a novella by Robert E. Vardeman
- The Power and the Glory (2011), a novel by William C. Hammond
- Ian Botham: The Power and the Glory (2011), a non-fiction book by Simon Wilde
- The Power and the Glory (2024), a non-fiction book by Adrian Tinniswood
- The Power and the Glory (2025), a non-fiction book by Jonathan Wilson

== Film and television ==
- The Power and the Glory (1918 film), a film by Lawrence C. Windom
- The Power and the Glory (1933 film), a film starring Spencer Tracy
- The Power and the Glory (1941 film), an Australian film
- The Power and the Glory, a 1961 American TV film
- The Power and the Glory (TV series), a 1992 BBC documentary series
- "The Power and the Glory" (Lucky Feller), a 1976 television episode

== Music ==
=== Albums ===
- The Power and the Glory (Bad Ends album) (2023)
- The Power and the Glory (Cockney Rejects album) (1981)
- The Power and the Glory (Gentle Giant album) (1974)
- The Power and the Glory (Jimmy Cliff album) (1983)
- Power & the Glory, a 1983 album by Saxon

=== Songs ===
- "Power and the Glory", a 1964 song by Phil Ochs
- "The Power and the Glory", a song by Horslips from The Book of Invasions
- "The Power and the Glory", a 1983 song by Twisted Sister from You Can't Stop Rock 'n' Roll
- "The Power and the Glory", a 2003 song by Spiritualized from Amazing Grace
- "The Power & the Glory", a 2011 song by White Lies from Ritual

== Other uses ==
- Power and Glory, a professional wrestling tag team
- The Power and the Glory, a 1956 play by Denis Cannan
- Power and Glory, a 1994 comic book miniseries by Howard Chaykin
- Power and Glory, a 1994 children's book by Emily Rodda
