= Near Wild Heaven =

1991 single by R.E.M.

Single by R.E.M.

from the album Out of Time
- B-side: "Pop Song '89" (live acoustic)
- Released: August 5, 1991
- Studio: Bearsville (Woodstock, New York); John Keane (Athens, Georgia); Soundscape (Atlanta, Georgia)
- Genre: Alternative rock; jangle pop; sunshine pop
- Length: 3:18
- Label: Warner Bros.
- Songwriters: Bill Berry; Peter Buck; Mike Mills; Michael Stipe
- Producers: Scott Litt; R.E.M.

R.E.M. singles chronology
"Shiny Happy People" (1991)	"Near Wild Heaven" (1991)	"Radio Song" (1991)

"Near Wild Heaven" is a song by American rock band R.E.M., released in August 1991 by Warner Bros. as the third single from their seventh studio album, Out of Time (1991). The song was also the first single released by the band to have had its lyrics both co-written and sung by bassist Mike Mills. According to a quote from Peter Buck in R.E.M. Inside Out: The Stories Behind Every Song by Craig Rosen, the lyrics are a collaboration between Mills and lead singer Michael Stipe. It peaked at No. 27 on the UK Singles Chart but the single was not released in the United States. Mike Mills had written the lyrics to the single "(Don't Go Back To) Rockville", and he had sung the cover song "Superman", but he had not sung his own work on a single release

== Critical reception ==
Barbara Ellen from NME wrote, "This whilst still gorgeous does not match 'Losing My Religion's maverick vision, or the ecstatic giggle of 'Shiny Happy People'." Parry Gettelman from Orlando Sentinel felt that "Near Wild Heaven" "already overdoes the contrast between dark-edged lyrics and a light-hearted melody by folding Mike Mills' lead vocal into a sugary arrangement. Adding strings to the recipe is like putting frosting on cherry pie."

== Track listing ==
All songs were written by Bill Berry, Peter Buck, Mike Mills, and Michael Stipe except "Tom's Diner", written by Suzanne Vega. All live tracks were recorded at The Borderline Club in London, England, on March 15, 1991, except "Half a World Away", which was recorded on Rockline in Los Angeles on April 1, 1991.

- 7-inch and cassette
1. "Near Wild Heaven"
2. "Pop Song '89" (live)
- 12-inch
1. "Near Wild Heaven"
2. "Pop Song '89" (live)
3. "Half a World Away" (live)
- CD
1. "Near Wild Heaven" – 3:18
2. "Tom's Diner" (live) – 2:04
3. "Low" (live) – 4:59
4. "Endgame" (live) – 3:28

== Personnel ==
Personnel are taken from Out of Time liner notes.

R.E.M.

- Bill Berry – drums, percussion, piano, vocals
- Peter Buck – guitar
- Mike Mills – vocals, bass guitar
- Michael Stipe – vocals

Additional musicians

- Kidd Jordan – baritone saxophone
- Kate Pierson – backing vocals

Strings

- David Arenz – violin
- Ellie Arenz – violin
- Mark Bingham – string arrangements
- David Braitberg – violin
- Andrew Cox – cello
- Reid Harris – viola
- Ralph Jones – double bass
- Dave Kempers – violin
- Elizabeth Murphy – cello
- Paul Murphy – viola

== Charts ==
Weekly chart performance for "Near Wild Heaven"
Chart (1991)	Peak position
Australia (ARIA)	65
Europe (European Hit Radio)	28
Germany (GfK)	46
Ireland (IRMA)	3
Netherlands (Dutch Top 40 Tipparade)	11
Netherlands (Single Top 100)	51
UK Singles (OCC)	27
UK Airplay (Music Week)	8

== Release history ==
Release dates and formats for "Near Wild Heaven"
Region	Date	Format(s)	Label(s)	Ref.
United Kingdom	August 5, 1991	7-inch vinyl; 12-inch vinyl; CD	Warner Bros.	
Australia	September 9, 1991	12-inch vinyl; CD; cassette	Warner Bros.	
