= Out of Time (album) =

R.E.M. album from 1991

- Cover to the standard release of Out of Time

Studio album by R.E.M.
- Released: March 12, 1991
- Recorded: Mid-1990
- Studios: Bearsville (Woodstock); John Keane (Athens, Georgia); Soundscape (Atlanta)
- Genres: Alternative rock; folk rock; chamber pop
- Length: 44:08
- Label: Warner Bros.
- Producers: Scott Litt; R.E.M.

R.E.M. chronology
| Green (1988) | Out of Time (1991) | This Film Is On (1991) |

Alternate cover
- Spanish limited edition LP cover by Spanish artist Isabel Rivera Galicia

Singles from Out of Time
- 1. "Losing My Religion" Released: February 19, 1991; 2. "Shiny Happy People" Released: May 7, 1991; 3. "Near Wild Heaven" Released: August 5, 1991; 4. "Radio Song" Released: November 4, 1991

Out of Time is the seventh studio album by American alternative rock band R.E.M., released on March 12, 1991, by Warner Bros. Records. The record topped the album sales charts in both the United States and the United Kingdom, spending 109 weeks on U.S. album charts, with two separate spells at the top, and spending 183 weeks on the British charts, including one week at the top. The album has sold more than four and a half million copies in the United States and more than 18 million copies worldwide and was certified 4× Platinum by the RIAA. Out of Time won three Grammy Awards in 1992: one as Best Alternative Music Album, and two for its first single, "Losing My Religion".

== Details ==
Out of Time combines elements of pop, folk and classical music heard on the band's previous album, Green, with a new concentration on country elements that would continue on 1992's Automatic for the People. It features guest appearances by KRS-One and Kate Pierson from The B-52's.

Preceded by the release of "Losing My Religion", which became R.E.M.'s biggest U.S. hit, Out of Time gave them their first U.S. and UK No. 1 album. The band did not tour to support the release, although they did make occasional appearances on television or at festivals. In Germany, it is the band's best-selling album, selling more than 1,250,000 copies, reaching 5× gold. Out of Time was the first R.E.M. album to have an alternative expanded release on CD, including expanded liner notes and postcards. In Spain, a contest was held to have a limited-edition cover, with the winner being an abstract oil painting.

For the 25th anniversary the album was remastered. The standard version of the reissue comes with a second disc of demos, the deluxe version adds a third disc featuring live acoustic tracks. It was released through Concord Records on November 18, 2016.

== Songs ==
=== Time Side ===
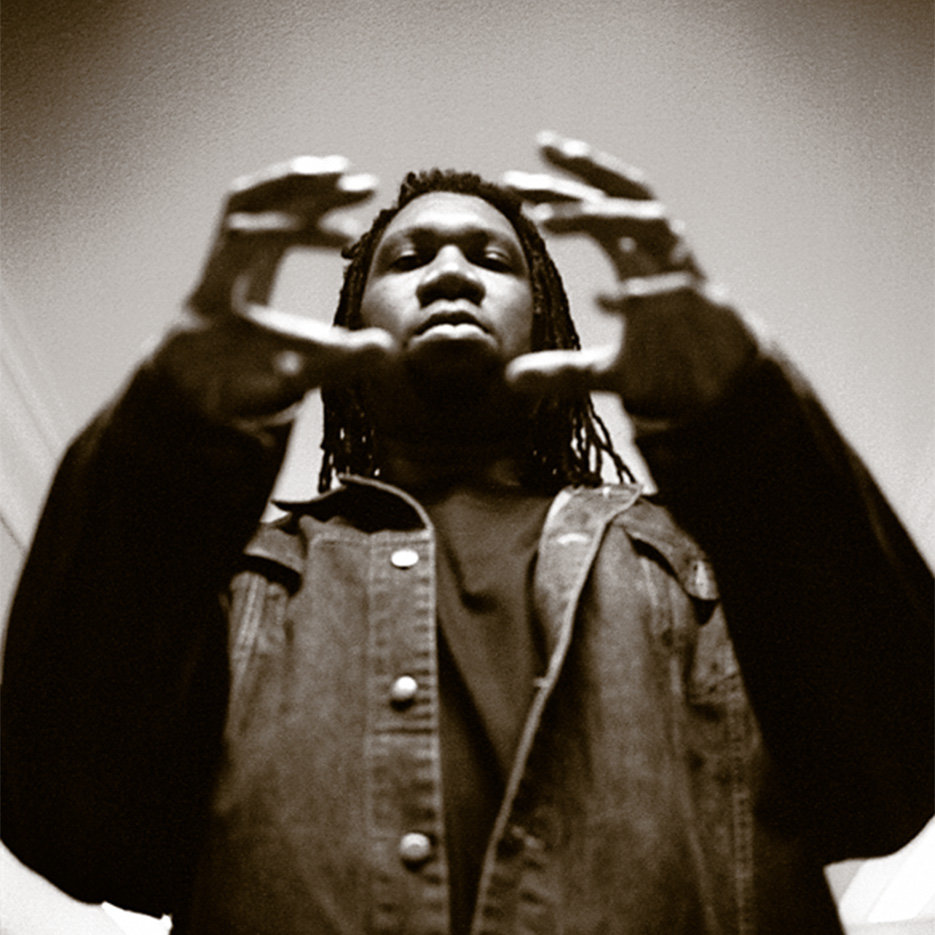
KRS-One (pictured in 2002) contributed guest vocals to "Radio Song", including a spoken-word intro that was unprecedented for R.E.M. at the time.

"Radio Song" begins with a spoken-word introduction by KRS-One of Boogie Down Productions, rather than with instrumentation or vocals from the band. This marks a departure from the group's typical introductions, which often feature Bill Berry's drumming, Peter Buck's guitar, Mike Mills's bass, or Michael Stipe's vocals. Following KRS-One's initial lines, the arrangement transitions into more familiar territory, with Buck's guitar, Mills's bass, and Stipe's vocals entering the mix. The track incorporates elements of funk, a style R.E.M. had previously explored on "Can't Get There from Here" from Fables of the Reconstruction. In this instance, the funk elements are described by participants in the recording process as more naturalistic. The inclusion of KRS-One, who expanded his contribution beyond what was originally requested, is cited by members of the band as a significant factor in the track's development. Berry noted that the song, while built on a strong groove, lacked impact prior to the addition of KRS-One's performance.

Additional musicians contributed to the track. While Mills divided his performance between bass and Hammond organ, Peter Holsapple provided supplementary bass lines. Kidd Jordan performed on tenor, alto, and baritone saxophone, and producer Scott Litt added echo and tape loop effects. The track also marks the first appearance of strings on the album, arranged and conducted by Mark Bingham. Instrumentally, the track features funk-influenced guitar from Buck, syncopated drumming from Berry, and organ playing from Mills that has been likened to the style of recordings released on the Stax label. Stipe's vocal delivery incorporates both directness and irony. The song's lyrics address radio programming practices, specifically the repetition of formulaic content. Although the tone of the lyrics includes critique, Stipe later stated that the intent was partly humorous and self-referential.

"Losing My Religion" emerged from an initial idea by Buck. He experimented with a mandolin while drinking beer and watching a baseball game, recording the result on a boom box. During rehearsals, the band worked on this initial idea, with Berry initially playing bass before switching to drums. The song developed into a full band arrangement, with Buck on mandolin and electric octave guitar, Mills on bass and keyboard strings, Berry on drums and percussion, and Holsapple on acoustic guitar. The strings, arranged by Bingham and Mills, were performed by members of the Atlanta Symphony Orchestra at Soundscape Studios in Atlanta, Georgia, in October 1990.

Despite its title, the song does not reference religion in a literal sense. According to Stipe, the phrase "losing my religion" is a Southern expression meaning to be at the end of one's patience or composure. Stipe described the song as secular and categorized it as an "obsession song". The origins of the phrase were initially met with skepticism by Buck, who considered it potentially a fabrication. However, a subsequent encounter in New Orleans with an elderly woman who recognized the expression from her youth confirmed the term's authenticity. The song has also been misinterpreted as autobiographical, particularly due to the lyric "that's me in the spotlight". Stipe denied this interpretation, indicating that the line was not intended to reflect personal experience. He later suggested that the song could be read as a commentary on broader social conditions, identifying it as an extension of the themes explored in the earlier R.E.M. track "World Leader Pretend". Stipe stated that his intent in writing "Losing My Religion" was to emulate the emotional tone and structure of the Police's "Every Breath You Take". The result, according to Stipe, achieved that goal to a satisfactory degree.

"Low" is characterized by a subdued and somber tone. The composition centers on Mills's organ part, described as reminiscent of a funeral parlor, which serves as the song's primary melodic and atmospheric foundation. The recording features contributions from all members of the band: Berry plays congas, Buck handles guitar, and Holsapple provides the bass part. The arrangement is augmented by a bass clarinet performance from Jordan and another string arrangement conducted by Bingham.

Lyrically, "Low" includes a critique of conventional love songs. Stipe expressed a longstanding aversion to love songs, describing them as "horrible and manipulative". Nevertheless, this track marked one of the few instances since "The One I Love" in which he included the word "love" in his lyrics. Buck associated the track's atmosphere with a specific visual impression, stating that it evoked an image of prehistoric people gathered around a campfire, shrouded in fog. Stipe, meanwhile, emphasized the song's use of dramatic effect, noting that the word "time" functions as a pivotal element in the final verse: "You and me, we know about time." Despite the track's melancholic tone, Stipe later downplayed its seriousness. He explained that the lyrics were assembled quickly while on tour, describing the process as spontaneous and the result as humorous rather than deeply reflective.

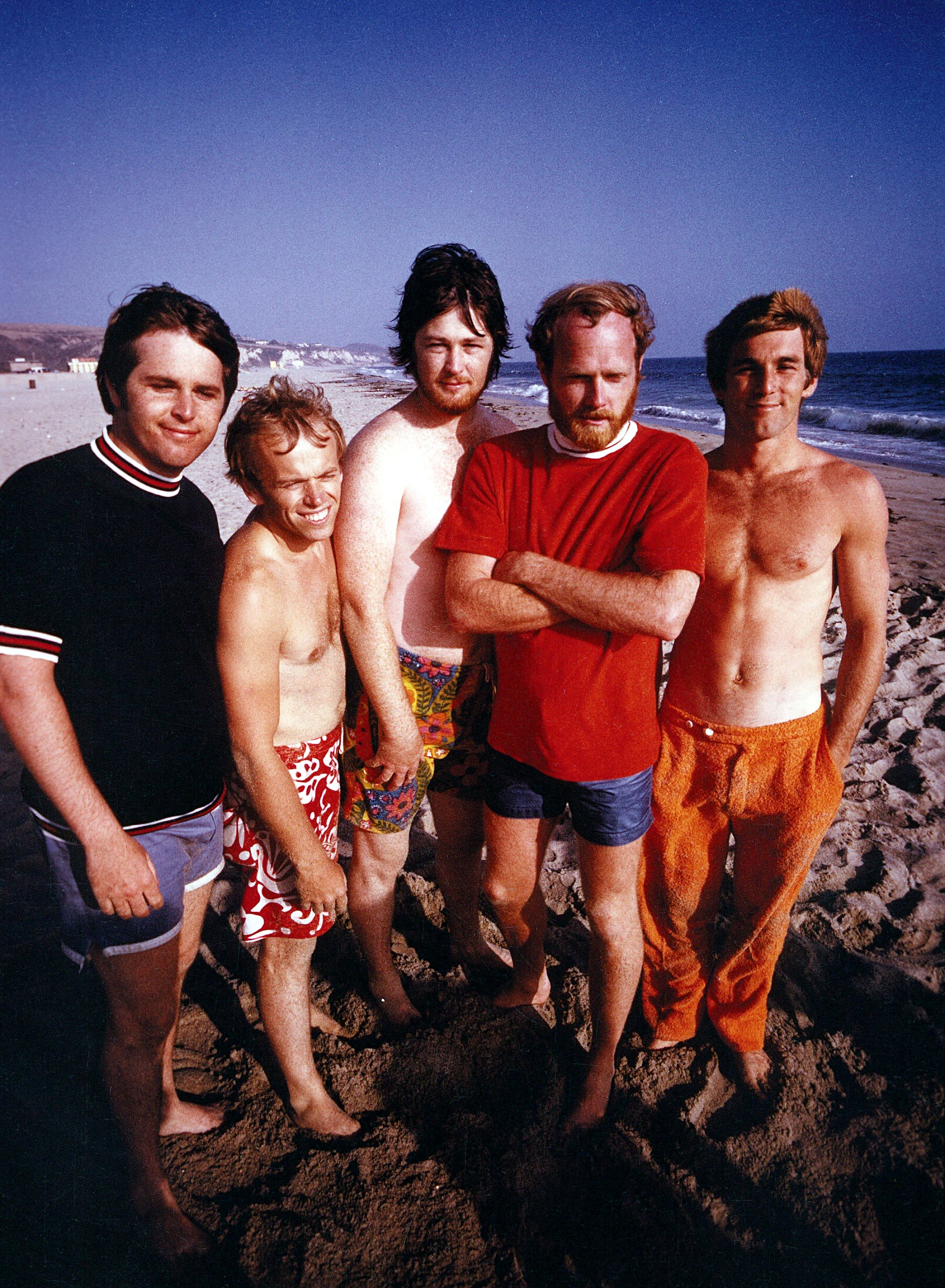
"Near Wild Heaven" was strongly influenced by the Beach Boys (pictured in 1967), particularly their albums Smiley Smile and Wild Honey.

"Near Wild Heaven" according to the author Craig Rosen in R.E.M. Inside Out: the Stories Behind Every Song "brings Out Of Time up with its optimism". The song features Mills as the primary vocalist, one of only two such instances on the album. According to Buck, the track functions as a duet between Mills and Stipe, with both contributing to the lyrics. The song exhibits a strong influence from the Beach Boys. Buck cited the release of Capitol Records' Beach Boys reissues during the Out of Time recording sessions, specifically the Smiley Smile and Wild Honey editions, as a factor in shaping the track's direction. Buck, who has listed Pet Sounds among his favorite albums, acknowledged the band's intent to echo the Beach Boys' vocal harmonies. He recalled that Mills and Berry had previously sung along to Beach Boys songs while driving together, and he noted that he may have suggested a high harmony part to reinforce the stylistic reference. Stipe, by contrast, expressed ambivalence toward the Beach Boys. He stated that he had limited exposure to Pet Sounds and had listened to the album under pressure from Buck and Mills. Although he acknowledged the Beach Boys' Brian Wilson's talent, he indicated a lack of personal connection to the band's music.

"Endgame" is an instrumental composition characterized by orchestral textures and minimal vocal elements. Although the piece includes "la la la" vocalizations by Stipe, it does not contain lyrics. According to Buck, the track was originally conceived as "End Title Sequence," intended to evoke the feeling of a film's closing credits. Stipe described the mental imagery associated with the piece as that of Buck seated on a large stage, surrounded by classically trained musicians, with his guitar playing integrated into a broader orchestral context. Stipe considered "Endgame" his first significant attempt at composing for live musicians. Rather than writing lyrics, he chose to substitute his vocal lines with instrumental parts that he felt resembled his voice, with the exception of the opening verse. Stipe explained his reluctance to add lyrics by emphasizing the abstract potential of instrumental music. In his view, the inclusion of words can limit interpretation and impose a fixed narrative, thereby reducing the open-ended emotional resonance of the music.

One notable contribution to "Endgame" came from flugelhorn player Cecil Welch, who had previously worked with composer Henry Mancini. Stipe, who stated that he had grown up listening to Mancini's music, expressed appreciation for Welch's involvement, noting that the part he composed for Welch bore a strong resemblance to Mancini's style. Buck addressed the broader context of rock musicians incorporating orchestral elements, citing George Melly's critique of superficial uses of classical motifs in rock. Buck differentiated "Endgame" from these approaches by aligning it with more modest string quartet arrangements, stating that the piece lacked the bombast often associated with classical-inspired rock compositions. The track features contributions from all four members of R.E.M. Berry played percussion, Buck contributed acoustic and electric guitars, Mills played bass and sang backing vocals, and Stipe performed on bass melodica in addition to handling vocal, horn, and string arrangement duties. Holsapple assisted with string arrangement alongside Stipe and Bingham. Jordan played both bass clarinet and tenor saxophone on the track.

=== Memory Side ===
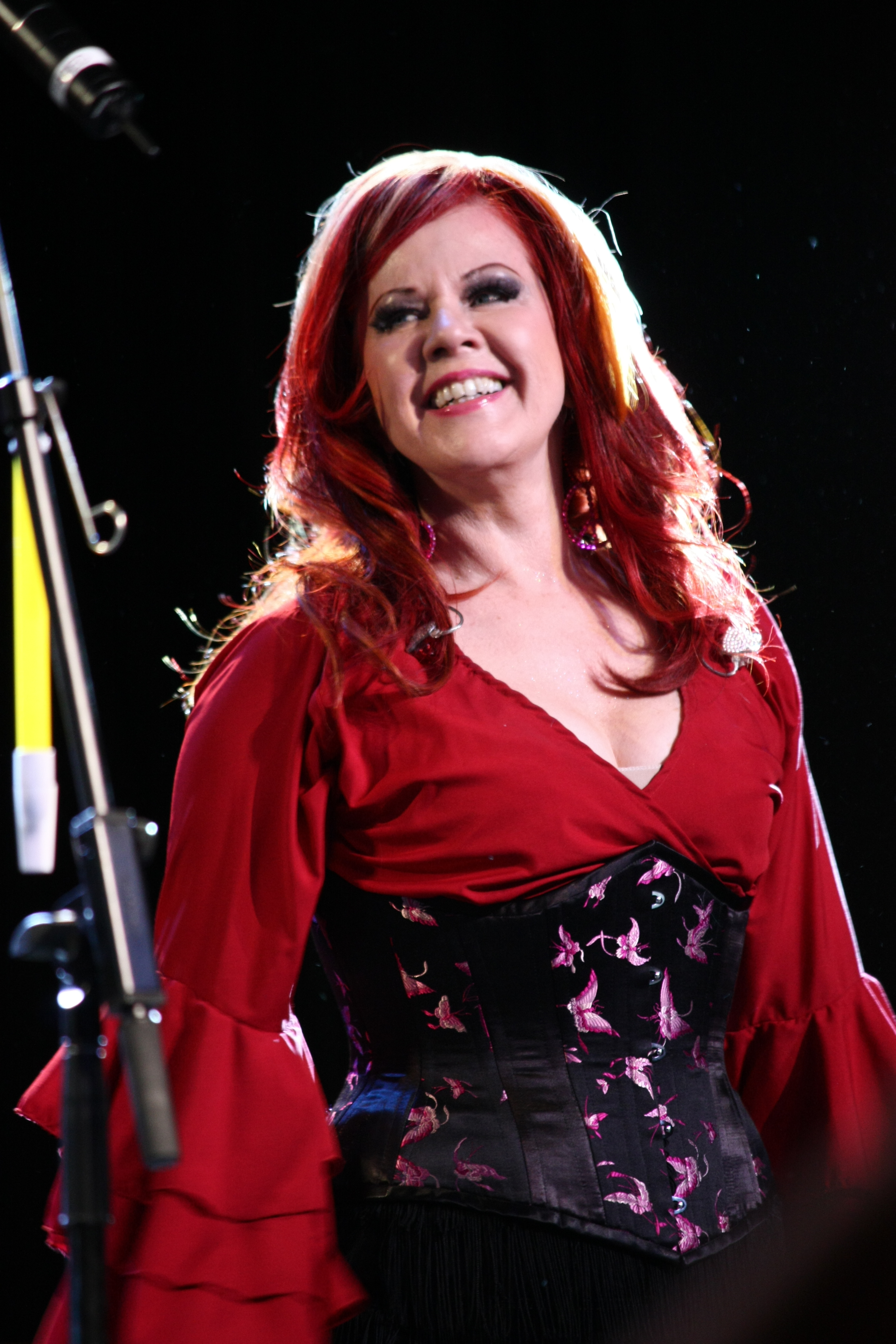
"Shiny Happy People" was R.E.M.'s first collaboration with Kate Pierson (pictured in 2009), who contributed backing vocals on it and three other songs on Out of Time.

"Shiny Happy People" marked R.E.M.'s first collaboration with Kate Pierson of the B-52s. The song, which features Pierson on guest vocals, was described by Stipe as an "abortion", while Mills characterized working with Pierson as a highlight. According to Mills, although the band was familiar with Pierson and her work, they had not collaborated with her prior to this recording. Stipe also expressed admiration for her, referring to her as "probably my favorite female singer". Buck noted that while the track included what he called a "silly lyric", it was not the result of extended labor. Buck added that he had no desire to perform the song live but still expressed a degree of fondness for its spontaneous nature, stating, "It is what it is." He also referred to the song as "tongue-in-cheek". Stipe, however, offered a contrasting interpretation, at one point describing "Shiny Happy People" as a sincere composition and "the happiest song" he had written. He cited its lyrical sounds, particularly the abundance of "E" vowels, as contributing to its upbeat tone, claiming, "You can't sing the words without smiling." He also identified himself as "an extraordinarily happy person".

The song's musical construction includes an unexpected change in time signature, most notably a 3/4 waltz-time signature section in the introduction and the middle of the track. Mills expressed ambivalence about this structural choice, remarking that "Psychotic Reaction" was, in his view, the only song to successfully change time signatures mid-song. Nevertheless, he acknowledged that experimentation was a core aspect of the band's creative process. Berry also supported the inclusion of such elements, stating that introducing "wacky new ideas" helped keep the band's recordings engaging and unconventional. He specifically pointed to the time signature shift in "Shiny Happy People" as an example of such experimentation.

"Belong" draws structural and stylistic influence from the earlier R.E.M. recording "Voice of Harold", a reinterpretation of "7 Chinese Bros" featuring Stipe reading gospel liner notes in place of the original lyrics. While "Voice of Harold" was conceived as a humorous outtake, "Belong" employs a similar spoken-word vocal approach in a more serious context. Stipe's vocals in the song were not recorded in a professional studio but rather on a Walkman in a garage. Unsatisfied with the clarity of the initial studio recordings, he opted for a more ambient approach. "It was too clear, it was too studio", he said during a Rockline interview. Borrowing producer Litt's Walkman, Stipe recorded his vocal part in the garage of a rental home. He described the acoustics of the three-car garage, where he noted the presence of a large tank of unidentified gas, as providing the ideal reverberation for the track. The song's arrangement prominently features background vocals by Mills and Berry.

Lyrically, the song centers on a woman and her child. In one line, she opens a window, prompting interpretations that led Stipe to clarify its meaning. "I think it's significant to state that it's not a song about defenestration," he told Harold DeMuir in Pulse!. He explained that the woman experiences a moment of realization triggered by a distant event, leading her to open the window for air. He acknowledged that the original draft may have implied a more violent act but stated that he revised certain lines to eliminate that reading. The lyrics refer to "creatures" that have "jumped the barricades and have headed for the sea", a phrase that Stipe linked to broader, though undefined, external threats. He once referred to the song as "probably the most political song on the record", although he did not elaborate further. Prior to performing the song live, Stipe described it as "another song about war, but another type of war. A more intimate type." While the meaning of "Belong" remains open to interpretation, Stipe has referred to the song as "very uplifting". Nonetheless, he has not publicly explained what specifically leads him to that conclusion.

"Half a World Away" continues the album's "bittersweet tone". The composition features a blend of organ, acoustic guitar, and mandolin, with Stipe beginning the song with the line, "This could be the saddest dusk I've ever seen." In live performances, Stipe has introduced the song by stating, "This may well be the saddest song ever written." The musical arrangement reflects influences drawn from Buck's experiences outside of R.E.M. at the time. Buck described participating in informal jam sessions with folk musicians, often playing on front porches. "I would play these traditional songs with these guys and I was the only guy who didn't know these songs or had never played them," he explained. While noting that these sessions were different from his background in rock music, Buck suggested that elements of this folk-oriented environment may have influenced the song's development. Despite these influences, Buck distinguished R.E.M.'s music from traditional folk. "We're not folk musicians, so we would always screw it up somehow," he said, noting that the band's songs typically feature more complex chord structures and time signatures than those found in folk traditions.

The instrumentation on "Half a World Away" includes contributions beyond the band's standard setup. In addition to the mandolin and organ, Mills plays harpsichord, adding a baroque texture to the track. A string arrangement by Bingham is also featured. Although the lyrics appear to express longing, Stipe has stated that the narrative of the song is entirely fictional. He told the music journalist David Fricke in Melody Maker, "It doesn't make sense to anybody but me. And even to me, it's a totally fabricated experience. It's drawn from things that I know or saw on TV or that people I know told me. It's a complete fabrication. But there's something there."

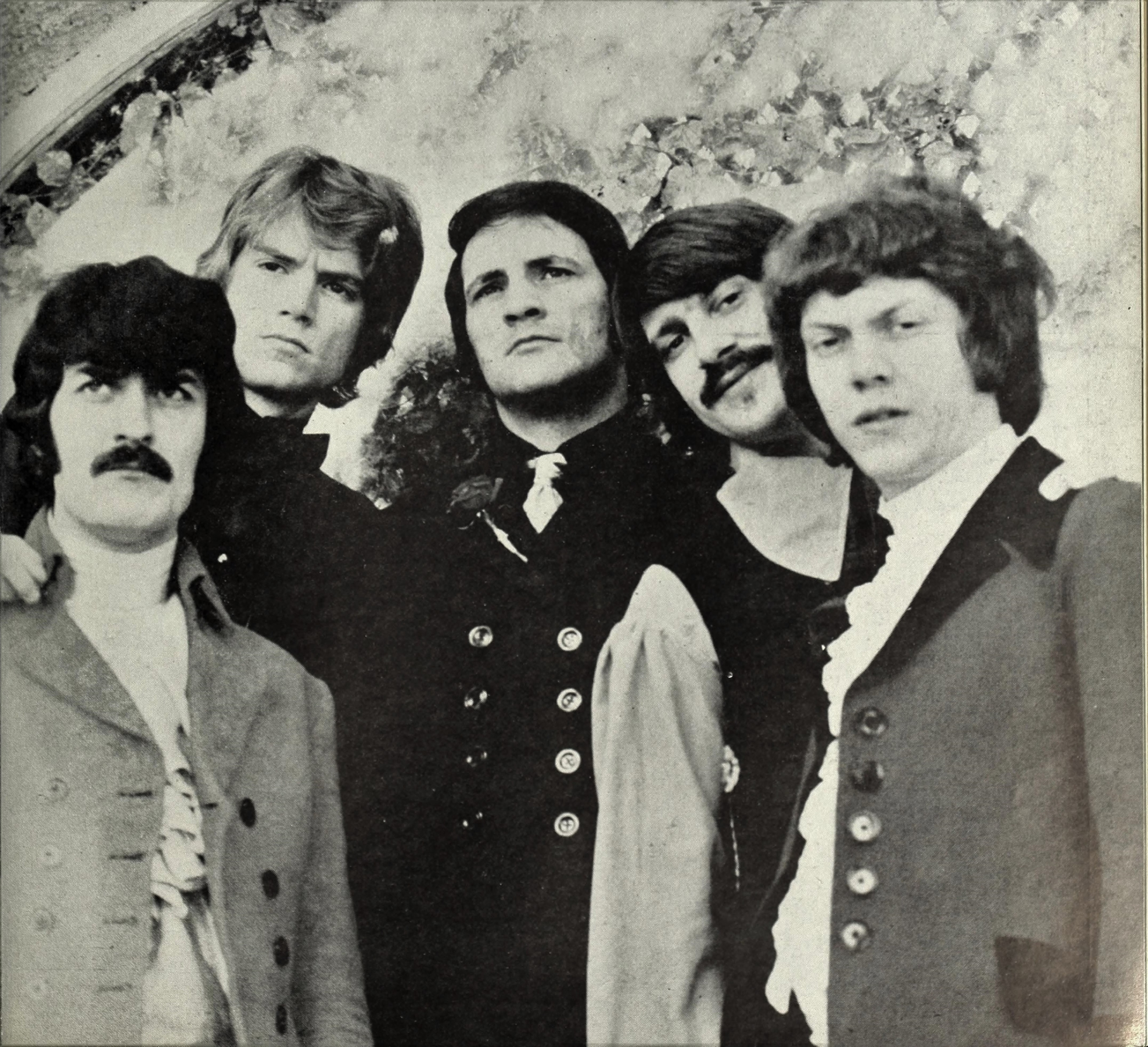
Reviewers drew comparisons between "Texarkana" and the music of the Moody Blues (pictured in 1968).

"Texarkana" features a notable shift in vocal duties within R.E.M., with Mills performing lead vocals while Stipe provides background vocals. Mills described the experience of singing lead as enjoyable, though not something he would prefer to do regularly. He noted the advantage of the band having three distinct vocalists, stating that this contributes to greater texture and depth in their sound. Musically, the song is characterized by a galloping bass line, a blend of real and synthesized string elements, and a melodic style that has drawn comparisons to the Moody Blues. Additional contributions to the arrangement include pedal steel guitar performed by John Keane and work by Holsapple.

The title of the song references Texarkana, a city straddling the border between Texas and Arkansas with separate municipal governments in each state. However, the lyrics of the song make no reference to the city, and the content is unrelated to its name. According to Buck, Stipe initially began writing a song that included the name Texarkana in its working title but was unable to complete it. Mills subsequently finished the lyrics and recorded the lead vocal part within approximately thirty minutes. Despite the change in lyrical content, the band chose to retain the original title. Buck expressed a personal liking for the name, while both Stipe and Berry also shared a fondness for the city. Stipe commented on the appeal of a city named after three states, while Berry described Texarkana as a beautiful place, though not necessarily one associated with enlightenment.

"Country Feedback" was developed in a spontaneous and informal manner during early recording sessions. According to Buck, the song originated without a predetermined structure. Buck entered the studio with a four-chord progression, which he recorded while Berry played bass. Buck then added feedback guitar. Stipe contributed lyrics shortly thereafter, initially indicating he had words prepared for the track. Buck has stated that the total recording time, excluding mixing, was approximately 35 minutes. However, he later clarified that there was a one-day interval between the instrumental recording and Stipe's vocal session. In the completed track, Buck plays both acoustic and feedback-heavy electric guitar (credited as "loud guitar"), Berry performs bass and percussion, Mills plays organ, Keane contributes pedal steel guitar, and Pierson provides backing vocals that are largely inaudible in the final mix.

Stipe's lyrical approach to "Country Feedback" involved a stream-of-consciousness technique that he described as "projectile vomiting". Buck recalled that Stipe arrived the following day and delivered the vocal part without written lyrics, using only two small drawings as reference—an Indian head and an arrow. The vocal delivery was largely improvised, and the band offered limited input or revision. The lyrics convey a sense of emotional turmoil, and Stipe characterized the song as a desperate expression focused on the end of a relationship. He referred to it as a love song told from what he described as the "uglier side." Buck, reflecting on Stipe's performance, considered the lyrics to be authentic to Stipe's mindset at the time of recording.

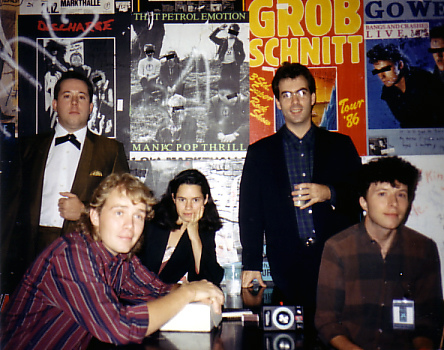
"Me in Honey" was written as a gender-flipped response to "Eat for Two" by 10,000 Maniacs (pictured in 1987).

"Me in Honey" originated from a minimal musical idea built around a single chord. According to Buck, the foundation of the song was a one-chord riff that Mills played once. Buck added a guitar line over it, and Berry contributed a drum pattern. The initial idea, which was approximately 30 seconds long, was placed at the end of a cassette containing five other tracks. Stipe focused on this brief segment, responding to its beat and key, D flat, with immediate lyrical inspiration. When Buck suggested adding a second chord for the chorus, Stipe reportedly agreed. The band structured the song by segmenting the riff so that each verse varied in length. Stipe then developed the lyrics by writing and revising lines on paper. Buck expressed surprise at the lyrical depth Stipe derived from a single-chord idea. Thematically, Stipe has described "Me in Honey" as a response to 10,000 Maniacs' "Eat For Two", written by his friend Natalie Merchant. He characterized the song as presenting a male perspective on pregnancy, involving conflicting emotions. According to Stipe, the narrator simultaneously expresses detachment and emotional involvement. Musically, the track features R.E.M.'s standard instrumentation, with the addition of guest vocals by Pierson.

== Packaging ==
Warner Bros. Records executive Jeff Gold, alongside Rock the Vote campaign co-founder and Virgin Records executive Jeff Ayeroff, approached R.E.M. in regards to printing a petition on the back of Out of Time's CD longbox packaging in the United States, where buyers were encouraged to sign their name in support for Rock the Vote, who were in support of the Motor Voter Act to ease voter registration, and would allow voters "to register through their local DMV". Gold reasoned, considering many of the album's buyers would be young, that this could "vote out" the controversial Parents Music Resource Center music censorship bill, who "put pressure on the creators and distributors of 'objectionable' music", as well as make good use of the popular longbox packaging format of the day, which many artists and customers considered unnecessary and wasteful. Michael Stipe also appeared in a public service announcement for the campaign.

In July 2014, radio show 99% Invisible said that because of this packaging, Out of Time is "the most politically significant album in the history of the United States". They said that three weeks after the album's release, "they had received 10,000 petitions, 100 per senator, and they just kept coming in droves", and a month following its release, the campaign's political director and members of KMD "wheeled a shopping cart full of the first 10,000 petitions into a senate hearing". The bill was eventually passed in 1993 by Bill Clinton and was in effect January 1, 1995; one commentary later said this happened "in no small part because of R.E.M.'s lobbying".

== Critical reception ==
Contemporary professional reviews
Review scores
| Source | Rating |
|---|---|
| Chicago Tribune | 3.5/4 stars |
| Entertainment Weekly | B− |
| Los Angeles Times | 3/5 stars |
| NME | 10/10 |
| Q | 4/5 stars |
| Rolling Stone | 4/5 stars |
| Select | 5/5 |

Out of Time received mostly positive reviews on release. Critics offered varied perspectives on the album, highlighting its experimentation and emotional depth. Greg Kot of the Chicago Tribune called the album "R.E.M.'s most consistent effort since Reckoning" and appreciated its use of strings, horns, and guest musicians, which "accent the band's melodic strengths". He described the album as "a song cycle of love songs that sound intimate even in the wide open spaces of the arrangements". Writing for Entertainment Weekly, David Browne felt the album fell short of the band's previous standards, stating that while "strings, organs, and collaborations with rappers and the B-52's" gave the album a different texture, it "never matches the vibrancy of the band's earlier work." In the Los Angeles Times, Richard Cromelin observed that the album diverged from the sound of Green, noting that it "draws a line between the bright polish of its radio-ready pop songs and the impressionistic allure of its more shadowy tracks." He acknowledged the string arrangements and moments where R.E.M. aimed to "recapture the aura of their early mystique." Mark Cooper of Q agreed, highlighting Stipe's vocals and the harmony singing while describing the album as a "brooding departure [that] offers them at their most reflective, challenging and intriguing".

Terry Staunton of NME highlighted the album's eclecticism, noting it "veers from the playful exuberance of 'Shiny Happy People' to the desolate beauty of 'Country Feedback'". He concluded, "This is a band growing older with dignity, without losing their sense of adventure." Parke Puterbaugh of Rolling Stone praised the record for achieving a balance between new mainstream appeal and the band's original identity, writing, "R.E.M. have managed to simultaneously branch out and consolidate their strengths." David Cavanagh of Select labeled Out of Time the band's "finest album to date". He noted a shift from political themes toward introspection, remarking, "This is an album of sweet melodies and tender words", with Mike Mills taking a larger role, as exemplified by his lead vocals on "Near Wild Heaven".

Out of Time was one of R.E.M.'s more successful albums in terms of awards and nominations. It was their only album to win a Grammy Award, for Best Alternative Music Album. It also won the Q Award for Best Album of 1991.

The band did not tour to promote the album, although they did make sporadic appearances at music festivals and on TV. On April 13, 1991, R.E.M. was the musical guest on Saturday Night Live and performed "Shiny Happy People" (with Kate Pierson) and "Losing My Religion".

== Legacy ==
Retrospective professional reviews
Aggregate scores
| Source | Rating |
|---|---|
| Metacritic | 80/100 |
Review scores
| Source | Rating |
| AllMusic | 2.5/5 stars |
| American Songwriter | 4/5 |
| Christgau's Consumer Guide | A |
| Classic Rock | 3.5/5 stars |
| Drowned in Sound | 9/10 |
| Pitchfork | 8.4/10 |
| Record Collector | 4/5 stars |
| Uncut | 4/5 stars |
| Under the Radar | 8/10 |

In 2000, Out of Time was voted number 49 in Colin Larkin's All Time Top 1000 Albums. It was featured in Time magazine's 2006 list of the "All-Time 100 Albums". According to the review aggregator Metacritic, the 25th anniversary re-release of Out of Time received "generally favorable reviews" based on a weighted average score of 80 out of 100 from nine critic reviews.

== Track listing ==
All tracks written by Bill Berry, Peter Buck, Mike Mills and Michael Stipe.

Time Side

1. "Radio Song" – 4:15
2. "Losing My Religion" – 4:28
3. "Low" – 4:55
4. "Near Wild Heaven" – 3:17
5. "Endgame" – 3:48

Memory Side

1. "Shiny Happy People" – 3:44
2. "Belong" – 4:03
3. "Half a World Away" – 3:26
4. "Texarkana" – 3:36
5. "Country Feedback" – 4:07
6. "Me in Honey" – 4:06

== Personnel ==
Personnel taken from Out of Time liner notes, except where indicated.

R.E.M.

- Bill Berry – drums ("Radio Song", "Losing My Religion", "Near Wild Heaven", "Shiny Happy People", "Belong", "Texarkana", "Me In Honey"), percussion (all tracks), congas ("Low"), bass guitar ("Half a World Away", "Country Feedback"), piano ("Near Wild Heaven"), vocals ("Near Wild Heaven", "Belong", "Country Feedback"); production
- Peter Buck – electric guitar (all except "Half a World Away"), acoustic guitar ("Endgame", "Half a World Away", "Country Feedback"), mandolin ("Losing My Religion", "Half a World Away"); production
- Mike Mills – bass guitar ("Radio Song", "Losing My Religion", "Near Wild Heaven", "Endgame", "Shiny Happy People", "Belong", "Texarkana", "Me In Honey"), vocals ("Losing My Religion", "Near Wild Heaven", "Endgame", "Shiny Happy People", "Belong", "Half a World Away", "Texarkana", "Me In Honey"), organ ("Radio Song", "Low", "Shiny Happy People", "Half a World Away", "Country Feedback"), piano ("Belong"), harpsichord and percussion ("Half a World Away"), keyboard strings and arrangement ("Losing My Religion", "Texarkana"); production
- Michael Stipe – vocals (all tracks), bass melodica and arrangements ("Endgame"); production, packaging, photography

Additional players

- Peter Holsapple – bass guitar ("Radio Song", "Low"), acoustic guitar ("Losing My Religion", "Shiny Happy People", "Texarkana"), electric guitar ("Belong")
- Kidd Jordan – baritone saxophone ("Radio Song", "Near Wild Heaven"), tenor saxophone ("Radio Song", "Endgame"), alto saxophone ("Radio Song"), bass clarinet ("Low", "Endgame")
- KRS-One – rapping ("Radio Song")
- John Keane – pedal steel guitar ("Texarkana", "Country Feedback")
- Kate Pierson – vocals ("Near Wild Heaven", "Shiny Happy People", "Country Feedback", "Me In Honey")
- Cecil Welch – flugelhorn ("Endgame")

Arrangements

- Mark Bingham – string arrangement ("Radio Song", "Losing My Religion", "Low", "Near Wild Heaven", "Endgame", "Shiny Happy People", "Half a World Away", "Texarkana"), horn arrangement

String section on "Radio Song", "Losing My Religion", "Low", "Near Wild Heaven", "Endgame", "Shiny Happy People", "Half a World Away", and "Texarkana"

- Dave Kempers – violin
- David Braitberg – violin
- David Arenz – violin
- Ellie Arenz – violin
- Reid Harris – viola
- Paul Murphy – viola, leader
- Andrew Cox – cello
- Elizabeth Murphy – cello
- Ralph Jones – double bass

Production

- Scott Litt – production, engineering, echo-loop feed ("Radio Song")
- Mike Reiter – assistant engineer (Bearsville)
- John Keane – engineering (John Keane)
- Ted Malia – assistant engineer (Soundscape)
- Dave Friedlander – assistant mix engineer
- Tom Garneau – assistant mix engineer
- Stephen Marcussen – mastering, at Precision Mastering, Los Angeles
- Tom Recchion – packaging
- Ben Katchor – picture No. 1: Marble Steps, picture No. 2: Passerby
- Frank Ockenfels – band photograph
- Ed Rogers – handlettering of song titles
- Karina Santos – animal photograph
- Doug and Mike Starn – photography: plant details, yellow seascape with film and woodblocks

== Charts ==
=== Weekly charts ===
Weekly chart performance for Out of Time
| Chart (1991–2020) | Peak position |
|---|---|
| Australian Albums (ARIA) | 4 |
| Austrian Albums (Ö3 Austria) | 1 |
| Belgian Albums (SABAM/IFPI) | 6 |
| Canada Top Albums/CDs (RPM) | 1 |
| Danish Albums (IFPI) | 8 |
| Dutch Albums (Album Top 100) | 1 |
| European Albums (Music & Media) | 1 |
| Finnish Albums (The Official Finnish Charts) | 5 |
| French Albums (SNEP) | 1 |
| German Albums (Offizielle Top 100) | 2 |
| Greek Albums (IFPI Greece) | 1 |
| Hungarian Albums (MAHASZ) | 13 |
| Irish Albums (IRMA) | 1 |
| Italian Albums (Musica e dischi) | 1 |
| New Zealand Albums (RMNZ) | 3 |
| Norwegian Albums (VG-lista) | 4 |
| Portuguese Albums (AFP) | 1 |
| Spanish Albums (AFYVE) | 3 |
| Swedish Albums (Sverigetopplistan) | 7 |
| Swiss Albums (Schweizer Hitparade) | 3 |
| UK Albums (Official Charts) | 1 |
| US Billboard 200 | 1 |

=== Year-end charts ===
1991 year-end chart performance for Out of Time
| Chart (1991) | Position |
|---|---|
| Australian Albums (ARIA) | 12 |
| Austrian Albums (Ö3 Austria) | 3 |
| Canada Top Albums/CDs (RPM) | 1 |
| Dutch Albums (Album Top 100) | 2 |
| European Albums (Music & Media) | 1 |
| French Albums (Europe 1) | 14 |
| Swiss Albums (Schweizer Hitparade) | 3 |
| UK Albums (OCC) | 6 |
| US Billboard 200 | 11 |

1992 year-end chart performance for Out of Time
| Chart (1992) | Position |
|---|---|
| UK Albums (OCC) | 47 |
| US Billboard 200 | 50 |

1993 year-end chart performance for Out of Time
| Chart (1993) | Position |
|---|---|
| UK Albums (OCC) | 73 |

== Certifications and sales ==
| Region | Certification | Certified units/sales |
|---|---|---|
| Argentina (CAPIF) | Gold | 30,000^{^} |
| Australia (ARIA) | 2× Platinum | 140,000^{^} |
| Austria (IFPI Austria) | Platinum | 50,000^{*} |
| Brazil (Pro-Música Brasil) | Gold | 100,000^{*} |
| Canada (Music Canada) | 7× Platinum | 700,000^{^} |
| Denmark (IFPI Danmark) | 3× Platinum | 60,000^{‡} |
| Finland (Musiikkituottajat) | Gold | 27,084 |
| France (SNEP) | 2× Platinum | 600,000^{*} |
| Germany (BVMI) | 5× Gold | 1,250,000^{^} |
| Italy sales up to 1999 | — | 500,000 |
| Italy (FIMI) sales since 2009 | Gold | 25,000^{‡} |
| Netherlands (NVPI) | 2× Platinum | 200,000^{^} |
| New Zealand (RMNZ) | Gold | 7,500^{^} |
| Norway | — | 60,000 |
| Spain (Promusicae) | 5× Platinum | 500,000^{^} |
| Sweden (GLF) | Gold | 50,000^{^} |
| Switzerland (IFPI Switzerland) | 2× Platinum | 100,000^{^} |
| United Kingdom (BPI) | 5× Platinum | 1,786,954 |
| United States (RIAA) | 4× Platinum | 4,000,000^{^} |
Summaries
| Worldwide | — | 18,000,000 |
^{*} Sales figures based on certification alone.^{^} Shipments figures based on certification alone.^{‡} Sales+streaming figures based on certification alone.

== Release history ==
In 2005, Warner Bros. Records issued an expanded two-disc edition of Out of Time which includes a CD, a DVD-Audio disc containing a 5.1-channel surround sound mix of the album done by Elliot Scheiner, lyrics, a photo album, and the original CD booklet with expanded liner notes. In 2011 Warner Bros. released a 96 kHz, 24-bit and 192 kHz, 24 bit stereo release (the same High-Resolution stereo mix as featured on the DVD-Audio and later, the Blu-Ray editions) of the album at HDtracks.

Out of Time

| Region | Date | Label | Format | Catalog |
|---|---|---|---|---|
| Germany | March 8, 1991 | Warner Bros. | Compact Disc | 7599-26496-2 |
| United Kingdom | March 11, 1991 | Warner Bros. | LP | 7599-26496-1 |
| United Kingdom | March 11, 1991 | Warner Bros. | Compact Disc | 7599-26496-2 |
| United States | March 12, 1991 | Warner Bros. | LP | 1-26496 |
| United States | March 12, 1991 | Warner Bros. | Compact Disc | 2-26527 |
| United States | March 12, 1991 | Warner Bros. | Cassette | 4-26496 |
| Canada | March 12, 1991 | Warner Bros. | Compact Disc | CD 26496 |
| France | March 1991 | Warner Bros. | Compact Disc | WE 833 |
| Germany | March 1991 | Warner Bros. | Digital Compact Cassette | 7599-26496-5 |
| Argentina | 1991 | Warner Bros. | Cassette | 4-26496 |
| Bolivia | 1991 | Warner Bros. | LP | WEA WL-1152 |
| Brazil | 1991 | Warner Bros. | LP | 6709323 |
| Germany | 1991 | Warner Bros. | LP | 7599-26496-1† |
| Israel | 1991 | Hed Arzi | Compact Disc | 9 26496-2 |
| Japan | 1991 | Warner Bros. | Compact Disc | WPCP 4195 |
| Mexico | 1991 | Warner Bros. | LP | LPNB-7069 |
| Russia | 1991 | Warner Bros. | LP | 1092MD/RGM 7028-1A/2 |
| South Africa | 1991 | Warner Bros./Tusk | Compact Disc | WBCD 1701 |
| South Korea | 1991 | Warner Bros. | LP | 7599-26496-1 |
| Zimbabwe | 1991 | Tusk | LP | WBC 1701 |
| Australia | 1991 | Warner Bros. | Compact Disc | 7599264962 |
| United States | 2005 | Warner Bros. | Compact Disc/DVD-Audio DualDisc | 73951 |
| Internet | 2011 | Warner Bros. | LPCM FLAC 96 kHz/24bit, LPCM FLAC 192 kHz /24bit | |

Note

- † Edition packaged with a bonus 7" single—"World Leader Pretend"/"Turn You Inside Out" from Tourfilm

Box sets

| Region | Date | Label | Format | Catalog | Notes |
|---|---|---|---|---|---|
| Australia | 1995 | Warner Bros. | Compact Disc box set | 9362460742 | Packaged with Green |

== See also ==
- List of best-selling albums in Germany

== Bibliography ==
- Black, Johnny. Reveal: The Story of R.E.M. Backbeat Books, 2004. ISBN 978-0-87930-776-9
- Rosen, Craig (1997). R.E.M. Inside Out: The Stories Behind Every Song. New York: Thunder's Mouth Press. ISBN 1-56025-177-8 – via the Internet Archive.
- Gray, Marcus (1997). It Crawled from the South: An R.E.M. Companion (2nd ed.). Da Capo. ISBN 0-306-80751-3 – via the Internet Archive.
