= Radio Song =

1991 song by R.E.M

Single by R.E.M.

from the album Out of Time
- B-side: "Love Is All Around" (live)
- Released: November 4, 1991
- Studio: Bearsville (Woodstock); John Keane (Athens, Georgia); Soundscape (Atlanta)
- Genre: Funk rock; rap rock; pop rock; jangle pop
- Length: 4:15
- Label: Warner Bros.
- Songwriters: Bill Berry; Peter Buck; Mike Mills; Michael Stipe
- Producers: Scott Litt; R.E.M.

R.E.M. singles chronology
"Near Wild Heaven" (1991)	"Radio Song" (1991)	"It's the End of the World as We Know It (And I Feel Fine)" (1991)

Music video
- "Radio Song" on YouTube

"Radio Song" is a song by American rock band R.E.M., released as the fourth single from their seventh album, Out of Time (1991), where it appears as the opening track. Lead singer Michael Stipe once said that he hoped everyone had enough sense of humor to realize that he was "kind of taking the piss of everyone," himself included. Stipe also asked KRS-One, leader of Boogie Down Productions (of which Stipe was a fan), to contribute to the track. He provides some backing vocals for the track, as well as a closing rap, and appears prominently in the video.

== Critical reception ==
Dele Fadele from NME named "Radio Song" Single of the Week, adding, "The most galvanising radio-wave song since Joy Division's 'Transmission' sees Messrs Berry, Buck and Mills pressure-cooking some dirty funk with poignant pauses ('radio silence' as an act of subversion)." Another NME editor, Terry Staunton, declared it as "predictably the most curious and out of character track, which switches from gentle Velvet Underground strumming to anxious funk workout."

Parry Gettelman from Orlando Sentinel named it one of the album's "strongest cuts" and "an adventurous amalgam of jangly funk and sugary-sweet pop balladry, with KRS-1 a good foil for otherworldly singer Michael Stipe." He added, "While Stipe is, as usual, a bit oblique ("I've everything to show/I've everything to hide/ look into my eyes - listen"), KRS-1's words are unambiguous ("Now our children grow up prisoners/all their life - radio listeners")." Celia Farber from Spin felt it's one of the few "that rocks out a little [on the album], settling intermittently on a classic dramatic R.E.M. moment, with a crescendo of arpeggiated guitars and words about the world collapsing."

== Track listings ==
All songs written by Bill Berry, Peter Buck, Mike Mills, and Michael Stipe unless otherwise indicated.

7-inch and cassette

1. "Radio Song" – 4:15
2. "Love Is All Around" (Reg Presley) (live)^{1} – 3:15

UK "Collectors' Edition" CD

1. "Radio Song" – 4:15
2. "You Are the Everything" (live)^{3} – 4:43
3. "Orange Crush" (live)² – 4:03
4. "Belong" (live)^{4} – 4:47

CD, 12-inch, and maxi-cassette

1. "Radio Song (Tower of Luv Bug mix)" – 4:14
2. "Love Is All Around" (Reg Presley) (live)^{1} – 3:15
3. "Belong" (live)^{4} – 4:07

UK and Germany 12-inch

1. "Radio Song" – 4:15
2. "Love Is All Around" (Reg Presley) (live)^{1} – 3:15
3. "Shiny Happy People (Music Mix)"

=== Notes ===
^{1} Recorded on Rockline, Los Angeles, California; April 1, 1991.
^{2} Incorrectly listed as "Fox Theater, Atlanta, Georgia; November 13, 1989"; actually from Miami Arena, Miami (FL), April 29, 1989.
^{3} Taken from the live performance video, Tourfilm.
^{4} Recorded at the Coliseum, Greensboro, North Carolina; November 10, 1989.

Details for the second and third live recordings (tracks three and four) for "Collectors' Edition" are not provided on the CD materials.

== Personnel ==
Personnel are taken from the Out of Time liner notes.

R.E.M.

- Bill Berry – drums, percussion
- Peter Buck – guitar
- Mike Mills – organ, bass guitar
- Michael Stipe – vocals

Additional musicians

- Peter Holsapple – bass guitar
- Kidd Jordan – baritone, tenor and alto saxophone
- KRS-One – rapping
- Scott Litt – echo-loop feed

Strings

- David Arenz – violin
- Ellie Arenz – violin
- Mark Bingham – string arrangement
- David Braitberg – violin
- Andrew Cox – cello
- Reid Harris – viola
- Ralph Jones – double bass
- Dave Kempers – violin
- Elizabeth Murphy – cello
- Paul Murphy – lead viola

== Charts ==
Chart (1991)	Peak position
Australia (ARIA)	105
Europe (Eurochart Hot 100)	53
Ireland (IRMA)	5
Netherlands (Dutch Top 40 Tipparade)	6
Netherlands (Single Top 100)	56
Portugal (AFP)	3
UK Singles (Official Charts)	28
UK Airplay (Music Week)	18
US Cash Box Top 100	75

== Release history ==
Region	Date	Format(s)	Label(s)	Ref.
United Kingdom	November 4, 1991	7-inch vinyl; 12-inch vinyl; CD	Warner Bros.	
Australia	November 11, 1991	Cassette	Warner Bros.	

== Bingo Hand Job version ==
A live version of "Radio Song" was released in early 2019 via Noisetrade. Recorded in 1991 at The Borderline in London, the track was credited to Bingo Hand Job, a pseudonym for R.E.M. and guests (who also adopted various fake names). A recording of the much bootlegged full concert was officially released in April 2019 as Live at the Borderline 1991.

== Use in other media ==
The song was featured in the Cameron Crowe film Singles (1992), although it is not included in the official soundtrack album.
