= Texarkana (song) =

1991 song performed by R.E.M.

- Promotional CD single

Promotional single by R.E.M.

from the album Out of Time
- Released: March 11, 1991
- Recorded: Late 1990
- Studio: Bearsville (Woodstock); John Keane (Athens, Georgia); Soundscape (Atlanta)
- Genre: Country rock
- Length: 3:37
- Label: Warner Bros.
- Songwriters: Bill Berry; Peter Buck; Mike Mills; Michael Stipe
- Producers: Scott Litt; R.E.M.

"Texarkana" is a song from R.E.M.'s studio album Out of Time. Though not released as an official single, it managed to chart at number 4 on the Modern Rock Tracks chart and number 7 on the Mainstream Rock Tracks chart. This song was written, musically and lyrically, by bassist Mike Mills (credited to Berry/Buck/Mills/Stipe), as vocalist Michael Stipe had been having problems for weeks trying to come up with lyrics for it. As a result, Mills also sang lead vocals.

The title is a reference to the region of Texarkana (located on the border of Texas and Arkansas), originally mentioned in the chorus before it was changed. As heard on the Outtakes of Time bootleg as well as Out of Time's 25th Anniversary edition, Stipe's original chorus was "When I'm out in Texarkana / where's that county line / another county line."

== Personnel ==
Personnel adapted from Out of Time liner notes

R.E.M.

- Bill Berry – drums, percussion
- Peter Buck – electric guitar
- Mike Mills – bass guitar, keyboard strings and arrangement, lead vocals
- Michael Stipe – backing vocals

Additional musicians

- Peter Holsapple – acoustic guitar
- John Keane – pedal steel guitar

Strings

- David Arenz – violin
- Ellie Arenz – violin
- Mark Bingham – string arrangements
- David Braitberg – violin
- Andrew Cox – cello
- Reid Harris – viola
- Ralph Jones – double bass
- Dave Kempers – violin
- Elizabeth Murphy – cello
- Paul Murphy – viola

== Charts ==
=== Weekly charts ===
Weekly chart performance for "Texarkana"
Chart (1991)	Peak position
US Alternative Airplay (Billboard)	4
US Mainstream Rock (Billboard)	7

=== Year-end charts ===
Year-end chart performance for "Texarkana"
Chart (1991)	Position
US Album Rock Tracks (Billboard)	49
