= Country Feedback =

Song by R.E.M.

Song by R.E.M.

from the album Out of Time
- Released: 11 March 1991
- Recorded: 1990
- Studio: Bearsville (Woodstock); John Keane (Athens, Georgia)
- Genre: Country rock
- Length: 4:07
- Label: Warner Bros.
- Songwriters: Bill Berry; Peter Buck; Mike Mills; Michael Stipe
- Producers: Scott Litt; R.E.M.

"Country Feedback" is a song by R.E.M. from their 1991 album Out of Time. The title describes the music (country rock-influenced, with feedback), rather than describing the song's lyrical content, a series of chaotic, disconnected and keening observations describing the state of mind of a protagonist contemplating the breakdown of a relationship. In 2016, Pitchfork described the track as "the rawest expression of sheer remorse the band ever captured on tape."

Michael Stipe has claimed that he did not even write the whole lyric down, that he "just had a piece of paper with a few words. I sang it and I walked out." The following day, the hastily improvised take was deemed good enough and it was not re-recorded. Peter Buck has gone even further to say that "it's exactly what was on his mind that day. It was real." Stipe has said at one concert that it is his favorite R.E.M. song.

The song is featured on the Perfect Square DVD from 2003, and opens with lyrics from "Chorus and the Ring" followed by Stipe's own additions of "instinct, gut, feeling, feelings". This performance was also added to the two-disc special edition version of the band's 2003 greatest hits CD, In Time, although the original 1990 recording was left off the main disc. The studio recording also appears on the 2011 career-spanning compilation Part Lies, Part Heart, Part Truth, Part Garbage 1982–2011.

In addition, live versions have appeared on a fan club single and the singles for "Bang and Blame" and "At My Most Beautiful". R.E.M have performed the song as part of the Bridge School benefit concerts series with Neil Young providing additional guitar.

== Personnel ==
R.E.M.

- Bill Berry – bass guitar, percussion, vocals
- Peter Buck – acoustic guitar, electric guitar
- Mike Mills – organ
- Michael Stipe – vocals

Additional musicians

- John Keane – pedal steel guitar
- Kate Pierson – vocals
