= The Power and the Glory (Bad Ends album) =

The Power and The Glory

Studio album by The Bad Ends
- Released: January 20, 2023
- Recorded: 2022
- Studio: Espresso Machine, Athens, Georgia, United States
- Genre: Alternative pop; college rock; jangle rock
- Length: 36:21
- Language: English
- Label: New West
- Producer: Mike Albanese, The Bad Ends

The Power and The Glory is a 2023 studio album from American rock band The Bad Ends. This debut release from the band has received positive critical reception.

== Recording and release ==
The project began when Bill Berry's former band R.E.M. toured with Five Eight, featuring Mike Mantione. The two met up occasionally over several years and eventually Mantione sent Berry demos of work that he intended for a solo album that led to the formation of the Bad Ends; Mantione had already recruited several other local musicians, but they lacked a drummer to give the songs cohesion. Leading up to the album, the group released the single "All Your Friends Are Dying" and performed a hometown show on November 27, 2022. Their debut represents the first album that Berry had worked on in over 20 years. A music video for "Mile Marker 29" debuted on The Late Show with Stephen Colbert on March 24, 2023.

== Reception ==
According to the review aggregator Metacritic, The Power and The Glory received "generally favorable reviews" based on a weighted average score of 79 out of 100 from five critic scores. The editorial staff of AllMusic Guide scored this album four out of five stars, with reviewer Stephen Thomas Erlewine praising the mature and introspective lyrics written by vocalist Mike Mantione with drummer Bill Berry's energetic approach. For American Songwriter, Lee Zimmerman notes the diversity of the musicianship on display and sums up his review that this album "bodes well for any future offerings that follow later on". Uncut's Stephen Deusner rated The Power and The Glory a nine out of 10 for "inventive" songs that explore aging and death with "immense compassion and concern".

== Track listing ==
All songs written by Bill Berry, Dave Domizi, Christian Lopez, Mike Mantione, and Geoff Melkonian, except where noted.

1. "Mile Marker 29" – 3:42
2. "All Your Friends Are Dying" (Berry, Dominzi, Lopez, Mantione, Melkonian, and Mike Rizzi) – 4:25
3. "Left to Be Found" – 4:56
4. "Thanksgiving 1915" – 3:21
5. "Ode to Jose" – 3:15
6. "The Ballad of Satan’s Bride" – 4:34
7. "Little Black Cloud" – 4:37
8. "Honestly" – 3:29
9. "New York Murder Suicide" – 4:02

== Personnel ==
The Bad Ends

- Bill Berry – drums, percussion, guitars, electric sitar, whistling, string arrangement for “Ode to Jose”, mixing, production
- Dave Domizi – bass guitar, backing vocals, cello, piano, mixing, production
- Christian Lopez – guitars, mandolin, banjo, mixing, production
- Mike Mantione – vocals, guitars, mixing, production
- Geoff Melkonian – keyboards, piano, backing vocals, guitars, violin, viola, glockenspiel, accordion, mixing, production

Additional musicians

- Mike Albanese – modular synth, recording, mixing production
- Sean Dunn – guitar on “New York Murder Suicide”
- Gladys – photography
- Joel Hatstat – mastering at High Jump Media, Athens, Georgia, United States
- John Neff – pedal steel guitar on “Ode to Jose” and “Little Black Cloud”
- Jeremy Ray – album art and layout

== See also ==
- List of 2023 albums
