= Shiny Happy People =

1991 single by R.E.M.

Single by R.E.M.

from the album Out of Time
- B-side: "Forty Second Song"
- Released: May 7, 1991
- Recorded: September–October 1990
- Studio: Bearsville (Woodstock, New York); John Keane (Athens, Georgia); Soundscape (Atlanta, Georgia)
- Genre: Jangle pop; pop rock; bubblegum pop
- Length: 3:45 (album version); 3:12 (radio edit)
- Label: Warner Bros.
- Songwriters: Bill Berry; Peter Buck; Mike Mills; Michael Stipe
- Producers: Scott Litt; R.E.M.

R.E.M. singles chronology
"Losing My Religion" (1991)	"Shiny Happy People" (1991)	"Near Wild Heaven" (1991)

Music video
- "Shiny Happy People" on YouTube

"Shiny Happy People" is a song by the American rock band R.E.M., released as the second single from their seventh studio album, Out of Time (1991). It features guest vocals by Kate Pierson of the B-52s, who also appears in the music video.

"Shiny Happy People" was released as a single in May 1991 in the United Kingdom by Warner Bros. Records. It reached number 10 on the US Billboard Hot 100, the fourth and last R.E.M. single to reach the top 10. It reached number six on the UK singles chart, becoming the first R.E.M. song to reach the top 10 in the UK and the only one to reach the top 10 in both countries. It is R.E.M.'s most successful song in Ireland, where it reached number two on the Irish Singles Chart, and in Germany, where it reached number 10. Its music video, directed by Katherine Dieckmann, was inspired by the 1948 movie Letter From an Unknown Woman.

R.E.M. performed the song with Pierson on a season 16 episode of Saturday Night Live on April 13, 1991.

== Music ==
"Shiny Happy People" is described as an accessible and optimistic pop song. It contains waltz-time strings, "rippling" guitars and "hippy" lyrics, and guest vocals from Kate Pierson. Pierson said she felt the song was an "homage" to her band, the B-52s. R.E.M. had already recorded the song when she arrived, and gave her no direction, telling her "do whatever you want".

R.E.M.'s lead singer, Michael Stipe, described "Shiny Happy People" as a "really fruity, kind of bubblegum song". Pierson interpreted the line "throw your love around" to mean "to share your love and grow your love with others. It's not mindless at all. It's a song about spreading love."

According to some reports, the phrase "shiny happy people" was taken from Chinese propaganda posters used after the 1989 Tiananmen Square protests and massacre. However, no statements from the band members have been found to support this. Pierson said the song was "supposed to be shiny and happy ... So I can't imagine that R.E.M. was thinking at the time, 'Oh, we want this song to be about Chinese government propaganda.'"

== Critical reception ==
Larry Flick of Billboard magazine wrote that "Shiny Happy People" took R.E.M. further into the mainstream. He praised Pierson's "splendid vocal harmonies" on the "infectious, sing-along" chorus. Richard Wagamese of the Calgary Herald felt Stipe "sounds almost ebullient on the bouncy 'Shiny Happy People' and that alone is radical. R.E.M.'s guitar foundation is also replaced by the occasional bass clarinet, cello, and flugelhorn." The Drogheda Independent declared it "unbelievably catchy", while Scottish Dundee Courier described it as "sardonic but delicious disposable pop". A reviewer from Evening Herald called it a "gilt-edged" pop hit. Liverpool Echo felt the song "comes at you concealed as bubble gum pop in the guise of an opening string arrangement even Kylie Minogue wouldn't thank you for—before it throws off the cloak of conformity and gets down to a more resonant rendition of power pop". In Melody Maker, David Fricke wrote that it contained a "bizarre" mix of features that "you can't but help but laugh along with", and Paul Lester wrote that it's "not one of their best".

Music & Media described the song as "heaven on earth", noting that Pierson's voice is as prominent as it was on Iggy Pop's song "Candy". Terry Staunton from NME complimented it as "a lilting waltz before breaking into a sun-drenched pop anthem, a warm and welcome blood relative to the B-52s' own 'Love Shack'." People wrote that Pierson added "spark". Mark Frith from Smash Hits wrote that the song is "very summery, optimistic and has some fine vocals" from Pierson. He added, "It's so good that it will make you too want to go around and give the world a great big hug. Summer's here and everything's groovy." Celia Farber from Spin found it was the most accessible song from Out of Time, noting the waltz-time break in the middle of the song as one of "the least R.E.M.-like stuff", that works best on the album. The Sunday Tribune felt that it "waltzes joyfully" with the added vocal attraction of Pierson, and noted the "joyous" and "celebratory" noises, calling it "one of 1991's pure pop highlights".

In a 2016 review, Justin Chadwick from Albumism described the song as "buoyant" and R.E.M.'s "most unabashedly pop-fueled composition of their career". He added further, "Regardless of the song's true inspirations or whether you care for the song or not, I suspect most can agree that the soaring backing vocals supplied by Kate Pierson ... are the unequivocal highlight." In 1998, the Daily Vault's Christopher Thelen said it's the song "that dared to show a new side of R.E.M. — a, well, happy side. Who woulda thunk it? The song is a tad cornball, but is infectiously catchy, nonetheless."

== Music video ==
The music video for "Shiny Happy People" was directed by Katherine Dieckmann. She was asked by the band to direct the video, and drew some inspiration from a scene in the 1948 film Letter From an Unknown Woman by Max Ophuls. In this scene, a couple goes to a carnival with a railroad car attraction. Rotating landscape backdrops roll past their "window", and eventually we learn they're propelled by an old man pedaling a stationary bicycle behind the scenes. Dieckmann wanted to re-create this situation, using a large children's painting for the moving mural. Stipe suggested that she contact a friend, schoolteacher April Chapman, to have her fifth-grade class create the painted backdrop. The dancing in the video was choreographed by Stipe.

Kate Pierson collaborated on the design for the custom red unitard dress she wore in the music video and kept it afterward, wearing it again for the band's performance of the song on Saturday Night Live.

== Legacy ==
In its 2006 "Song of the Summer" countdown, CBC Radio's Freestyle named "Shiny Happy People" 1991's "Song of the Summer". By contrast, in 2006, the song received the No. 1 position on AOL Music's list of the "111 Wussiest Songs of All Time". Blender magazine also ranked the song No. 35 on its list of the "50 Worst Songs Ever", and Q included it in a list of "Ten Terrible Records by Great Artists" in 2005.

When Stipe made an appearance on Space Ghost Coast to Coast in 1995, he told Space Ghost he hated the song. It was one of their few Warner-released singles not included on their 2003 greatest hits album In Time, and R.E.M. have rarely played it. However, over time, Stipe's position on the song has softened. Speaking in 2011, Stipe said he was "always at peace" with it, but that it was "embarrassing" that it had become a hit. He said:

Many people's idea of R.E.M, and me in particular, is very serious, with me being a very serious kind of poet. But I'm also actually quite funny – hey, my bandmates think so, my family thinks so, my boyfriend thinks so, so I must be – but that doesn't always come through in the music.... (But) I'm in 'Shiny Happy People', 'Stand', 'Pop Song 89', 'Get Up', too. Our fruitloop songs!

In 2024, Mike Mills stated: "It started out as not the bubblegum epic that it became. I wrote the thing on acoustic guitar. We made it a song about kids. It's for kids. It's a great song, I'm proud of it, we don't hate it."

== Track listings ==
All songs were written by Bill Berry, Peter Buck, Mike Mills, and Michael Stipe unless otherwise stated.

- US and UK 7-inch and cassette single
1. "Shiny Happy People" (album version) – 3:44
2. "Forty Second Song" – 1:20
- UK 12-inch and CD single
1. "Shiny Happy People" – 3:45
2. "Forty Second Song" – 1:20
3. "Losing My Religion" (live acoustic version, recorded on Rockline, April 1, 1991.) – 4:36
- UK limited-edition CD single
1. "Shiny Happy People" – 3:45
2. "I Remember California" (live, from Tourfilm) – 5:42
3. "Get Up" (live, from Tourfilm) – 3:15
4. "Pop Song '89" (live, from Tourfilm) – 3:30

== Personnel ==
Personnel taken from the Out of Time liner notes.

R.E.M.

- Bill Berry – drums, percussion
- Peter Buck – electric guitar
- Mike Mills – bass guitar, vocals, organ
- Michael Stipe – vocals

Additional musicians

- Peter Holsapple – acoustic guitar
- Kate Pierson – vocals

Strings

- David Arenz – violin
- Ellie Arenz – violin
- Mark Bingham – string arrangements
- David Braitberg – violin
- Andrew Cox – cello
- Reid Harris – viola
- Ralph Jones – double bass
- Dave Kempers – violin
- Elizabeth Murphy – cello
- Paul Murphy – viola

== Charts ==
=== Weekly charts ===
Weekly chart performance for "Shiny Happy People"
Chart (1991)	Peak position
Australia (ARIA)	19
Austria (Ö3 Austria Top 40)	14
Belgium (Ultratop 50 Flanders)	8
Canada Top Singles (RPM)	3
Europe (Eurochart Hot 100)	16
Europe (European Hit Radio)	7
Finland (Suomen virallinen lista)	12
France (SNEP)	10
Germany (GfK)	10
Ireland (IRMA)	2
Israel (Israeli Singles Chart)	1
Luxembourg (Radio Luxembourg)	1
Netherlands (Dutch Top 40)	10
Netherlands (Single Top 100)	13
New Zealand (Recorded Music NZ)	29
Norway (VG-lista)	10
Sweden (Sverigetopplistan)	14
UK Singles (Official Charts)	6
UK Airplay (Music Week)	9
US Billboard Hot 100	10
US Adult Contemporary (Billboard)	48
US Alternative Airplay (Billboard)	3
US Mainstream Rock (Billboard)	8
US Cash Box Top 100	8

=== Year-end charts ===
Year-end chart performance for "Shiny Happy People"
Chart (1991)	Position
Belgium (Ultratop)	62
Canada Top Singles (RPM)	29
Europe (Eurochart Hot 100)	66
Europe (European Hit Radio)	36
Germany (Media Control)	37
Israel (Israeli Singles Chart)	9
Italy (Musica e dischi)	69
Sweden (Topplistan)	87
UK Singles (OCC)	69
US Billboard Hot 100	100

== Certifications ==
Certifications for "Shiny Happy People"
Region	Certification	Certified units/sales
Italy (FIMI)	Gold	35,000^{‡}
New Zealand (RMNZ)	Platinum	30,000^{‡}
Spain (Promusicae)	Platinum	60,000^{‡}
United Kingdom (BPI)	Platinum	600,000^{‡}
^{‡} Sales+streaming figures based on certification alone.

=== Release history ===
Release dates and formats for "Shiny Happy People"
Region	Date	Format(s)	Label(s)	Ref.
United Kingdom	May 7, 1991	7-inch vinyl; 12-inch vinyl; 2× CD	Warner Bros.	
Australia	May 27, 1991	7-inch vinyl; 12-inch vinyl; CD1; cassette	Warner Bros.	
Australia	June 24, 1991	CD2	Warner Bros.	
