= Losing My Religion =

1991 single by R.E.M

Single by R.E.M.

from the album Out of Time
- B-side: "Rotary Eleven"
- Released: February 19, 1991
- Recorded: September–October 1990
- Studio: Bearsville (Woodstock, New York); John Keane (Athens, Georgia); Soundscape (Atlanta, Georgia)
- Genre: Alternative rock; folk rock; pop rock
- Length: 4:28
- Label: Warner Bros.
- Songwriters: Bill Berry; Peter Buck; Mike Mills; Michael Stipe
- Producers: Scott Litt; R.E.M.

R.E.M. singles chronology
"Get Up" (1989)	"Losing My Religion" (1991)	"Shiny Happy People" (1991)

Audio sample
- file; help

Music video
- "Losing My Religion" on YouTube

"Losing My Religion" is a song by American alternative rock band R.E.M., released on February 19, 1991, by Warner Bros. Records as the first single from their seventh album, Out of Time (1991). It developed from a mandolin riff improvised by the guitarist, Peter Buck, inspired by the theme from Merry Christmas Mr. Lawrence. The lyrics, written by the singer, Michael Stipe, concern disillusionment and unrequited love.

"Losing My Religion" is R.E.M.'s highest-charting hit in the United States, reaching No. 4 on the Billboard Hot 100 and expanding their popularity. Its music video, directed by Tarsem Singh, features religious imagery. At the 1992 Grammy Awards, "Losing My Religion" won Best Short Form Music Video and Best Pop Performance by a Duo or Group with Vocal. Its video won awards for Video of the Year, Best Group Video, Breakthrough Video, Best Art Direction, Best Direction, and Best Editing at the 1991 MTV Video Music Awards. It was inducted into the Grammy Hall of Fame in 2017, and Rolling Stone ranked it at number 112 in its 2024 list of the "500 Greatest Songs of All Time". In 2020, "Losing My Religion" became the first R.E.M. video to reach one billion views on YouTube.

== Recording ==
The R.E.M. guitarist, Peter Buck, wrote the main riff and chorus for "Losing My Religion" on a mandolin. He had recently bought it and was learning how to play, recording as he practiced while watching television. Buck said that "when I listened back to it the next day, there was a bunch of stuff that was really just me learning how to play mandolin, and then there's what became 'Losing My Religion', and then a whole bunch more of me learning to play the mandolin". He said he likely would not have written the chord progression in the same way had he not played it on mandolin.

In July 1990, R.E.M. recorded a demo version with the working title "Sugar Cane" in a studio in Athens, Georgia, featuring banjo and Hammond organ. Mike Mills wrote a bassline inspired by the Fleetwood Mac bassist John McVie. The final version was recorded in September at Bearsville Studio A in Woodstock, New York.

Finding the song lacked midrange between the bass and mandolin, R.E.M. enlisted the touring guitarist Peter Holsapple on acoustic guitar. Buck said, "It was really cool: Peter and I would be in our little booth, sweating away, and Bill and Mike would be out there in the other room going at it. It just had a really magical feel." Michael Stipe recorded his vocals in a single take. The strings, arranged by Mark Bingham, were performed by members of the Atlanta Symphony Orchestra at Soundscape Studios in Atlanta, Georgia, in October 1990.

== Composition and lyrics ==
"Losing My Religion" is in natural minor. It is based on Buck's mandolin melody, which was inspired by the theme from the 1983 film Merry Christmas, Mr. Lawrence. Buck said, "I had seen the movie, and the riff stuck with me. It was perfect for connecting the song’s descending chords that shifted from minor to major."

Buck felt that the song was the most "typical" R.E.M. song on the album, saying "The verses are the kinds of things R.E.M. uses a lot, going from one minor to another, kind [of] like those 'Driver 8' chords. You can't really say anything bad about E minor, A minor, D, and G ... We are trying to get away from those kind of songs, but like I said before, those are some good chords."

The title phrase is an expression from the Southern United States that means "losing one's temper or civility" or "feeling frustrated and desperate". Stipe said the song was about romantic expression and unrequited love. The lines "That's me in the corner / That's me in the spotlight" were originally "That's me in the corner / That's me in the kitchen", describing a person at a social event too shy to approach the person they like. Stipe compared the theme to "Every Breath You Take" (1983) by the Police, saying, "It's just a classic obsession pop song. I've always felt the best kinds of songs are the ones where anybody can listen to it, put themselves in it and say, 'Yeah, that's me.'"

== Music video ==
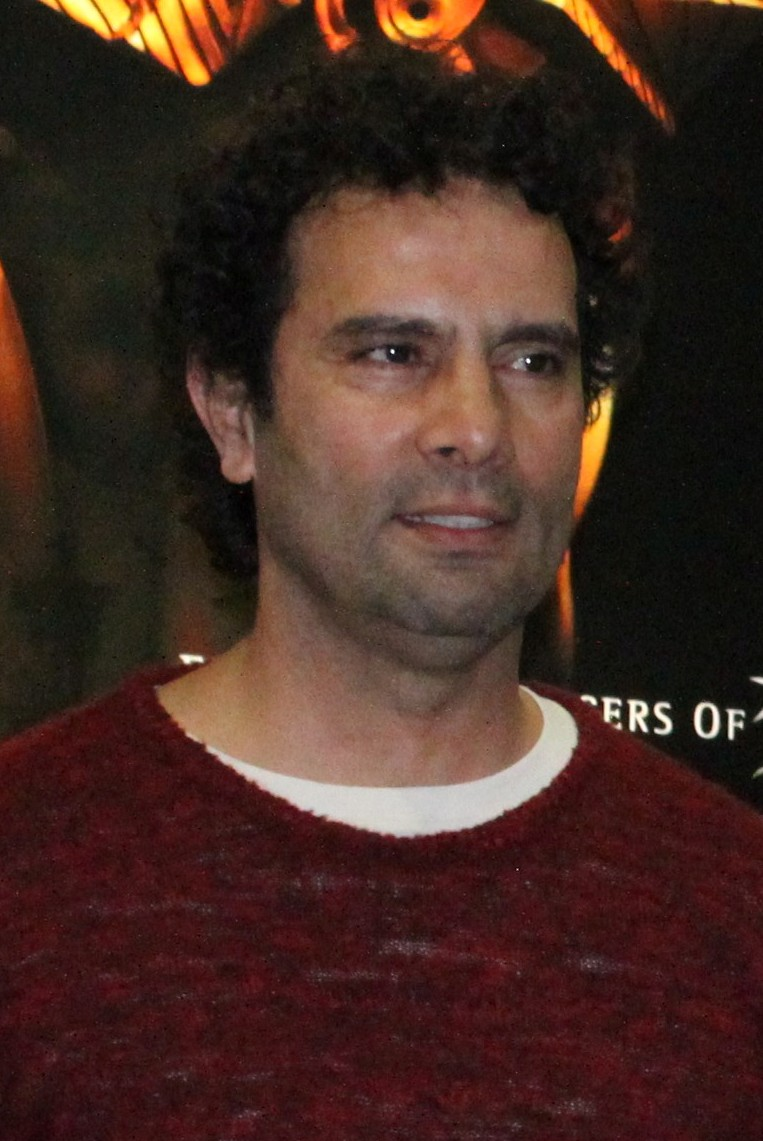
The music video was directed by Tarsem Singh.

The music video for "Losing My Religion" was directed by the Indian filmmaker Tarsem Singh. Unlike previous R.E.M. videos, Stipe agreed to lip-sync the lyrics. The video begins inside a dark room where water drips from an open window. Recreating a scene from the Andrei Tarkovsky film The Sacrifice, Buck, Berry, and Mills run across the room while Stipe remains seated as a pitcher of milk drops from the windowsill and shatters.

The video originated as a combination of ideas envisioned by Stipe and Singh. Stipe wanted a straightforward performance video, akin to Sinéad O'Connor's "Nothing Compares 2 U". Singh wanted to create a video in the style of a certain type of Indian filmmaking, where everything would be "melodramatic and very dreamlike", according to Stipe. Singh said the video was modeled after the Gabriel García Márquez short story "A Very Old Man with Enormous Wings", in which an angel crashes into a town and the villagers have varied reactions to him. He also drew inspiration from the Italian painter Caravaggio, and the video uses religious imagery such as Saint Sebastian, the Biblical episode of the Incredulity of Thomas, and Hindu deities, portrayed in a series of tableaux. The actor Wade Dominguez appears in the video.

The "Losing My Religion" video was nominated in nine categories at the 1991 MTV Video Music Awards and won for Video of the Year, Best Group Video, Breakthrough Video, Best Art Direction, Best Direction, and Best Editing. It ranked second in the music video category of the 1991 Pazz & Jop poll. In September 2020, "Losing My Religion" became the first R.E.M. video to reach one billion views on YouTube.

== Release and promotion ==
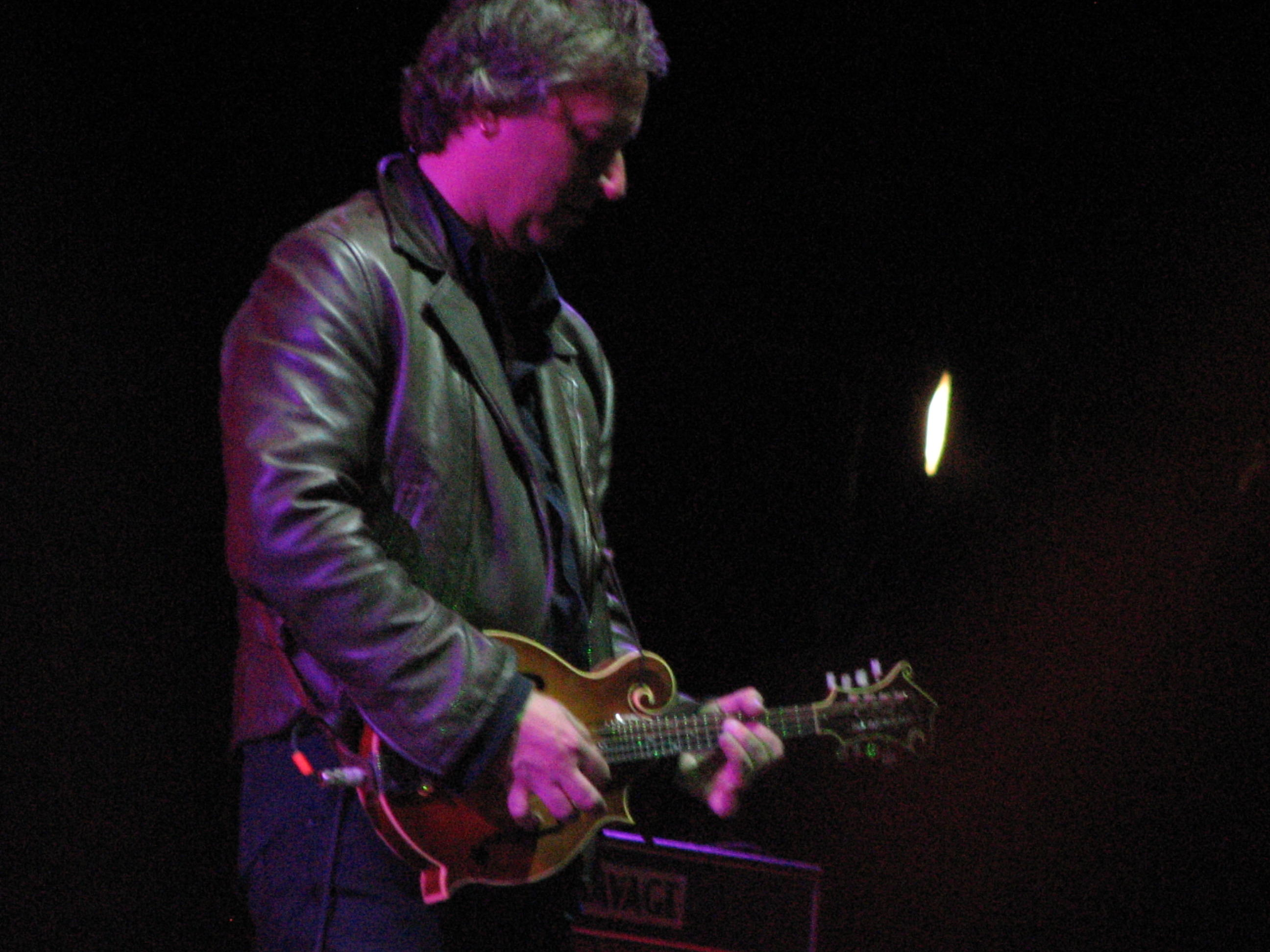
Buck performing "Losing My Religion" on mandolin

"Losing My Religion" was released on February 19, 1991, in the United States as the lead single from R.E.M.'s album Out of Time. Their record label, Warner Bros., was wary of the choice of lead single. Steven Baker, then the vice president of product management., said there were "long, drawn-out discussions" about releasing such an "unconventional track" as the single until the label agreed.

R.E.M. did not tour to promote Out of Time, but visited radio stations, gave press interviews and made television appearances. On November 10, 1991, R.E.M. performed "Losing My Religion" with members of the Atlanta Symphony Orchestra to celebrate the tenth anniversary of MTV. It was recorded at the Madison Morgan Cultural Centre in Madison, Georgia, about 20 miles south of Athens.

Warner Bros. worked to establish "Losing My Religion" at campus, modern rock, and album-oriented rock radio stations before promoting it to American Top 40 stations, where it became a success. According to one program director, "Losing My Religion" was "a hard record to program; you can't play L.L. Cool J behind it. But it's a real pop record—you can dance to it." He said it "crosses the boundaries of just being an alternative record".

"Losing My Religion" became R.E.M.'s biggest hit in the US, reaching No. 4 on the Billboard Hot 100. It stayed on the chart for 21 weeks. It topped the Billboard Album Rock Tracks chart for three weeks and the Modern Rock Tracks chart for eight weeks, the best performance of any R.E.M. song on either chart. It reached number 19 on the UK singles chart, No. 16 in Canada and No. 11 in Australia.

With "Losing My Religion", R.E.M. crossed over into mainstream pop culture. Asked if he was worried the success might alienate older fans, Buck told Rolling Stone, "The people that changed their minds because of 'Losing My Religion' can just kiss my ass." Mills said R.E.M. understood they had a worldwide hit when they heard it on local radio in the jungle of Paraguay. Years later, Mills said: "Without 'Losing My Religion', Out of Time would have sold two or three million [copies], instead of the ten [million copies] or so it did. But the phenomenon that is a worldwide hit is an odd thing to behold. Basically that record was a hit in almost every civilised country in the world."

== Reception ==
Caren Myers from Melody Maker named the song "Single of the Week", writing that it "occupies a smaller, more intimate space, delicately picking a path with mandolins and acoustic guitars, soothed by the mournful sweep of a string section. Deceptive echoes of 'World Leader Pretend' dissolve on second listen as the song wraps itself around the impossibility of communication with glancing but painful accuracy. Stipe's writing is getting sparser and more intense, riddled with oblique insights but unwilling to point out where. This is R.E.M. at their most tender and unsettling, Stipe's careworn voice filled with inexplicable sadness, but as warm and familiar as ever." A reviewer from Music & Media wrote: "Hearing such a beautiful song with a striking mandolin arrangement, provides an ample religious substitute." Terry Staunton from NME found that it "is likely to be read as self-reflection on R.E.M.'s position in the worldwide musical scheme of things, doubt and discomfort at the prospect of unwanted disciples".

Parry Gettelman from Orlando Sentinel wrote that R.E.M. had returned to its "trademark jangle", and that "Stipe touches again on what seems to be ambivalence about his role as a pop star, and about the need to communicate with an audience". David Fricke from Rolling Stone felt that "there is melancholy in the air: in the doleful strings and teardrop mandolin". Celia Farber from Spin praised it as "a gorgeous, gorgeous song" and said "I actually get a hot/cold flash and have to play the song about 30 more times" when she hears the opening lyrics.

"Losing My Religion" placed second in the Village Voice Pazz & Jop annual critics' poll, behind Nirvana's "Smells Like Teen Spirit". At the 1992 Grammy Awards, it earned several nominations, including Record of the Year and Song of the Year, and won for Best Pop Performance by a Duo or Group with Vocals and Best Short Form Music Video. In 2007, VH1 named it the ninth-best song of the 90s, and in 2009, Blender ranked it No. 79 on its list of the "500 Greatest Songs Since You Were Born". The Rock and Roll Hall of Fame included it in its 2004 list of "500 Songs that Shaped Rock and Roll". In 2004, Rolling Stone listed "Losing My Religion" at No. 169 on its list of the "500 Greatest Songs of All Time", writing that "never before had Michael Stipe sounded so vulnerable, yearning, and articulate". It ranked it at No. 112 in its updated 2024 list.

In June 2026, CBS News included the song in its list of the 250 essential American songs of the past 250 years.

== Personnel ==
Personnel are adapted from the Out of Time liner notes.

R.E.M.

- Bill Berry – drums, percussion
- Peter Buck – mandolin, electric guitar
- Mike Mills – bass guitar, backing vocals, keyboard strings and arrangement
- Michael Stipe – lead vocals

Additional musician

- Peter Holsapple – acoustic guitar

Strings

- Mark Bingham – string arrangements
- David Arenz – violin
- Ellie Arenz – violin
- David Braitberg – violin
- Andrew Cox – cello
- Reid Harris – viola
- Ralph Jones – double bass
- Dave Kempers – violin
- Elizabeth Murphy – cello
- Paul Murphy – viola

== Track listing ==
All songs were written by Bill Berry, Peter Buck, Mike Mills, and Michael Stipe except where noted.

7-inch

1. "Losing My Religion" – 4:29
2. "Rotary Eleven" – 2:32

12-inch and compact disc

1. "Losing My Religion" – 4:29
2. "Rotary Eleven" – 2:32
3. "After Hours" (Lou Reed) (Live)^{1} – 2:08

UK "Collector's Edition" CD one

1. "Losing My Religion" – 4:29
2. "Stand" (Live)^{1} – 3:21
3. "Turn You Inside-Out" (Live)^{1} – 4:23
4. "World Leader Pretend" (Live)^{1} – 4:24

UK "Collector's Edition" CD two

1. "Losing My Religion" – 4:29
2. "Fretless" – 4:51
3. "Losing My Religion" (Live acoustic version/Rockline) – 4:38
4. "Rotary Eleven" – 2:32

Notes

- 1. Taken from the live performance video, Tourfilm.

== Charts ==
=== Weekly charts ===
1991 weekly chart performance for "Losing My Religion"
Chart (1991)	Peak position
Australia (ARIA)	11
Austria (Ö3 Austria Top 40)	6
Belgium (Ultratop 50 Flanders)	1
Canada Top Singles (RPM)	6
Canada Adult Contemporary (RPM)	17
Denmark (IFPI)	9
Europe (Eurochart Hot 100)	14
Europe (European Hit Radio)	8
France (SNEP)	3
Ireland (IRMA)	5
Italy (Musica e dischi)	8
Luxembourg (Radio Luxembourg)	5
Netherlands (Dutch Top 40)	1
Netherlands (Single Top 100)	1
New Zealand (Recorded Music NZ)	16
Norway (VG-lista)	4
Sweden (Sverigetopplistan)	3
Switzerland (Schweizer Hitparade)	11
UK Singles (Official Charts)	19
UK Airplay (Music Week)	8
US Billboard Hot 100	4
US Adult Contemporary (Billboard)	28
US Alternative Airplay (Billboard)	1
US Mainstream Rock Airplay (Billboard)	1
US Cash Box Top 100	6

2008 weekly chart performance for "Losing My Religion"
Chart (2008)	Peak position
Italy (FIMI)	14

2013 weekly chart performance for "Losing My Religion"
Chart (2013)	Peak position
Slovenia Airplay (SloTop50)	14

2015 weekly chart performance for "Losing My Religion"
Chart (2015)	Peak position
Poland Airplay (ZPAV)	88

2025–2026 weekly chart performance for "Losing My Religion"
Chart (2025–2026)	Peak position
Finland Airplay (Radiosoittolista)	61
Global Excl. US (Billboard)	186
Greece International (IFPI)	41
Israel International Airplay (Media Forest)	13
Norway Airplay (IFPI Norge)	53
Portugal (AFP)	106

=== Year-end charts ===
1991 year-end chart performance for "Losing My Religion"
Chart (1991)	Position
Australia (ARIA)	54
Austria (Ö3 Austria Top 40)	24
Belgium (Ultratop)	12
Canada Top Singles (RPM)	28
Europe (Eurochart Hot 100)	22
Europe (European Hit Radio)	54
Italy (Musica e dischi)	47
Netherlands (Dutch Top 40)	7
Netherlands (Single Top 100)	4
Sweden (Topplistan)	20
US Billboard Hot 100	33
US Album Rock Tracks (Billboard)	6
US Modern Rock Tracks (Billboard)	9
US Cash Box Top 100	39

2025 year-end chart performance for "Losing My Religion"
Chart (2025)	Position
Argentina Anglo Airplay (Monitor Latino)	67

== Certifications ==
Certifications and sales for "Losing My Religion"
Region	Certification	Certified units/sales
Brazil (Pro-Música Brasil)	Platinum	60,000^{‡}
Denmark (IFPI Danmark)	2× Platinum	180,000^{‡}
France (SNEP)	Silver	125,000^{*}
Germany (BVMI)	Platinum	600,000^{‡}
Italy (FIMI)	3× Platinum	300,000^{‡}
New Zealand (RMNZ)	5× Platinum	150,000^{‡}
Portugal (AFP)	4× Platinum	40,000^{‡}
Spain (Promusicae)	3× Platinum	180,000^{‡}
United Kingdom (BPI)	3× Platinum	1,800,000^{‡}
United States (RIAA) Physical single	Gold	500,000^{^}
United States (RIAA) Digital single	Platinum	1,000,000^{‡}
Streaming
Greece (IFPI Greece)	3× Platinum	6,000,000^{†}
^{*} Sales figures based on certification alone.^{^} Shipments figures based on certification alone.^{‡} Sales+streaming figures based on certification alone.^{†} Streaming-only figures based on certification alone.

== Release history ==
Release dates and formats for "Losing My Religion"
Region	Date	Format(s)	Label(s)	Ref.
Europe	February 19, 1991	7-inch vinyl; 12-inch vinyl; CD	Warner Bros.	
United States	February 19, 1991	7-inch vinyl; cassette	Warner Bros.	
United Kingdom	February 25, 1991	7-inch vinyl; 12-inch vinyl; CD; cassette	Warner Bros.	
Australia	March 11, 1991	7-inch vinyl; cassette	Warner Bros.	
Australia	March 18, 1991	CD	Warner Bros.	
Australia	April 1, 1991	12-inch vinyl	Warner Bros.	

== Covers ==
Finn Hudson (Cory Monteith) covered the song in the 2010 Glee episode "Grilled Cheesus". The song reached number 60 on the US on the Billboard Hot 100 and number 47 on the Canadian Hot 100. American heavy metal band Trivium covered the song on their 2013 album Vengeance Falls. Canadian singer-songwriter Dan Mangan covered the song on his 2020 album Thief. Hootie & the Blowfish covered the song for the 2020 reissue of their 2019 album Imperfect Circle. In a 2020 interview, guitarist Mark Bryan emphasized how influential R.E.M. had been in the band's development.

== Bibliography ==
- Black, Johnny. Reveal: The Story of R.E.M. Backbeat Books, 2004. ISBN 978-0-87930-776-9
- Buckley, David. R.E.M.: Fiction: An Alternative Biography. Virgin, 2002. ISBN 978-1-85227-927-1
