= Bill Berry =

American drummer (born 1958)

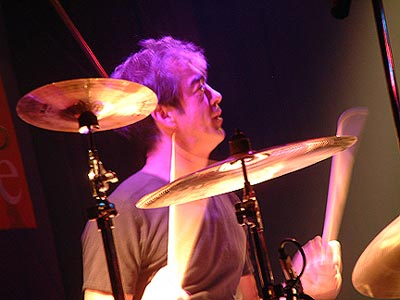
- Berry in 2011

Background information
- Born: William Thomas Berry; July 31, 1958 (age 68); Duluth, Minnesota, U.S.
- Genres: Alternative rock; folk rock; college rock; jangle pop
- Instruments: Drums; percussion; vocals
- Years active: 1980–1997; 2022–present
- Member of: The Bad Ends
- Formerly of: R.E.M.

William Thomas Berry (born July 31, 1958) is an American musician who was the drummer for the alternative rock band R.E.M. Although best known for his economical drumming style, Berry also played other instruments, including guitar, bass guitar and piano, both for songwriting and on R.E.M. albums. In 1995, Berry suffered a ruptured cerebral aneurysm onstage and collapsed. After a successful recovery, he left the music industry two years later to become a farmer, and has since maintained a low profile, making sporadic reunions with R.E.M. and appearing on other artists' recordings. His departure made him the only member of the band not to remain with them during their entire run. Berry eventually returned to the industry in 2022.

== Early years (1958–1980) ==
William Thomas Berry was born on July 31, 1958, in Duluth, Minnesota, the fifth child of Don and Anna Berry. At the age of three, Berry moved with his family to Wauwatosa, Wisconsin, a suburb of Milwaukee, where they remained for the next seven years. In 1968, they moved again, this time to Sandusky, Ohio.

In 1972, the Berry family made their final move, to Macon, Georgia, just in time for Bill to start high school at Northeast High School. It was there that he met bass guitarist Mike Mills, and they played together in several different bands, including Shadowfax. Their first attempt at a career in music was short-lived. He and Mills decided to make money by getting day jobs. They rented an apartment on Arlington Place in Macon, and Bill landed a job at the Paragon Booking Agency next door.

Berry and Mills moved to Athens, Georgia, in late 1978, where they met Michael Stipe and Peter Buck. Prior to dropping out, Berry studied pre-law at the University of Georgia.

== R.E.M. years (1980–1997) ==
R.E.M. was formed in 1980. In addition to his duties as a drummer, Berry contributed occasional guitar, bass, mandolin, vocals, keyboards and piano on studio tracks. In concert, he sometimes performed on bass, and supplied regular backing vocals. Berry also made notable songwriting contributions, particularly for "Everybody Hurts" and "Man on the Moon", both from Automatic for the People. Other Berry songs included "Perfect Circle", "Driver 8", "Cant Get There from Here" and "I Took Your Name". The song "Leave" was also written by Berry for R.E.M.'s album New Adventures in Hi-Fi (1996), which was his last album with the band.

Berry was also responsible for toning down the lyrics of the song "Welcome to the Occupation." Stipe's original lyric was "hang your freedom fighters" which, given the Reagan administration's active support for the Nicaraguan contra "freedom fighters", sounded violent and militant, although Stipe himself countered that the line could be taken multiple ways ("hang" as in either "lynch" or "frame on a wall"). Berry's objection ultimately led the line to be changed to "hang your freedom higher."

"A lot of [Bill's] stuff is under under-known, under-appreciated, under-rated," said Mills in 2024. "He's a great singer; he comes up with some amazing melodies that I would never have thought of, and ways to sing it that I would never have thought of."

During 1984, Berry also was drummer for the impromptu Hindu Love Gods, which featured his R.E.M. bandmates Peter Buck, Mike Mills, rocker Warren Zevon, and Bryan Cook.

=== On-stage collapse and leaving R.E.M. (1995–1997) ===
On March 1, 1995, at the Patinoire Auditorium in Lausanne, Switzerland, Berry collapsed on stage during an R.E.M. show from a ruptured brain aneurysm. He recovered and rejoined the band, but left in October 1997, saying that he no longer had the drive or enjoyment level to be in the band, and that he wanted to not travel. He later explained on VH-1's Behind the Music:

I didn't wake up one day and decide, "I just can't stand these guys anymore" or anything. I feel like I'm ready for a life change. I'm still young enough that I can do something else. I've been pounding the tubs since I was nine years old ... I'm ready to do something else.

Acquiescing to Berry's wishes, R.E.M. announced that it would reluctantly continue as a three-piece outfit. They continued to tour with several accompanying musicians, including long-time sidemen Ken Stringfellow and Scott McCaughey and employed Joey Waronker and Bill Rieflin as live drummers over the next decade.

In 2024, when asked if he regretted leaving the band, Berry said: "Of course I did. That was a weird time for me. And I made it weird for these guys too." He added that his aneurysm lowered his energy level. "I was Type A, hyperactive, until that. And I just didn’t have the drive I once did to do this. I didn't regret [leaving] at the time; I sort of regretted it a little later."

== Semi-retirement (1997–2022) ==
Berry left the music business and became a farmer, working on his hay farm in Farmington, Georgia, near Athens in late 1997.

Prior to the group's induction into the Rock and Roll Hall of Fame, Berry granted his first interview in several years, discussing life after retirement. "It's a great chance to get back together and perform with R.E.M., which I always loved doing", he said.

Asked where he goes on vacations, in an interview at his home in 2019, Berry stated: "I would never go on vacation. Vacation for me is right here. I spent enough time in airports and in vans and on buses. I kind of like sitting still for a while. Still haven't grown tired of that." He ventures into Athens to "see shows I want; I don't just go out and hang out at bars." He added: "I get into shows about 1.6 times a month: maybe not twice a month, but more than once."

Berry maintains that he never enjoyed being a drummer. "It's just not the most musical instrument. I've never written a song on a set of drums." His preferred instrument is the acoustic guitar, which (as of 2019) is something he plays every day. "I wish I'd played more of it before I retired. I've done most of my practicing after I've retired. I've become a pretty good guitarist now; I wasn't then."

His musical activities after leaving R.E.M. have been sporadic, but did include recording for the Tourette Syndrome Charity Album Welcome Companions in 2000. On May 11, 2018, he performed at the Winterville Auditorium in Winterville, Georgia, as part of a quintet named Mayor Ferrelle and the Councilmen, formed by the band's vocalist and lead guitarist, city mayor Dodd Ferrelle. The other three members were John Kean, David Barbe and Adam Poulin.

Berry appeared in the 2020 Song Exploder documentary about the band's song "Losing My Religion", even playing part of his drum line from the song. In the same documentary, Peter Buck says, "There's no drummer like Bill Berry on Earth. None. I have a lot of drummer friends, and they all ask me the same thing: 'What's his secret?' And I can't tell you, because I don't know. My theory is that he uses the space between the high hat and the snare drum in a kind of disco-y way, without being too disco."

In 1999, Joey Waronker explained the process of how he learned Berry's drum parts. He had learned around fifty of R.E.M.'s songs. "I think we have about 40 that we’re rotating amongst. I had to make a book — just notes — on every song. It's really, really subtle rhythmically. There's a lot going on, and I never noticed it. I'm a drummer, and never picked up on it. I was listening to the songs, saying, 'These are definitely not straightforward.'"

== Return to the music industry (2022–present) ==
In 2022, 25 years after his departure from R.E.M., Berry formed a new supergroup called The Bad Ends with Athens- and Atlanta-based musicians. Mike Mantione of Five Eight on guitar and vocals, Dave Domizi on bass and vocals, Geoff Melkonian on keyboards and vocals, Christian Lopez on guitars and mandolin, and Berry on drums and backing vocals. The origins of the group are a chance meeting between Mike Mantione and Berry on a street in Athens. Mantione had recently been described by Peter Buck as "the unsung hero of Athens rock and roll" and offered Berry "an opportunity to play in the game again", as in playing music professionally.

The group have released one single and video called "All Your Friends Are Dying" and performed a hometown show on November 27, 2022. They released their debut album, The Power and the Glory, on January 20, 2023.

On February 8, 2024, Berry joined the Michael Shannon / Jason Narducy band on stage at the 40 Watt Club in Athens to perform the piano part in "Perfect Circle", the song that R.E.M. had resumed performing and dedicated to Berry after he left the band in the late 1990s. On February 27 and 28, 2025, Berry made appearances throughout Shannon and Narducy's performances at 40 Watt Club, including tambourine on "Pretty Persuasion" with all three other members of R.E.M.

== Personal life ==
On March 22, 1986, Berry married girlfriend Mari Berry. They divorced in 1997. When crack began to infiltrate Athens in the early 1990s, the couple moved to nearby Farmington. "In 1988, I decided that I would broaden my portfolio, which was pretty slim back then. It's not like I was rolling in dough," he explained in 2019. "I wanted to buy land and found this spot. It's sixty acres, and it's far enough outside of town that it was cheap. It was, like, $2,000/acre back in '88. Land's more like $10–$12,000 now. It was strictly an investment; I was going to sell it later." His farm, which includes sheep, is at the north end of his property. A caretaker works on the farm; Berry does not anymore. He has a garden, but his caretaker also looks after that. "I get the rewards of it, but he does all the work."

In 2003, Berry and Cybele Lange had a son.

Berry was an avid golfer while a member of R.E.M.

== Discography ==
=== Without members of R.E.M. ===
Artist	Release	Year	Role	Notes
13111	"My Bible Is the Latest TV Guide"/"Things I'd Like to Say"	1989	Solo project	Solo single released by Jefferson Holt's Dog Gone Records in 1989. The a-side is a Berry original credited to "Stashus Mute"; the b-side is a cover of the New Colony Six song from the album Revelations (1968). "13111" is intended to look like "Bill" in digits.
The Bad Ends	The Power and the Glory	January 20, 2023	Drummer	
Bill Berry	n/a	December 17, 1997	Drums	Berry drummed with friends at a charity event for Tourette Syndrome at the Morton Theatre. After the show, he auctioned off his drum set.
Bill Berry	"Riviera Nap"	2000	Co-writing, drums	Berry and fellow Athenian Davis Causey contributed this song to the Tourette Syndrome benefit compilation Welcome Companions in the summer of 2000. He also drummed on three tracks by Sherry Joyce.
Rick Fowler	Back on My Good Foot	2008	Drums	The two previously collaborated on the Tourette Syndrome Charity album.
Love Tractor	n/a	1980	Drums	Bill joined the Tractor for five months and played with them at the same time as R.E.M. He ultimately chose the latter because they were willing to quit school to play music.
Love Tractor	Love Tractor	1982	Writing	When the Tractor's self-titled debut album was released, it included the Berry composition "Motorcade". The album was re-released two years later as 'Til the Cows Come Home.
Love Tractor	The Sky at Night	2001	Percussion	Bill rejoined the line-up as a percussionist during their 2001 reunion album, playing on Bright.
Michelle Malone	New Experience	1988	Drums	Plays on "Into the Night","Circus, Circus","Long Love Century", "Incident 8" & "All I Can Give You".
Rana	n/a	July 2001	Production	Berry produced demos of this New Jersey band, including the songs "Day She Went Away", "[Love It] Automatic", "Not So Mopso", "Ring in the Sand" and "So Long Edgewood".
Widespread Panic	n/a	March 1, 2000 – Athens, United States	Drums	Bill sat in with this band for a benefit playing "Ride Me High", Drums", "Time Is Free" and "Climb to Safety". Mike Mills joined the band the following night.
WUOGerz	n/a	1979	Drums	A band made up of fellow University of Georgia students who were mainly from the campus radio station WUOG.

=== With Peter Buck and Mike Mills ===
Artist	Release	Year	Role	Notes
Hindu Love Gods	n/a	February 14, 1984 – Athens, United States	Drums, guitar, bass	This ad hoc band, with local pianist and singer Bryan Cook of Time Toy, formed during a break from R.E.M. Their first gig was at the 40 Watt Club. Set: "Bangkok", "With a Girl Like You", "I'm Through with You", "Walk, Don't Run", "Personality Crisis", "Narrator", "Pipeline", "Needles and Pins", "California Sun", "Government Center", "Hippy Hippy Shake", "(I'm Not Your) Steppin' Stone", "Permanent Vacation", "Jump" and "Color Me Impressed".
Hindu Love Gods	n/a	February 29, 1984 – Athens, United States	Drums, guitar, bass	Another performance at the 40 Watt, with opening act Wheel O'Cheese (a pseudonym for Love Tractor.) This time the line-up was augmented by Michael Stipe and singer Warren Zevon. Michael played drums on "Rebel Rebel" and sang from "Little America" on. Bryan Cook only sang on "Gonna Have a Good Time Tonight". Set: "Up on the Cross", "Boom Boom Mancini", "Trouble Waiting to Happen", "Werewolves of London", "Gonna Have a Good Time Tonight", "Little America", "Second Guessing", "Gloria", "Rebel Rebel" and "Wild Thing".
Hindu Love Gods	n/a	June 1, 1984 – Athens, United States	Drums, guitar, bass	Performance at the Bourbon Street Club. Set: "Color Me Impressed", "White Light/White Heat", "There She Goes Again", "Government Center", "Broken Whisky Glass", "Little Willie", "Authority Song", "Personality Crisis", "Hang On Sloopy" and "Gonna Have a Good Time Tonight".
Hindu Love Gods	"Gonna Have a Good Time Tonight"/"Narrator"	1986	Drums, guitar, bass	The Hindus went to John Keane Studio in 1984 to record this single. The a-side is an Easybeats cover, the b-side is a Bill Berry original that pre-dates R.E.M. IRS released the material two years later with a cover painted by Bill.
Hindu Love Gods	n/a	January 20, 1986 – Athens, United States	Drums, guitar, bass	The band reformed for a benefit concert at the 40 Watt for recently deceased Minutemen guitarist D. Boon. R.E.M. performed a set and were joined in their first encore by Cook. Stipe sat out "Gonna Have a Good Time Tonight". Set: "Strange", "Gonna Have a Good Time Tonight" and "Pills".
Hindu Love Gods	Hindu Love Gods	1990	Drums, guitar, bass	While recording the sessions for Warren Zevon's album Sentimental Hygiene, the guys also cut several blues covers and a Prince cover. The material was released as an album by Warren's label, Giant, in 1990. Tracks: "Walking Blues", "Traveling Riverside Blues", "Raspberry Beret", "Crosscut Saw", "Junko Partner", "Mannish Boy", "Wang Dang Doodle", "Battleship Chains", "I'm a One Woman Man" and "Vigilante Man".
Hindu Love Gods	"Raspberry Beret"/"Wang Dang Doodle"/"Mannish Boy"	1990	Drums, guitar, bass	Single from the self-titled album. Some versions do not have the last track.
Indigo Girls	Indigo Girls	1990	Drums, guitar, bass	On the track "Tried to Be True". Michael sings on "Kid Fears".
Southern Gentlemen	n/a	May 11, 1988 – Athens, United States	Drums, guitar, bass	The instrumentalists from R.E.M. joined Roger McGuinn of The Byrds in the middle of his set at the Uptown Lounge. Set: "You Ain't Goin' Nowhere", "Mr. Spaceman", "The Bells of Rhymney", "Mr. Tambourine Man", "Turn! Turn! Turn!", "Eight Miles High", "Knockin' on Heaven's Door" and "I'll Feel a Whole Lot Better". McGuinn had guested at several R.E.M. shows as well.
The Spongetones	Torn Apart	1984	Clapping	On the track "Shock Therapy", with Don Dixon and Mitch Easter.
Nikki Sudden	The Jewel Thief	1991	Drums, guitar, bass	On the tracks "I Belong to You", "Alley of the Street" and "Jigsaw Blues".
Nikki Sudden	"I Belong to You"/"Alley of the Street"/"Jigsaw Blues"	1991	Drums, guitar, bass	Single from the album.
The Troggs	"Don't You Know"/"Nowhere Road"	February 2, 1992	Drums, guitar, bass, co-writing	Single from Athens, Andover.
The Troggs	Athens Andover	March 23, 1992	Drums, guitar, bass, co-writing	Berry, Buck and Mills, along with Peter Holsapple, act as a backing band to Reg Presley on this album and co-wrote the track Nowhere Road. Recorded at John Keane Studio in August and September 1991. Tracks: "Crazy Annie", "Together", "Tuned into Love", "Déjà Vu", "Nowhere Road", "Dust Bowl", "I'm in Control", "Don't You Know", "What's Your Game", "Suspicious" and "Hot Stuff". R.E.M. briefly considered recording an EP named The Godlike Genius of the Troggs as Presented by R.E.M..
The Troggs	"Together"/"Crazy Annie"/"Turned into Love"	1992	Drums, guitar, bass	Single from the album.
The Troggs	Athens and Beyond	1999	Drums, guitar, bass	Re-release of Athens, Andover with bonus tracks.
Warren Zevon	Sentimental Hygiene	1987	Drums, guitar, bass, co-writing	This was touted as a comeback album for Zevon and featured several guest stars in addition to R.E.M., such as fellow Duluth native Bob Dylan, Flea from Red Hot Chili Peppers, and Neil Young. The entire band performs on the song "Bad Karma", with Michael singing backup and playing shears as a musical instrument. All three members perform on Boom Boom Mancini", "Detox Mansion", "Bad Karma" and "Even a Dog Can Shake Hands", the latter of which they co-wrote with Zevon. Peter and Bill play on "Sentimental Hygiene" and "The Heartache".
Warren Zevon	"Sentimental Hygiene"/"The Factory"/"Leave My Monkey Alone"	August 1987	Drums, guitar, bass	Single from the album. Some versions do not have the last track.
Warren Zevon	"Bad Karma"/"Boom Boom Mancini"/"Leave My Monkey Alone"	November 1987	Drums, guitar, bass	Single from the album. Some versions do not have the last track.
Warren Zevon	"Reconsider Me"/"The Factory"/"Bad Karma"	February 1988	Drums, guitar, bass	Single from the album. Some versions do not have the last track.
Warren Zevon	"Splendid Isolation"/"Even a Dog Can Shake Hands"/"Bad Karma"/"Gridlock"	1989	Drums, guitar, bass, co-writing	Single from the album. Some versions do not have the last two tracks.
Warren Zevon	"Even a Dog Can Shake Hands"	1999	Drums, guitar, bass, co-writing	Used as the theme song to the television series Action.
James Mercer	n/a	January 6, 2018 – Portland, Oregon	Percussion	Performance at the Wonder Ballroom on the second night of the Help the Hoople benefit for Scott McCaughey. Berry, Buck and Mills joined Jenny Conlee of The Decemberists backing James Mercer for his performance of "You Are the Everything".
Filthier Friends	n/a	January 6, 2018 – Portland, Oregon	Drums	Performance at the Wonder Ballroom on the second night of the Help the Hoople benefit for Scott McCaughey. Mike Mills took lead vocal duties with Corin Tucker and Chloe Johnson on backing vocals and Kurt Bloch on guitar. Set: "The One I Love", "Texarkana", "(Don't Go Back To) Rockville", "I Believe" (with Colin Meloy of The Decemberists on lead vocals), and "Superman".

=== With Peter Buck ===
Artist	Release	Year	Role	Notes
Doubting Thomas	Blue Angel	1993	Drums, guitar	On one track.
Tony Trischka	World Turning	1993	Bouzouki, percussion	On "Alfa Ya Ya" and "If Animals Could Talk."

=== Reunions with R.E.M. ===
Performances of the three-piece R.E.M. reunited with their original drummer.

Release	Date	Notes
n/a	October 10, 2003 – Raleigh, United States	After walking across the stage to shake Joey Waronker's hand on August 29, 1999, at the Chastain Park Amphitheatre in Atlanta, Bill walked onstage at the Alltel Pavilion at Walnut Creek in Raleigh, North Carolina to sing on "Radio Free Europe" and drum on "Permanent Vacation".
n/a	August 10, 2005 – Athens, United States	The band reformed to play a friend and guitar tech Dewitt Burton's wedding reception at Kingpins Bowl and Brew in Athens, Georgia. The set: "Sitting Still", "(Don't Go Back To) Rockville", "Wolves, Lower", "Begin the Begin", "The One I Love", "Permanent Vacation" and "Radio Free Europe", with a short instrumental interlude between the last two numbers.
n/a	April 1, 2006 – Athens, United States	At a Minus 5 show in the Georgia Theatre, Bill, Mike and Michael joined Peter, Scott McCaughey and Bill Rieflin for an impromptu performance of "Country Feedback". Bill played bass, with Mike on keyboards.
2006 Christmas single	September 12, 2006 – Athens, United States	The band reforms to play at the "Finest Worksongs: Athens Bands Play the Music of R.E.M." tribute at the 40 Watt, playing "Begin the Begin" and "So. Central Rain (I'm Sorry)". Proceeds went to the Community Connection and Family Connection/Communities in Schools charities.
n/a	September 9, 2006 – Atlanta, Georgia	The band was inducted into the Georgia Music Hall of Fame at the Georgia World Congress Center. They performed "Begin the Begin", "Losing My Religion" and "Man on the Moon". Bill, Peter, Mike and Scott McCaughey also accompanied Gregg Allman on a performance of "Midnight Rider" to round out the show.
n/a	March 12, 2007 – New York City, United States	For the Rock and Roll Hall of Fame Induction Ceremony at the Waldorf Astoria Hotel, the band played "Begin the Begin", "Gardening at Night", "Man on the Moon" (with Eddie Vedder of Pearl Jam), and "I Wanna Be Your Dog" (with Patti Smith and Lenny Kaye).
#9 Dream	March 17, 2007	While preparing for their performance at the Rock 'n' Roll Hall of Fame induction ceremony, the original four members of R.E.M. recorded this John Lennon song in John Keane Studio, with production by Jacknife Lee. The song was released as a single on March 17, 2007 and was the first track to be released from the benefit compilation Instant Karma: The Amnesty International Campaign to Save Darfur, released on June 12, 2007.
n/a	Jun 13, 2024 – New York City, United States	At the Songwriters Hall of Fame induction ceremony at the Marriott Marquis Hotel in New York City, Berry, Buck, Mills and Stipe played an acoustic version of "Losing My Religion".

== See also ==
- Albums produced by Bill Berry
- Songs written by Bill Berry
