= List of James Beard America's Classics =

Since 1998, the James Beard Foundation has awarded the title of America's Classics to multiple restaurants. The award focuses on family-owned restaurants across the country that have been operating for at least a decade. According to the Washington Post the awards are given to restaurants “with timeless appeal, each beloved in its region for quality food that reflects the character of its community.”

The James Beard Foundation Awards have been likened to the Oscars of the food world due to its prestige and recognition. NPR described this award category "sneakily subversive". In the early years of the award, the focus was primarily on restaurants that served cuisines familiar to most Americans. However, in the late 2010s, the award began to include restaurants representing cuisines that were not traditionally considered part of the typical American diet. No restaurants were awarded in 2021 due to the COVID-19 pandemic.

There were certain limitations for awardees, such as having menu items below a certain price cap. However, these restrictions were eventually relaxed. The award was initially known as the Regional Classics before being renamed as America's Classics.

== Recipients ==
American Classics
Restaurant	State or territory	City	Year opened	Year awarded
Tadich Grill	California	San Francisco	1849	1998
Joe's Stone Crab	Florida	Miami Beach	1913	1998
Emmett Watson's Oyster Bar	Washington	Seattle	1979	1998
Stroud's	Missouri	Kansas City	1933	1998
2nd Avenue Deli	New York	New York City (Manhattan)	1954	1998
Joe T. Garcia's	Texas	Fort Worth	1935	1998
Cafe Pasqual's	New Mexico	Santa Fe	1979	1999
Frank Pepe Pizzeria Napoletana	Connecticut	New Haven	1925	1999
Mosca's	Louisiana	Avondale	1946	1999
Philippe's	California	Los Angeles	1908	1999
Grand Central Oyster Bar & Restaurant	New York	New York City (Manhattan)	1913	1999
The Berghoff	Illinois	Chicago	1898	1999
The Original Pancake House	Oregon	Portland	1953	1999
Helena's Hawaiian Foods	Hawaii	Honolulu	1946	2000
Swan Oyster Depot	California	San Francisco	1912	2000
White House Sub Shop	New Jersey	Atlantic City	1946	2000
Sonny Bryan's Smokehouse	Texas	Dallas	1958	2000
Camp Washington Chili	Ohio	Cincinnati	1940	2000
Moosewood Restaurant	New York	Ithaca	1973	2000
Mario's	New York	New York City (The Bronx)	1919	2000
Mrs. Wilkes' Dining Room	Georgia	Savannah	1943	2000
Langer's Deli	California	Los Angeles	1947	2001
Versailles	Florida	Miami	1971	2001
Ray's Boathouse	Washington	Seattle	1945	2002
Three Brothers Serbian Restaurant	Wisconsin	Milwaukee	1956	2002
Peter Luger Steak House	New York	New York City (Brooklyn)	1887	2002
Anchor Bar	New York	Buffalo	1935	2003
Duarte's Tavern	California	Pescadero	1894	2003
Lexington Barbecue	North Carolina	Lexington	1962	2003
The Shed	New Mexico	Santa Fe	1953	2003
Skylight Inn BBQ	North Carolina	Ayden	1947	2003
Ben's Chili Bowl	District of Columbia	Washington	1958	2004
Al's Breakfast	Minnesota	Minneapolis	1950	2004
Charlie's Sandwich Shoppe	Massachusetts	Boston	1927	2005
El Chorro Lodge	Arizona	Paradise Valley	1937	2005
Yuca's	California	Los Angeles	1976	2005
Willie Mae's Scotch House	Louisiana	New Orleans	1957	2005
John's Roast Pork	Pennsylvania	Philadelphia	1930	2006
Lagomarcino's	Illinois	Moline	1908	2006
Bowen's Island Restaurant	South Carolina	Charleston	1946	2006
Polly's Pancake Parlor	New Hampshire	Sugar Hill	1938	2006
Gott's Roadside	California	St. Helena	1949	2006
Barney Greengrass	New York	New York City (Manhattan)	1908	2006
Louie Mueller Barbecue	Texas	Taylor	1949	2006
Hamura's Saimin Stand	Hawaii	Lihue	1952	2006
Pickwick Restaurant and Pub	Minnesota	Duluth	1888	2007
Primanti Bros.	Pennsylvania	Pittsburgh	1933	2007
Aunt Carrie's	Rhode Island	Narragansett	1920	2007
Doe's Eat Place	Mississippi	Greenville	1941	2007
Bagaduce Lunch	Maine	Brooksville	1946	2008
Tufano's Vernon Park Tap	Illinois	Chicago	1930	2008
Irma's Restaurant	Texas	Houston	1989	2008
Maneki	Washington	Seattle	1904	2008
Totonno's	New York	New York City (Brooklyn)	1924	2009
Breitbach's Country Dining	Iowa	Sherrill	1853	2009
Mustache Bill's Diner	New Jersey	Barnegat Light	1959	2009
Yank Sing	California	San Francisco	1958	2009
Arnold's Country Kitchen	Tennessee	Nashville	1983	2009
Al's French Frys	Vermont	South Burlington	1940s	2010
The Bright Star	Alabama	Bessemer	1907	2010
Mary & Tito's Cafe	New Mexico	Albuquerque	1963	2010
Calumet Fisheries	Illinois	Chicago	1948	2010
Chef Vola's	New Jersey	Atlantic City	1921	2011
Le Veau d'Or	New York	New York City (Manhattan)	1937	2011
Shady Glen	Connecticut	Manchester	1948	2012
St. Elmo's Steak House	Indiana	Indianapolis	1902	2012
Jones Bar-B-Q Diner	Arkansas	Marianna	1910s	2012
The Fry Bread House	Arizona	Phoenix	1992	2012
Nora's Fish Creek Inn	Wyoming	Wilson	1970s	2012
Frank Fat's	California	Sacramento	1939	2013
Prince's Hot Chicken Shack	Tennessee	Nashville	1930s	2013
Kramarczuk's	Minnesota	Minneapolis	1954	2013
Keens Steakhouse	New York	New York City (Manhattan)	1885	2013
Olneyville New York System	Rhode Island	Providence	1946	2014
Hansen's Sno Bliz	Louisiana	New Orleans	1939	2014
Perini Ranch Steakhouse	Texas	Buffalo Gap	1983	2014
Guelaguetza	California	Los Angeles	1994	2015
Beaumont Inn	Kentucky	Harrodsburg	1919	2015
Sally Bell's Kitchen	Virginia	Richmond	1924	2015
Sevilla	New York	New York City (Manhattan)	1923	2015
Archie's Waeside	Iowa	Le Mars	1949	2015
Al Ameer Restaurant	Michigan	Dearborn	1989	2016
Brooks' House of Bar-B-Q	New York	Oneonta	1912	2016
Bully's Restaurant	Mississippi	Jackson	1982	2016
Rancho de Chimayo Restaurante	New Mexico	Chimayo	1965	2016
Bertha's Kitchen	South Carolina	Charleston	1980	2017
Gioia's Deli	Missouri	Saint Louis	1918	2017
La Taqueria	California	San Francisco	1960s	2017
Sahadi's	New York	New York City (Brooklyn)	1890s	2017
Schultz's Crab House	Maryland	Essex	1950	2017
Galleria Umberto	Massachusetts	Boston	1974	2018
Los Hernandez	Washington	Union Gap	1990	2018
El Guero Canelo	Arizona	Tucson	1993	2018
Sun Wah	Illinois	Chicago	1986	2018
Dong Phuong Bakery	Louisiana	New Orleans	1982	2018
A&A Bake & Doubles Shop	New York	New York City (Brooklyn)	2002	2019
Pho 79	California	Garden Grove	1982	2019
Annie's Paramount Steakhouse	District of Columbia	Washington	1948	2019
Jim's Steak and Spaghetti House	West Virginia	Huntington	1945	2019
Sehnert's Bakery & Bieroc Cafe	Nebraska	McCook	1957	2019
Puritan Backroom	New Hampshire	Manchester	1974	2020
El Taco de Mexico	Colorado	Denver	1985	2020
Zehnder's of Frankenmuth	Michigan	Frankenmuth	1928	2020
Vera's Backyard Bar-B-Que	Texas	Brownsville	1955	2020
Lassis Inn	Arkansas	Little Rock	1905	2020
Oriental Mart	Washington	Seattle	1971	2020
Casa Vega	California	Sherman Oaks	1956	2022
Corinne's Place	New Jersey	Camden	1989	2022
Solly's Grille	Wisconsin	Milwaukee	1936	2022
Wo Hop	New York	New York City (Manhattan)	1938	2022
The Busy Bee Café	Georgia	Atlanta	1947	2022
Florence's Restaurant	Oklahoma	Oklahoma City	1952	2022
Manago Hotel	Hawaii	Captain Cook	1917	2023
Joe's Bakery and Coffee Shop	Texas	Austin	1962	2023
Nezinscot Farm	Maine	Turner	1987	2023
La Casita Blanca	Puerto Rico	San Juan	1980	2023
Wagner's Village Inn	Indiana	Oldenburg	1968	2023
Mandalay	California	San Francisco	1984	2024
Vietnam Restaurant	Pennsylvania	Philadelphia	1984	2024
Pheasant Restaurant and Lounge	South Dakota	Brookings	1949	2024
Sylvia's Restaurant	New York	New York City (Manhattan)	1962	2024
Wade's Restaurant	South Carolina	Spartanburg	1947	2024
Peppermill Restaurant and Fireside Lounge	Nevada	Las Vegas	1972	2024
Lem's Bar-B-Q	Illinois	Chicago	1954	2025
The Pioneer Saloon	Idaho	Ketchum	1940	2025
Sullivan's Castle Island	Massachusetts	Boston	1951	2025
Lucky Wishbone	Alaska	Anchorage	1955	2025
Dooky Chase	Louisiana	New Orleans	1939	2025
Gaido's	Texas	Galveston	1911	2025
The Serving Spoon	California	Inglewood	1983	2026
Oyster House	Pennsylvania	Philadelphia	1947	2026
Johnny's Cafe	Nebraska	Omaha	1923	2026
Eng's	New York	Kingston	1927	2026
Figaretti's Italian Restaurant	West Virginia	Wheeling	1948	2026
Bob Taylor's Ranch House	Las Vegas	Nevada	1955	2026

Defunct recipients
Restaurant	State or territory	City	Year opened	Year awarded	Year closed
Durgin Park	Massachusetts	Boston	1874	1998	2019
Doris & Ed's Seafood Restaurant	New Jersey	Highlands	1978	1998	2011
H&H Car Wash and Coffee Shop	Texas	El Paso	1958	2001	2021
Waterman's Beach Lobster	Maine	South Thomaston	1986	2001	2016
Maison Marconi	Maryland	Baltimore	1920	2002	2005
Prime Burger	New York	New York City (Manhattan)	1965	2004	2012
Sam Choy's Kaloko	Hawaii	Kailua Kona	1991	2004	2004
Weaver D's Delicious Fine Foods	Georgia	Athens	1986	2007	2026
Brookville Hotel	Kansas	Abilene	1870	2007	2020
Jumbo's	Florida	Miami	1955	2008	2014
Gustavus Inn	Alaska	Gustavus	1965	2010	2021
Crook's Corner	North Carolina	Chapel Hill	1982	2011	2021
Watts Tea Shop	Wisconsin	Milwaukee	1930s	2011	2016
Noriega Restaurant and Hotel	California	Bakersfield	1893	2011	2020
C. F. Folks	District of Columbia	Washington	1981	2013	2018
Sokolowski's University Inn	Ohio	Cleveland	1923	2014	2020
Nick's Italian Cafe	Oregon	McMinnville	1977	2014	2023
Matt's Place	Montana	Butte	1930	2016	2021
Pekin Noodle Parlor	Montana	Butte	1911	2023	2026
