= Guelaguetza (restaurant) =

Mexican restaurant in Los Angeles, California, U.S.

- Interactive map of Guelaguetza

Restaurant information
- Established: 1994
- Food type: Mexican
- Location: 3014 West Olympic Boulevard, Los Angeles, California, 90006, United States
- Coordinates: 34°03′09″N 118°18′03″W
- Website: ilovemole.com

Guelaguetza is a Mexican restaurant in Los Angeles, California. Established by Fernando Lopez in 1994

Guelaguetza is one of the few places in Los Angeles (or even the United States) in which patrons can intentionally ingest insects, namely chapulines (fried grasshoppers), an Oaxacan delicacy.

== History ==
Fernando Lopez emigrate from his native Oaxaca to Los Angeles in 1993 and opened his original restaurant on Eighth Street the following year. After outgrowing its original location, Guelaguetza was moved to its current location on Olympic Boulevard in 2000, in a space that previously housed the VIP Palace Korean Restaurant. In 2012, Fernando turned the business over to his four children after he decided to retire and return to Oaxaca.

== Reception ==
The reviewer from Condé Nast Traveler wrote, "This is a great meal to enjoy with family and friends, especially for a celebratory occasion where you don't want to spend your entire rent check." While writing for the LA Weekly, food critic Jonathan Gold called the restaurant "one of the best Oaxacan restaurants in the country." Time Out Magazine called "Guelaguetza a citywide institution, and the kind of place worth visiting over and over again."

The business has been recognized as one of "America's Classics" in 2015 by the James Beard Foundation. The restaurant is the winner of the 2021 Gold Award.

== See also ==
- List of James Beard America's Classics
- List of Mexican restaurants
