= Hamura's Saimin Stand =

Restaurant in Lihue, Hawaii, U.S.

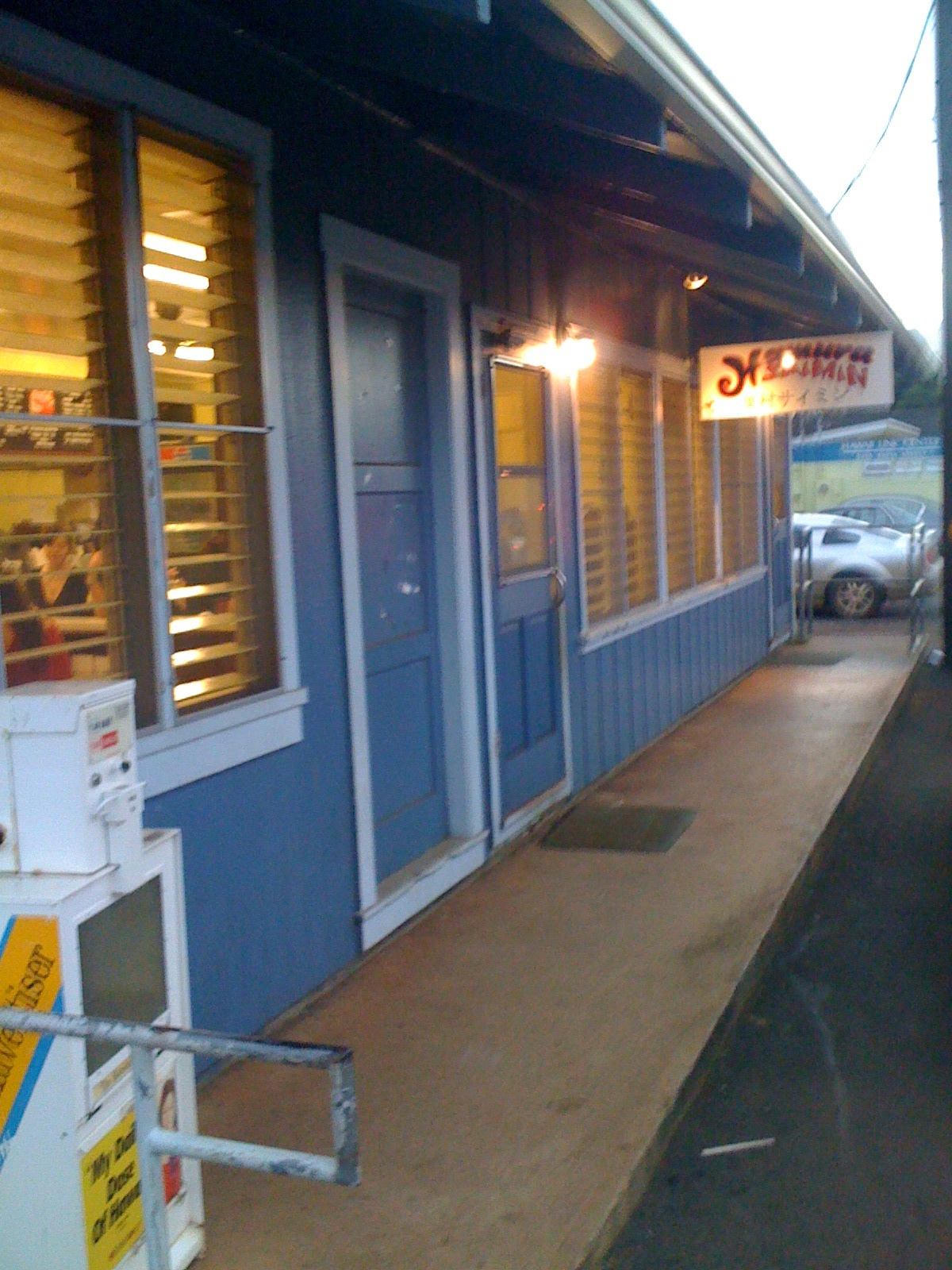
- Hamura's Saimin Stand in 2009
- Interactive map of Hamura's Saimin Stand

Restaurant information
- Established: 1952
- Location: 2956 Kress Street, Lihue, Hawaii, 96766, United States
- Coordinates: 21°58′18″N 159°21′57″W

Hamura's Saimin Stand is a restaurant in Lihue, Hawaii. Established in 1952 within a converted US Army barracks, the restaurant received an "America's Classic" award from the James Beard Foundation. The menu has included saimin and shaved ice.

Frommer's has rated the restaurant three out of three stars.

== See also ==
- List of James Beard America's Classics
