= La Casita Blanca =

Restaurant in San Juan, Puerto Rico

- Interactive map of La Casita Blanca

Restaurant information
- Food type: Caribbean; Puerto Rican
- Location: 351 Calle Tapia, San Juan, Puerto Rico
- Coordinates: 18°26′36″N 66°3′13″W

La Casita Blanca is a Caribbean / Puerto Rican restaurant in San Juan, Puerto Rico. It was named one of "America's Classics" by the James Beard Foundation in 2023.

The restaurant was founded in 1980 by Jesus Perez Ruiz in the Villa Palmeras neighborhood of Santurce. The James Beard Foundation describes it as a traditional Puerto Rican fonda serving local comfort food.
