= Prime Burger =

Restaurant in New York City, U.S.

- Interactive map of Prime Burger

Restaurant information
- Established: 1938
- Closed: 2012
- Location: 5 East 51st Street, New York City, New York, 10022, United States
- Coordinates: 40°45′32.2″N 73°58′33.2″W

Prime Burger was a restaurant in New York City. The business was named one of "America's Classics" by the James Beard Foundation Awards in 2004.
