= Gioia's Deli =

Gioia’s Deli

Restaurant information
- Established: 1918
- Owner: The Donley Family
- Location: 1934 Macklind Ave, St. Louis, Missouri, 63110
- Other locations: 623 N. New Ballas, Creve Coeur, MO 63141; 11855 Adie Rd., Maryland Heights, MO 63043
- Website: www.gioiasdeli.com

Gioia's Deli, located in The Hill, St. Louis, was named a James Beard America’s Classic in 2017, the first St. Louis restaurant to be named so. Opened in 1918, it was sold to the Donley family in 1980. A Downtown St. Louis location opened in 2016. They are famous for their hot salami sandwiches. Fazio's Bakery supplies the bread and the cured meats are from Volpi Salumeria. Co-owner Alex Donley made Hot Salami sandwiches on Bizarre Foods with Andrew Zimmern.

== History ==
The deli was originally a grocery operated by Charlie Gioia from Marcallo, Italy.
