= Wade's Restaurant =

Restaurant in Spartanburg, South Carolina, U.S.

- Interactive map of Wade's Restaurant

Restaurant information
- Established: 1947
- Location: 1000 North Pine Street, Spartanburg, South Carolina, 29303, United States
- Coordinates: 34°58′9″N 81°56′3″W

Wade's Restaurant is a restaurant in Spartanburg, South Carolina, United States. Established in 1947, the restaurant was named an "America's Classic" by the James Beard Foundation in 2024.

== See also ==
- List of James Beard America's Classics
