= Watts Tea Shop =

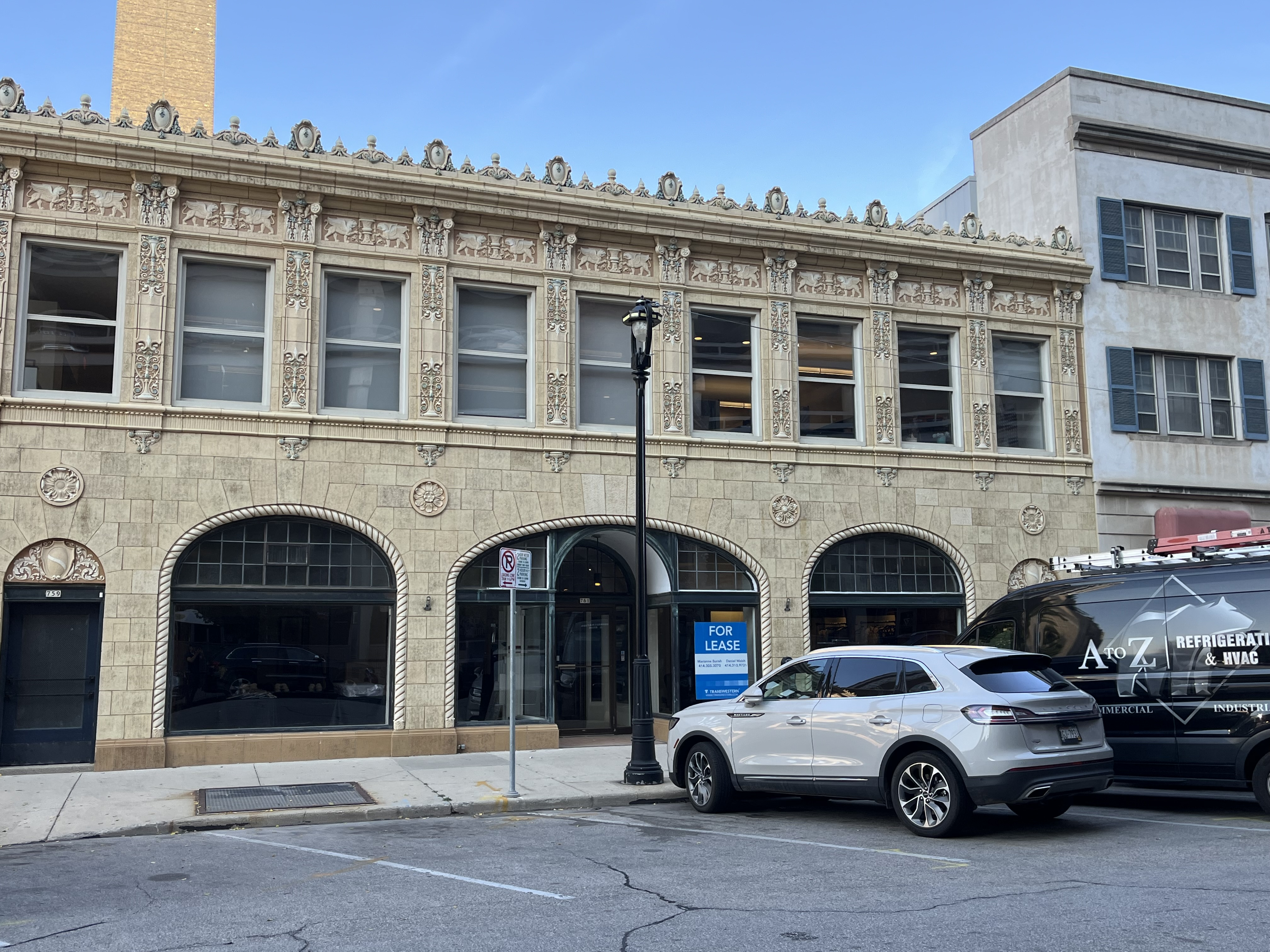
- Interactive map of Watts Tea Shop

Restaurant information
- Location: 761 North Jefferson Street, Milwaukee, Wisconsin, 53202, United States
- Coordinates: 43°02′25″N 87°54′20″W

Watts Tea Shop operated in Milwaukee, Wisconsin. It was considered one of "America's Classics" by the James Beard Foundation, before closing permanently.

== See also ==
- List of James Beard America's Classics
