= Sally Bell's Kitchen =

Restaurant in Richmond, Virginia, U.S.

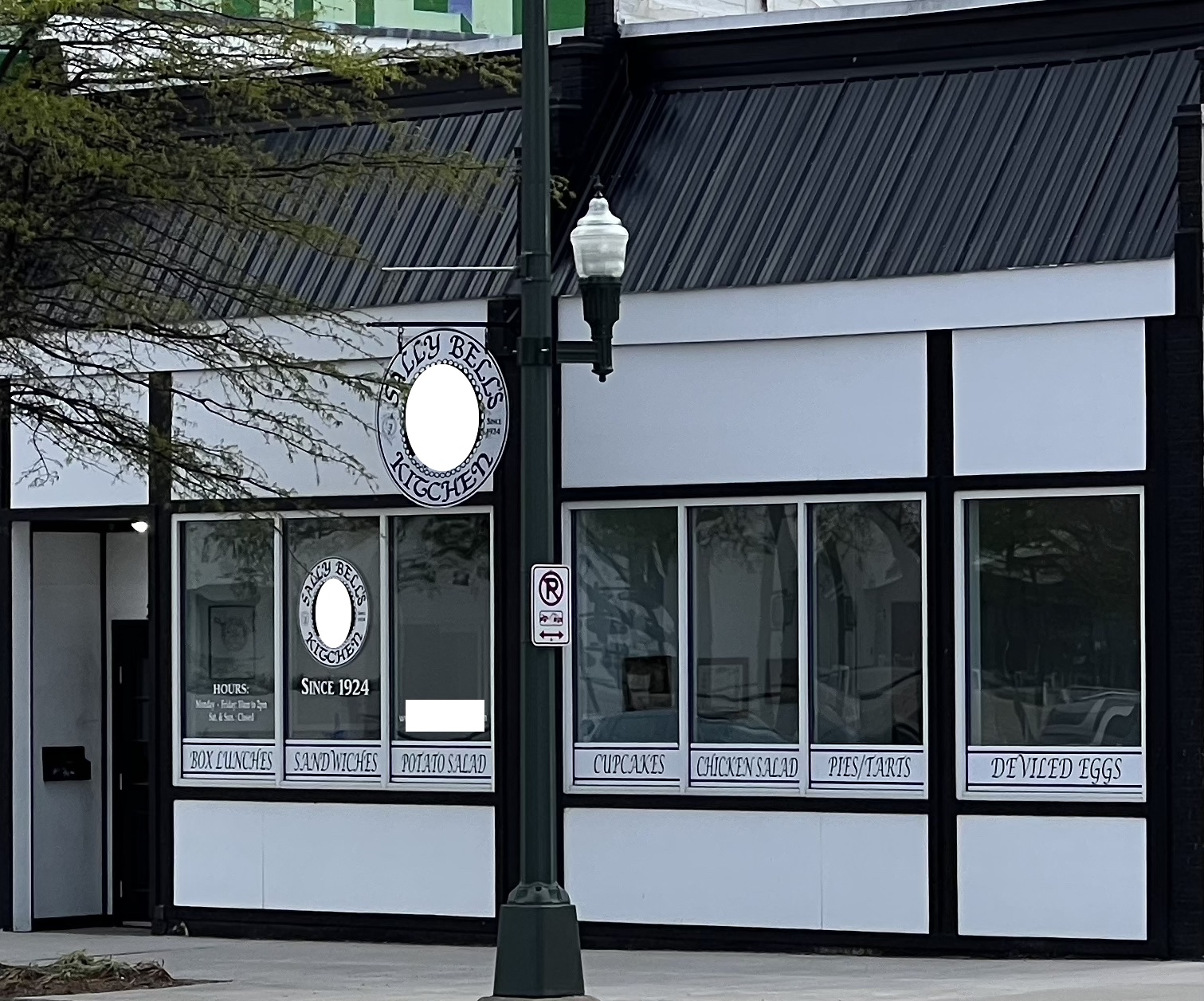
- Interactive map of Sally Bell's Kitchen

Restaurant information
- Location: 2337 West Broad Street, Richmond, Virginia, 23220, United States
- Coordinates: 37.559645°N 77.465773°W

Sally Bell's Kitchen is a restaurant in Richmond, Virginia. It has been recognized as one of "America's Classics" by the James Beard Foundation.

== See also ==
- List of James Beard America's Classics
