= Cafe Pasqual's =

Restaurant in Santa Fe, New Mexico, U.S.

- Interactive map of Cafe Pasqual's

Restaurant information
- Owner: Katharine Kagel
- Chef: Katharine Kagel
- Location: 121 Don Gaspar Ave, Santa Fe, New Mexico, 87501, United States
- Coordinates: 35.6865°N 105.93965°W

Cafe Pasqual's is an American Southwestern restaurant in Santa Fe, New Mexico. The business was named one of "America's Classics" by the James Beard Foundation Awards in 1999. The cafe is located one block south of the Santa Fe Plaza in an adobe building built in 1905, and founded by Katharine Kagel in 1979, it is the only restaurant in which she has ever worked. She was nominated for "Best Chef in the Southwest" by the James Beard Foundation Awards in 1999.

== History ==
Founded in 1979 by Katharine Kagel, the restaurant was founded sourcing local ingredients, pastured meats and sustainable fish. The food is influenced by Mexican and New Mexican culinary traditions. Colors, spices, and textures make each dish unique to the region.

== Building and location history ==
The restaurant is housed in a historic 650-square-foot adobe building located at 121 Don Gaspar Avenue, which was originally constructed in 1905. Before operating as Cafe Pasqual's, the brick-and-mortar location hosted a series of continuous commercial and culinary concepts. Following stints as a Texaco station and the Liberty Cafe (1923–1935), the site operated as the K.C. Waffle House from the mid-1930s until 1954. During this era, the kitchen was led for eleven years (1931–1942) by head chef George Marchi (Giordano Bruno), a former professional boxer whose American citizenship was sponsored by the establishment's proprietor, Gus Mitchell. Following Marchi's departure from the K.C. Waffle House in 1942, he went on to serve as a prominent chef in the region, including at the Manhattan Project's Fuller Lodge in Los Alamos. The location subsequently transitioned into the Mayflower Café in 1954, and later the Golden Temple of Conscious Cookery in the 1970s, before its current establishment in 1979.
