= Helena's Hawaiian Foods =

Restaurant in Honolulu, Hawaii, U.S.

Coordinates: 21.3309°N 157.8651°W

- Interactive map of Helena's Hawaiian Foods

Restaurant information
- Established: 1946
- Location: Honolulu, Hawaii, United States
- Website: helenashawaiianfood.com

Helena's Hawaiian Foods is a restaurant in Honolulu, Hawaii. The business was named one of "America's Classics" by the James Beard Foundation Awards in 2000.
