= Al Ameer Restaurant =

Notable award-winning restaurant serving arab food in Dearborn, MI

Coordinates: 42°20′40″N 83°10′3″W

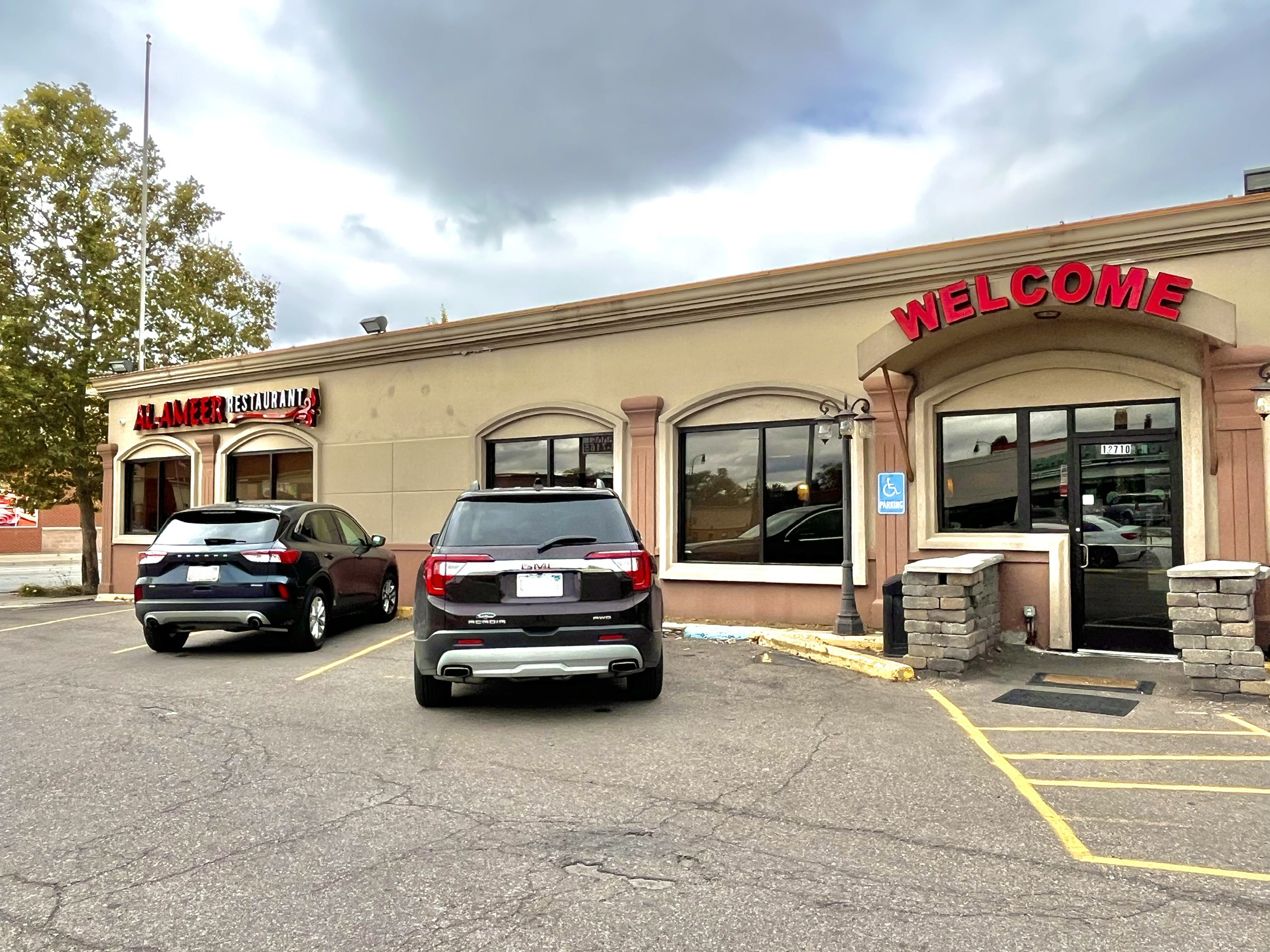
- Interactive map of Al Ameer Restaurant
- Location: Dearborn, Michigan

Construction
- Opened: 1989

Website
- alameerrestaurant.com

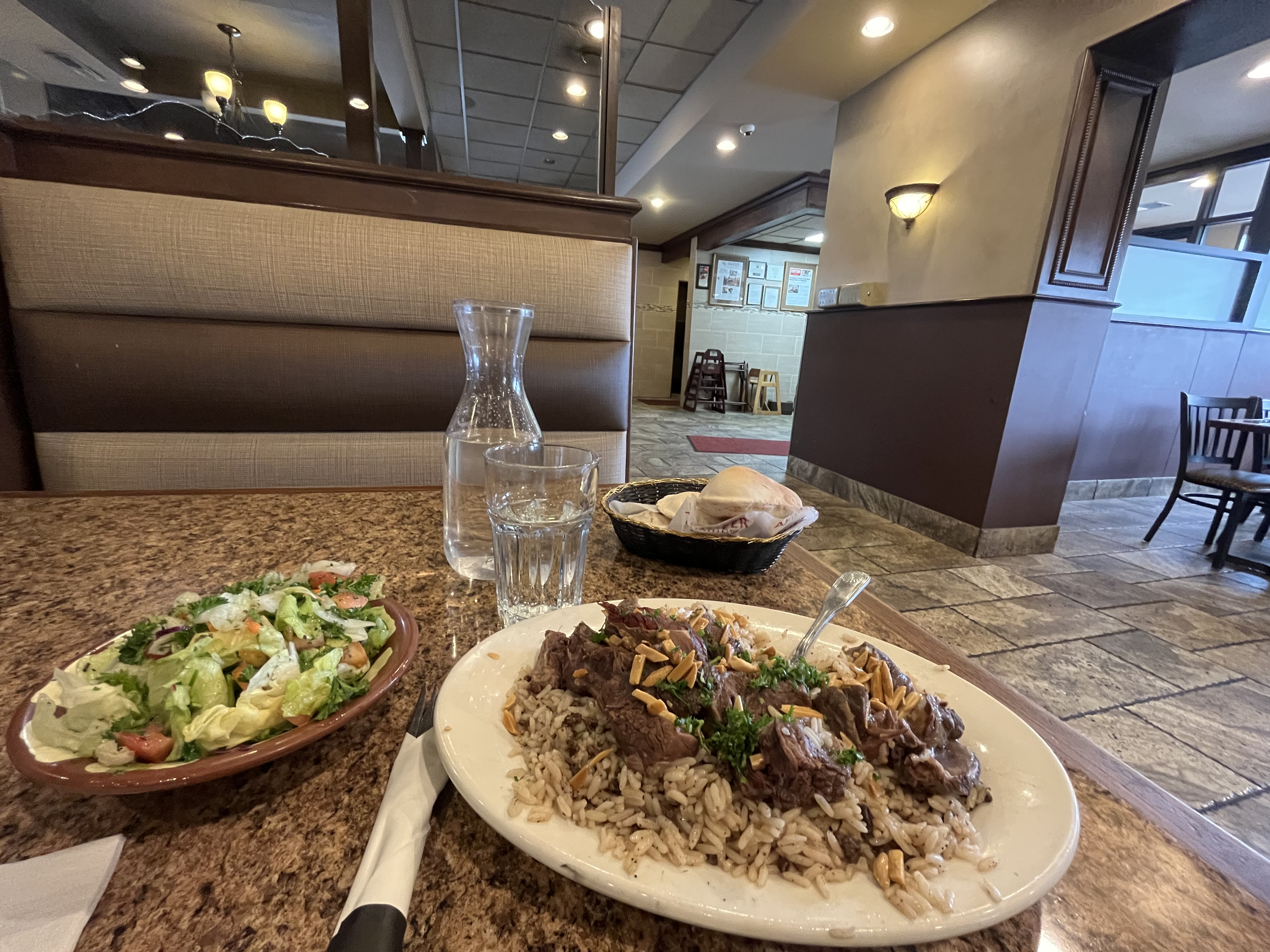
Interior view with stuffed lamb dish, October 2023

Al Ameer is a Lebanese restaurant with locations in Dearborn, Michigan and Dearborn Heights, Michigan. In 2016, Al Ameer won a James Beard Foundation Award, making it the first restaurant in the state of Michigan to earn the American Classic distinction. Al Ameer was founded by Khalil Ammar and Zaki Hashem, who continue to operate the restaurant with several members of their families.

In addition to serving middle eastern food to the public, Al Ameer is a cultural rallying point for members of the local Arab population. In 2022, Al Ameer hosted a lunch for United States Secretary of Homeland Security Alejandro Mayorkas and Dearborn mayor Abdullah Hammoud, where they discussed concerns about racial profiling of Arab Americans over the previous 20 years.
