= Al's French Frys =

Restaurant

- Interactive map of Al's French Frys

Restaurant information
- Established: 1940's
- Owners: Bill and Shane Bissonette
- Previous owners: Al and Genevieve Rusterholz
- Location: 1251 Williston Road, South Burlington, Vermont
- Coordinates: 44°28′03″N 73°10′28″W
- Website: http://www.alsfrenchfrys.com/

Al's French Frys is a restaurant in South Burlington, Vermont, United States. The restaurant was established in 1946 by Al and Genevieve Rusterholz. In 2010 the restaurant was named an "America's Classic" by the James Beard Foundation.

== See also ==
- List of James Beard America's Classics
