= Tufano's Vernon Park Tap =

Italian restaurant in Chicago, Illinois, U.S.

- Interactive map of Tufano's Vernon Park Tap

Restaurant information
- Owner: Joey DiBuono
- Food type: Italian
- Location: 1073 West Vernon Park Place, Chicago, Illinois, 60607, United States
- Coordinates: 41°52′22″N 87°39′15″W

Tufano's Vernon Park Tap is an Italian restaurant in Chicago, Illinois, United States. Joey DiBuono is the owner.

The restaurant has appeared on the Food Network series Diners, Drive-Ins and Dives.

== See also ==
- List of Diners, Drive-Ins and Dives episodes
- List of Italian restaurants
- List of James Beard America's Classics
