= Kramarczuk's =

Deli and restaurant in Minneapolis, Minnesota, U.S.

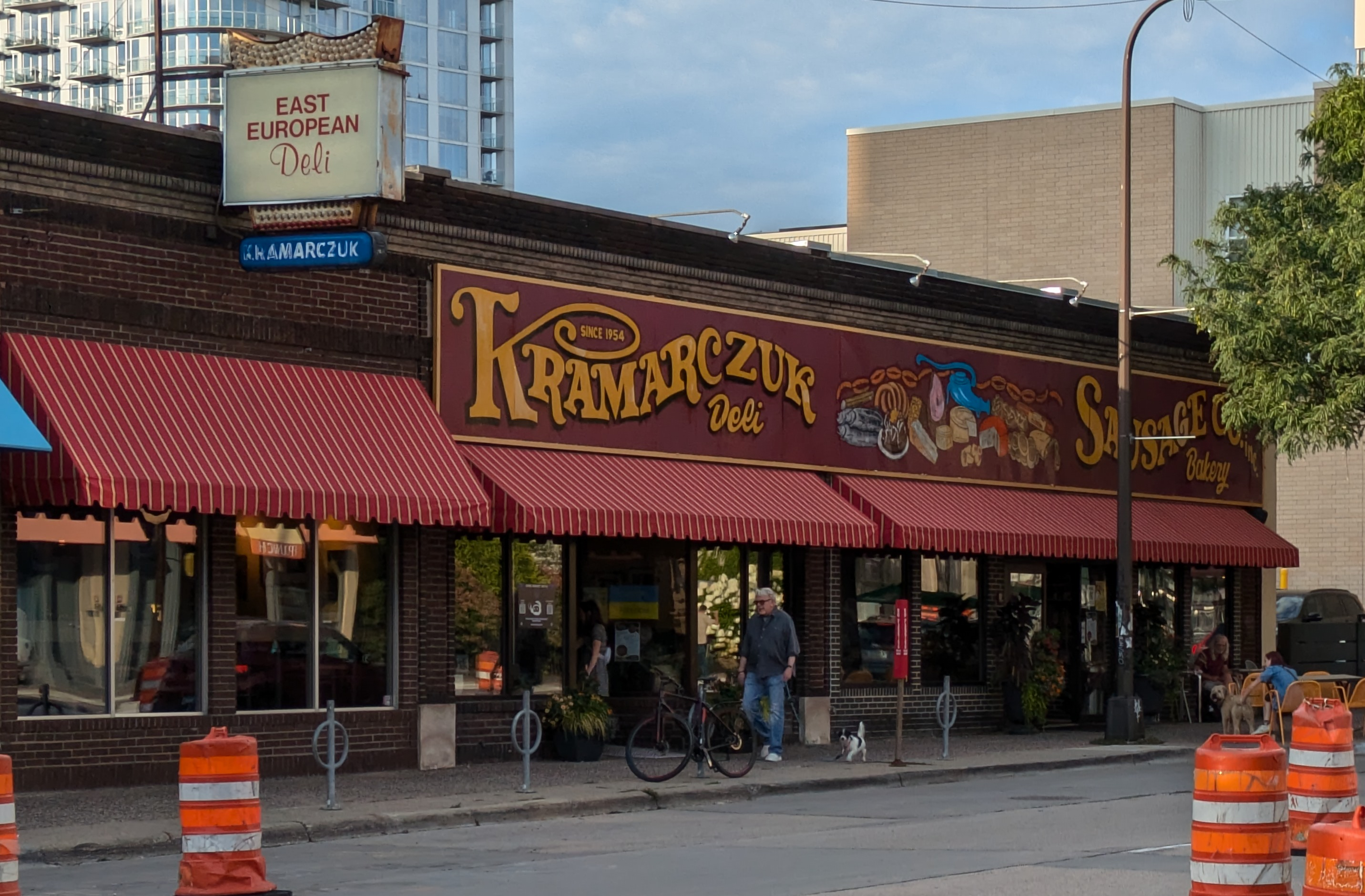
- Interactive map of Kramarczuk's

Restaurant information
- Food type: Eastern European
- Location: Minnesota, United States
- Coordinates: 44°59′16″N 93°15′26.5″W

Kramarczuk's is an Eastern European delicatessen and restaurant in Minneapolis, in the U.S. state of Minnesota. The business was established in 1954.

== Reception ==
In 2013, the business was named one of "America's Classics" by the James Beard Foundation Award.
