= Pickwick Restaurant and Pub =

Coordinates: 46.7917°N 92.09154°W

The Pickwick Restaurant and Pub in Duluth, Minnesota began in 1888 as the “Old Saloon," a tasting bar located within the Fitger Brewing Company. It survived a 1914 move and Prohibition, with many relics from 19th century intact.

In 2007, they won a James Beard Foundation Award as an America’s Classic.

== Ownership ==
It was originally owned by Brewmaster August Fitger along with Percy and Fritz Anneke. In 1914, the Fitger “Old Saloon” moved a short walk from its location at 600 East Superior to the present Pickwick locale of 508 East Superior Street.

When prohibition was enacted in 1920, one of the bartenders, Joseph Wisocki, borrowed $200 from his father-in-law and bought the business, but not the building. During prohibition, the restaurant sold a product called “Near Beer" and sandwiches.

In 1933, prohibition was repealed and as reported in the Lake Superior Port Cities Magazine, Wisocki threw the last glass of Near Bear into the fireplace and the Pickwick remained open 24 hours that day. They served between eight and nine thousand people. In July, 1945, the building was purchased from the Fitger Brewing Company for the sum of $11,000

== Architecture ==
The architect, Anthony Peck, designed the rooms of the Pickwick with European styled architecture to honor the area’s many immigrants.

Other notable features of the décor are the paintings. Canvases were moved from the Old Saloon in the Fitger building and had been painted in 1893 by. F. W. Luertzer. John Fery also worked on the paintings and later became the artist for the Great Northern Railway and Northern Pacific Railway. Hidden in these artworks are a five-fingered monk, a grasshopper commemorating the insect plague and beer-brewing gnomes.

== Management ==
The Pickwick was run by Joseph Stanley Wisocki until his death in the 1950s. Joseph Wisocki, Jr. headed the business until the mid-1970s when his sons, Anthony and Stephen took over equal ownership. They retired in 2001, selling the business to Stephen's son Chris Wisocki, who then sold the business in 2010. The Pickwick received the James Beard Foundation Award in 2007 in the American Classic category, a category for longevity of outstanding food and service for 45 or more years. The restaurant remains open today with owners Tim and Amy Wright.
