= El Taco de Mexico =

Restaurant in Denver, Colorado, United States

Coordinates: 39°43′39″N 104°59′54″W

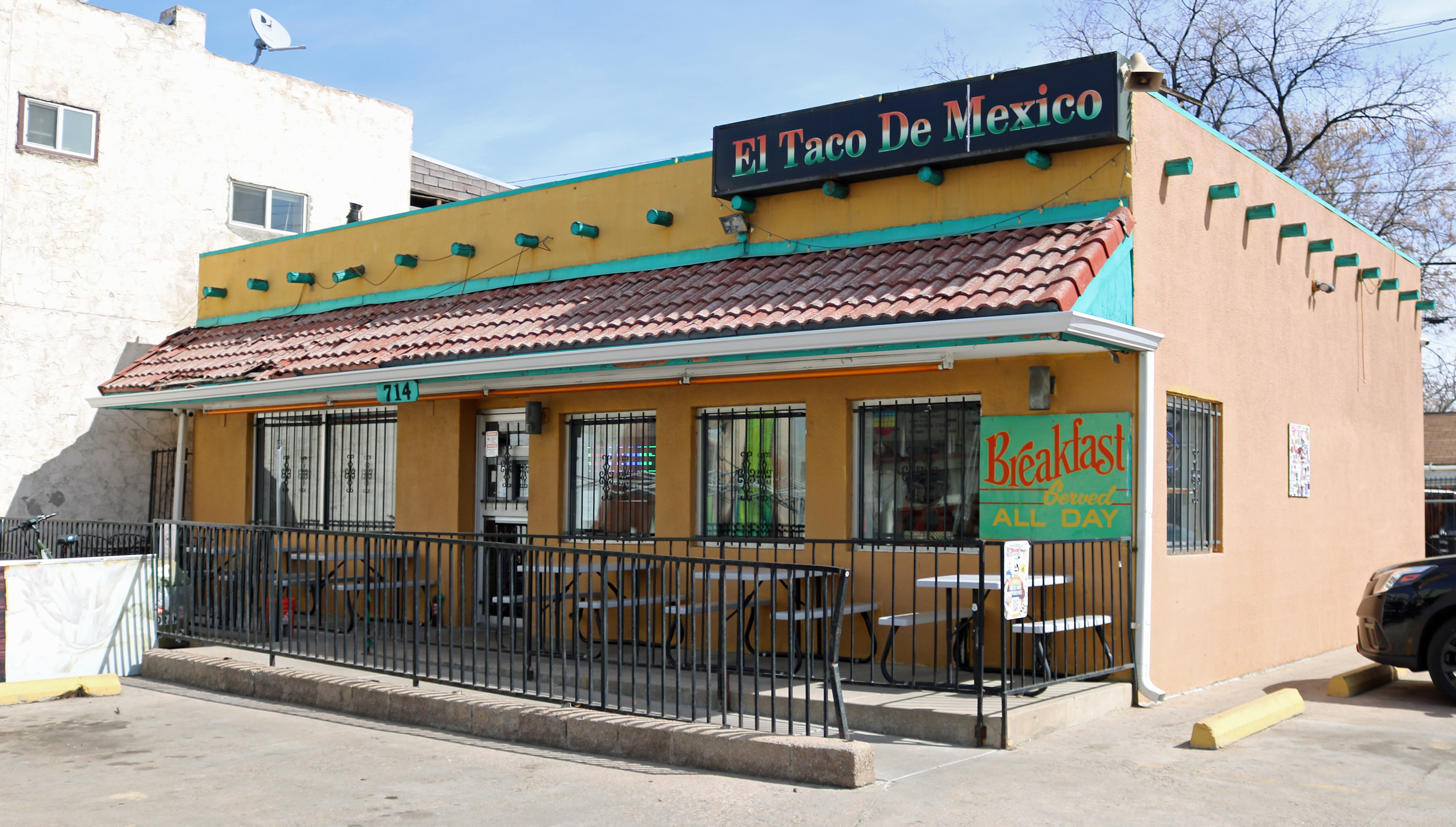
The restaurant in 2023

El Taco de Mexico is a restaurant in Denver, Colorado. In 2020 it was named one of America's Classics by the James Beard Foundation.

== History ==
The restaurant was founded by Maria Luisa Zanabria, who emigrated from Mexico City, then moved from California to Colorado in 1985; she first operated the business from a trailer parked on Denver's Santa Fe Drive in Denver's Art District on Santa Fe.

The 2020 America's Classics award was a first for a Colorado restaurant.

== Menu ==
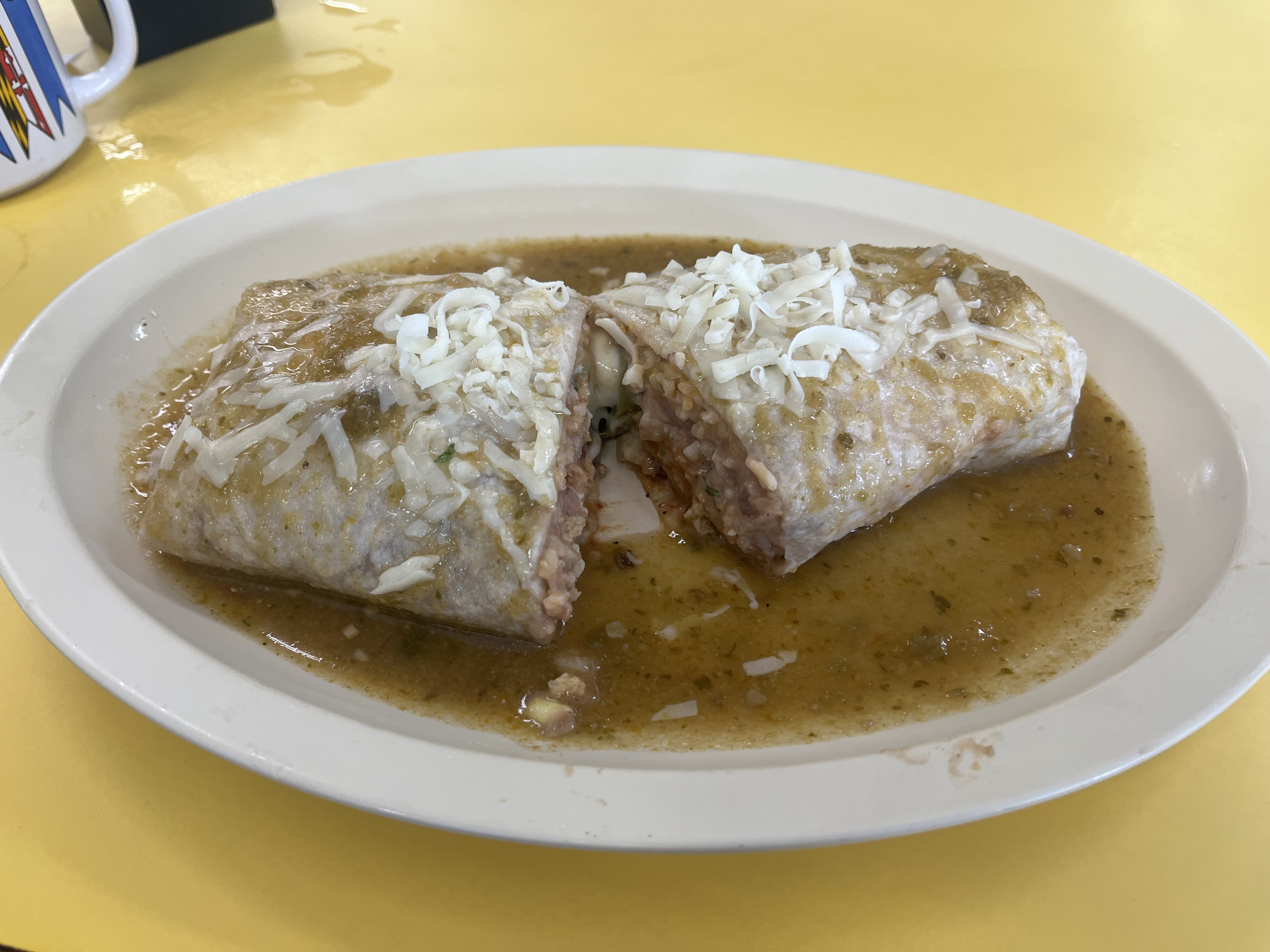
A "smothered" Chile Rellenos Burrito

The restaurant serves Mexican staples such as burritos, enchiladas, gorditas, tacos, tortas, tamales, and menudo. The Beard Foundation in their announcement called the pork burrito "the restaurant’s crowning glory...smothered in green chile humming with earthy spice".

== Recognition ==
In 2020 the restaurant was named one of America's Classics by the James Beard Foundation; in their announcement the foundation called it a "lodestar...among Denver's thriving Mexican food culture". Eater Denver called it "the mother of all Mexican food institutions in Denver". Andrew Zimmern called it "Denver's quintessential taqueria". Conde Nast Traveler, naming it one of Denver's 20 Best Restaurants, said the green chili "represents the gold standard of the Southwestern staple". Food & Wine, naming their burrito one of the best in the country, called their smothered chile relleno burrito "the breakfast dish of your dreams."
