= Nick's Italian Cafe =

Restaurant in McMinnville, Oregon, U.S.

- Interactive map of Nick's Italian Cafe

Restaurant information
- Established: 1977
- Previous owner: Nick Peirano
- Location: 521 NE 3rd Street, McMinnville, Oregon, 97128, United States
- Coordinates: 45°12′36″N 123°11′39″W

Nick's Italian Cafe was an Italian restaurant in McMinnville, Oregon, United States. Established by Nick Peirano in 1977, the business was named an America's Classics restaurant by the James Beard Foundation in 2014. The restaurant closed in 2023. In March 2024, media outlets reported that Scott Baldwin, Thomas Ghinazzi, and Jordan Neale purchased the restaurant and hoped in re-open in the Spring season.

== Reception ==
Martin Cizmar included Nick's in Willamette Week's 2017 overview of "The 10 Pacific Northwest Restaurants Outside Portland Any Local Foodie Has To try". Jamie Hale included the business in The Oregonian's 2017 list of "20 reasons to love McMinnville".

== See also ==
- List of defunct restaurants of the United States
- List of Italian restaurants
- List of James Beard America's Classics
