= Archie's Waeside =

Restaurant in Le Mars, Iowa, U.S.

- Interactive map of Archie's Waeside

Restaurant information
- Location: Le Mars, Iowa, United States
- Coordinates: 42.7968°N 96.1609°W

Archie's Waeside is a steakhouse in Le Mars, Iowa. It opened in 1949, and was named one of "America's Classics" by the James Beard Foundation in 2015.

== See also ==
- List of James Beard America's Classics
