= The Shed (restaurant) =

Restaurant in Santa Fe, New Mexico, U.S.

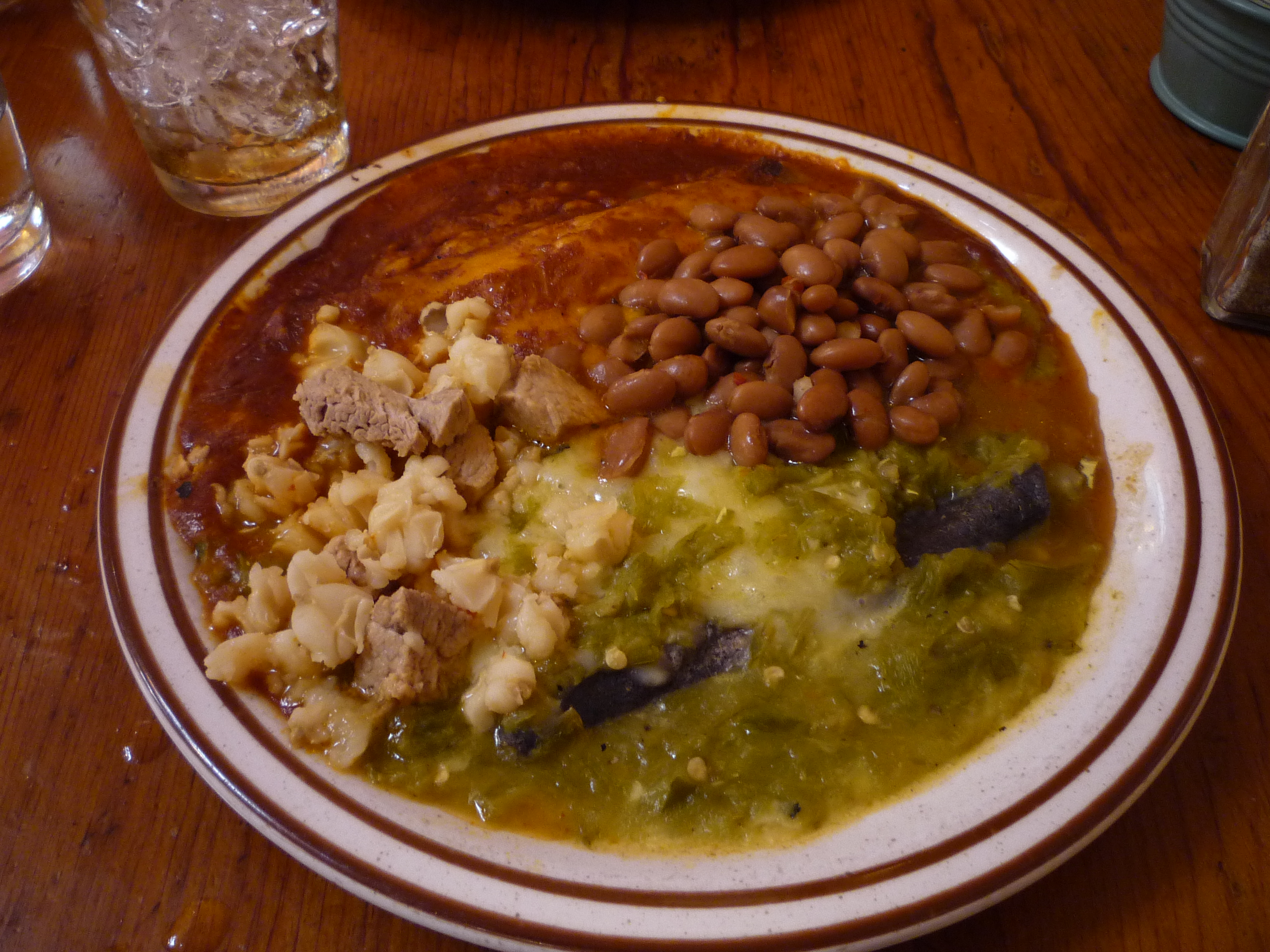
- Enchiladas at the Shed
- Interactive map of The Shed

Restaurant information
- Location: 113½ East Palace Avenue, Sante Fe, New Mexico, 87501, United States
- Coordinates: 35°41′15″N 105°56′13″W

The Shed is a restaurant in Santa Fe, New Mexico. The business was named one of "America's Classics" by the James Beard Foundation Awards.
