= El Chorro Lodge =

Restaurant in Paradise Valley, Arizona, U.S.

Coordinates: 33.53181°N 111.96098°W

- Interactive map of El Chorro Lodge

Restaurant information
- Location: Paradise Valley, Maricopa County, Arizona, 85253, United States
- Website: elchorro.com

El Chorro Lodge is a restaurant in Paradise Valley, Arizona. The business was named one of "America's Classics" by the James Beard Foundation Awards.
