= Galleria Umberto (restaurant) =

Pizzeria in Boston, Massachusetts, U.S.

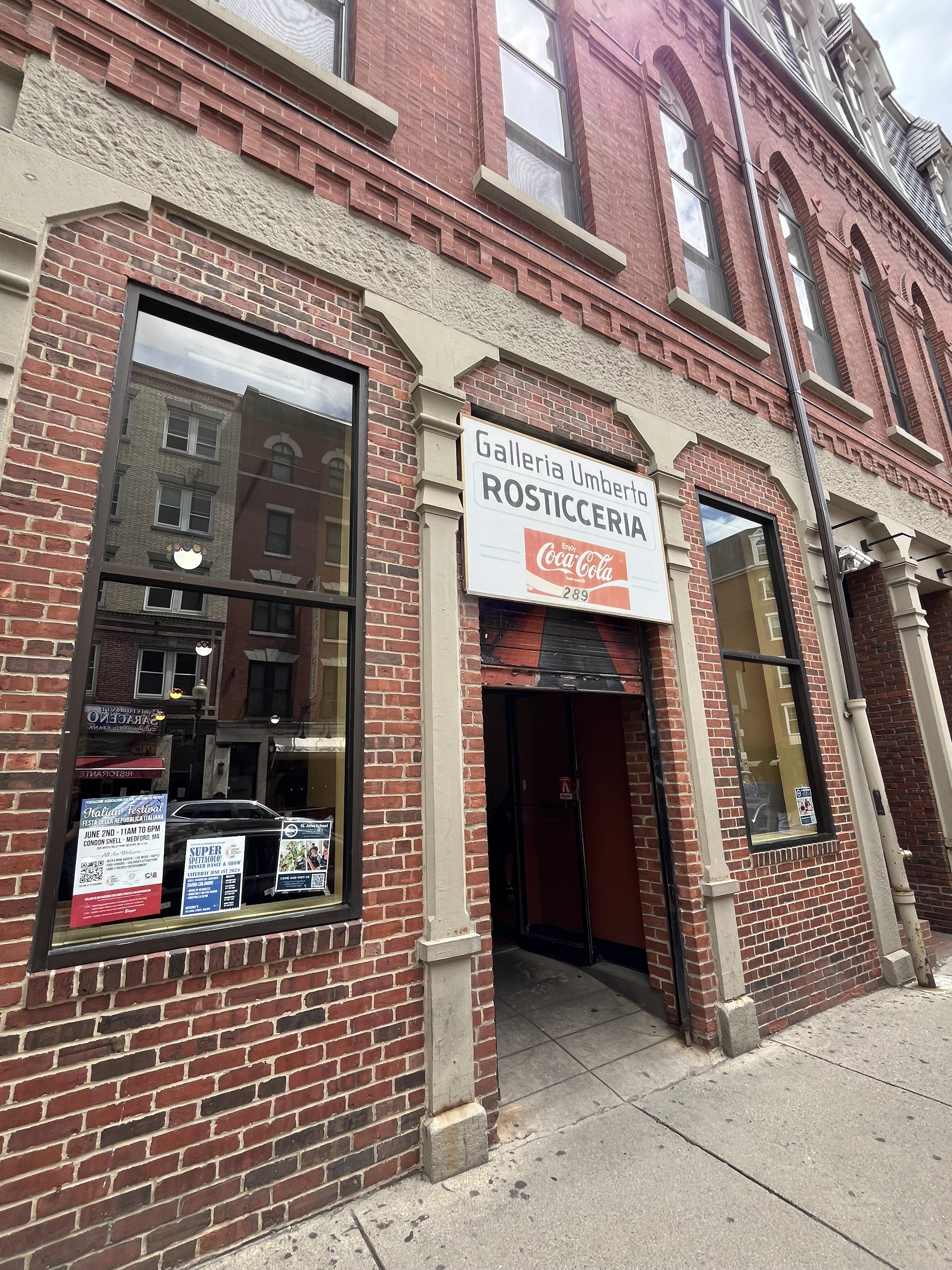
- Interactive map of Galleria Umberto

Restaurant information
- Established: 1974
- Owners: Paul and Ralph Deuterio
- Previous owner: Umberto Deuterio
- Food type: Italian (pizza)
- Dress code: casual
- Location: 289 Hanover Street, Boston, Suffolk, Massachusetts, 02113, United States
- Coordinates: 42.36379°N 71.05431°W

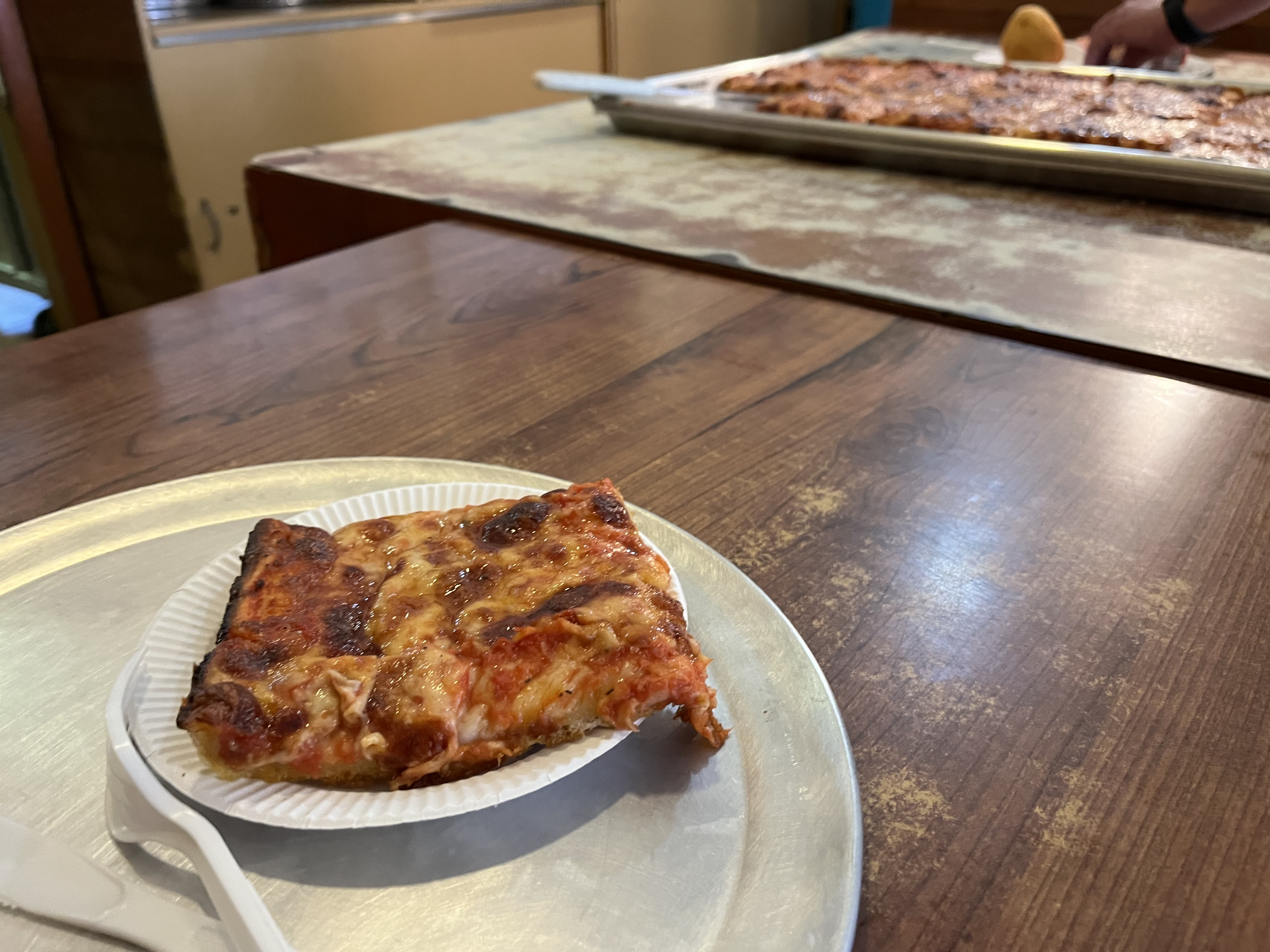
Pizza at Galleria Umberto

Galleria Umberto is a cash only pizzeria in Boston's North End that specializes in Sicilian-style pizza and was named an America’s Classic by the James Beard Foundation in 2018. They are open only for lunch and when they sell out, they close for the day.

== History ==
Umberto Deuterio founded Galleria Umberto in 1974 and passed it down to his sons Paul and Ralph.

The building was originally a church. The New Brick Church was torn down in the 1840s and is known locally as the Cockerel Church because of the shape of its rooftop weathervane. The spire of the church that replaced it was destroyed by a hurricane about 40 years later. The original rooster weathervane was designed by Shem Drowne.

== Menu and Reputation ==
The menu is limited to a few traditional items, most notably:

- Sicilian Pizza: Thick-crust, square slices known for their caramelized cheese edges.
- Arancini: Italian rice balls stuffed with ground beef, peas, and mozzarella.
- Panzarotti: Fried potato croquettes.

=== Critical reception ===
The restaurant is frequently cited by local and national media as one of the best "bang-for-your-buck" lunch options in Boston. In 2018, the James Beard Foundation designated Galleria Umberto as an "America's Classic," praising the Deuterio family for maintaining the "character of their community" despite the changing landscape of the North End. In 2022, Boston Magazine named it the "Best Sicilian Pizza" in the city.
