= Wo Hop =

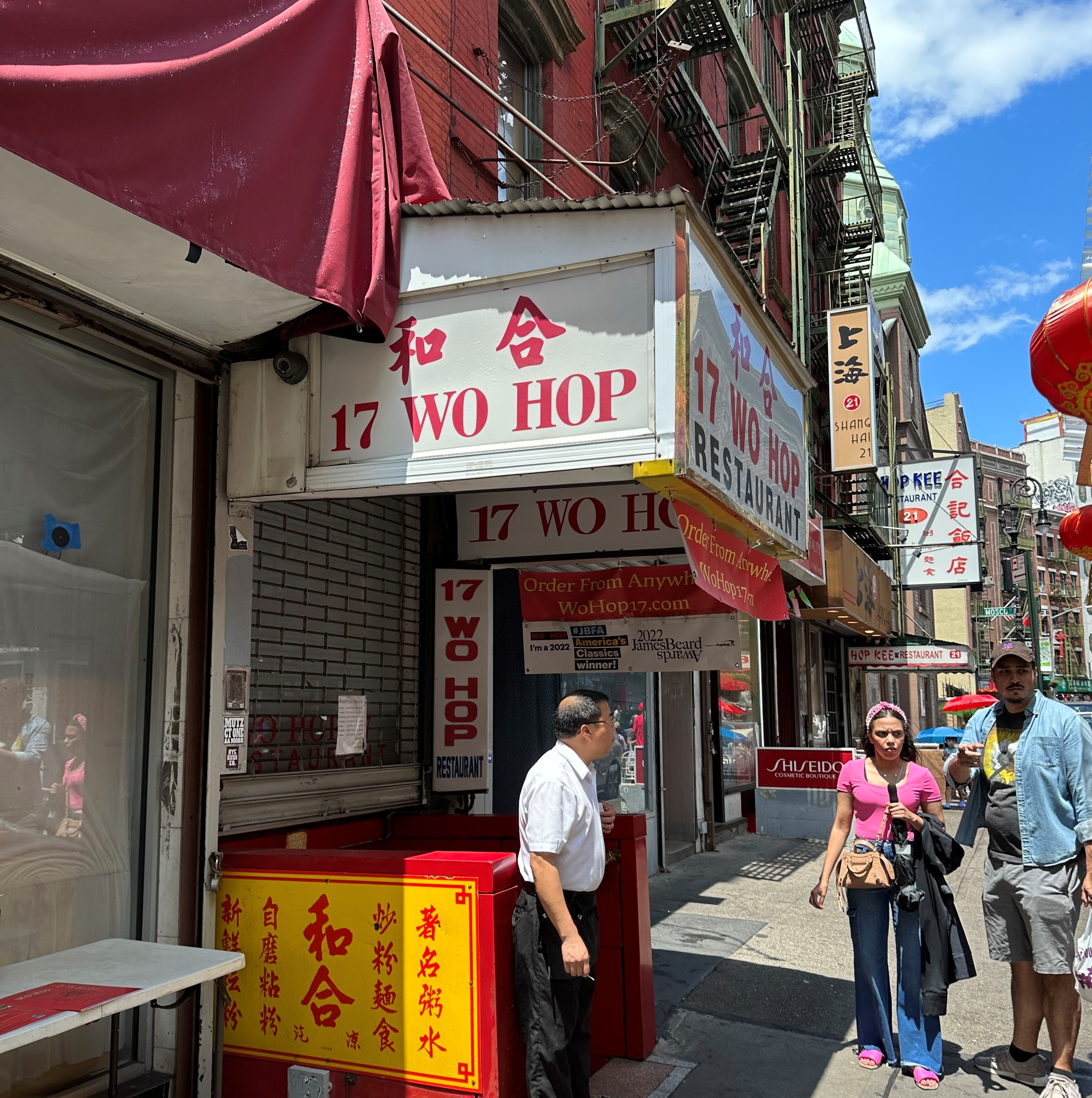
- Exterior of Wo Hop restaurant in July 2023
- Interactive map of Wo Hop

Restaurant information
- Established: 1938
- Owner: Huang family
- Food type: Chinese
- Location: 17 Mott Street, Manhattan, New York, 10013, USA
- Coordinates: 40°42′51.5″N 73°59′56″W
- Website: https://www.wohop17.com/

Wo Hop is a Chinese restaurant in Manhattan's Chinatown that was named an American Classic in 2022 by the James Beard Foundation Award. It is the second-oldest restaurant in Manhattan's Chinatown. The restaurant is located at 17 Mott Street, downstairs entrance.

In June 2025, Wo Hop expanded onto street level with a new dining room. The new space is a collaboration with David Leung, the third-generation owner of Wo Hop, and T.K. Justin Ng, an architect.
