= Los Hernandez =

Restaurant in Union Gap, Washington, U.S.

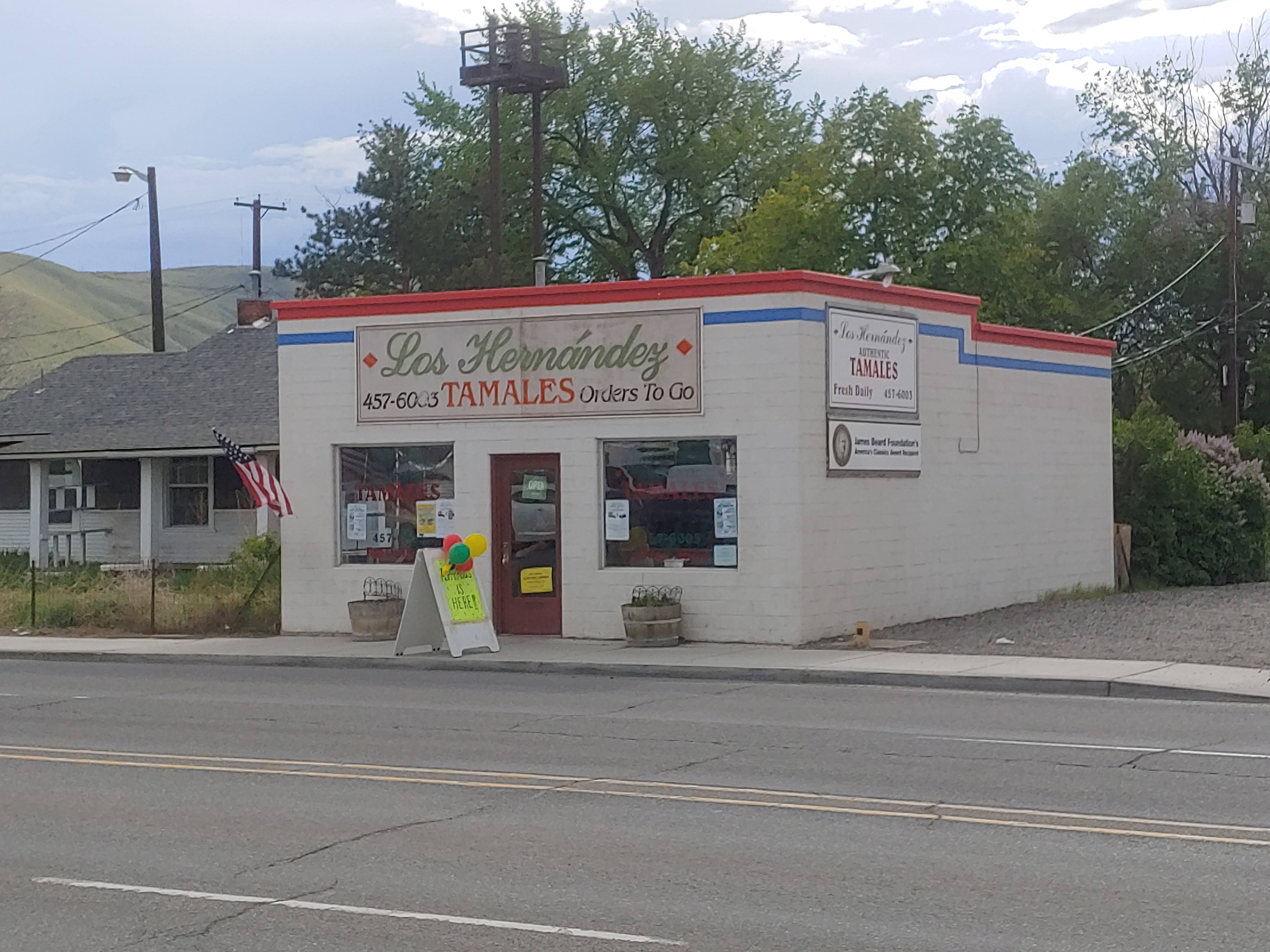
- Interactive map of Los Hernandez

Restaurant information
- Established: 1990
- Owners: June and Felipe Hernandez
- Food type: Mexican tamales
- Rating: James Beard America's Classics
- Location: 3706 Main Street, Union Gap, Yakima, Washington, United States
- Coordinates: 46.5505°N 120.4756°W
- Website: loshernandeztamales.com

Los Hernandez is a restaurant in Union Gap, Washington. In 2018 it was named one of America's Classics by the James Beard Foundation.

== History ==
Felipe Hernandez's family immigrated from Piedras Negras in Coahuila, Mexico, on the Texas border, to work in agriculture in Eastern Washington's Yakima Valley in 1957. Hernandez worked for Montgomery Ward for nearly two decades; in 1990 Hernandez and his wife June opened the restaurant.

== Menu ==
The restaurant serves only tamales. The recipe is based on that of Hernandez's sister, Leocaldia Sanchez. The restaurant mills its own corn to produce the masa for the tamales. Production is seasonal, with an asparagus tamale the focus during the area's major spring harvest.

== Recognition ==
In 2018 the restaurant was named one of America's Classics by the James Beard Foundation. The Seattle Times in 2015 called the restaurant's tamales "destination tamales", noting the guest book for the restaurant nearly three hours from Seattle listed visitors from Argentina, China, and England. Afar called it "traditional Mexican cuisine at its finest level of execution".
