= H&H Car Wash and Coffee Shop =

Defunct restaurant in El Paso, Texas, U.S.

- Interactive map of H&H Car Wash and Coffee Shop

Restaurant information
- Location: 701 East Yandell Drive, El Paso, Texas, 79902, United States
- Coordinates: 31°45′59″N 106°29′12″W

H&H Car Wash and Coffee Shop was a restaurant in El Paso, Texas. The business was named one of "America's Classics" by the James Beard Foundation Awards in 2001.
