= Bertha's Kitchen =

Restaurant in Charleston, South Carolina, U.S.

Coordinates: 32.8381°N 79.9607°W

- Interactive map of Bertha's Kitchen

Restaurant information
- Food type: Gullah cuisine
- Location: 2332 Meeting Street Rd., Charleston, South Carolina, United States

Bertha's Kitchen is a restaurant in Charleston, South Carolina. The restaurant was in 2017 named one of America's Classics by the James Beard Foundation.

== History ==
The restaurant was founded by Albertha Grant in 1980 or 1981 after her son bought a small motel and asked her to start a restaurant in it.

The restaurant is located in Charleston's Union Heights neighborhood on North Meeting Street. It is decorated with family portraits by a local muralist and family friend. It is located a few miles north of downtown.

== Menu ==
The menu is influenced by Gullah cuisine and includes fried chicken, fried pork chops, fried whiting, red rice, stewed chicken neck with gizzards, lima beans, macaroni and cheese, collard greens, and corn bread. Travel+Leisure called the gumbo soup a "must-try" Charleston dish. Jane and Michael Stern call out the lima beans. Multiple commenters call out the fried chicken.

== Ownership ==
Grant died in 2007. As of 2017 the owners were Grant's daughters, Julia Grant, Linda Pinckney, and Sharon Coakley. In 2022, in the fallout from the COVID pandemic, the family put the building on the market, citing pandemic-related staffing issues. Their intention was to relocate to a smaller location.

== Recognition ==
In 2017 the restaurant was named by the James Beard Foundation as one of America's Classics.
