= Bowen's Island Restaurant =

Restaurant in Charleston, South Carolina, U.S.

- Interactive map of Bowen's Island Restaurant

Restaurant information
- Established: 1946
- Owner: Robert Barber
- Previous owner: Mae Bowen
- Food type: lowcountry cuisine
- Location: 1870 Bowens Island Road, Charleston, South Carolina, 29412, United States
- Coordinates: 32°40′31″N 79°57′53″W

Bowen's Island Restaurant is a restaurant serving lowcountry cuisine in Charleston, South Carolina. In 2006 it was named one of America's Classics by the James Beard Foundation.

The restaurant was opened in 1946 by Mae Bowen. As of 2016 it was run by her grandson, Robert Barber.

Starting in 1983 photographer Cramer Gallimore documented the restaurant; his work was showcased at the 2012 Charleston Wine + Food Festival.
