= Gaido's =

Restaurant in Galveston, Texas, U.S.

- Interactive map of Gaido's

Restaurant information
- Location: 3828 Seawall Boulevard, Galveston, Texas, 77550
- Coordinates: 29°16′46″N 94°48′16″W

Gaido's is a seafood restaurant in Galveston, Texas, United States. It was named one of "America's Classics" by the James Beard Foundation in 2025.
