= Lucky Wishbone =

Restaurant in Anchorage, Alaska U.S.

- Interactive map of Lucky Wishbone

Restaurant information
- Coordinates: 61.2176°N 149.8634°W

Lucky Wishbone is a restaurant in Anchorage, Alaska, United States. It was named one of "America's Classics" by the James Beard Foundation in 2025.
