= Three Brothers Serbian Restaurant =

Restaurant in Milwaukee, Wisconsin

Coordinates: 43.00025°N 87.89319°W

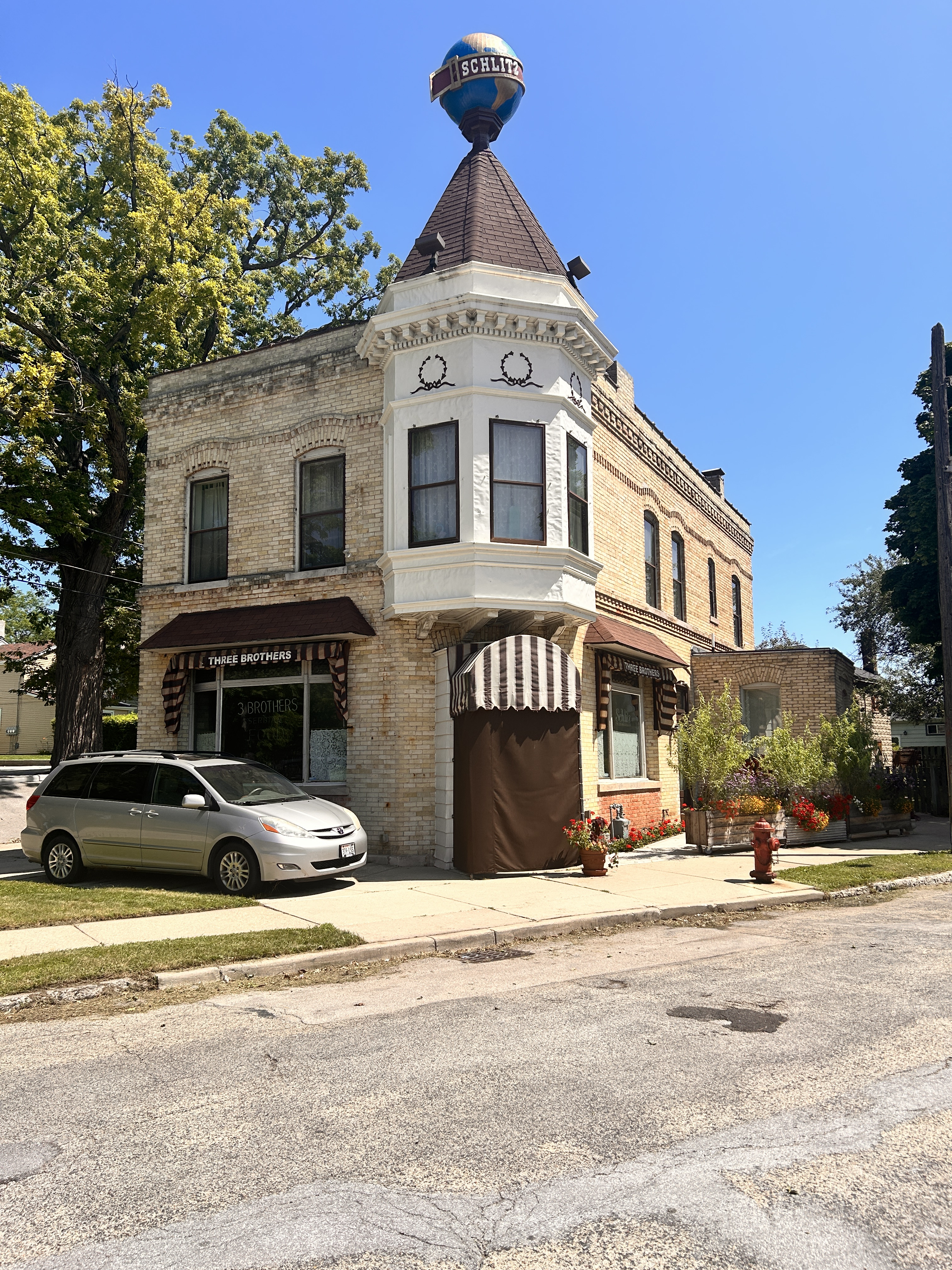

Three Brothers Serbian Restaurant is a restaurant opened in 1956 by Milun Radicevic in the Bay View section neighborhood of Milwaukee. He named the restaurant after his three sons who were still living in Yugoslavia.

== History ==
Branko Radicevic came to the U.S. a few years after his father and in 1972 joined the family business.

The restaurant "is housed in a historic Schlitz tavern, a location Milun selected 60 years ago" and was "an award-winning restaurant known for its Serbian fare and homey ambience."

Originally called Big Mike's because Milun's name was Americanized to Mike, Milun had owned two restaurants in Yugoslavia as well as other food industry businesses. Three Bros. continues its award-winning food and service in the capable hands of Branko and Patricia's children, Milunka and Branko Jr.

== Honors ==
Carol Deptolla named the restaurant several times in the Milwaukee Journal Sentinel Top 30. They have "been featured in Bon Appétit magazine, now-defunct Gourmet magazine, and on the Food Network." In 2002 they won a James Beard Foundation Award as an American Classic, a prestigious list of “eateries that have carved out a special place on the American culinary landscape” "which recognizes regional, often family-owned establishments that exemplify quality food, local character and lasting appeal."
