= Sun Wah BBQ =

Restaurant in Chicago, Illinois, U.S.

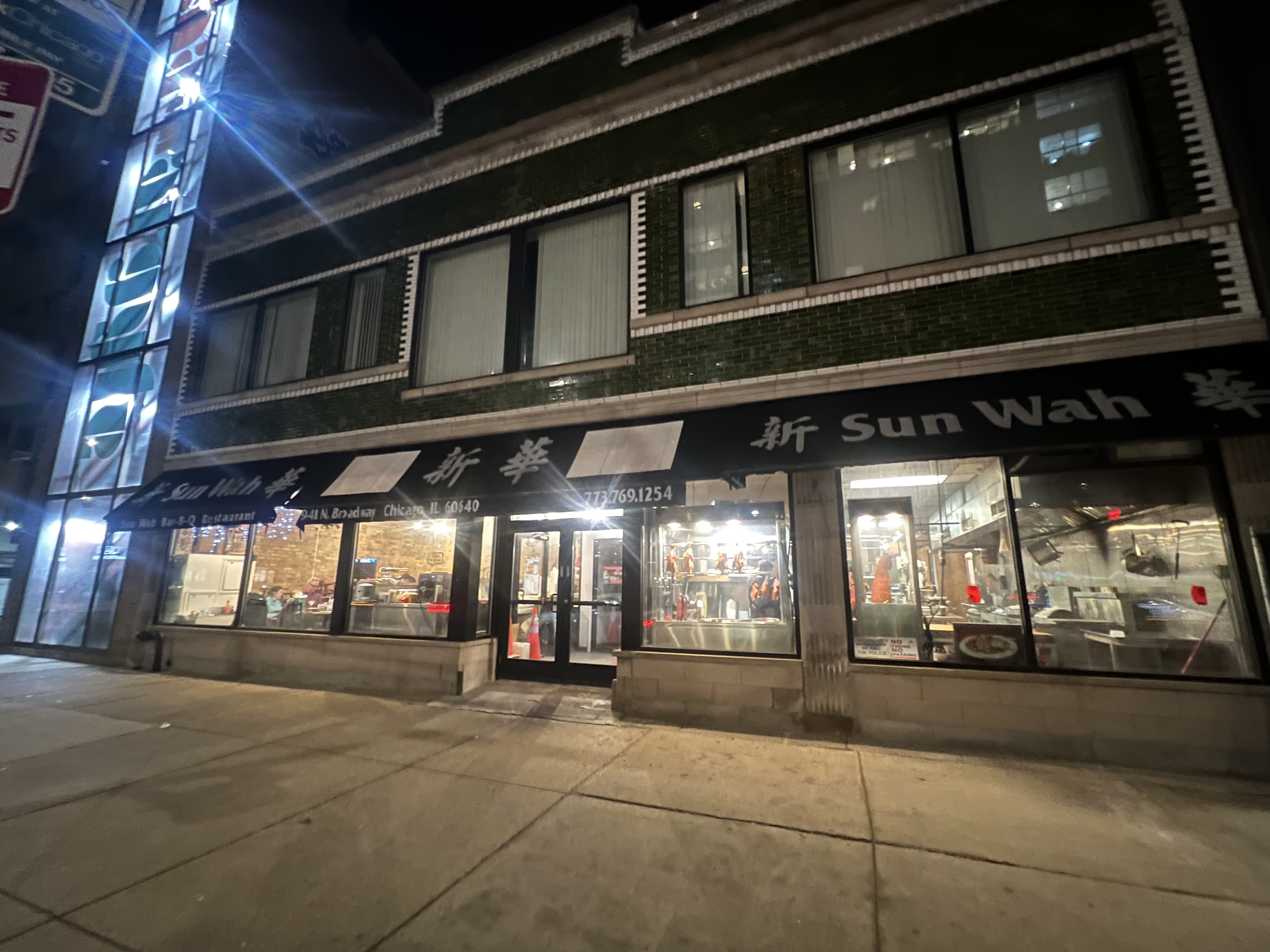
- Interactive map of Sun Wah BBQ

Restaurant information
- Established: 1986
- Owners: Laura Cheng, Kelly Cheng, Michael Cheng
- Previous owners: Lynda and Eric Cheng
- Food type: Hong Kong-style barbecue
- Location: 5039 N Broadway, Chicago, Illinois, 60640, U.S.
- Coordinates: 41°58′26.3″N 87°39′34.5″W
- Reservations: Reservations or walk-ins available
- Website: sunwahbbq.com

Sun Wah is a restaurant in Chicago, Illinois. In 2018 it was named one of America's Classics by the James Beard Foundation.

== History ==
Lynda and Eric Cheng opened the restaurant in Uptown Chicago in 1986. Their children Laura Cheng, Kelly Cheng, and Michael Cheng took over in 2008.

== Menu ==
The restaurant focusses on Hong Kong-style barbecue.

The restaurant is known for its Beijing Duck Feast, a three-course dinner with Peking duck carved tableside and served with gua bao, sauce, and garnishes. After serving the duck, the carcass is returned to the kitchen to be turned into duck fried rice or duck noodles, and then duck soup, the next courses. The dinner is an off-menu offering.

The restaurant also offers other specialties such as roast whole chicken and whole pig.

The restaurant also offers a roasting service for Thanksgiving.

== Recognition ==
In 2018 the restaurant was named one of America's Classics by the James Beard Foundation. In 2021 Chicago Magazine included the restaurant's Beijing Duck Feast in their list of iconic Chicago dishes.
