= Joe T. Garcia's =

Restaurant in Fort Worth, Texas, U.S.

- Interactive map of Joe T. Garcia's

Restaurant information
- Established: 1935
- Location: Fort Worth, Texas, United States
- Coordinates: 32.78456°N 97.34831°W

Joe T. Garcia's is a restaurant in Fort Worth, Texas, United States. Established in 1935, it was named one of "America's Classics" by the James Beard Foundation.

== See also ==
- List of James Beard America's Classics
