= Pheasant Restaurant and Lounge =

Restaurant in Brookings South Dakota, U.S.

- Interactive map of Pheasant Restaurant and Lounge

Restaurant information
- Established: 1949
- Location: 726 Main Ave S., Brookings, South Dakota, 57006, United States
- Coordinates: 44°17′51″N 96°47′57″W

Pheasant Restaurant and Lounge is a restaurant in Brookings, South Dakota, United States. Established in 1949 as a cafe and gas station, the restaurant was named an "America's Classic" by the James Beard Foundation in 2024.

== See also ==
- List of James Beard America's Classics
