= Bagaduce Lunch =

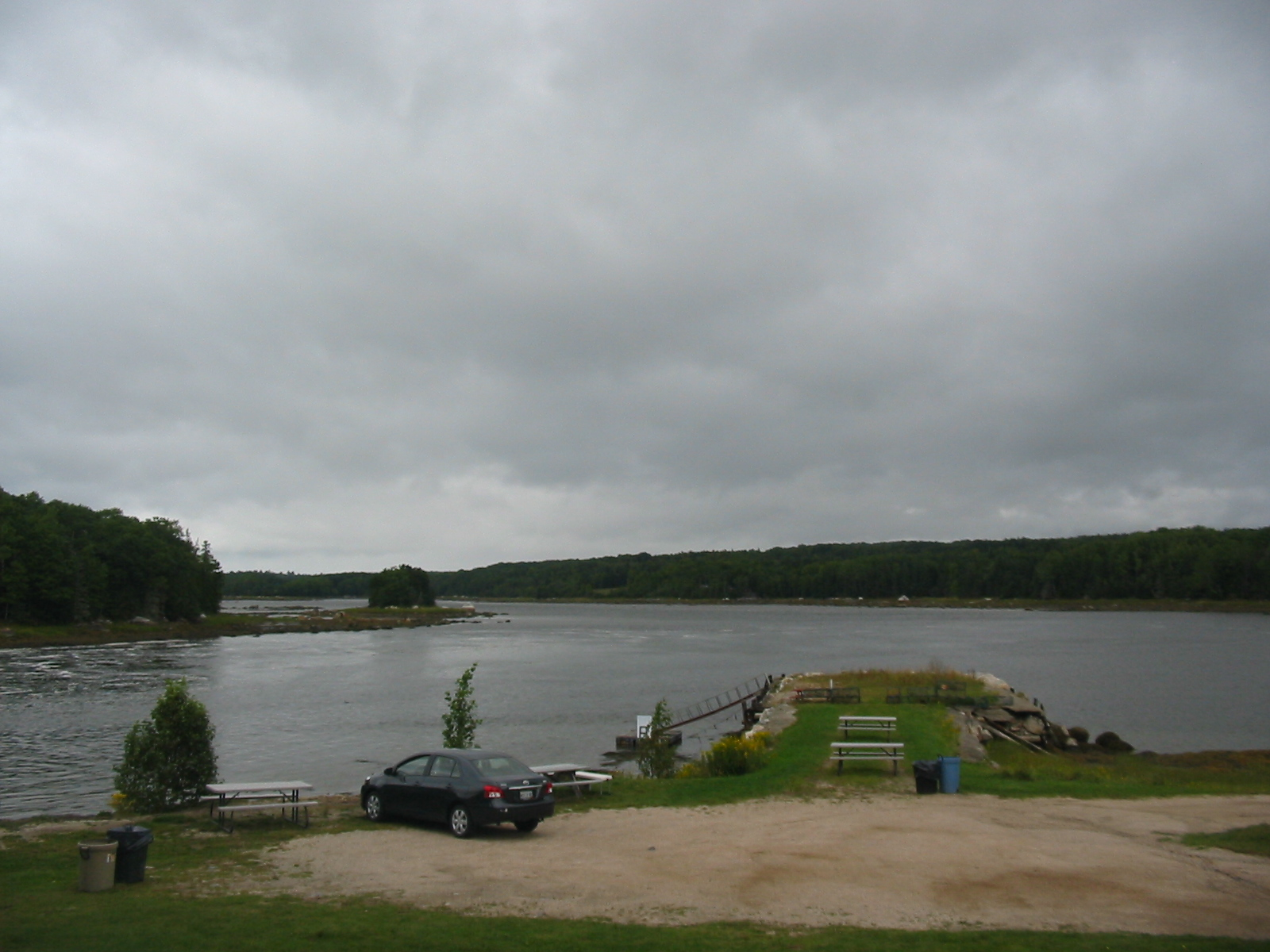
- View from restaurant on Bagaduce River
- Interactive map of Bagaduce Lunch

Restaurant information
- Established: 1946; 80 years ago
- Location: 145 Frank's Flat, Penobscot, Maine, 04476, United States
- Coordinates: 44°23′53″N 68°42′13″W

Bagaduce Lunch seafood restaurant is located in Penobscot, Maine. It is a James Beard Foundation Award winning restaurant (2008).

== History ==
Bagaduce Lunch was opened as a roadside fish shack in 1946 by Sidney and Bernice Snow, their granddaughter, Judy Astbury and her husband Mike have run the restaurant since 1996. Judy's mother and father, Vangie and James Peasely, took over in 1967 and ran it for thirty years in between.

== Menu ==
The owners pride themselves on serving only fresh and locally sourced fish. It is a seasonal operation, generally open Memorial Day through Labor Day. The seafood menu has not changed since 1946.

== Awards and honors ==
- 2008 James Beard Foundation Award America's Classic
- MAINE-LY LOBSTER: Best Lobster Shacks & Rolls
- The Today Show named it one of the top ten lobster shacks in Maine

== See also ==
- List of seafood restaurants
