= Lexington Barbecue =

Restaurant in Lexington, North Carolina, U.S.

- Interactive map of Lexington Barbecue

Restaurant information
- Established: 1962
- Location: 100 Smokehouse Lane, Lexington, North Carolina, 27295, United States
- Coordinates: 35°50′02″N 80°16′03″W

Lexington Barbecue is a restaurant in Lexington, North Carolina, United States. It was established in 1962, and was named one of "America's Classics" by the James Beard Foundation in 2003.

== See also ==
- List of James Beard America's Classics
