= Perini Ranch Steakhouse =

Restaurant in Buffalo Gap, Texas, U.S.

- Interactive map of Perini Ranch Steakhouse

Restaurant information
- Location: 3002 FM 89, Buffalo Gap, Texas, 79508, United States
- Coordinates: 32°16′18″N 99°50′38″W

Perini Ranch Steakhouse is a restaurant in Buffalo Gap, Texas.

== See also ==
- List of James Beard America's Classics
