= Gustavus Inn =

Defunct restaurant in Gustavus, Alaska, U.S.

- Interactive map of Gustavus Inn

Restaurant information
- Location: 1270 Gustavus Road, Gustavus, Alaska, 99826, United States
- Coordinates: 58°24′49″N 135°43′53″W

Gustavus Inn was a restaurant and hotel in Gustavus, Alaska, United States. The restaurant was named one of "America's Classics" by the James Beard Foundation in 2010.

== Description ==
The menu included Dungeness crab, halibut, sablefish, salmon, and sourdough rolls with rhubarb jam.

== History ==
Jack and Sally Lesh purchased the Inn in 1965. The business was taken over by JoAnn and David Lesh in 1980.

The property was sold to the Hoonah Lingít tribe in 2021. The tribe planned to use the property as a cultural center.

== Reception ==
The restaurant was named one of "America's Classics" by the James Beard Foundation in 2010.

== See also ==
- List of James Beard America's Classics
