= Charlie's Sandwich Shoppe =

Historic restaurant in Boston, Massachusetts

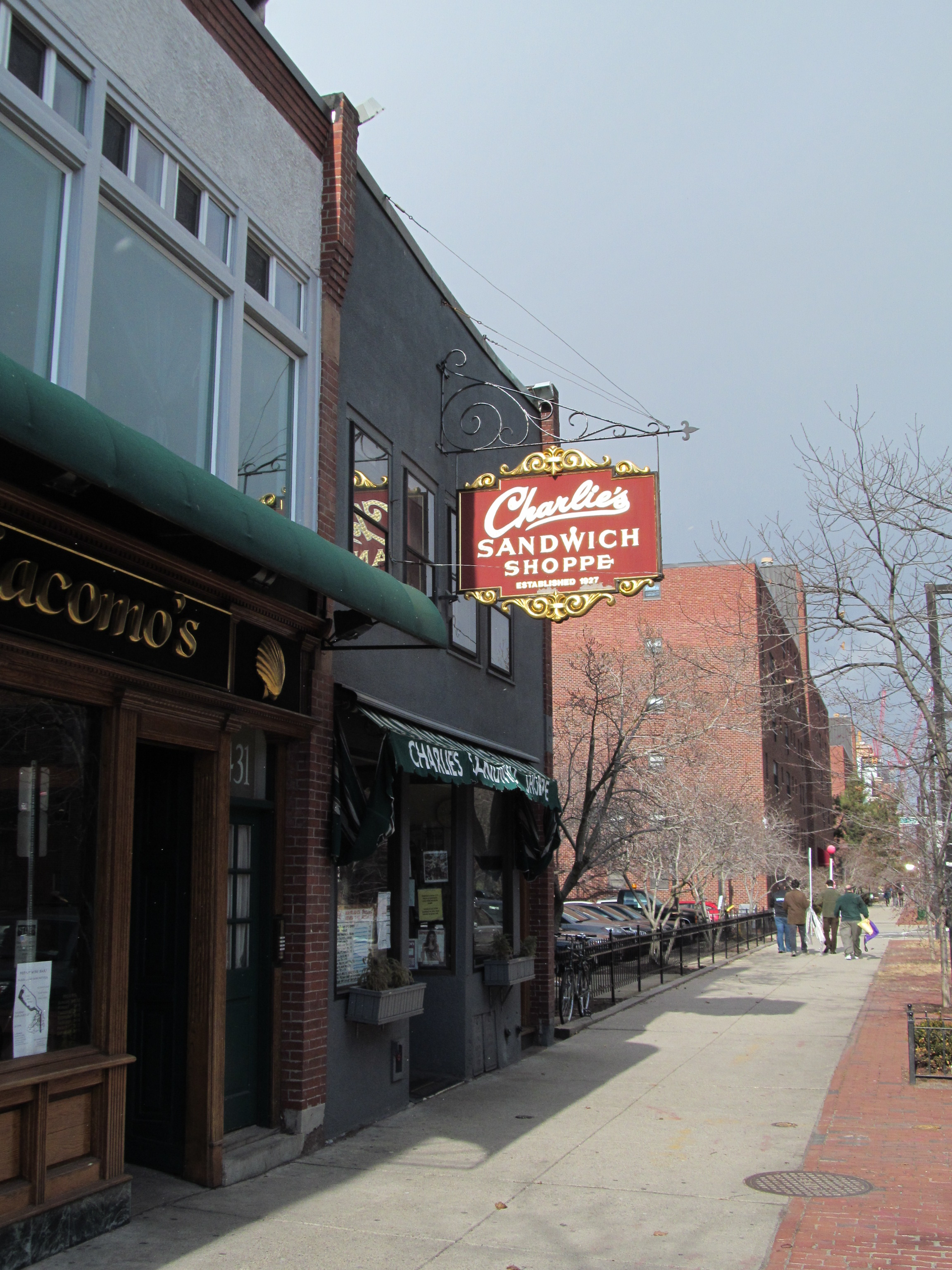
- The exterior of the restaurant
- Interactive map of Charlie's Sandwich Shoppe

Restaurant information
- Coordinates: 42.3448°N 71.0778°W

Charlie's Sandwich Shoppe is a restaurant located in Boston's South End that is known for serving African-American jazz musicians during the era of segregated hotels.

The walls of the diner are adorned with pictures of customers ranging from Sammy Davis Jr., Duke Ellington, and Cab Calloway, to Vice President Al Gore, President Barack Obama to Governor Deval Patrick. As a child, Sammy Davis, Jr. used to tap dance in front of the restaurant for change.

Charlie's has been described as "equal parts old-school diner and neighborhood coffee shop", but among the locals it is known for its breakfasts. It has been open since 1927 and while in 2008 there were no patron bathrooms one was later added. There are only 32 seats, 13 of which lie along a counter across from wooden refrigerators purchased in 1927. Charlie's was open 24 hours a day, 7 days a week for 32 straight years. When Charlie's finally decided to close on Sundays, nobody had a key, and one needed to be made.

The floor above Charlie's was a union hall for the Brotherhood of Sleeping Car Porters, the first black porters union founded by A. Philip Randolph.

Charlie's has won numerous awards over the years, culminating in the reception of a James Beard Foundation Award in 2005 in the category of America's Classics.

There is now a web-project history of the restaurant entitled Where Hash Rules. The story was written by George Aaron Cuddy; original photographs were taken by Brooke T. Wolin.

On May 12, 2014, Charlie's announced that it was closing at the end of June 2014, ending its 87-year run. On August 5, 2014, South End restaurateur, Evan Deluty, announced he would be re-opening Charlie's Sandwich Shoppe and that the breakfast and that the lunch menu would remain unchanged, but a new dinner menu would be added along with expanded hours.

A remodeled Charlie's Sandwich Shoppe re-opened on January 22, 2016.
