= Figaretti's Italian Restaurant =

- Interactive map of Figaretti's Italian Restaurant

Restaurant information
- Owner: Dino Figaretti
- Food type: Italian
- Location: 1035 Mount Dechantal Road, Wheeling, West Virginia, United States
- Coordinates: 40.0661°N 80.6926°W

Figaretti's Restaurant is an Italian restaurant in Wheeling, West Virginia, United States. Established in the late 1940s, it received a James Beard America's Classics award in 2026. Dino Figaretti is the owner. Figaretti's was named the area's best Italian restaurant in the Best of the Ohio Valley Readers Choice Awards in 2017 and 2025.

== See also ==
- List of Italian restaurants
