= Nezinscot Farm =

Farm and restaurant in Turner, Maine

Coordinates: 44°16′3″N 70°14′21″W

- Interactive map of Nezinscot Farm

Restaurant information
- Owners: Gloria and Gregg Varney
- Location: 284 Turner Center Road, Turner, Androscoggin, Maine, United States
- Website: www.nezinscotfarm.com

Nezinscot Farm is a family-operated farm and restaurant in Turner, Maine.

== History ==
The restaurant was owned by Gloria and Gregg Varney since 1987.

== See also ==
- List of James Beard America's Classics
