= Mandalay (restaurant) =

Restaurant in San Francisco, U.S.

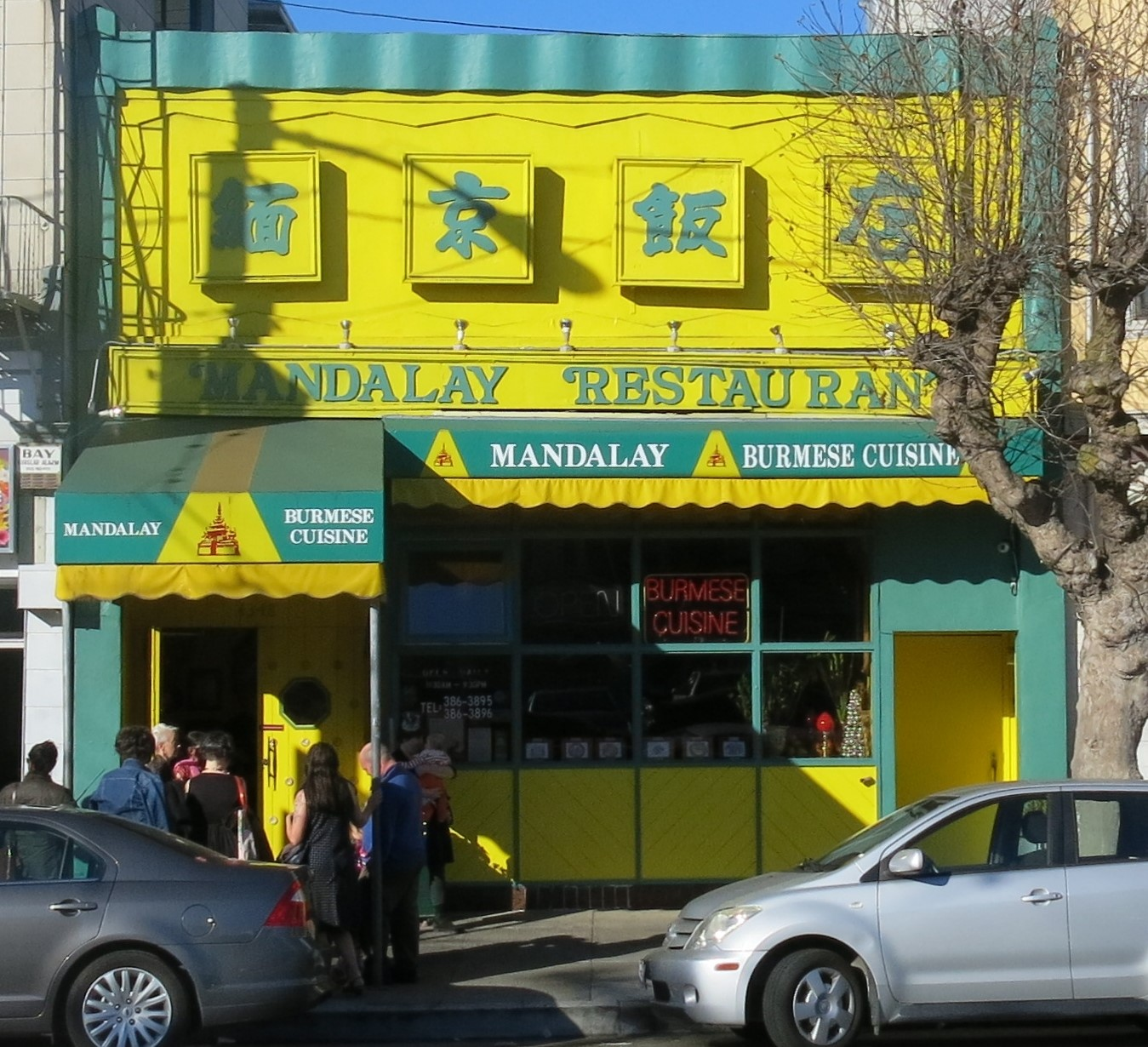
- The restaurant in 2014
- Interactive map of Mandalay

Restaurant information
- Established: February 4, 1984
- Owners: Kevin Chen; Sherry Dung
- Food type: Burmese
- Location: 4348 California Street, San Francisco, California, 94118, United States
- Coordinates: 37°47′07″N 122°27′52″W
- Website: mandalaysf.com

Mandalay is a Burmese restaurant in San Francisco, California, United States. Established in 1984, the restaurant was named an "America's Classic" by the James Beard Foundation in 2024. It is co-owned by married couple Kevin Chen and Sherry Dung.

== Description ==
Located on 4348 California Street, the Burmese restaurant Mandalay serves tea leaf salad composed of lentil seeds, shrimp, garlic, and peanuts with imported tea leaves, as well as paratha, mohinga, and noodle and samusa soups.

== History ==
On February 4, 1984, Mandalay was opened. It is the oldest running Burmese restaurant in San Francisco. Kevin Chen became the owner in 2003 after his uncle.

== Reception ==
In 2024, Mandalay was deemed an "America's Classic" by the James Beard Foundation, who stated the restaurant "might be the best of the bunch" among Burmese restaurants within the city. Eater writer Lauren Saria included Mandalay in a list of the best restaurants in San Francisco, recommending the tea leaf salad, noodles, and samusa soup.

== See also ==
- List of James Beard America's Classics
