= Waterman's Beach Lobster =

Waterman's Beach Lobster was a family-owned lobster pound in South Thomaston, Maine. Anne Cousens (maiden name Waterman) opened it in 1986. Her daughter, Sandy Manahan, and daughter-in-law, Lorrie Cousens, closed the place on September 4, 2016. She didn't want to sell it "because we don't want our name to go downhill."

In addition to seafood such as lobster and steamed clams, the restaurant was known for the homemade pies baked by its founder, Anne Cousens.

In 2017, the Manahan family applied, and was approved, to turn the spot into a microbrewery and tasting room. Sandy's oldest son Heath operates “Waterman’s Beach Brewery” out of the same building

== Honors and awards ==
In 2001, Waterman's won an America's Classics award from the James Beard Foundation.

Epicurious named it one of their 7 Favorite Maine Lobster Shack, pointing out the seaside location (overlooking Penobscot Bay) and picnic tables.

== See also ==
- List of seafood restaurants
