= Doe's Eat Place =

Chain of restaurants in the United States

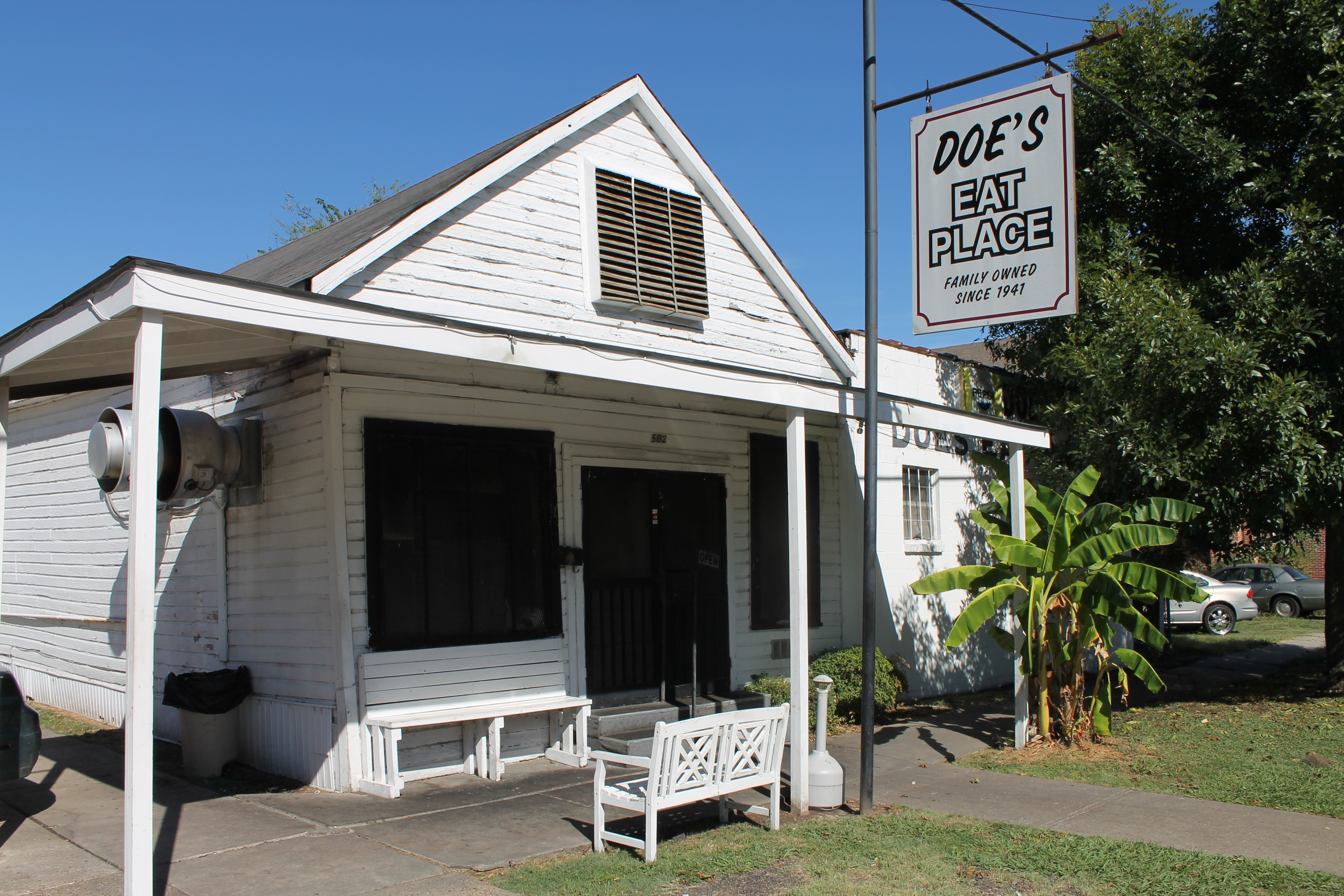
Doe's Eat Place

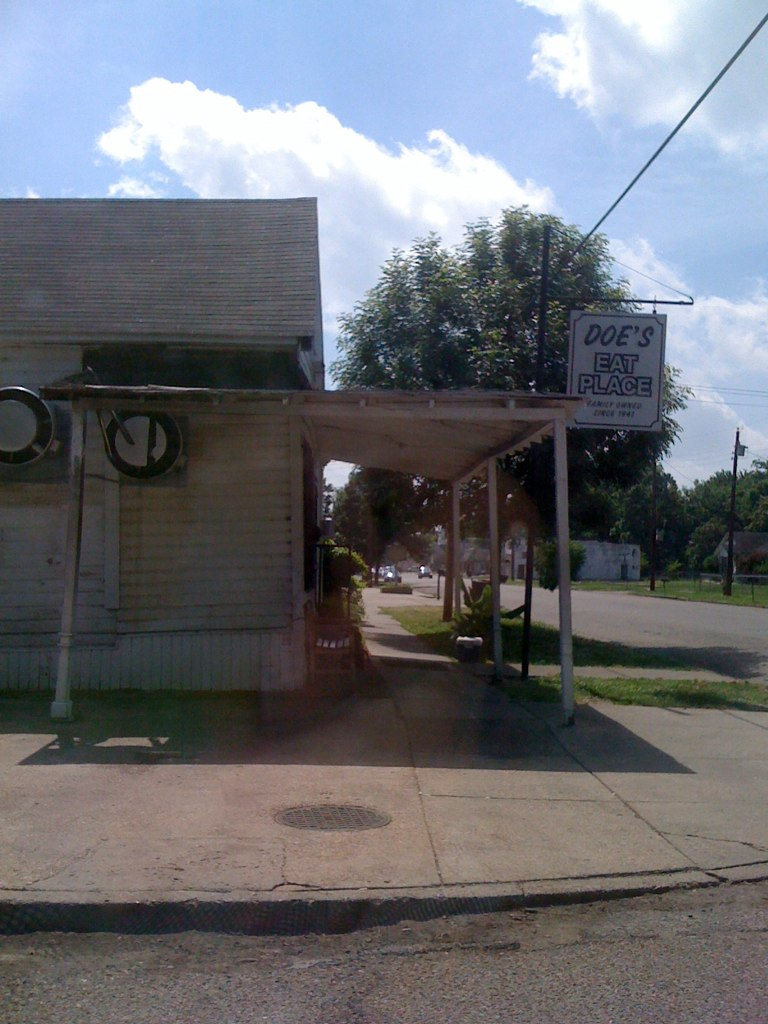
Doe's Eat Place in Greenville, Mississippi

Doe's Eat Place is a chain of restaurants in the United States established in Greenville, Mississippi in 1941 by Dominick "Big Doe" Signa and his wife, Mamie. Doe's father moved to Greenville in 1903 and opened a grocery store in the building that now serves as the restaurant. The family lived in a house behind the store. The grocery, which the Signa family called "Papa's Store," performed relatively well financially until the Great Mississippi Flood of 1927. After the flood, Big Doe Signa started a bootlegging business to help provide for his family. After several years he finally sold his 40-barrel still for $300 and a Ford Model T.

At first, Signa ran a honky-tonk, strictly for blacks, in the front part of the store. Buffalo fish and chili were regular menu items at that time. Because of the racial segregation at the time it was socially unacceptable for whites to come into Doe's. Therefore, when a local white doctor began to stop at Doe's for a meal between house calls, Doe would serve him steaks in the rear of the store. As word-of-mouth spread about the steaks, Doe decided to start a restaurant in the rear of the building. For a short time, the honky tonk and restaurant co-existed. As the restaurant continued to grow in popularity, the honky-tonk was eventually closed. The restaurant has been racially integrated since the beginning. "Big Doe" retired in 1974 and passed along the business to his two sons Doe Jr. and Charles. Doe, Sr. died on April 27, 1987, and Mamie died on November 5, 1955.

The original Doe's Eat Place is still run from the building in which it started. It is a relatively small and shabby building in the middle of a downscale neighborhood. The dining area contrasts with the outside of the building by being clean and nicely maintained. Doe's has been described as having a "dive-y atmosphere" and "ramshackle surroundings." Customers enter the restaurant through the kitchen, and are traditionally greeted by a member of the Signa family (usually male).

The original Greenville location was named to the James Beard Foundation's list of "America's Classics" in 2007. In 2012, the Greenville location was listed in the National Register of Historic Places.

Featured on Season 4 Episode 4 of Netflix’s Somebody Feed Phil, “The Mississippi Delta.”
