= Lagomarcino's =

Restaurant in Moline, Illinois, U.S.

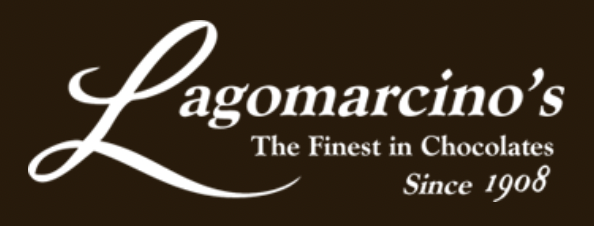
- Interactive map of Lagomarcino's

Restaurant information
- Location: 1422 5th Ave., Moline, Illinois, 61265, United States
- Coordinates: 41°30′21″N 90°31′0″W
- Website: lagomarcinos.com

Lagomarcino's is a restaurant in Moline, Illinois, United States. The soda fountain and chocolate shop was established by the Lagomarcino family in 1908. The business was named one of America's Classics by the James Beard Foundation Awards in 2006.
