= Sokolowski's University Inn =

Defunct restaurant in Cleveland, Ohio, U.S.

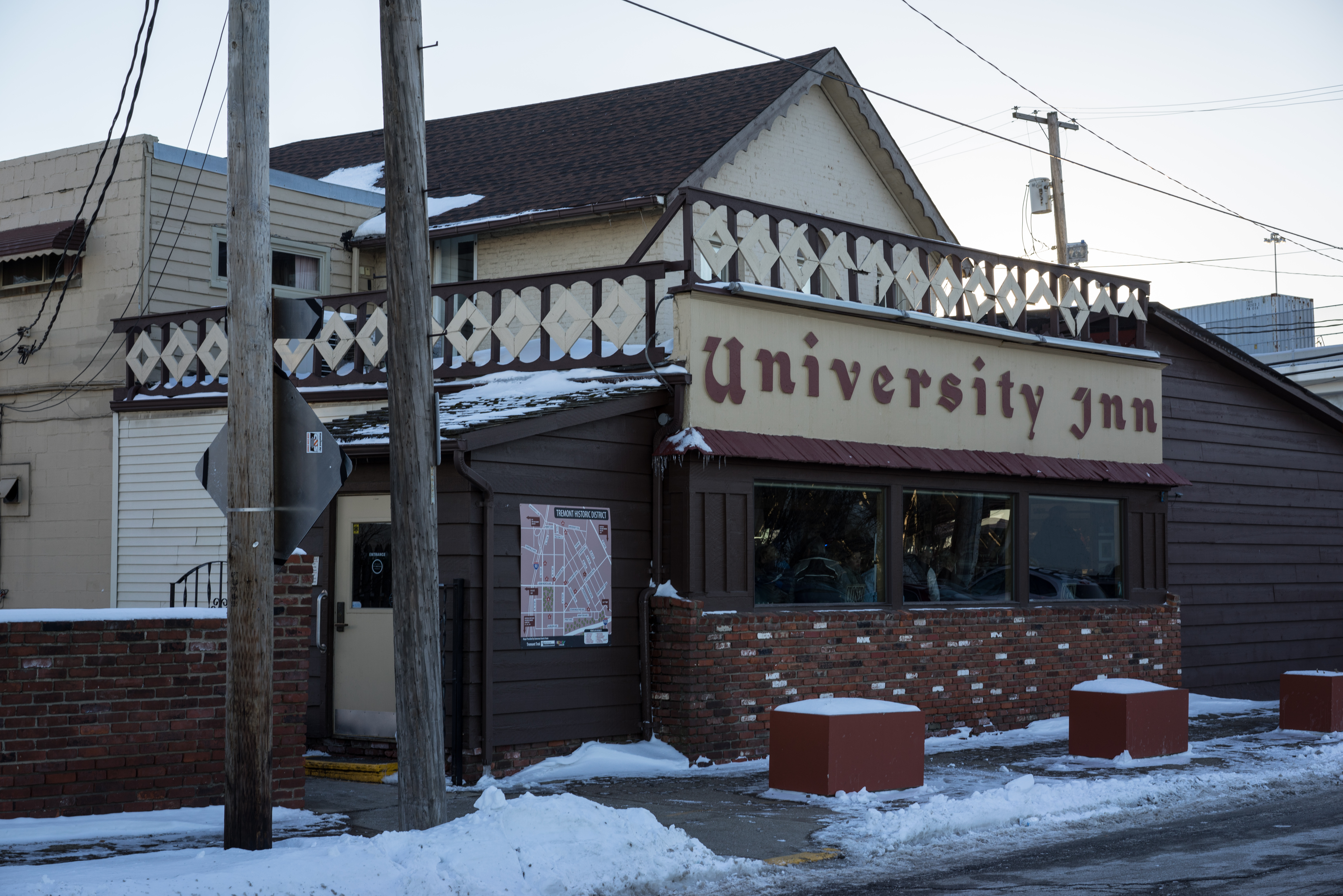
- Sokolowski's in 2014
- Interactive map of Sokolowski's University Inn

Restaurant information
- Established: 1923
- Closed: 2020
- Location: 1201 University Road, Cleveland, Ohio, United States
- Coordinates: 41°29′5″N 81°41′24.5″W

Sokolowski's University Inn was a restaurant in Cleveland, Ohio, United States. It was recognized as one of America's Classics by the James Beard Foundation.

== History ==
In 1923, Michael and Victoria Sokolowski opened Sokolowski's University Inn as a tavern in Cleveland's Tremont neighborhood. When the tavern opened, Tremont was called the South Side, and the neighborhood was densely populated. Large families occupied small homes and people from all different nationalities (Ukrainians, Russians, Poles, etc.) lived close to one another. When Interstate 490, 90, and 71 were constructed, hundreds of residential structures were lost. Although the new freeways cut the tavern off from their neighbors in the west, Sokolowski’s found new business among the iron workers. When the iron workers began constructing the Inner Belt Bridge in the late 1950s, the tavern transformed itself into a full restaurant. Over its history, the restaurant expanded to include three dining rooms and remained in the Sokolowski family through three generations.

Sokolowski's University Inn operated in a modified cafeteria style serving Polish and Eastern European specialties such as pierogis, chicken paprikash, and stuffed cabbage. Sokolowski's great food garnered attention outside of Cleveland. Sokolowski’s captured the attention of Anthony Bourdain appearing on “No Reservations” in 2007 and on Michael Symon’s show “The Best Thing I Ever Ate” in 2010. By, 2014 this fan favorite restaurant, won the James Beard “American Classics” Award, which is a prestigious award for quality restaurant and food establishments. This restaurant has fed many famous hungry travelers: Bobby Flay, President Bill Clinton, Jimmy Fallon, Lech Walesa, Ursula Andress, and many others.

In 2016, Sokolowski's became the oldest family-run restaurant in the city. Despite its long history and popularity, Sokolowski's closed its doors on October 13, 2020 due to the COVID-19 pandemic. In 2023 the building was sold to developer Redbird Tremont.

== Recognition ==
In 2014 it was named one of America's Classics by the James Beard Foundation.

== See also ==
- James Beard Foundation Award: 2010s
- List of defunct restaurants of the United States
- List of James Beard America's Classics
