= Shady Glen =

Historic restaurant in Manchester, Connecticut, United States

Coordinates: 41.7856°N 72.4851°W

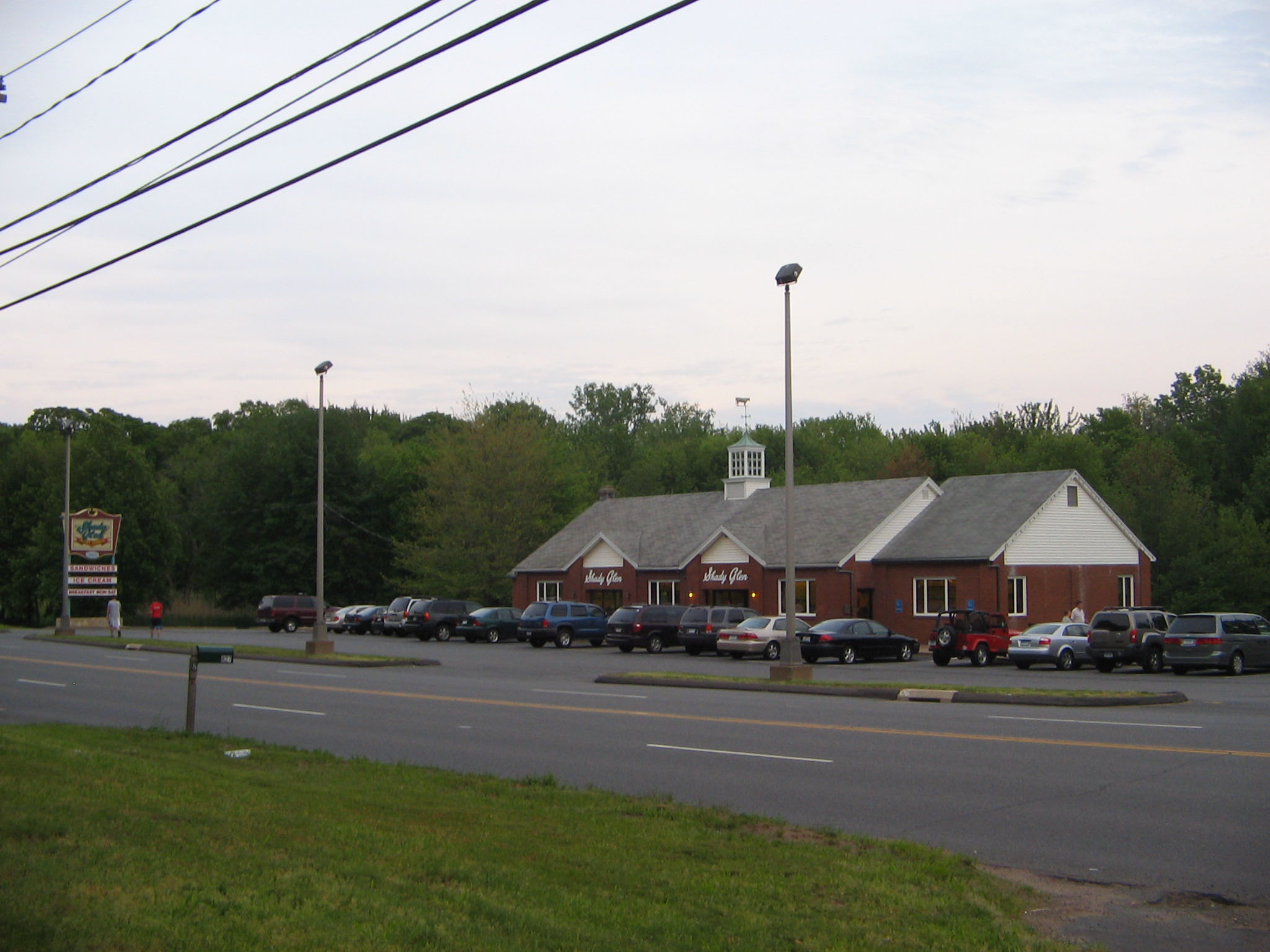
- The original location of Shady Glen on East Middle Turnpike
- Interactive map of Shady Glen

Restaurant information
- Established: June 12, 1948
- Food type: Diner
- Dress code: Casual
- Location: 840 East Middle Turnpike, Manchester, Connecticut, 06040, United States
- Reservations: None required, but be ready to wait on the weekends

Shady Glen, officially Shady Glen Dairy Stores, is a restaurant in Manchester, Connecticut. John and Bernice Rieg opened the first Shady Glen store near the Manchester/Bolton town line in 1948 and a second store in the Manchester Parkade shopping center in 1965. The second location closed in 2020 during the COVID-19 pandemic. Shady Glen is locally famous for its homemade-style ice cream, signature Bernice Original "winged" cheeseburger, and vintage 1950s style diner and service. In 2012, it was recognized by the James Beard Foundation as an "American Classic".

== History of Shady Glen Dairy Farm and Store ==
In 1946, John and Bernice Rieg decided to expand their farm into making and selling ice cream. The University of Connecticut at the time had a strong program for helping farmers to diversify, and the Riegs worked with Leonard R. Dowd, Professor of Dairy Manufacturing in UConn’s Department of Animal Industries, on their first formulas for ice cream.

Ice cream sold well during the summer months but to some extent ice cream sales are seasonal, and emphasis was therefore placed on developing a sandwich menu. After much experimenting, Bernice invented the “Bernice Original” cheeseburger in 1949. What makes the Bernice Original unique as far as cheeseburgers are concerned is the way the cheese is prepared and presented: it is fried directly on the grill until it has four crisp corners, or wings, and these protrude far out from under the top bun like a crown when the burger is served.

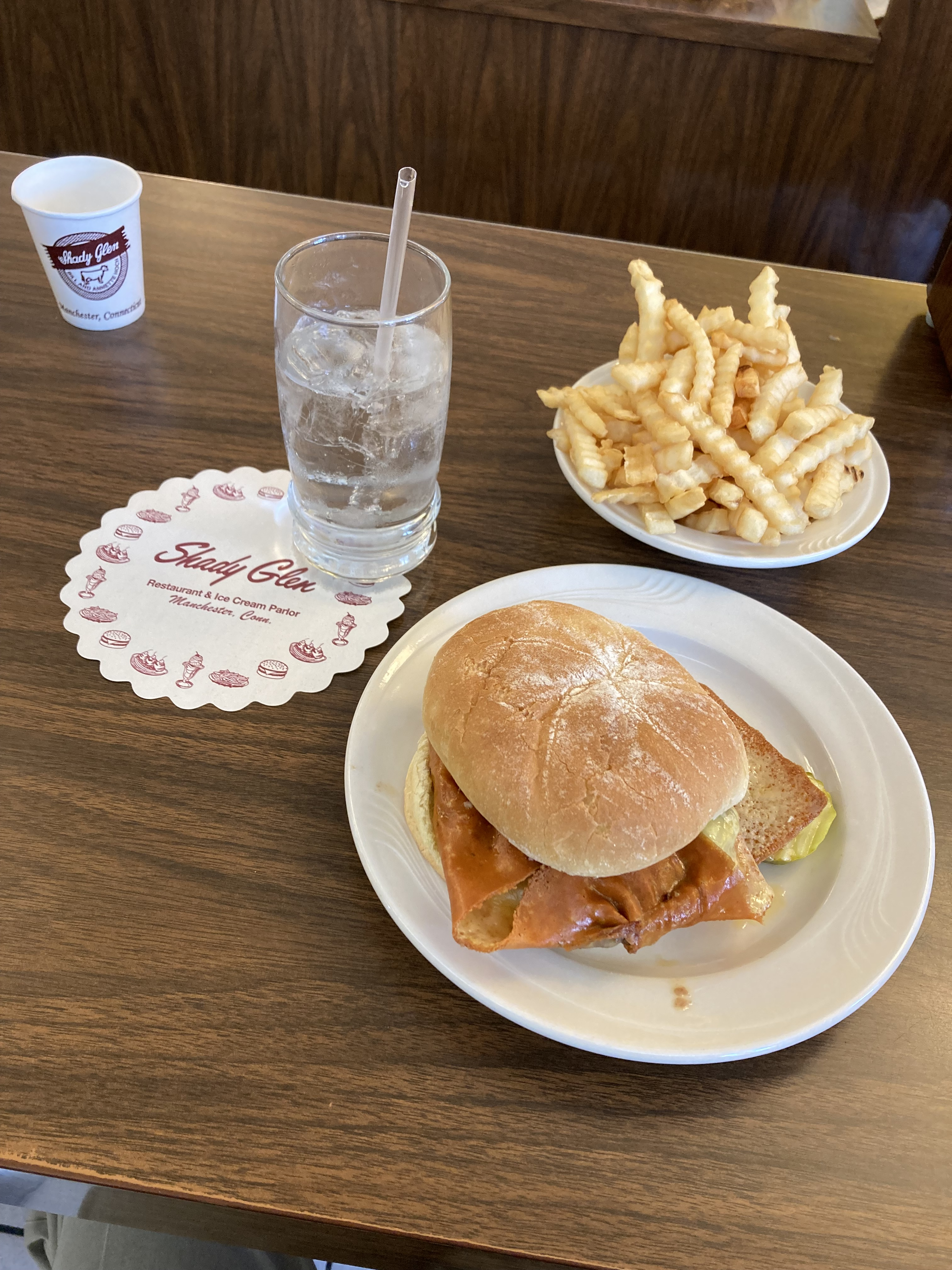
A meal, including the cheeseburger

The "Bernice Original" drew the attention of the Food Network's show The Best Thing I Ever Ate and was featured on their "Cheesy" episode, Season 2, Episode 3.

In early summer 2010, the Bernice Original—named "the best burger in Hartford County"—was accidentally altered due to what the owners of Shady Glen say is their cheese distributor's recipe having changed. Subsequently, the owners announced they had managed to acquire cheese in the proper formulation from a different distributor.

It was the example set by John and Bernice – their sincere concern for customer and employee alike – which induced William J. Hoch’s father to request work for his son, a cousin of the Riegs, in 1953. Starting at the age of 15, William paid his way through high school and college while working part-time at Shady Glen. In 1970 after 17 years with the company, he became Executive Manager in complete charge of operations.

John C. Rieg died on August 1, 2003, at the age of 89, and Bernice A. Rieg died on August 30, 2007, at the age of 91. Ownership passed on to Executive Manager William J. Hoch and his wife Annette after Bernice's death; William died on May 25, 2017. Shady Glen is now run by William Hoch's son.

== See also ==
- List of hamburger restaurants
