= La Taqueria =

Restaurant in San Francisco, California, United States

Coordinates: 37.7509°N 122.4181°W

- Interactive map of La Taqueria

Restaurant information
- Established: 1973
- Location: California, United States
- Website: https://lataqueriasf.net

La Taqueria is a restaurant in San Francisco, California. In 2017 it was named one of America's Classics by the James Beard Foundation.

== History ==
Owner Miguel Jara, who grew up in Tijuana, Mexico, immigrated to the United States in 1961. He missed the food from his home and decided to open a taqueria. He opened the restaurant in 1973, building the space out himself. At the time the designation "Mission-style" was not commonly used. According to Bon Appetit it is credited with creating the style.

The restaurant is located on Mission street between 24th and 25th, in San Francisco's Mission District. Jara's parents had helped him buy the building for US$39,000 in 1972; after they died without transferring ownership to him, the business was the subject of a property dispute between Jara and his eight siblings. A court ordered the building to be sold and the profits dispersed among the siblings, and in 2018 Jara and his sons purchased it for $1.7 million.

== Menu ==
The restaurant focuses on Mission-style burritos. Ingredients include meat, beans, cheese, and sauces. Pork for the carnitas are simmered in lard and then roasted. The recipes do not include rice, which is a common component in most Mission-style burritos. On request the rolled burritos are finished on the grill to brown them, which is known as dorado-style; the option is off-menu.

The restaurant also serves tacos and quesadillas.

== Recognition ==
In 2017 the restaurant was named one of America's Classics by the James Beard Foundation. In 2014 FiveThirtyEight named it the best burrito in the country. The San Francisco Chronicle called the restaurant "the Mission's most famous burrito spot".
