= Yuca's =

Restaurant in Los Angeles, California, U.S.

- Interactive map of Yuca's

Restaurant information
- Established: April 1, 1976
- Food type: Mexican
- Location: 2056 Hillhurst Avenue, Los Angeles, California, 90027, United States
- Coordinates: 34°6′32.9″N 118°17′14.3″W
- Website: yucasla.com

Yuca's is a restaurant in Los Angeles, California. The business was named one of "America's Classics" by the James Beard Foundation Awards.

== History ==
Founded in April 1976 by Socorro "Mama" Herrera, the original "hut" first opened in Los Feliz. A second location was later opened in Pasadena and is managed by her daughter, Dora.

== See also ==
- List of Mexican restaurants
