= Maison Marconi =

Defunct restaurant in Baltimore, Maryland, U.S.

- Interactive map of Maison Marconi

Restaurant information
- Closed: 2005
- Location: Baltimore, Maryland, United States
- Coordinates: 39.29309°N 76.61729°W

Maison Marconi was a restaurant in Baltimore, Maryland, in the United States. The business was named one of "America's Classics" by the James Beard Foundation Awards. It closed in 2005.
