= Mustache Bill's Diner =

Restaurant in Barnegat Light, New Jersey, U.S.

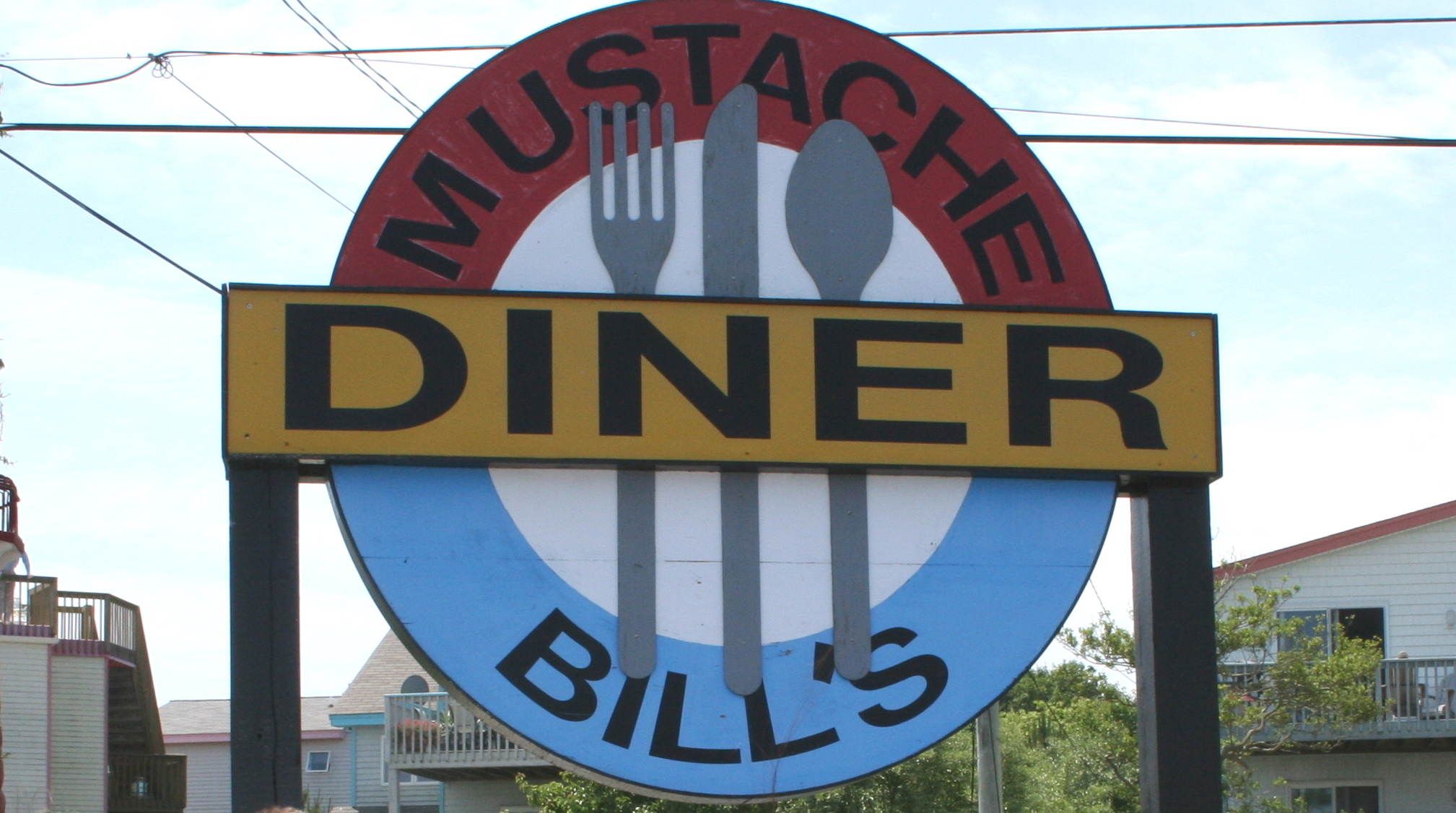
- The sign outside Mustache Bill's Diner
- Interactive map of Mustache Bill's Diner

Restaurant information
- Established: 1959
- Owner: Bill Smith
- Food type: Diner fare
- Location: W 8th Street, Barnegat Light, New Jersey, USA
- Coordinates: 39°45′30″N 74°06′26″W
- Website: Official website

Mustache Bill's Diner is a diner in Barnegat Light, New Jersey, established in 1959.

== History ==
The diner was opened in 1959 as Joe's Barnagat Light Diner, and offered free hamburgers and coffee between 2PM and 5PM. It has a 1950s style architectural design. The diner is named after Bill Smith, who began working at the diner as a busboy at age 12. He went on to cook at both Joe's and the Sunset Diner which was owned by his roommate's father. After graduating from high school in 1969, Smith bought the diner in 1972. Smith has been credited with coining the term "waitron", as a gender neutral term for a waiter or waitress.

It serves items such as sandwiches, pancakes, eggs, bacon and potatoes. It has a signature dish called "The Cyclops", which is a blueberry pancake with a fried egg in the center.

The restaurant received a James Beard American Classic Award in 2009. It was the first diner to receive the award. The restaurant was featured in the second season of Diners, Drive-Ins and Dives.

In 2023, Smith announced that he was retiring and the restaurant was put on sale for $3.65 million. According to Craig Laban of The Philadelphia Inquirer, the restaurant received hundreds of letters and tribute cards after the planned sale was announced.
