= A&A Bake & Doubles Shop =

Caribbean restaurant in Brooklyn, NY

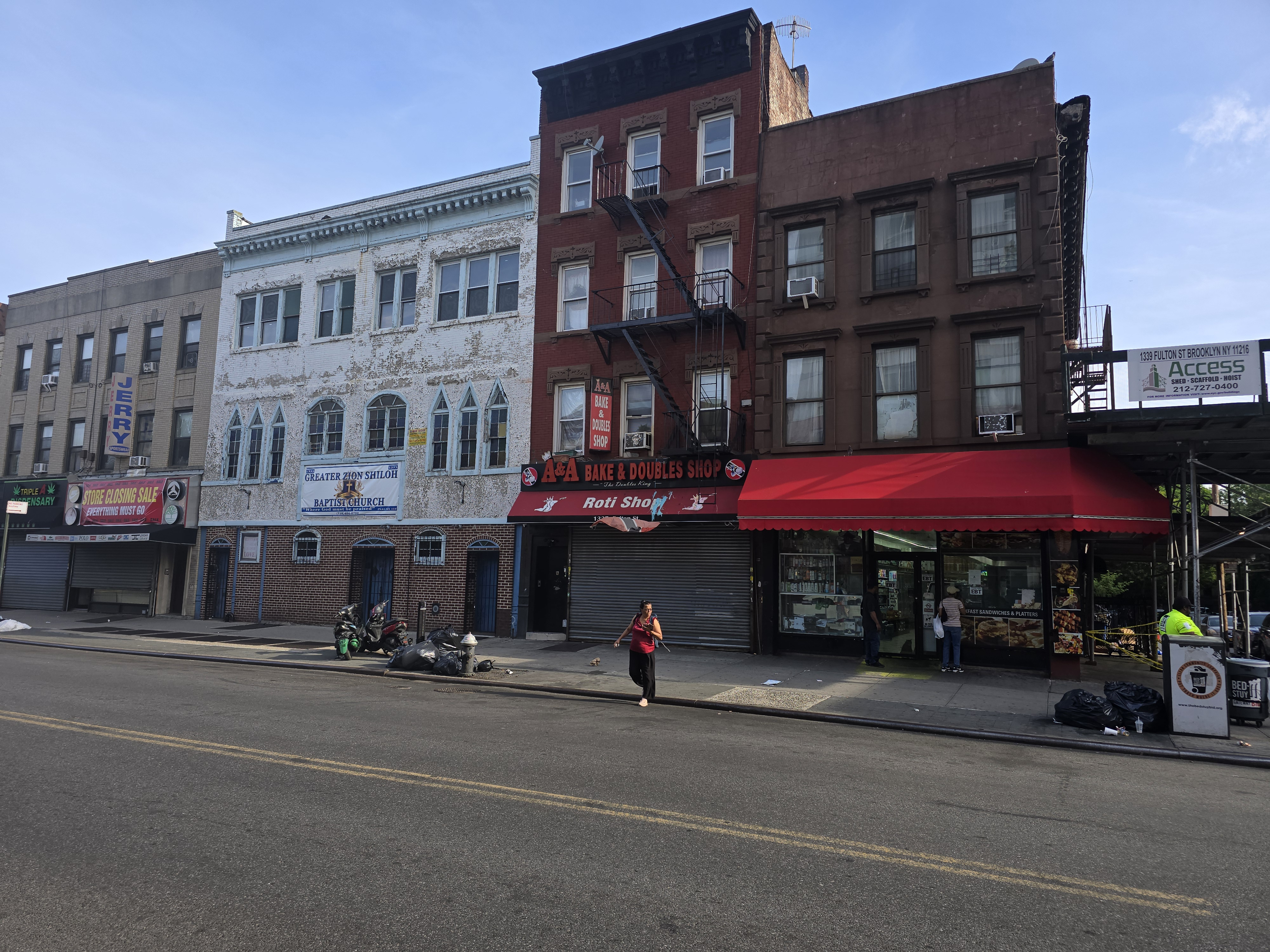
- Interactive map of A&A Bake & Doubles Shop

Restaurant information
- Location: 1337 Fulton Street, Brooklyn, New York, United States
- Coordinates: 40°40′49.8″N 73°56′52.6″W

A&A Bake & Doubles Shop is a Caribbean restaurant in Brooklyn, New York. Owned by Trinidadian immigrants Noel and Geeta Brown, it opened on Nostrand Avenue before moving around the corner to a bigger location on Fulton Street in Bedford-Stuyvesant.

The shop was reviewed by ex-Village Voice food critic Robert Sietsema in 2018. In 2019 it was one of the five winners of a James Beard Foundation's American Classics Award.
