= Drive XV: A Tribute to Automatic for the People =

Compilation album by Various Artists
- Released: 2007
- Genre: Indie rock, alternative rock
- Length: 49:53
- Language: English
- Label: Stereogum

Drive XV: A Tribute to Automatic for the People is a digital compilation released in 2007 by the website Stereogum.com to celebrate the 15th anniversary of R.E.M.'s multi-platinum album Automatic for the People.

== Track listing ==
All songs written by Bill Berry, Peter Buck, Mike Mills, and Michael Stipe.

1. "Drive" – 3:53 (The Veils)
2. "Try Not to Breathe" – 4:18 (Dappled Cities)
3. "The Sidewinder Sleeps Tonite" – 4:56 (Rogue Wave)
4. "Everybody Hurts" – 4:23 (Meat Puppets)
5. "New Orleans Instrumental No. 1" – 3:34 (Figurines)
6. "Sweetness Follows" – 3:36 (Sara Quin feat. Kaki King)
7. "Monty Got a Raw Deal" – 3:46 (Catfish Haven)
8. "Ignoreland" – 4:26 (The Forms)
9. "Star Me Kitten" – 2:43 (Blitzen Trapper)
10. "Man on the Moon" – 4:55 (Shout Out Louds)
11. "Nightswimming" – 4:28 (You Say Party! We Say Die!)
12. "Find the River" – 4:52 (Dr. Dog)

== See also ==
- Surprise Your Pig: A Tribute to R.E.M.
