= H&H =

H&H, H and H or HH may refer to:

== Companies ==
- H&H Bagels, a New York City bagel store
- H&H Classics, automobile auctioneers
- H&H Restaurant, a Macon, Georgia restaurant
- H&H Shooting Sports, an Oklahoma City shooting range
- Holland & Holland, gun maker
- Howe & Howe Technologies, vehicle fabrication

== Other ==
- The popular name of Boston's Handel and Haydn Society
- Hemoglobin and hematocrit, as a combination blood test
- .240 Holland & Holland Magnum, a centrefire rifle cartridge
