= List of soul food restaurants =

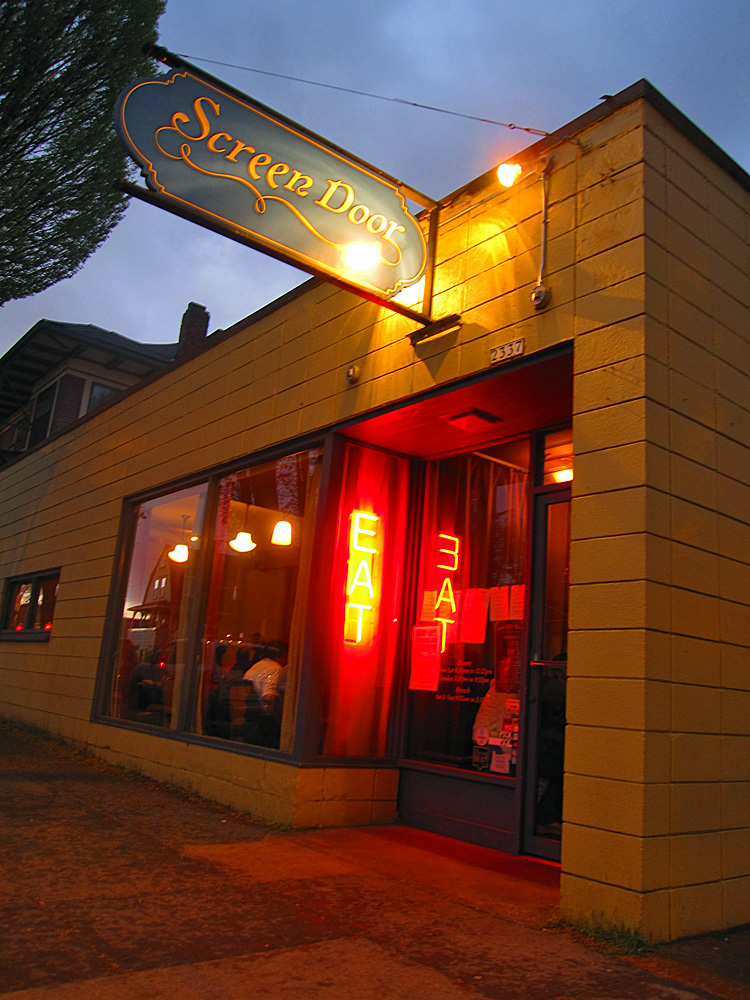
Screen Door, Portland, Oregon

Following is a list of notable soul food restaurants:

- Alta Adams, Los Angeles, California
- The Busy Bee Café, Atlanta, Georgia
- Charles' Southern Style Kitchen, New York City
- Communion Restaurant and Bar, Seattle, Washington
- Corinne's Place, Camden, New Jersey
- Delta Cafe, Portland, Oregon
- Dirty Lettuce, Portland, Oregon
- Erica's Soul Food, Portland, Oregon
- Everybody Eats PDX, Portland, Oregon
- Fair Deal Cafe, North Omaha, Nebraska
- Fat's Chicken and Waffles, Seattle
- H&H Restaurant, Macon, Georgia
- Jackson's Catfish Corner, Seattle
- JuneBaby, Seattle, Washington
- Kee's Loaded Kitchen, Portland, Oregon
- Mama Lo's, Gainesville, Florida
- Memphis Cafe, Costa Mesa, California
- Miss Delta, Portland, Oregon
- Reo's Ribs, Portland, Oregon
- Roscoe's House of Chicken 'N Waffles
- Screen Door, Portland, Oregon
- Souley Vegan, Oakland, California
- Sylvia's Restaurant of Harlem, New York City
- Wash's Restaurant, Atlantic City, New Jersey
- Weaver D's Delicious Fine Foods, Athens, Georgia
