= Charles' Southern Style Kitchen =

Restaurant in New York City, U.S.

Coordinates: 40°49′37.43″N 73°56′20.79″W

Charles' Country Pan Fried Chicken
- Headquarters: 2461 Frederick Douglass Blvd, New York, NY 10027, New York City, United States
- Key people: Charles Gabriel

Charles' Country Pan Fried Chicken, a.k.a. Charles' Southern Style Kitchen, is a soul food and Southern Food restaurant located at 2461 Frederick Douglass Blvd (between 131st & 132nd Streets), in Harlem in Manhattan, in New York City. It was featured on Al Roker's episode of My Life in Food.

== Background ==
Charles Gabriel was raised in the Southern United States along with his 20 siblings. He learned to cook from his mother and moved to New York cooking out of a food cart. He currently cooks the food at his restaurant and is a consulting chef at Rack & Soul.

When preparing his chicken, Charles fries it in a pan, repeatedly turning it and seasoning it in three stages. The venue has two addresses, one of which serves as the kitchen and one of which serves as the dining area. Magazine recipe writers have interviewed him and attempted to reproduce his techniques and recipes.

In 2013, Zagat gave it a food rating of 24, and a decor rating of 4.

== See also ==
- List of soul food restaurants
- List of Southern restaurants
