= Automatic for the People =

1992 album by R.E.M.

Studio album by R.E.M.
- Released: October 5, 1992
- Recorded: June 1991 – July 1992
- Studios: Bearsville, Woodstock; Criteria, Miami; John Keane, Athens; Kingsway, New Orleans; Bosstown, Atlanta
- Genres: Alternative rock; baroque pop; folk rock; chamber pop
- Length: 48:52
- Label: Warner Bros.
- Producers: Scott Litt; R.E.M.

R.E.M. chronology
The Best of R.E.M. (1991)	Automatic for the People (1992)	The Automatic Box (1993)

Singles from Automatic for the People
- 1. "Drive" Released: September 21, 1992; 2. "Man on the Moon" Released: November 9, 1992; 3. "The Sidewinder Sleeps Tonite" Released: February 1, 1993; 4. "Everybody Hurts" Released: April 5, 1993; 5. "Nightswimming" Released: July 12, 1993; 6. "Find the River" Released: November 29, 1993

Automatic for the People is the eighth studio album by the American alternative rock band R.E.M., released on October 5, 1992 in the United Kingdom and Europe, and on the following day in the United States, by Warner Bros. Records. R.E.M. began production on the album while their previous album, Out of Time (1991), was still ascending charts and achieving global success. Several tracks include strings arranged by John Paul Jones and conducted by George Hanson.

Yielding six singles, the album reached number two on the US Billboard 200 and received widespread acclaim from critics upon release. Rolling Stone reviewer Paul Evans concluded of the album, "This is the members of R.E.M. delving deeper than ever; grown sadder and wiser, the Athens subversives reveal a darker vision that shimmers with new, complex beauty." Automatic for the People has sold more than 18 million copies worldwide, and has been listed as one of the greatest albums of all time, with Rolling Stone ranking the album number 96 on its list of the "500 Greatest Albums of All Time" in 2020.

== Background and recording ==
What would become Automatic for the People had its origins in the mixing sessions for R.E.M.'s previous album Out of Time, held at Paisley Park Studios in December 1990. There, demos for "Drive", "Try Not to Breathe", and "Nightswimming" were recorded. After finishing promotional duties for Out of Time, the members of R.E.M. began formal work on their next album. Starting the first week of June 1991, guitarist Peter Buck, bassist Mike Mills, and drummer Bill Berry met several times a week in a rehearsal studio to work on new material. Once a month they would take a week-long break. The musicians would often trade instruments: Buck would play mandolin, Mills would play piano or organ, and Berry would play bass. Buck explained that writing without drums was productive for the band members. The band, intent on delivering an album of harder-rocking material after Out of Time, made an effort to write some faster rock songs during rehearsals, but came up with less than a half-dozen prospective songs in that vein.

The musicians recorded the demos in their standard band configuration. According to Buck, the musicians recorded about 30 songs. Lead singer Michael Stipe was not present at these sessions; instead, the band gave him the finished demos at the start of 1992. Stipe described the music to Rolling Stone early that year as "[v]ery mid-tempo, pretty fucking weird [...] More acoustic, more organ-based, less drums". In February, R.E.M. recorded another set of demos at Daniel Lanois's Kingsway Studios in New Orleans.

The group decided to create finished recordings with co-producer Scott Litt at Bearsville Studios in Woodstock, New York, starting on March 30. The band recorded overdubs in Miami and New York City. String arrangements were recorded in Atlanta. After recording sessions were completed in July, the album was mixed at Bad Animals Studio in Seattle. "The countermelody I sing on "Try Not to Breathe" is one of my favorites because everybody else left," Mills explained in 2023. "I'm in the studio and looking in the control room — I know there's something that's going to be good in this spot of the song. I try all these different things and I'm not finding it. And then I hit the right thing and I locked eyes with Scott McCaughey from 40 feet away. We just both knew that was the direction. It was very thrilling to have that moment." Seattle-based McCaughey spent time with the band while they were at Bad Animals Studio.

== Music and lyrics ==
Despite R.E.M.'s initial desire to make an album of rocking, guitar-dominated songs after Out of Time, music critic David Fricke noted that instead Automatic for the People "seems to move at an even more agonized crawl" than the band's previous release. Peter Buck took the lead in suggesting the new direction for the album. The album dealt with themes of loss and mourning inspired by "that sense of [...] turning 30", according to Buck. "The world that we'd been involved in had disappeared, the world of Hüsker Dü and The Replacements, all that had gone [...] We were just in a different place and that worked its way out musically and lyrically." "Sweetness Follows", "Drive", and "Monty Got a Raw Deal" in particular expressed much darker themes than any of the band's previous material and "Try Not to Breathe" is about Stipe's grandmother dying. "Monty Got A Raw Deal" is a song inspired by the life of actor Montgomery Clift. The song is unique for featuring Peter Buck playing bouzouki.

The songs "Drive", "The Sidewinder Sleeps Tonite", "Everybody Hurts", and "Nightswimming" feature string arrangements by former Led Zeppelin bassist John Paul Jones. Of the fourteen classical musicians, eleven were members of the Atlanta Symphony Orchestra, which had also been used on Out of Time. Fricke stated that "ballads, in fact, define the record", and noted that the album featured only three "rockers": "Ignoreland", "The Sidewinder Sleeps Tonite", and "Man on the Moon".

"It pretty much went according to plan," Litt reported. "Compared to Monster, it was a walk in the park. Out of Time had an orchestral arrangement—so, when we did Automatic, judging where Michael was going with the words, we wanted to scale it down and make it more intimate."

"Song by song [...] the whole album is referencing the 1970s," recalls Stipe. "Everybody Hurts" was inspired by Nazareth's cover of "Love Hurts". "Drive" was an homage to David Essex and "Rock On", especially that song's early glam rock production style.

== Packaging ==
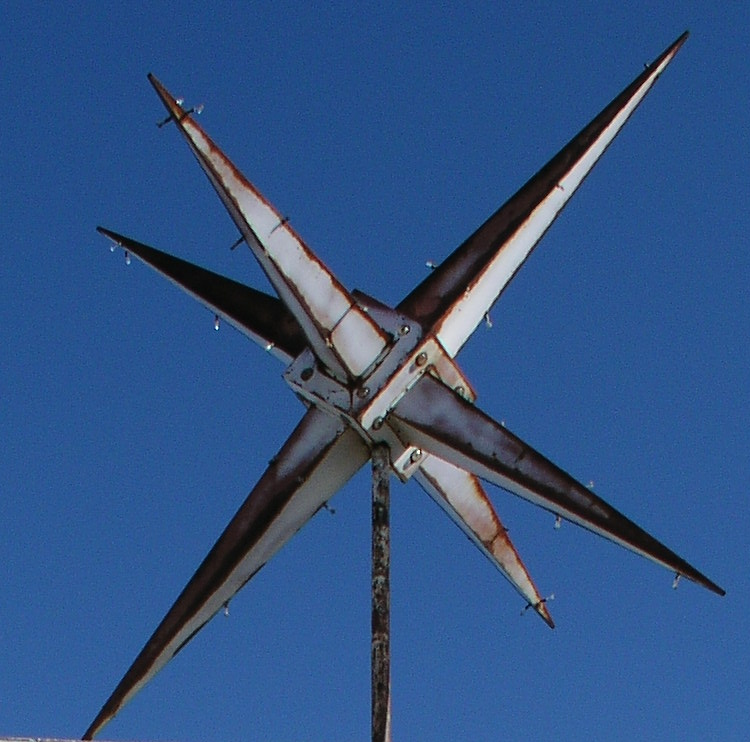
"Neo-Lectra" ornament in Vaughn, New Mexico, similar to the one in Miami that was photographed for the album's cover.

The album name refers to the motto of Athens, Georgia-based eatery Weaver D's Delicious Fine Foods. The photograph on the front cover is not related to the restaurant; rather, it shows a star ornament (a so-called "Neo-Lectra" or "Sputnik star" that was common in the 1960s) that was part of the sign for the Sinbad Motel on Biscayne Boulevard in Miami, near Criteria Studios, where the bulk of the album was recorded. The motel is still there, but the star has not been since it was damaged during Hurricane Andrew. The slanted support where it was once attached is still present. "The album was going to be called Star at one point, hence the object on the cover that Michael had photographed and really dug," Scott Litt told Mojo. "It helps to have some kind of focus in the studio, so the photo was stuck up." The star photograph is placed over an embossed image, which is also included inside the album's booklet, distorted on a white background.

The interior jacket shows a two- to three-story circular platform that was the sign for the old Bon Aire Motel on the former Motel Row on Miami Beach. The Bon Aire and other motel row establishments have mostly been demolished for new high-rise condominiums.

The back cover features a photograph of an old building with the track listing written over at the same angle from which the building is viewed. Other photographs, taken by Anton Corbijn, feature the band members on a beach and in the ocean.

The compact disc release was originally issued in a jewel case with a translucent yellow CD tray, traded out with a then-standard opaque black tray on later pressings; the cassette shell was also issued with the same color. The yellow was made to match the color of the CD. The band would later use a similar method for their 1994 album Monster, which was released with a metallic orange CD tray on early copies (though this matched the album cover).

== Release ==
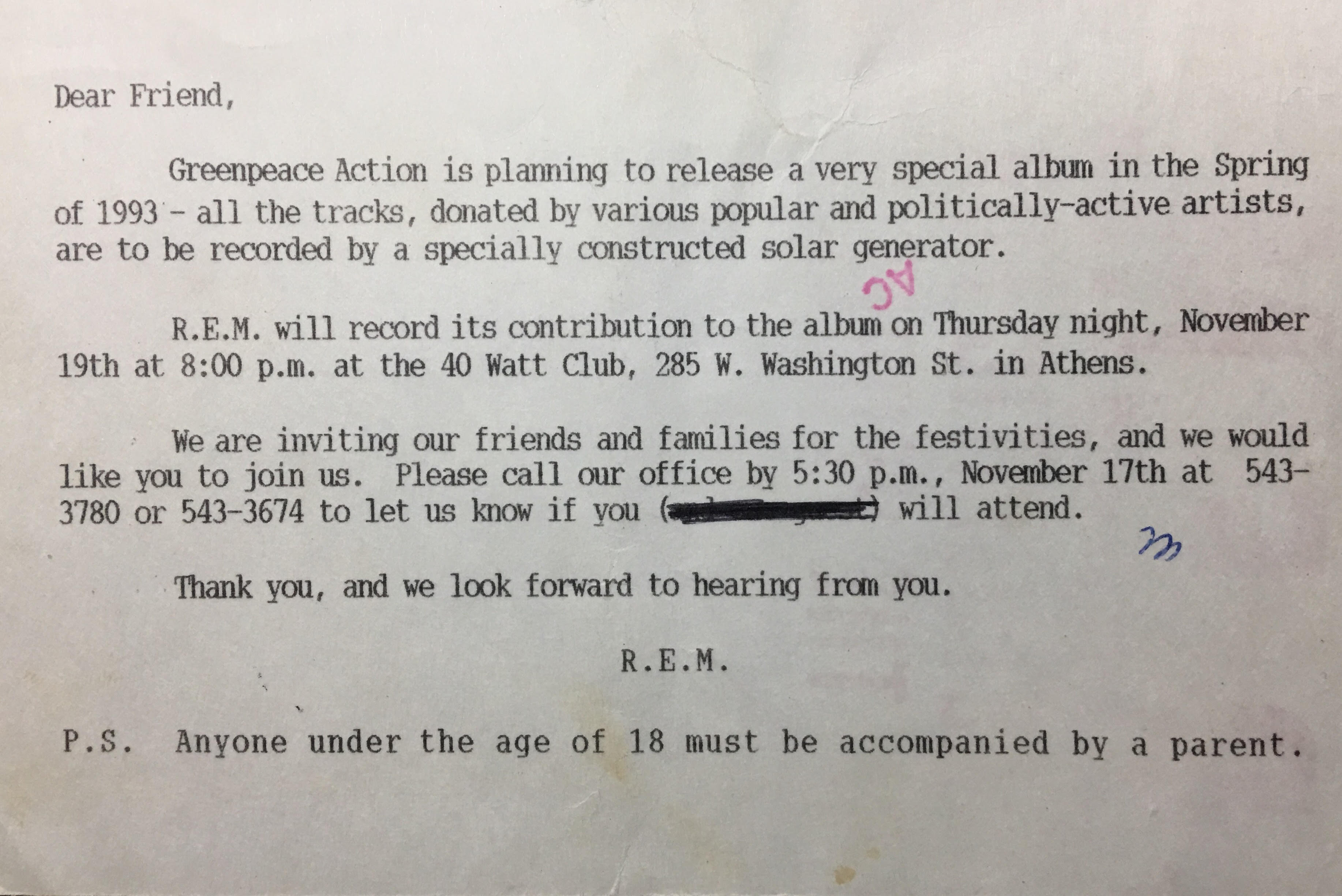
A live version of "Drive" recorded at this 11/19/1992 show appears on Alternative NRG.

Automatic for the People was released in October 1992. In the United States, the album reached No. 2 on the Billboard 200 album charts. The album reached No. 1 in the United Kingdom, where it topped the UK Albums Chart on four separate occasions. Despite only making a handful of promotional appearances and conducting a short mini-tour for Out of Time, R.E.M. drastically scaled back their live appearances even further for Automatic for the People, and did not do any tours whatsoever. Automatic for the People has been certified four times platinum in the US (four million copies shipped), six times platinum in the United Kingdom (1.8 million shipped), and three times platinum in Australia (210,000 shipped). The album has sold 3.52 million copies in the US, according to Nielsen SoundScan sales figures as of 2017. In 1993, the album has sold 1.7 million copies in the US, according to Billboard's lists of 1993's best-selling albums domestically.

Automatic for the People yielded six singles over the course of 1992 and 1993: "Drive", "Man on the Moon", "The Sidewinder Sleeps Tonite", "Everybody Hurts", "Nightswimming" and "Find the River". Lead single "Drive" was the album's highest-charting domestic hit, reaching No. 28 on the Billboard Hot 100. Other singles charted higher overseas: "Everybody Hurts" charted in the top ten on the United Kingdom singles chart, Canada, and Australia.

A live, harder, version of "Drive" appears on the Alternative NRG, recorded at Athens' 40 Watt Club on November 19, 1992, during an invitation-only concert supporting Greenpeace Action. A re-recorded, slower version of "Star Me Kitten", featuring William S. Burroughs, was released on Songs in the Key of X: Music from and Inspired by the X-Files in 1996.

The music videos from the album were included in the 1995 video release Parallel.

In 2005, Warner Bros. Records issued a two-disc edition of Automatic for the People which includes a CD, a DVD-Audio disc containing a 5.1-channel surround sound mix of the album done by Elliot Scheiner, and the original CD booklet with expanded liner notes.

A 25th anniversary edition was released on November 10, 2017, by Craft Recordings, featuring four discs of live recordings, demos, and the album remixed in Dolby Atmos, making Automatic for the People the first music release on this format.

== Critical reception and legacy ==
Professional ratings
Aggregate scores
Source	Rating
Metacritic	96/100
Review scores
Source	Rating
AllMusic	5/5 stars
Chicago Tribune	3.5/4 stars
Entertainment Weekly	A
The Independent	5/5 stars
Los Angeles Times	3.5/4 stars
NME	10/10
Pitchfork	9.3/10
Q	4/5 stars
Rolling Stone	5/5 stars
Select	5/5

The album received widespread acclaim from critics upon release. R.E.M. biographer David Buckley wrote, "Automatic for the People is regarded by Peter Buck and Mike Mills, and by most critics, as being the finest R.E.M. album ever recorded." Rolling Stone gave the album five stars. Reviewer Paul Evans wrote, "Despite its difficult concerns, most of Automatic is musically irresistible." Melody Maker reviewer Allan Jones commented, "It's almost impossible to write about the record without mentioning the recent grim rumours concerning Stipe's health", in reference to the rumors at the time that the singer was dying of AIDS or cancer. Jones concluded his review by noting, "Amazingly, initial reactions to Automatic for the People in this particular vicinity have been mixed. [...] Psshaw to them. Automatic for the People is R.E.M. at the very top of their form." Ann Powers, reviewing the album for The New York Times, noted that only three of the songs on the album went beyond mid-tempo and said, "Only 'Man on the Moon' shines with a wit that balances R.E.M.'s somber tendencies." Powers finished her review by saying, "Even in the midst of such disenchantment, R.E.M. can't resist its own talent for creating beautiful and moving sounds. [...] Buck, Mills and Berry can still conjure melodies that fall like summer sunlight. And Stipe still possesses a gorgeous voice that cannot shake its own gift for meaning." Guy Garcia, for Time, also noted the album's themes of "hopelessness, anger and loss". Garcia added that the album proves "that a so-called alternative band can keep its edge after conquering the musical mainstream" and that it "manages to dodge predictability without ever sounding aimless or unfocussed."

Automatic for the People placed third in the Village Voice Pazz & Jop year-end critics' poll. The Village Voice's Robert Christgau later gave the album a three-star honorable mention rating, indicating "an enjoyable effort consumers attuned to its overriding aesthetic or individual vision may well treasure." The album was nominated for Album of the Year at the Grammy Awards of 1994, but lost to Whitney Houston's The Bodyguard. In 2003, it was ranked number 247 in Rolling Stone's 500 Greatest Albums of All Time, 249 in a 2012 revised list, and 96 in a 2020 reboot of the list. Rolling Stone also ranked it at number 18 on its 100 Greatest Albums of the 90s list. It was also voted number 6 in Colin Larkin's All Time Top 1000 Albums 3rd Edition (2000). In 2006, British Hit Singles & Albums and NME organised a poll of which, 40,000 people worldwide voted for the 100 best albums ever and Automatic for the People was placed at number 37 on the list. The album was also included in the book 1001 Albums You Must Hear Before You Die.

"I'm not so crazy about 'The Sidewinder Sleeps Tonite'," Buck reflected in 2001, "but overall I think it sounds great." Buck added in 2003, in regard to the song, "We included this song on Automatic in order to break the prevailing mood of the album. Given that lyrically the record dealt with mortality, the passage of time, suicide and family, we felt that a light spot was needed. In retrospect, the consensus among the band is that this might be a little too lightweight."

According to the review aggregator Metacritic, the 25th anniversary re-release of Automatic for the People received "universal acclaim" based on a weighted average score of 96 out of 100 from 17 critic scores. In 2017, Pitchfork called Automatic for the People a "nakedly emotional album consumed by the anxiety of aging, the inevitability of death, the loss of innocence, and the impossibility of holding on to the past"; in 2022, they ranked this album the 63rd best of the 1990s. According to Tom Ewing of Freaky Trigger, R.E.M.'s achievement on Automatic for the People "was to wear their craft on their sleeve, making everything Michael Stipe sang sound both homespun and hard-won – a distillate of a decade making music and a lifetime hearing it."

== Track listing ==
=== Original release ===
All songs written by Bill Berry, Peter Buck, Mike Mills and Michael Stipe

Side one – "Drive side"

1. "Drive" – 4:31
2. "Try Not to Breathe" – 3:50
3. "The Sidewinder Sleeps Tonite" – 4:06
4. "Everybody Hurts" – 5:17
5. "New Orleans Instrumental No. 1" – 2:13
6. "Sweetness Follows" – 4:19

Side two – "Ride side"

1. "Monty Got a Raw Deal" – 3:17
2. "Ignoreland" – 4:24
3. "Star Me Kitten" – 3:15
4. "Man on the Moon" – 5:13
5. "Nightswimming" – 4:16
6. "Find the River" – 3:50

=== Note ===
- "The Sidewinder Sleeps Tonite" contains an interpolation of "The Lion Sleeps Tonight".

== Personnel ==
R.E.M.

- Bill Berry – drums, percussion, backing vocals, melodica on "Find the River", electric piano on "New Orleans Instrumental No. 1"
- Peter Buck – electric and acoustic guitars, mandolin, dulcimer on "Try Not to Breathe", bouzouki on "Monty Got a Raw Deal"
- Mike Mills – bass guitar, backing vocals, organ, accordion, piano, double bass on "New Orleans Instrumental No. 1", fuzz bass on "Ignoreland", acoustic guitar on "Find the River"
- Michael Stipe – lead vocals

Additional musicians

- Scott Litt – harmonica and clavinet on "Ignoreland"
- Knox Chandler – cello on "Sweetness Follows" and "Monty Got A Raw Deal"
- Deborah Workman – oboe on "Nightswimming"

String section on "Drive", "The Sidewinder Sleeps Tonite", "Everybody Hurts", and "Nightswimming"

- John Paul Jones – orchestral arrangements
- George Hanson – conductor
- Denise Berginson-Smith, Lonnie Ottzen, Patti Gouvas, Sandy Salzinger, Sou-Chun Su, Jody Taylor – violin
- Kathleen Kee, Daniel Laufer, Elizabeth Proctor Murphy – cello
- Reid Harris, Paul Murphy, Heidi Nitchie – viola

Production

- Scott Litt – producer, mixing engineer
- R.E.M. – producers
- Clif Norrell – recording engineer, mixing engineer
- Stephen Marcussen – mastering engineer (Precision Mastering)
- Ed Brooks – second engineer (Seattle)
- George Cowan – second engineer (Bearsville)
- Adrian Hernandez – second assistant engineer (Hollywood)
- John Keane – recording engineer (Athens)
- Mark Howard – second engineer (New Orleans)
- Tod Lemkuhl – second engineer (Seattle)
- Ted Malia – second engineer (Atlanta)
- Andrew Roshberg – second engineer (Miami)

Artwork

- Anton Corbijn – photographs
- Tom Recchion – art direction, design
- Michael Stipe – art direction, design
- Fredrik Nilsen – back cover photos
- Cecil Juanarena – computer imaging

== Charts ==
=== Weekly charts ===
Chart (1992–95)	Peak position
Australian Albums (ARIA)	2
Austrian Albums (Ö3 Austria)	3
Canada Top Albums/CDs (RPM)	4
Dutch Albums (Album Top 100)	2
German Albums (Offizielle Top 100)	2
Hungarian Albums (MAHASZ)	38
Japanese Albums (Oricon)	27
New Zealand Albums (RMNZ)	1
Norwegian Albums (VG-lista)	4
Spanish Albums (PROMUSICAE)	6
Swedish Albums (Sverigetopplistan)	7
Swiss Albums (Schweizer Hitparade)	3
UK Albums (Official Charts)	1
US Billboard 200	2
Chart (2000–01)	Peak position
Dutch Albums (Album Top 100)	27
French Albums (SNEP)	135
Norwegian Albums (VG-lista)	7
UK Albums (Official Charts)	15
Chart (2017–21)	Peak position
Austrian Albums (Ö3 Austria)	47
Belgian Albums (Ultratop Flanders)	105
Dutch Albums (Album Top 100)	94
German Albums (Offizielle Top 100)	23
Italian Albums (FIMI)	75
Spanish Albums (Promusicae)	93
Swiss Albums (Schweizer Hitparade)	87
UK Albums (Official Charts)	48
US Billboard 200	118
US Top Alternative Albums (Billboard)	8
US Top Rock Albums (Billboard)	16
US Vinyl Albums (Billboard)	7

=== Year-end charts ===
Chart (1992)	Position
Dutch Albums (Album Top 100)	81
New Zealand Albums (RMNZ)	31
UK Albums (OCC)	18
US Billboard 200	83
Chart (1993)	Position
Australian Albums (ARIA)	22
Austrian Albums (Ö3 Austria)	11
Canada Top Albums/CDs (RPM)	26
Dutch Albums (Album Top 100)	17
New Zealand Albums (RMNZ)	5
Spanish Albums (AFYVE)	43
Swiss Albums (Schweizer Hitparade)	13
UK Albums (OCC)	2
US Billboard 200	27
Chart (1994)	Position
Dutch Albums (Album Top 100)	70
Chart (2021)	Position
Belgian Albums (Ultratop Flanders)	194

== Certifications and sales ==
Region	Certification	Certified units/sales
Argentina (CAPIF)	Gold	30,000^{^}
Australia (ARIA)	4× Platinum	280,000^{^}
Austria (IFPI Austria)	2× Platinum	100,000^{*}
Canada (Music Canada)	7× Platinum	700,000^{^}
Denmark (IFPI Danmark)	4× Platinum	80,000^{‡}
France (SNEP)	Platinum	300,000^{*}
Germany (BVMI)	5× Gold	1,250,000^{^}
Italy (FIMI) sales since 2009	Gold	25,000^{‡}
Netherlands (NVPI)	3× Platinum	300,000^{^}
New Zealand (RMNZ)	Platinum	15,000^{^}
Spain (Promusicae)	2× Platinum	200,000^{^}
Sweden (GLF)	2× Platinum	200,000^{^}
Switzerland (IFPI Switzerland)	2× Platinum	100,000^{^}
United Kingdom (BPI)	8× Platinum	2,400,000^{‡}
United States (RIAA)	4× Platinum	3,520,000
Summaries
Worldwide	—	18,000,000
^{*} Sales figures based on certification alone.^{^} Shipments figures based on certification alone.^{‡} Sales+streaming figures based on certification alone.

== See also ==
- Drive XV: A Tribute to Automatic for the People
