= Lisa Garcia Quiroz =

- Born: January 10, 1961
- Died: March 16, 2018 (aged 57); Denver, Colorado
- Education: Harvard, B.A. Harvard Business School M.B.A. 1990
- Occupation: Media executive
- Years active: 23 years
- Employer: Time Warner
- Spouse: Guy Garcia
- Awards: Crain's NY Business 100 Most Powerful Minority Business Leaders; Hispanic Heritage Award 2002; Hispanic Scholarship Alumni Hall of Fame

Lisa Garcia Quiroz (January 10, 1961 – March 16, 2018) was an American business executive at Time Warner who oversaw its charitable foundation and philanthropic activity and corporate responsibility departments. She served as the media enterprise's first chief diversity officer and founder of the content incubator OneFifty. Quiroz also served as president of the Time Warner Foundation.

Quiroz created and launched Time Inc.'s People en Español, recognized by Adweek Magazine in 2001 and 2002 for circulation growth. She also created and launched a spin-off publication of Time Magazine, entitled Time for Kids, a magazine geared to children in classrooms which achieved a circulation of over 3.5 million. She served on a number of nonprofit boards including the Public Theater, the Corporation for National and Community Service and the Hispanic Scholarship Fund. She was nominated by American president Barack Obama in 2010 to serve as a director for the Corporation for National and Community Service and was appointed by New York City mayor Michael Bloomberg to serve on the city's Commission on Human Rights. In 2016, she was named one of Black Enterprise's Top Executives in Corporate Diversity.

== Personal life ==
Quiroz graduated from Harvard University and Harvard Business School with a Masters in Business Administration. In 2010, Quiroz married author Guy Garcia. She was of Mexican and Puerto Rican ancestry. She died on March 16, 2018, at the age of 57 from pancreatic cancer.
