= Screen door (disambiguation) =

Screen door may refer to:

- screen door, a type of door
- Screen Door, a Canadian independent production company
- Screen Door (restaurant), a Southern and soul food restaurant in Portland, Oregon
- Screen door effect, a fixed-pattern noise (FPN) or a visual artifact of certain digital video projectors and CRT televisions
- Platform screen doors in rail stations
