= Souley =

Souley is a name from Niger.

== People with the given name ==
- Souley Abdoulaye (1956–2023), Nigerien politician
- Souley Boum (born 1999), American college basketball player
- Souley Doukara (born 1991), French footballer

== People with the surname ==
- Hamadou Souley, Interior Minister of Niger
- Mariama Souley Bana (born 1987), Nigerien swimmer
- Zalika Souley (1947–2021), Nigerien actress

== See also ==
- Souley Vegan, American restaurant group
