= The New Mainstream =

2004 book by Guy Garcia

- Author: Guy Garcia
- Language: English
- Genre: Non-fiction
- Publisher: HarperCollins
- Publication date: 2004
- Publication place: United States

The New Mainstream is a book published in 2004 by HarperCollins and a phrase coined by author and journalist Guy Garcia describing the psycho-economic and social transformation driven by growing populations of Hispanics, African Americans, Asians, and other intercultural groups who merge and influence how Americans live, work, and buy.

== Book ==
The New Mainstream argues that diversity and cultural exchange in an expanding and evolving U.S. population is a driving force of modern American and global capitalism. The book examines how consumer buying power transforms the way products are developed, marketed, and bought. It also explores how an increasingly transcultural global society influences the taste and habits of a "creative class" of non-Hispanic whites, European immigrants and others. The New Mainstream challenges the linear mono-directional "Melting Pot" model of acculturation, explaining that the process between the social core and periphery is mutually transformational, and describes new opportunities and business strategies to appeal to modern America’s intercultural consumer population. Publishers Weekly recognized author Guy Garcia for "mobilizing an impressively broad knowledge of cultures—popular, folk and high—and a lively sense of history." Said Richard Parsons, former chairman and CEO of Time Warner Inc.: "As well as an engaging and enlightening book, The New Mainstream is an important one."

== Concept ==
The New Mainstream refers to evolving U.S. consumer markets and the way Hispanics and other diverse groups have expanded the definition of American identity. It recognizes a "new mainstream" majority of ethnically and racially diverse Americans who do not compromise their cultural identity while becoming acculturated to traditional American values. As this population achieves greater levels of buying power, businesses must evolve to meet the demands of the changing social and economic landscape. With roughly $5 trillion in spending power, new mainstream consumers have access to more choices and businesses have an increasing incentive to study and respond to their attributes and key behaviors.

New culture dynamics create challenges related to defining consumers, sampling designs, and analytic strategy.

=== An Emerging Minority-Majority ===
The unprecedented increase of ethnically and racially diverse American populations is central to this phenomenon. In 2014, Hispanics, African Americans, Asians and other immigrant groups were a growing part of America’s consumer base while traditional segments of the marketplace shrank. In March 2014, 88% of the country's population growth was attributed to Hispanic, African American, and Asian Consumers. This shift invited businesses to reconstruct their marketing and advertising efforts and gain a new understanding of new mainstream consumer bases.

=== Technology and The New Mainstream ===
Ambicultural Hispanics and other "new mainstream" populations interact with media at an unprecedented rate. New communication technologies allow conversation with relatives and friends that preserve connections to cultural roots. New media also serves as a platform for cross-cultural communication and self-expression. These social viewers merge and understand various cultural inputs and languages in a fluid, contextual way and are thus more likely to appreciate interactive meshing of social and traditional media.

== Reception ==
The New Mainstream's author Guy Garcia is regularly featured as a commentator and trend tracker on PBS and NPR. New mainstream terminology and concepts have been adopted and adapted by various corporations, including Telemundo/NBCUniversal, and research institutions, including EthniFacts (where Garcia is a partner and President of New Mainstream initiatives) and Geoscape, providers of business intelligence technology, data and analytics.
