= Alta Adams =

Restaurant in Los Angeles, California, U.S.

- Interactive map of Alta Adams

Restaurant information
- Food type: Southern
- Location: 5359 W Adams Blvd., Los Angeles, California, 90016, United States
- Coordinates: 34°1′58″N 118°21′36″W
- Website: altaadams.com

Alta Adams is a Southern restaurant in Los Angeles, California, United States. Keith Corbin and Daniel Patterson are chefs. The menu includes "California soul food" such as black-eyed pea fritters, miso-infused oxtails, shrimp and grits, and cocktails.

== See also ==
- List of soul food restaurants
- List of Southern restaurants
