= Corinne's Place =

Restaurant in Camden, New Jersey, US

- Interactive map of Corinne's Place

Restaurant information
- Established: 1989
- Location: 1254 Haddon Avenue, Camden, New Jersey, 08103, United States
- Coordinates: 39.9315°N 75.1016°W
- Website: corinnesplace.com

Corinne's Place is a soul food restaurant in Camden, New Jersey. In 2022 the restaurant was selected as an America's Classic by the James Beard Foundation.

== History ==
Corinne Bradley-Powers, a Camden native and lifelong resident and at the time a single mother, founded the restaurant on Haddon Avenue in Camden in 1989. Before starting the business, she was a social worker. She bought the property in 1985, but struggled to get a loan, and took on a catering job to fund the business. At first, the restaurant was open only on weekends. By 1995, it was open Wednesday through Saturday, with an all-day buffet on Sundays. Bradley-Powers was often joined in the kitchen by her mother, Fannie Anderson, who had taught her how to cook, while her own daughter worked as a waitress. At the time, she advertised the restaurant as "soul food with a touch of class".

In 2008, Corinne's Place was featured in a Gannett New Jersey article, which called it "a treasured part of Camden's community", noting that regulars often called on Bradley-Powers for catering weddings and other events.

When the James Beard foundation announced the 2022 America's Classics list, friends texted Bradley-Powers to congratulate her; she had never heard of the foundation or its namesake.

== Menu ==
The restaurant focuses on southern specialties such as fried chicken, pigs feet, smothered pork chops, turkey wings, fried catfish, black-eyed peas, greens, cornbread, and sweet potatoes. Philadelphia Inquirer dining editor Craig LaBan called Bradley-Powers “the queen of soul food” the restaurant's fried chicken “unforgettable.”

== Recognition ==
In 2022 the restaurant was selected as an America's Classic by the James Beard Foundation; the foundation in their announcement called the restaurant "a pillar of community at the heart of one of America’s lowest-income cities". NBC News in 2020 called the restaurant "acclaimed". Local and regional media have called the restaurant "iconic" and Bradley-Powers a pillar of her community.

== Ownership ==
Bradley-Powers sold the restaurant to Trevor Vaughan in 2019 and maintains a consulting role.

== See also ==
- List of soul food restaurants
- List of Southern restaurants
