= Erica's Soul Food =

Restaurant in Portland, Oregon, U.S.

- Interactive map of Erica's Soul Food

Restaurant information
- Established: January 2020
- Owner: Erica Montgomery
- Chef: Erica Montgomery
- Food type: Southern; soul food
- Location: Portland, Oregon, United States
- Coordinates: 45°31′30.49″N 122°38′42.95″W

Erica's Soul Food is a restaurant in Portland, Oregon.

== Description ==
Erica's Soul Food is a Black-owned restaurant serving Southern cuisine and soul food. The menu includes catfish, Atlanta-style chicken wings, meatloaf, and salmon croquettes with sweet onion. Wings have various sauces such as jerk, maple barbecue, and peach sriracha, and are served with blue cheese or ranch dressing. Sides include black-eyed peas, cabbage, collard greens, cornbread, French fries, macaroni and cheese, boiled peanuts, sautéed squash, and tater tots. The restaurant also serves pound cake with White Lily flour. Erica's served pumpkin spice wings in 2021.

== History ==
Erica's Soul Food was founded by chef Erica Montgomery, who began operating the business from a food cart in southeast Portland in January 2020. In 2021, during the COVID-19 pandemic, she made vaccine appointments for patrons who were interested in receiving one. The cart closed for the August 2021 heat wave.

== Reception ==
In 2021, Jordan Michelman of Portland Monthly said Erica's had the city's best chicken wings, writing, "As carts rise again as hubs of culinary innovation with cultish fanbases, Erica's has emerged as one of the most exciting new kitchens to open in Portland in the past year and a half—not just for its food, but for its community impact. Call your wing-loving friends. Make yours a double order. Wings this good are a gift. Enjoy and be thankful." The magazine's Katherine Chew Hamilton and Karen Brooks included Erica's in a list of the city's best new food carts. Similarly, Michael Russell of The Oregonian included Erica's in a list of the city's best new food carts of 2021, saying the restaurant "makes some of the best soul food in the city, period". He said the menu "rewards exploration" and recommended the meatloaf, macaroni and cheese, greens, and red velvet cake.

The Portland Mercury's Suzette Smith said Erica's offers "damn fine" Southern food and "might make the best tater tot in Portland" in 2021. Erica's ranked in the top ten on Yelp for restaurants with the best macaroni and cheese, as of mid 2021. Nick Woo and Brooke Jackson-Glidden included Erica's in Eater Portland's 2021 "guide to Portland's most outstanding food carts". The website's Ron Scott and Nathan Williams included the restaurant in a 2022 list of "13 Spots for Serious Soul Food in Portland and Beyond". Erica's was also included in the website's 2025 overview of Portland's best food carts.

== See also ==
- List of Black-owned restaurants
- List of soul food restaurants
- List of Southern restaurants
