= Mama Lo's =

Restaurant in Gainesville, Florida, United States

Coordinates: 29.657190°N 82.331026°W

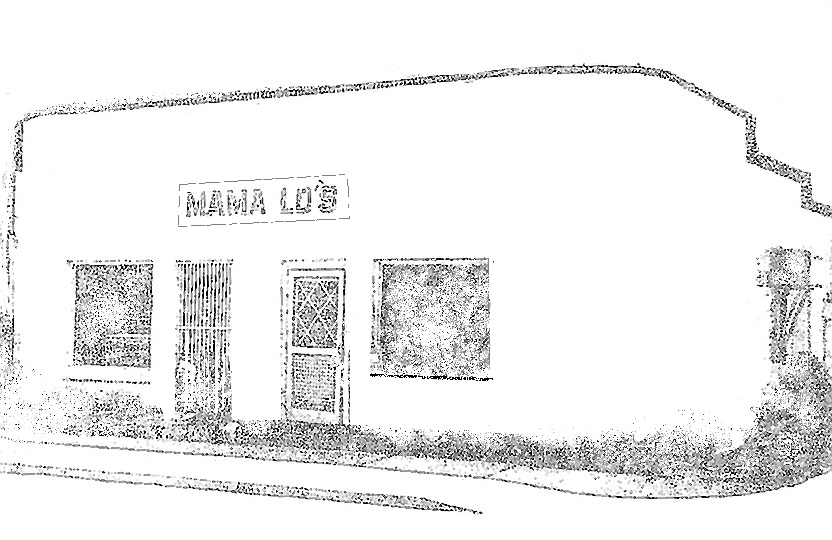
Representation of Mama Lo's restaurant

Mama Lo's was a soul food restaurant located in Gainesville, Florida, United States. It was founded by, operated by, and named for Lorene "Mama Lo" Alexander in 1975. It was known to be popular, and said to serve more than 200 customers for the lunch hour and more than that at dinner. It served large portions for a cheap price. The restaurant closed in 1995. Located only a few blocks from the University of Florida and across the street from a railroad track, the establishment proved popular with students, townsfolk and travelers alike. It was also frequented by many local musicians such as Bo Diddley, Tom Petty and the Heartbreakers, The Stranger Band and Sister Hazel.

UF alumni in the 2000s reminisced about their favorite Mama Lo's servings, such as chicken and rice, broccoli casserole, and sweet tea. It was said that through the Southern, home-style cooking Mama Lo served to loyal customers for over three decades, she put her four children through college in Gainesville.

Mama Lo's was located at 618 NW 6th Street in Gainesville, Florida. Lorene "Mama Lo" Alexander died in 2007, at the age of 85.

== See also ==
- List of soul food restaurants
