= The Busy Bee Café =

Restaurant in Atlanta, Georgia, U.S.

Coordinates: 33.7544°N 84.4140°W

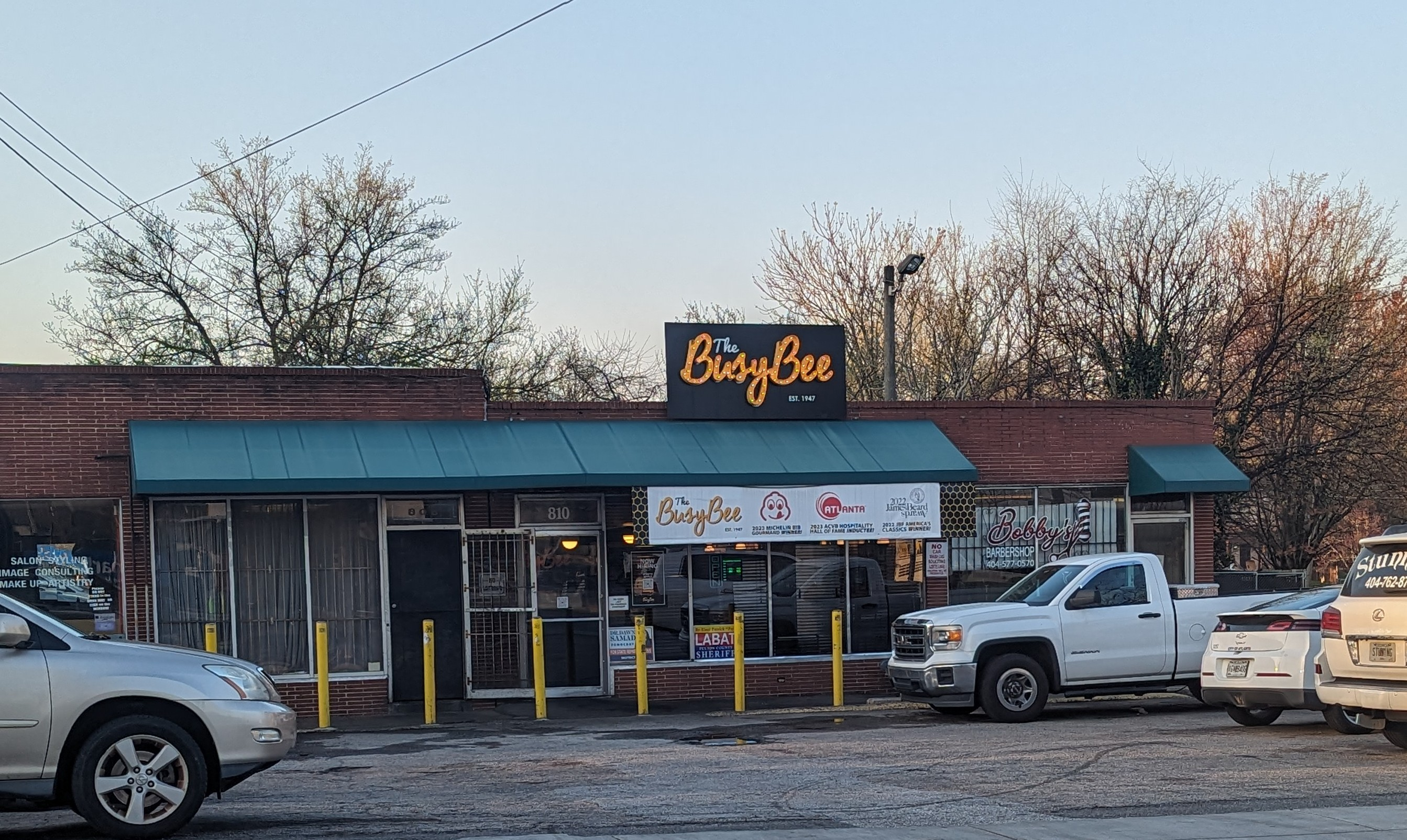
- Front entrance of the Busy Bee Café
- Interactive map of The Busy Bee Café

The Busy Bee Café is a restaurant in Atlanta, Georgia, United States. It is a well-known location in the history of the U.S. civil rights movement. In 2022 it was named one of America's Classics by the James Beard Foundation.

== Description ==
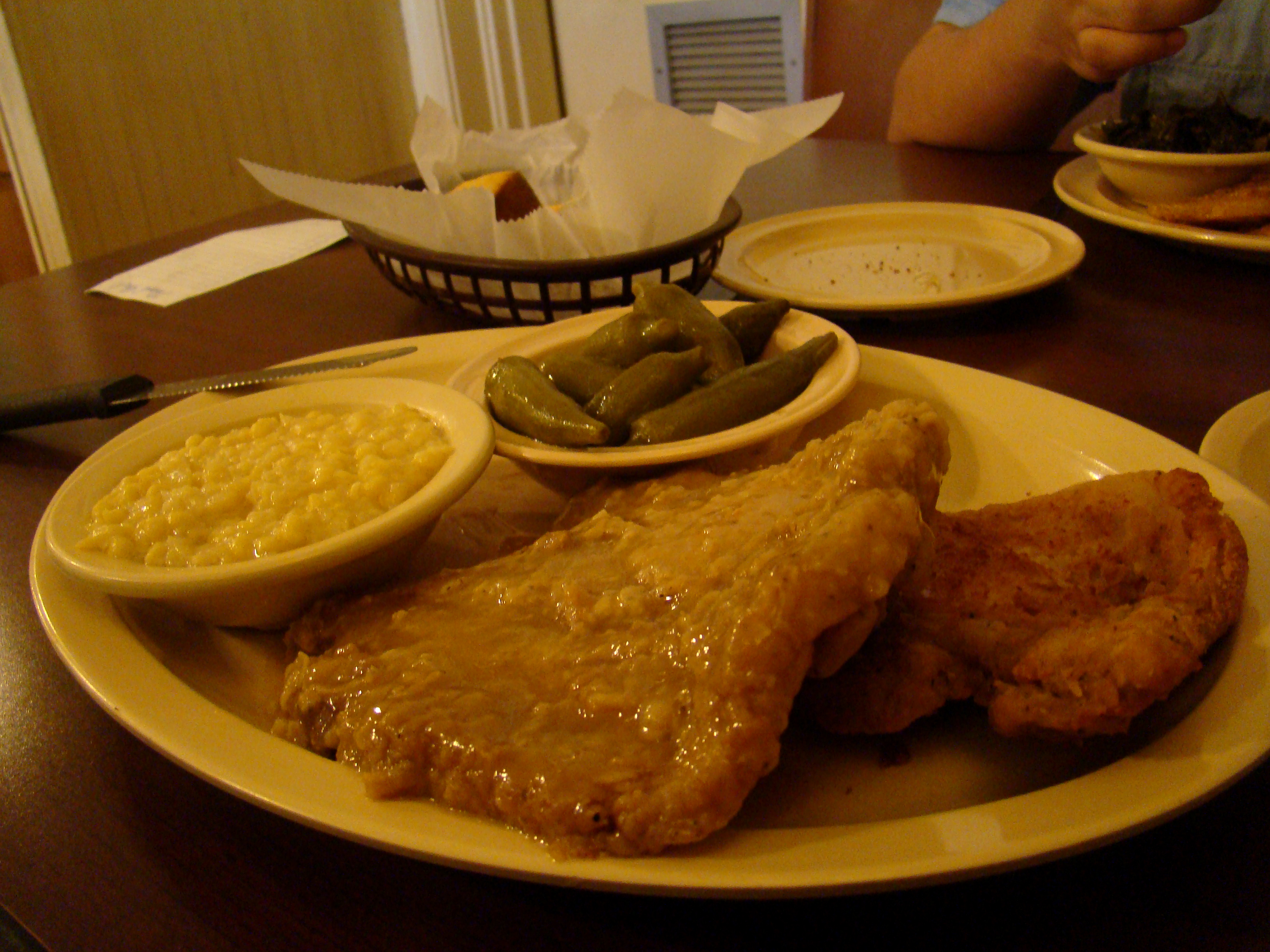
Smothered fried porkchop, fried corn, and okra at the Busy Bee Cafe

The restaurant specializes in southern and soul food specialties such as catfish, fried chicken, ham hocks, macaroni and cheese, collard greens, and cornbread. Country Living said it was best known for its fried chicken.

== History ==
The restaurant was opened by Lucy Jackson, a self-taught cook from Carrollton, Georgia, in 1947 on what was at the time called Hunter Street, now Martin Luther King Drive. At that time Hunter Street was one of only two streets in Atlanta where Black entrepreneurs were allowed to open businesses and where Black diners were welcome in restaurants.

The Busy Bee and Paschal's became meeting places for civil rights leaders such as Martin Luther King Jr. and Hosea Williams. According to Unique Eats and Eateries of Atlanta, the restaurant is "as well known for its role in the civil rights movement as it is for its fried chicken."

In 1968 Jackson sold the restaurant to two local businessmen. In 1981 Milton Gates bought it.

As of 2022 the restaurant is owned by Tracy Gates, who took over from her father in 1987.

== Reception ==
In 2022 the restaurant was named one of America's Classics by the James Beard Foundation. Roadfood called them "the best Southern restaurant in Atlanta. Period."

== See also ==
- List of Michelin Bib Gourmand restaurants in the United States
- List of soul food restaurants
- List of Southern restaurants
