= Roscoe's House of Chicken 'N Waffles =

American soul food restaurant chain

- Type: Private
- Industry: Casual dining restaurant
- Founded: Long Beach, California (1975; 51 years ago)
- Founder: Herb Hudson
- Headquarters: United States
- Number of locations: 7
- Area served: Los Angeles metropolitan area
- Website: roscoeschickenandwaffles.com

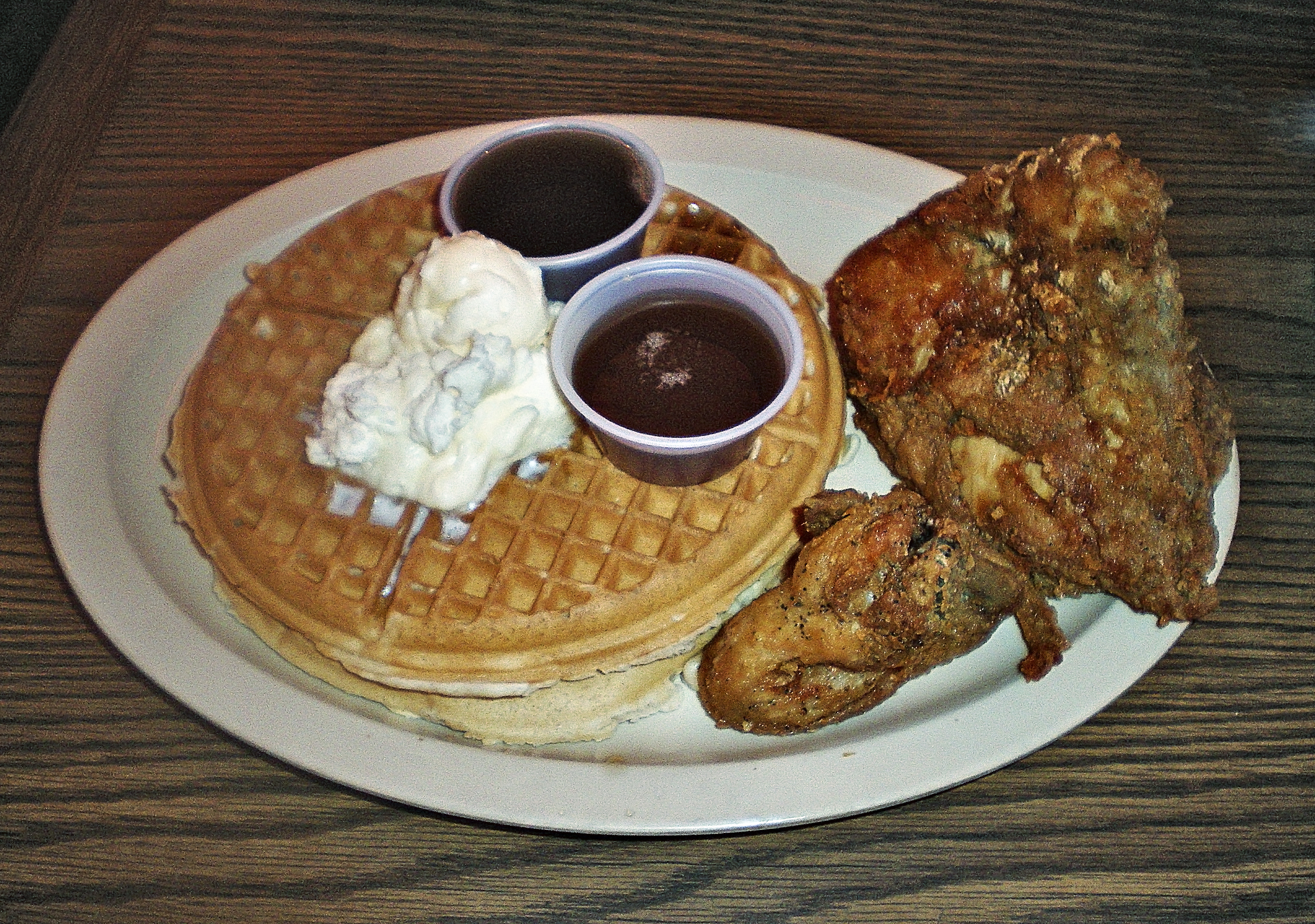
Roscoe's chicken and waffles

Roscoe's House of Chicken 'N Waffles is an American soul food restaurant chain that operates seven locations in the Los Angeles metropolitan area. It was founded by Herb Hudson in 1975. The Los Angeles Times has referred to Roscoe's as "such an L.A. institution that people don't even question the strange combo anymore". The New York Times refers to it as a "beloved soul food chain." The original location in Long Beach, California, remains open.

On March 29, 2016, Roscoe's filed for Chapter 11 bankruptcy.

== Trademark infringements ==
In 2008, Roscoe's filed a successful trademark infringement lawsuit against a "Rosscoe's House of Chicken & Waffles" that had opened in Chicago. The infringing store was forced to drop its infringing logo and name. A previous "Rosscoe's" had opened in New York City, but the LA-based chain opted to not sue that location because it had no plans to enter the New York market; however, Roscoe's did plan to enter the Chicago market.

== Notable events ==
In 2011, President Barack Obama visited Roscoe's while on the campaign trail in Los Angeles.

On September 12, 2022, rapper PnB Rock was shot and killed at a Roscoe's in Los Angeles during a robbery.

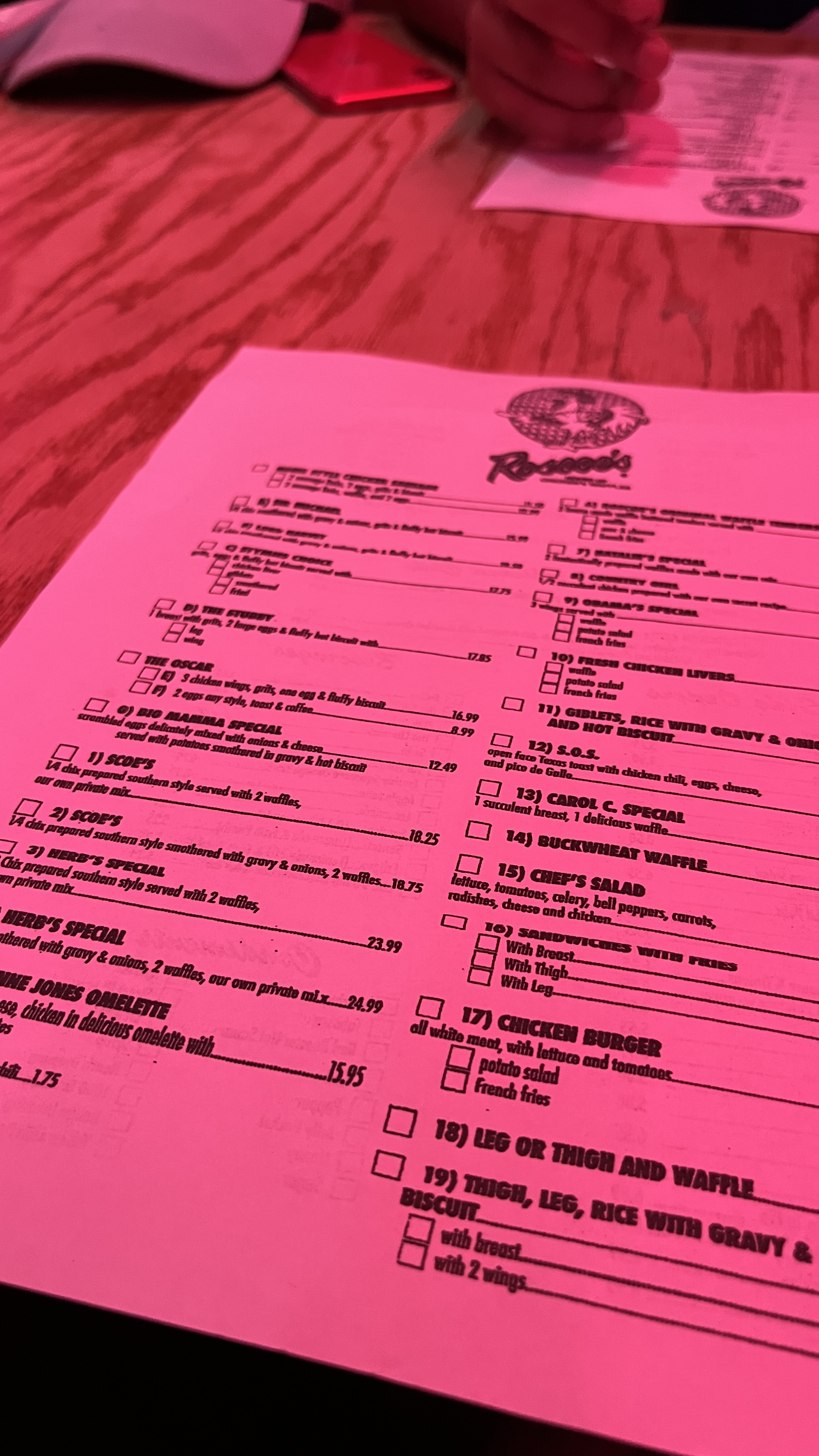
The menu in March 2022

== In film ==
The restaurant has been mentioned in numerous films including, Tapeheads, Swingers, Jackie Brown, Rush Hour, and Soul Plane.

In 2004, a full-length movie, Roscoe's House of Chicken 'N Waffles starring Glenn Plummer was released direct-to-video.

== See also ==
- List of soul food restaurants
