= Kee's Loaded Kitchen =

Soul food restaurant in Portland, Oregon, U.S.

- Interactive map of Kee's Loaded Kitchen

Restaurant information
- Owner: Kiauna "Kee" Nelson
- Chef: Kiauna "Kee" Nelson
- Food type: Soul food
- Location: Portland, Oregon, United States
- Coordinates: 45.5595°N 122.6613°W

Kee's Loaded Kitchen (stylized as Kee's #Loaded Kitchen) is a soul food restaurant in Portland, Oregon.

== Description ==
Kee's is a Black-owned, soul food restaurant on Martin Luther King Jr. Boulevard in northeast Portland's King neighborhood. The menu includes smoked brisket, fried catfish, chicken wings, loaded baked potatoes, macaroni and cheese, spaghetti, and desserts.

== History ==
Kiauna "Kee" Nelson is the restaurant's owner and chef.

In 2020, Kee's and Nelson appeared in a music video by Aminé. In June, during the George Floyd protests, donations from community members and Don't Shoot Portland allowed Kee's to provide free food to Black Portlanders. For Thanksgiving, Kee's offered turkey, smoked brisket, fried chicken, mashed potatoes, cornbread stuffing, collard greens, and sweet potato casserole. Desserts included banana pudding, coconut layer cake, and sweet potato pie.

The restaurant was featured on the Netflix series Street Food in 2022. Kee's caters large events.

== Reception ==
In 2018, Kee's was named Cart of the Year by Willamette Week. The business ranked second in the newspaper's annual 'Best of Portland' readers' poll in 2024. It was a finalist in the same category in 2025. Katherine Chew Hamilton included the business in Portland Mercury's 2026 list of the city's top twenty food carts.

Kee's was included in multiple Eater Portland lists in 2021. Nick Woo and Nick Townsend included the restaurant in "14 Real-Deal Fried Chicken Spots in Portland", writing: "When Kiauna Nelson of the MLK food cart Kee's Loaded Kitchen starts frying chicken for her loaded plates, it's a run-don't-walk situation. Nelson's chicken gets a heavy, spice-laden rub before it hits the fryer, and then gets hit with the 'magic dust,' a sweet-spicy powder almost reminiscent of barbecue potato chips. There's nothing in town like it. Now, Kee's can get some serious lines, so the real move is to get to the cart before it opens for a takeout order." Additionally, Woo and Brooke Jackson-Glidden also included Kee's in "15 Outstanding Portland Food Carts", and Ron Scott included the food cart in "9 Spots for Serious Soul Food in Portland and Beyond". The website's Ron Scott and Nathan Williams included the restaurant in a 2022 list of "13 Spots for Serious Soul Food in Portland and Beyond". Kee's was included in Eater Portland's 2025 overview of the city's best food carts.

== See also ==
- List of Black-owned restaurants
- List of soul food restaurants
