= Find the River =

1992 song by R.E.M.

Single by R.E.M.

from the album Automatic for the People
- B-side: "Everybody Hurts" (live)
- Released: November 29, 1993
- Studio: John Keane, Athens
- Length: 3:49
- Label: Warner Bros.
- Songwriters: Bill Berry; Peter Buck; Mike Mills; Michael Stipe
- Producers: Scott Litt; R.E.M.

R.E.M. singles chronology
"Nightswimming" (1993)	"Find the River" (1993)	"What's the Frequency, Kenneth?" (1994)

Music video
- "Find the River" on YouTube

"Find the River" is a song by American rock band R.E.M., released on November 29, 1993, by Warner Bros. Records as the sixth and final single from the band's eighth album, Automatic for the People (1992). The song reached number 54 on the UK Singles Charts in December 1993. It did not chart in the US. "Find the River" was one of only three R.E.M. singles released in the 1990s (out of a total of 24) to not make the Top 40 in Britain. The song's music video was directed by Jodi Wille.

== Background ==
The song's music was composed by Mike Mills, who plays bass, organ, piano, acoustic guitars and accordion on the song. Guitarist Peter Buck does not perform on the recording.

Regarding the song's backing vocals, Mike Mills explained to Melody Maker

"Harborcoat" from Reckoning has got me and Michael and Bill all doing completely unrelated things, and yet it works together. Because of the production we insisted on from Mitch and Don, which I know must have been incredibly frustrating for them, it's hard to pick out exactly what's going on. We tried it again on "Find the River". I had the idea that Bill and I would go in and do some harmonies without listening to each other. It's great because mine is this incredibly angst-ridden emotional thing, and Bill's is this really low-key sort of ambling part. They're two opposite ends of the spectrum but they're both on there, and it's a beautiful thing.

== Reception ==
Martin Aston from Music Week gave the song four out of five, writing that the sixth single to be lifted from Automatic for the People "will doubtless follow REM's five previous singles into the charts. Two new B-sides, including the MTV Music Awards version of "Everybody Hurts", are the tempters for the serious fans. Otherwise, the single's slow, moody swing has something winterish about it to take it high up the charts." Barbara Ellen from NME viewed it as "a rare REM track you can't suck some spiritual sustenance from". In a 1992 review of the album, Rolling Stone writer Paul Evans said, "R.E.M. has never made music more gorgeous" than "Find the River", calling it a "masterpiece". Alex Kadis from Smash Hits gave it four out of five, adding, "It's a gentle meandering folky job with accoustic [sic] guitars a-thrummin' and a-strummin'. And it's beautiful."

== Music video ==
The accompanying music video for "Find the River" was shot in September 1992 in Malibu, California, directed by Jodi Wille, and features a stripped-down studio performance by the band and Los Angeles "outsider" artist Henry Hill. In An Hour with R.E.M., which aired on MTV UK prior to the band's televised performance at Cologne Cathedral in 2001, Mike Mills introduced the video and explained that he selected it "because... I've never seen it, and I have absolutely no idea what's on it."

In the Warner Bros. promotional film for Automatic for the People, the band is seen performing the song live in their Clayton Street rehearsal room.

== Track listings ==
All songs were written by Bill Berry, Peter Buck, Mike Mills, and Michael Stipe.

- UK 7-inch and cassette single
1. "Find the River" – 3:49
2. "Everybody Hurts" (live) – 5:32
- UK CD single
1. "Find the River" – 3:49
2. "Everybody Hurts" (live) – 5:32
3. "Orange Crush" (instrumental) – 3:54

Note: "Everybody Hurts" was recorded at MTV Video Music Awards, Universal City, California, on September 2, 1993.

== Personnel ==
R.E.M.

- Bill Berry – drums, percussion, backing vocals
- Mike Mills – acoustic guitar, bass guitar, organ, piano, accordion, backing vocals
- Michael Stipe – lead vocals

Production

- Scott Litt – production, mixing engineer
- John Keane – recording engineer
- Stephen Marcussen – mastering engineer (Precision Mastering)
- Clif Norrell – recording engineer, mixing engineer

== Charts ==
=== Weekly charts ===
Weekly chart performance for "Find the River"
Chart (1993–1994)	Peak position
Europe (Eurochart Hot 100)	100
Iceland (Íslenski Listinn Topp 40)	3
UK Singles (OCC)	54
UK Airplay (Music Week)	29

=== Year-end charts ===
Year-end chart performance for "Find the River"
Chart (1994)	Position
Iceland (Íslenski Listinn Topp 40)	12
