= Communion Restaurant and Bar =

Restaurant in Seattle, Washington, U.S.

- Interactive map of Communion Restaurant and Bar

Restaurant information
- Food type: Soul food
- Location: Seattle, Washington, United States
- Coordinates: 47.6131°N 122.3016°W
- Website: communionseattle.com

Communion Restaurant and Bar, or simply Communion, is a restaurant in Central District, Seattle, in the U.S. state of Washington.

== Description ==
The Black-owned business specializes in soul food.

== Reception ==
In 2021, Seattle Metropolitan named Communion "Our Restaurant of the Year", and Condé Nast Traveler included the business in a list of the 12 best new restaurants in the world. The magazine recommended the Communion "for a nicer-than-casual date or group meal, if you can get in."

Megan Hill, Mark Van Streefkerk, and Jade Yamazaki Stewart included the restaurant in Eater Seattle's 2022 overview of "Where to Find Seattle's Most Essential Brunches". Also in 2022, Hill and Stewart included Communion in a list of "15 Great Places to Eat in Seattle's Central District", and Stewart included the business in a list of "Seattle Restaurants Ideal for Celebrating a Special Occasion".

== See also ==
- List of Black-owned restaurants
- List of soul food restaurants
