= Reo's Ribs =

Restaurant in Portland, Oregon, U.S.

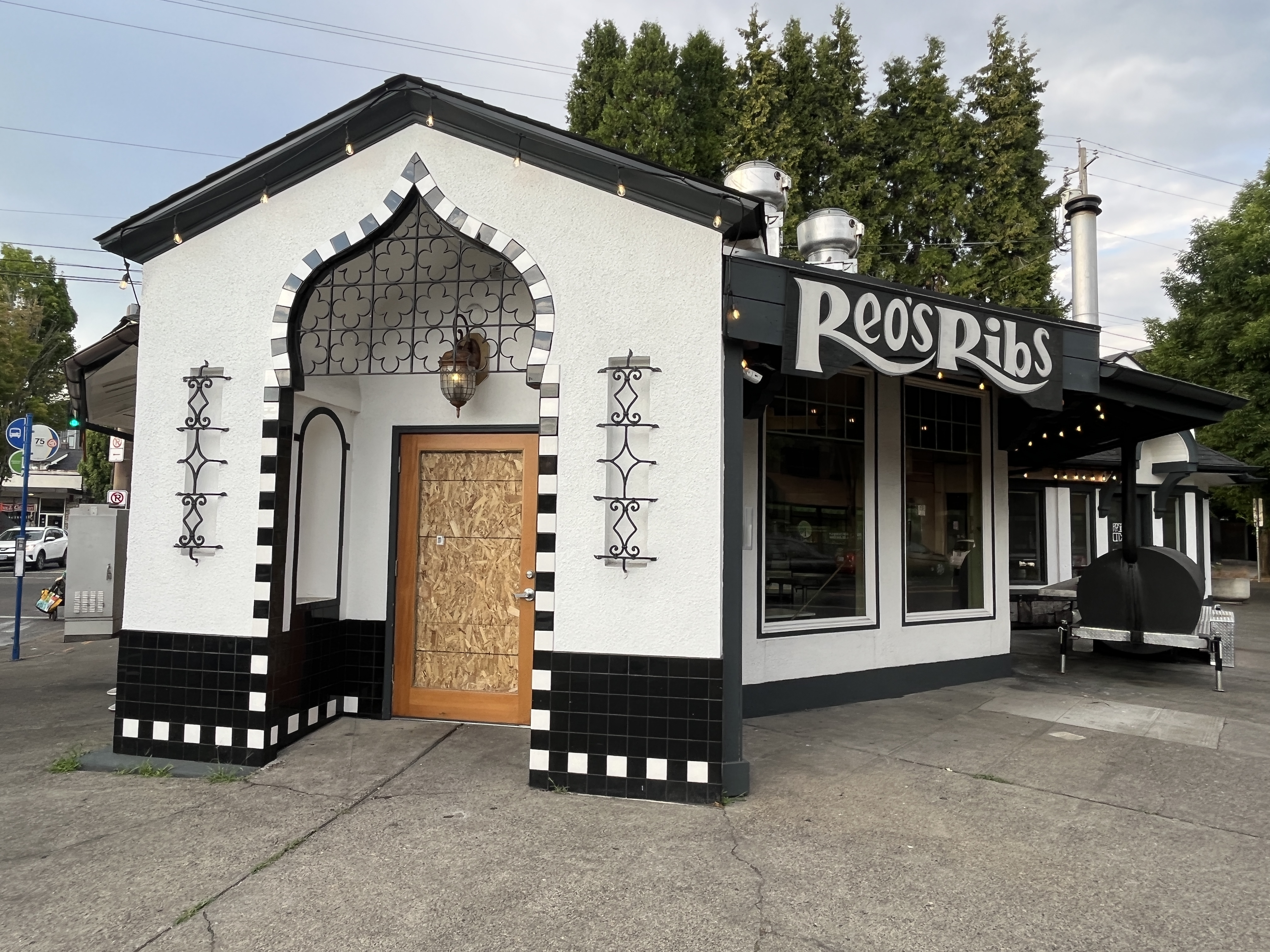
- The restaurant's exterior, 2022
- Interactive map of Reo's Ribs

Restaurant information
- Food type: Barbecue; soul food
- Location: 4211 Northeast Sandy Boulevard, Portland, Multnomah, Oregon, 97213, United States
- Coordinates: 45.5364°N 122.6198°W
- Website: reosribsbbq.com

Reo's Ribs is a barbecue and soul food restaurant in Portland, Oregon, United States.

== History ==
Reo's Ribs opened on Tualatin Valley Highway in Aloha in 1999. Reo Varnado and Myra Girod moved the business to a strip mall in southwest Portland's Johns Landing in April 2010. Reo's Ribs moved out of the strip mall in 2012. The restaurant operated on Powell Boulevard in southeast Portland, until January 2015.

Reo's Ribs relocated to northeast Portland's Hollywood neighborhood in 2015, taking over the space formerly occupied by Hollywood Burger Bar. The restaurant was damaged by a large fire in May 2017. Varnado believed racism was behind the fire, and an investigation was initiated. No evidence of arson was found. In November, Varnado confirmed plans to reopen the restaurant. Reo's Ribs reopened with a larger kitchen in 2018.

The restaurant was heavily damaged by another fire in November 2020. Investigators determine arson was the cause and a suspect was identified. Authorities released a photo of the woman who was responsible and offered an award for more information. After being identified by a community member, the suspect was arrested in December and charged with two counts of arson. Girod hoped to reopen the business in Spring 2021.

The Hollywood Boosters Business Association helped clean the site in March 2021. Following Varnado's death in January 2022, Snoop Dogg posted about his uncle and shared a video from Reo's Ribs.

The restaurant caught fire again in August 2022.

== See also ==
- Barbecue in the United States
- List of barbecue restaurants
- List of Black-owned restaurants
- List of soul food restaurants
