= Nightswimming =

1993 single by R.E.M.

Single by R.E.M.

from the album Automatic for the People
- B-side: "Losing My Religion" (Live)
- Released: July 12, 1993
- Studio: Criteria, Miami
- Genre: Baroque pop
- Length: 4:16
- Label: Warner Bros.
- Songwriters: Bill Berry; Peter Buck; Mike Mills; Michael Stipe
- Producers: Scott Litt; R.E.M.

R.E.M. singles chronology
"Everybody Hurts" (1993)	"Nightswimming" (1993)	"Find the River" (1993)

Music video
- "Nightswimming" on YouTube

"Nightswimming" is a song by the American alternative rock band R.E.M., released in July 1993 by Warner Bros. as the fifth single from the band's eighth album, Automatic for the People (1992). The song is a ballad featuring singer Michael Stipe accompanied only by bassist Mike Mills on piano, a string arrangement by former Led Zeppelin bassist John Paul Jones, and oboe by Deborah Workman in the latter part of the song. Mills wrote the music and Stipe the lyrics, but the song is credited to the entire band. Stipe sings about a group of friends who go skinny dipping at night, which draws from similar experiences in the band's early days. The accompanying music video for the song was directed by Jem Cohen.

== Background and recording ==
Bassist Mike Mills recalled playing the song's piano riff at John Keane's studio in the band's hometown of Athens, Georgia; while Mills almost discarded the melody, it attracted the interest of singer Michael Stipe. Mills said, "I never thought it would amount to much because it was just a circular thing that kept going round and round and round. But it inspired Michael." While the song was not included on the band's subsequent album Out of Time, the demo recorded during those sessions was used for Automatic for the People, with a string arrangement by John Paul Jones added. According to Mills, his piano part was recorded at Criteria Studios in Miami, on the same piano used on "Layla" by Derek and the Dominos.

Guitarist Peter Buck recalled in 2003 that Stipe "listened [to the song] once, nodded his head to hear it again, and on the second pass he sang the lyrics. It was 'Nightswimming,' exactly like the record we would record a year later. I was standing in the corner, dumbfounded."

== Composition and lyrics ==
According to Buck in 2003, "Nightswimming" was the only R.E.M. song for which the lyrics were written before the music. However, in a 2019 interview, Stipe stated that "E-Bow the Letter" was the only time this had happened.

The basic track of "Nightswimming" was performed by Stipe on vocals and Mills on piano. Buck noted that the absence of drummer Bill Berry and himself from the song was typical of many tracks on Automatic for the People, where one or more band members would not appear on a given song.

The inspiration for the lyrics has been debated by the band members. Stipe suggested an origin in a 2001 Esquire article: "A few years ago, I wanted to write a song about night watchmen, so I hired one to guard the R.E.M. offices in Athens. I bought him a uniform and a flashlight and everything. He turned out to be kind of crazy and called me up in the middle of the night to tell me dirty stories about the Kennedys. I wrote the song about him, but he was so paranoid he said he was going to sue me, so I changed the lyric from 'Night watchman' to 'Nightswimming.'"

Conversely, Mills said, "It's based on true events", explaining that in the early 1980s R.E.M. and its circle of friends would go skinny dipping after the Athens clubs closed at night. "We'd go to parties, we'd go to the clubs and we'd go to the Ball Pump, and there would be any number of these same 50 people, so it was a very tight circle of friends." Buck holds a similar interpretation. Stipe says the song is about a "kind of an innocence that's either kind of desperately clung onto or obviously lost," and that it is only partly autobiographical.

== Release and reception ==
"Nightswimming" was released as a single on July 12, 1993, in the United Kingdom. It reached number 18 in Ireland and number 27 in the UK. In Australia, it was released on September 20, 1993, and reached number 71 on the ARIA Singles Chart.

Steven Hyden wrote for The A.V. Club that "Automatic for the People might be the most quietly serene rock record about loss ever made. There is no fear in this music; death is the album's main character, but he's presented as a vehicle for self-empowerment ("Try Not to Breathe"), immortality ("Man on the Moon"), and spiritual fulfillment ("Find the River"). On "Nightswimming", death returns to his home in the past, and memory is revealed as the last light emanating from a star that has burned out."

In his weekly UK chart commentary, James Masterton wrote, "And still they keep on plugging. R.E.M.'s fifth hit from the album is in a similar vein to "Everybody Hurts" which became their biggest hit ever back in May. Similar success may be difficult for this song, not being quite as universal as the last and due to the fact that the album Automatic for the People is now one of the biggest sellers of the year so far." Alan Jones from Music Week gave the song a score of four out of five and named it "Pick of the Week". He declared it a "rather intense song" and added that "The usual assortment of exclusive live tracks will convert this into another big hit." Paul Moody from NME noted "the poignant, croaky vocal from Sir Michael, the gorgeous, gossamer piano accompaniment and the lyric dripping with adult ennui". In a 1992 review of Automatic for the People, Rolling Stone writer Paul Evans called "Nightswimming" a "masterpiece" and the band's most "gorgeous" song. Conversely, Parry Gettelman of the Orlando Sentinel felt that "a repetitive piano riff and swelling strings overwhelm the slight tune."

In 2011, a Rolling Stone Readers Poll ranked "Nightswimming" as R.E.M.’s second best song, behind "Losing My Religion". The publication noted that "Nightswimming" "didn't do that well as a single, but in the past 20 years it's slowly become one of R.E.M.'s most beloved songs.” In 2021, it was ranked No. 160 on that year's edition of Rolling Stone's 500 Greatest Songs of All Time.

== Music video ==
A music video was produced to promote the single, directed by Jem Cohen. Two versions of the video were made, with the uncensored version of the video included on the band's 1995 Parallel video compilation. The British version was later made available on YouTube in October 2009, and had generated more than 10 million views as of January 2023.

== Cover versions ==
- A cover of the song by Dashboard Confessional is featured on disc two of their album A Mark, A Mission, A Brand, A Scar.
- British alternative rock group Gene recorded a cover as a B-side to their 1997 single "Where Are They Now?"
- The song was performed by Coldplay with Michael Stipe on their Austin City Limits performance. During the show, Chris Martin of Coldplay called it "the best song ever written."
- Ingrid Michaelson created a cover based around using a looper pedal for a charity event at Carnegie Hall.
- The song was performed by Sugarland on their 2009 live album Live on the Inside.
- "Nightswimming" is included on the compilation Stereogum Presents... Drive XV: A Tribute to Automatic for the People with versions by The Wrens and You Say Party! We Say Die!
- Azure Ray, who originally formed in Athens, covered "Nightswimming" on their 2018 EP Waves.
- Jason Isbell and the 400 Unit covered the song on their 2021 album Georgia Blue.
- Jason Segel covered the song in the end credits of "Hold Your Horsies", an episode of the third season of Shrinking.

== Track listing ==
All songs written by Bill Berry, Peter Buck, Mike Mills and Michael Stipe.

- 7" Single
1. "Nightswimming" – 4:16
2. "Losing My Religion" (acoustic live) – 4:55
- 12" and CD Maxi-Single
1. "Nightswimming" – 4:16
2. "World Leader Pretend" (acoustic live) – 5:16
3. "Belong" (acoustic live) – 4:40
4. "Low" (acoustic live) – 4:59

(All four acoustic live b-sides recorded live in Charleston, April 28, 1991, for the Mountain Stage radio program. "Losing My Religion", "Belong" and "Low" all taken from the album Out of Time)

== Personnel ==
R.E.M.

- Mike Mills – piano
- Michael Stipe – vocals

Additional musicians

- John Paul Jones – orchestral arrangements
- George Hanson – conductor
- Denise Berginson-Smith, Lonnie Ottzen, Patti Gouvas, Sandy Salzinger, Sou-Chun Su, Jody Taylor – violins
- Kathleen Kee, Daniel Laufer, Elizabeth Proctor Murphy – cellos
- Reid Harris, Paul Murphy, Heidi Nitchie – violas
- Deborah Workman – oboe

Production

- Scott Litt – producer, mixing engineer
- Stephen Marcussen – mastering engineer (Precision Mastering)
- Clif Norrell – recording engineer, mixing engineer
- Andrew Roshberg – second engineer

== Charts ==
Weekly chart performance for "Nightswimming"
Chart (1993)	Peak position
Australia (ARIA)	71
Europe (Eurochart Hot 100)	61
Europe (European Hit Radio)	36
Germany (GfK)	93
Ireland (IRMA)	18
New Zealand (Recorded Music NZ)	48
UK Singles (OCC)	27
UK Airplay (Music Week)	15

== Certifications ==
Certifications and sales for "Nightswimming"
Region	Certification	Certified units/sales
United Kingdom (BPI)	Silver	200,000^{‡}
^{‡} Sales+streaming figures based on certification alone.
