= The Sidewinder Sleeps Tonite =

1993 single by R.E.M.

Single by R.E.M.

from the album Automatic for the People
- B-side: "The Lion Sleeps Tonight"
- Released: February 1, 1993
- Genre: Rock; jangle pop
- Length: 4:06
- Label: Warner Bros.
- Songwriters: Michael Stipe; Peter Buck; Mike Mills; Bill Berry
- Producers: Scott Litt; R.E.M.

R.E.M. singles chronology
"Man on the Moon" (1992)	"The Sidewinder Sleeps Tonite" (1993)	"Everybody Hurts" (1993)

Music video
- "The Sidewinder Sleeps Tonite" on YouTube

"The Sidewinder Sleeps Tonite" is a song by American alternative rock band R.E.M. It was influenced by the song "The Lion Sleeps Tonight", both in the title of the song and through the song's opening refrain. The band used "The Lion Sleeps Tonight" as the B-side to this song in the U.S. The song was released on R.E.M.'s 1992 album, Automatic for the People, and was released as a single in February 1993, reaching number one in Iceland, number 13 in Ireland, number 17 in the United Kingdom, and number 29 in New Zealand. Its music video was directed by Kevin Kerslake.

The song was included on R.E.M.'s Warner Bros. "best of" album In Time: The Best of R.E.M. 1988–2003 in 2003, one of four songs from Automatic for the People to make the compilation. In the liner notes, guitarist Peter Buck remarked: "We included this song on Automatic in order to break the prevailing mood of the album. Given that lyrically the record dealt with mortality, the passage of time, suicide and family, we felt that a light spot was needed. In retrospect, the consensus among the band is that this might be a little too lightweight." Despite the song's success, it was one of few R.E.M. songs never performed live by the group.

== Lyrics ==
The lyrics are notably easy to mishear. A 2010 survey found that the chorus line "call me when you try to wake her up" was the most misheard lyric in the UK, beating "Purple Haze", with the most common mishearing according to the survey being "calling Jamaica".

A laugh by vocalist Michael Stipe can be heard at 2:33, immediately after he sings the closing line in the third verse "or a reading from Dr. Seuss" which refers to Dr. Seuss's rhymes. When trying to name-check Dr. Seuss, Stipe kept saying "Zeus" and laughs at his own inability to pronounce that correctly, which bassist Mike Mills kept trying to get him to do. Stipe says he loved Dr. Seuss as a child but always pronounced his name the wrong way.

The song's complete title is not featured in the lyrics, but there is the line "the sidewinder sleeps in a coil" as well as the later line "the sidewinder sleeps on its back". A sidewinder is a species of rattlesnake (Crotalus cerastes), and also an antique style of telephone, with a winding handle on the side. The lyrics frequently refer to making and avoiding phone calls. It is also an air pump such as the one used for inflatable mattresses. All three meanings seem to involve wordplay, but this seems to be the primary meaning.

Mike Mills said: "It's about somebody that doesn't have a place to stay. Part of it is also about what man can do that machines can't. The rest of it – I don't have any idea what it's about." Mills also allegedly said, "Half of the song is about somebody trying to get in touch with someone who can sleep on his floor. The other half - you're on your own." In the liner notes for Part Lies, Part Heart, Part Truth, Part Garbage 1982–2011, Stipe said the song has one of his favorite lyrics: "'Their world has flat backgrounds and little need to sleep but to dream.' Cartoon characters never just get sleepy, they always have to have a dream of some floaty kind."

== Critical reception ==
In his weekly UK chart commentary, James Masterton wrote, "Everyone's favourite track off the Automatic For The People album finally gets a single release to clock up another hit for the band who appear to be able to do no wrong. Whether it will realise its commercial potential is doubtful given sales of the album but it is generating media interest if only over the vexed question of exactly what Michael Stipe is singing about." David Stubbs from Melody Maker named it Single of the Week, adding, "One of the lighter moments from Automatic for the People, silvery and deceptively inconsequential, this is no "Shiny Happy People", though Stipe playfully borrows from "The Lion Sleeps Tonight", hangs up there in a precariously high register and compresses the line Call me when you try to wake her into something that sounds more like Calling Jamaica, even stumbling into a giggle on the last chorus." Parry Gettelman from Orlando Sentinel said that "banal orchestral arrangements" by Led Zeppelin's John Paul Jones "don't add anything" to the song, "wherein Stipe's harsh vocal could use a little help".

== Music video ==
The music video for "The Sidewinder Sleeps Tonite", released in February 1993, was directed by American filmmaker and photographer Kevin Kerslake, produced by Tina Silvey and Line Postmyr through production company Silvey & Co. and edited by Robert Duffy. Silvey and Postmyr produced many of Kerslake's music videos in the early 1990s (e.g. Ride's "Vapour Trail" and "Leave Them All Behind", Nirvana's "In Bloom", Red Hot Chili Peppers's "Soul to Squeeze" as well as Soundgarden's Motorvision home video). The video is often erroneously attributed to Peter Care—in the past even on R.E.M.HQ, this has since been rectified—who was never signed to Silvey & Co. and who directed through Propaganda Films' sister shop Satellite Films from 1992 to 2000. The wrong director credit originated on the rec.music.rem newsgroup.

== Track listings ==
All songs were written by Bill Berry, Peter Buck, Mike Mills and Michael Stipe except as noted.

- US 7-inch, cassette, and CD single
1. "The Sidewinder Sleeps Tonite" (album version) – 4:04 (4:06 on CD)
2. "The Lion Sleeps Tonight" (Solomon Linda, Luigi Creatore, Hugo Peretti, George David Weiss) – 2:41
- UK 7-inch and cassette single
1. "The Sidewinder Sleeps Tonite" (LP version)
2. "Get Up" (album version)
- UK CD1
1. "The Sidewinder Sleeps Tonite" – 4:06
2. "The Lion Sleeps Tonight" (Linda, Creatore, Peretti, Weiss) – 2:41
3. "Fretless" – 4:49
- UK CD2
1. "The Sidewinder Sleeps Tonite" – 4:06
2. "Organ Song" – 3:28
3. "Star Me Kitten" (demo) – 3:04
- German CD single
1. "The Sidewinder Sleeps Tonite" – 4:06
2. "Fretless" – 4:49
3. "The Lion Sleeps Tonight" (Linda, Creatore, Peretti, Weiss) – 2:41
4. "Organ Song" – 3:28

== Charts ==
=== Weekly charts ===
Chart (1993)	Peak position
Australia (ARIA)	99
Belgium (Ultratop 50 Flanders)	40
Canada Top Singles (RPM)	60
Europe (Eurochart Hot 100)	41
Europe (European Hit Radio)	16
Germany (GfK)	61
Iceland (Íslenski Listinn Topp 40)	1
Ireland (IRMA)	13
Netherlands (Single Top 100 Tipparade)	14
New Zealand (Recorded Music NZ)	29
UK Singles (Official Charts)	17
UK Airplay (Music Week)	1
US Alternative Airplay (Billboard)	24
US Mainstream Rock (Billboard)	28

=== Year-end charts ===
Chart (1993)	Position
Iceland (Íslenski Listinn Topp 40)	3
UK Airplay (Music Week)	37

== Certifications ==
Certifications for "The Sidewinder Sleeps Tonite"
Region	Certification	Certified units/sales
United Kingdom (BPI) Sales since 2004	Silver	200,000^{‡}
^{‡} Sales+streaming figures based on certification alone.

== Release history ==
Region	Date	Format(s)	Label(s)	Ref.
United Kingdom	February 1, 1993	7-inch vinyl; CD; cassette	Warner Bros.	
Australia	February 28, 1993	CD; cassette	Warner Bros.	
