= H&H Restaurant =

Soul food restaurant in Macon, Georgia, US

Coordinates: 32°50′09″N 83°38′05″W

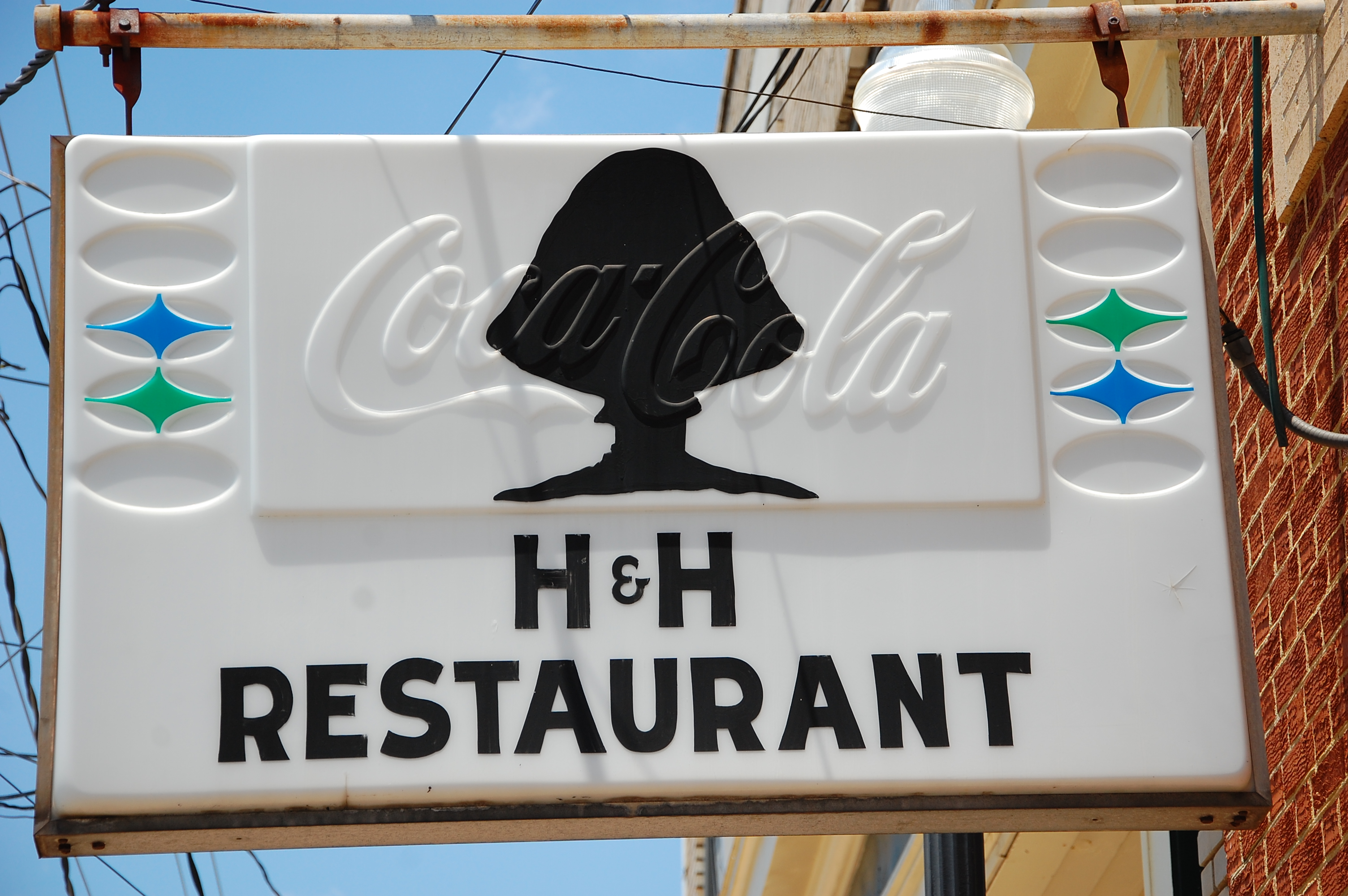
Sign in front of the building

H&H Restaurant in Macon, Georgia specializes in soul food.. It opened in 1959, closed in 2013, and reopened in 2014 under the ownership of the Moonhanger Group which owns several local restaurants.

== See also ==
- List of soul food restaurants
