= Screen Door (restaurant) =

Restaurant in Portland, Oregon, U.S.

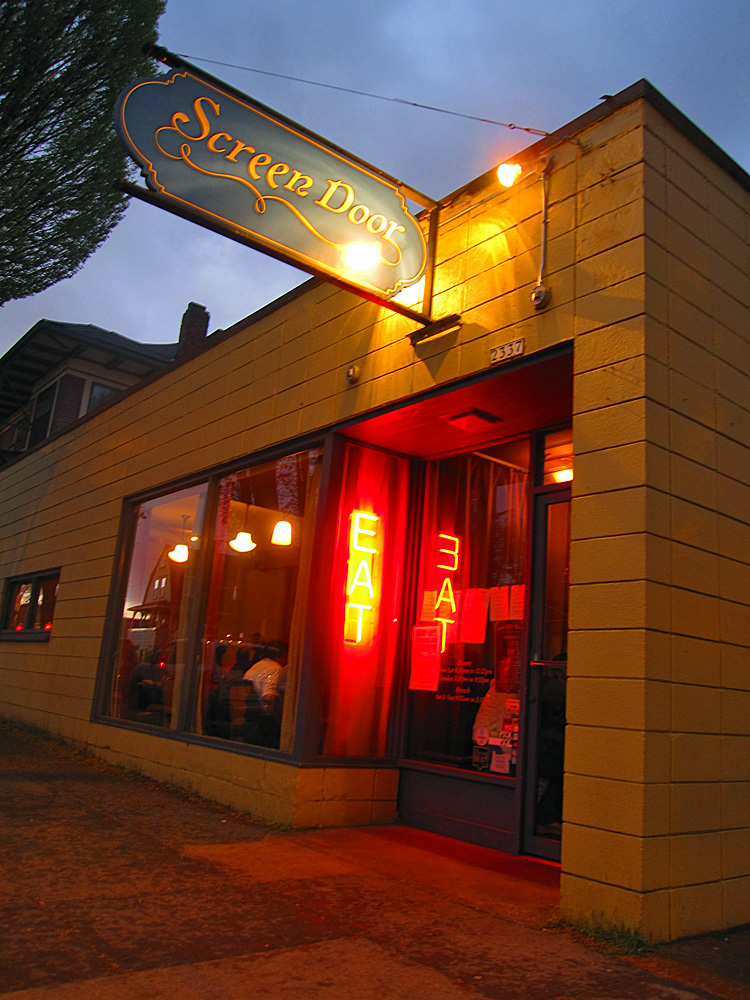
- The original restaurant's front exterior in 2010
- Interactive map of Screen Door

Restaurant information
- Owner: David Mouton (co-owner)
- Food type: Southern; soul food
- Location: 2337 East Burnside Street, Portland, Multnomah, Oregon, 97214, United States
- Coordinates: 45.52310°N 122.64171°W
- Website: screendoorrestaurant.com

Screen Door is a popular Southern and soul food restaurant with three locations in Portland, Oregon, in the United States.

== Description ==
Screen Door is a popular Southern and soul food restaurant with three locations in Portland, Oregon. The original restaurant is located at 2337 East Burnside Street in the Kerns neighborhood. In 2021, a second location opened in Northwest Portland's Pearl District. The business also operates at Portland International Airport in Northeast Portland.

Screen Door often has a line. According to co-owner David Mouton, the restaurant can host as many as 500 customers per weekend. Wait times are sometimes shared via voicemail. Screen Door warns guests, "Good fried chicken takes time. Please consider this when ordering."

=== Menu ===
Screen Door's specialty is crispy buttermilk-battered fried chicken, sometimes accompanied with sweet potato waffles. The menu also includes biscuits, fried green tomatoes, grits, macaroni and cheese, po' boy, pulled pork, and brisket; weekend brunch features Bananas Foster French toast and biscuits and gravy (sausage or vegetarian). The restaurant's hushpuppy recipe has been published by The Washington Post, and subsequently other outlets.

== History ==
In 2013, the restaurant's head chef Rick Widmayer left after serving for six years. Screen Door's current culinary director is Dominic Finzo.

Screen Door opened a second location in the Pearl District in 2021, and operates at the airport as of 2024.

== Reception ==
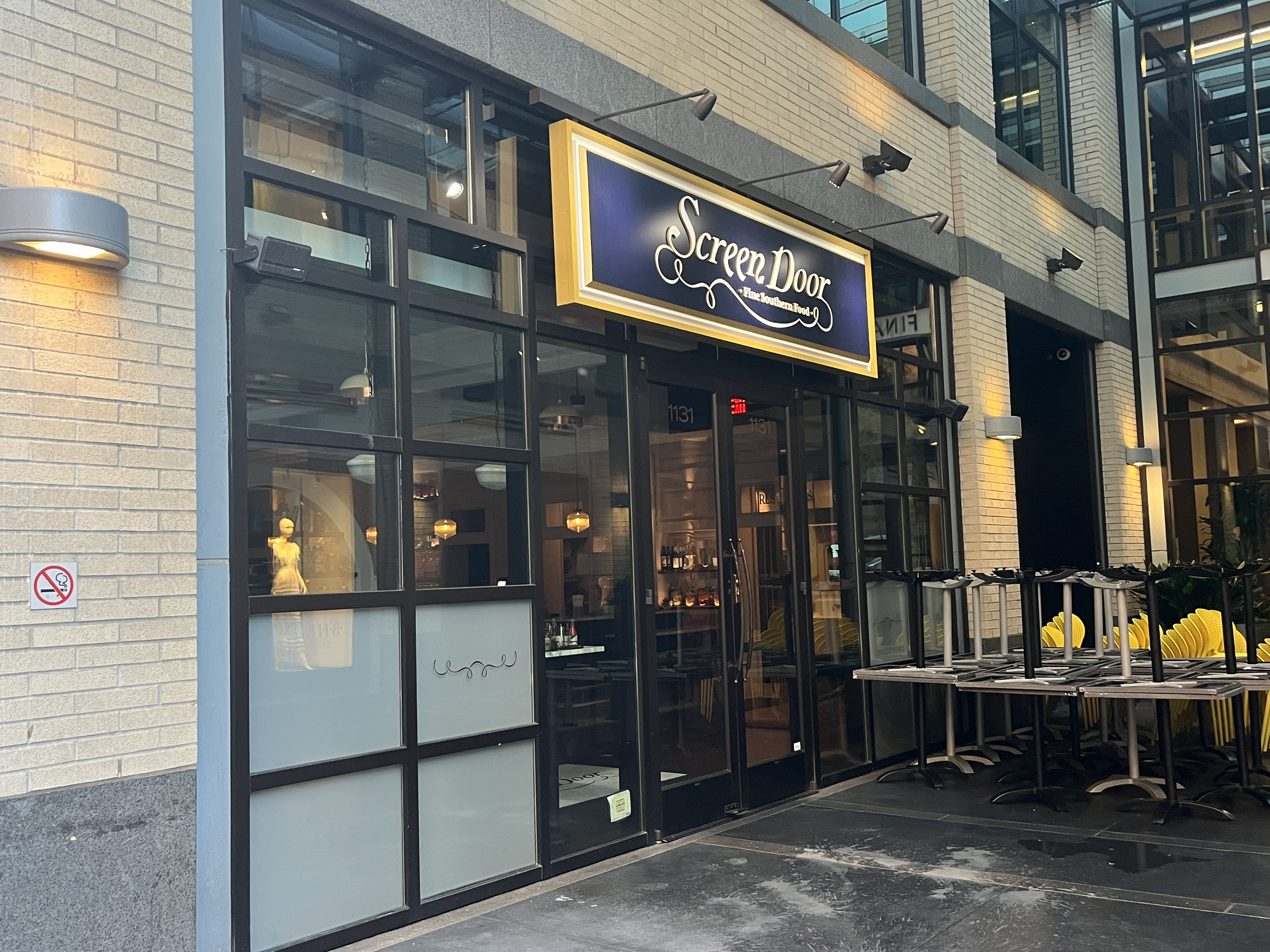
Exterior of the restaurant in the Pearl District, 2022

Screen Door has been associated with Portland's reputation as a food destination. In 2012, ABC News named Screen Door as one of the "Top Ten Restaurants in the Nation". The Cooking Channel has recommended the restaurant for the "best Southern breakfast on the West Coast". Glamour recommended the fried chicken and sweet potato waffles on their "must-try list for "serious foodies'" (2013). The Portland Mercury has described the restaurant as "spacious yet cozy", with a varied menu. Tom Sietsema of The Washington Post wrote, "If you have time for only one breakfast, make it this convivial Southern charmer, easy to spot due to the inevitable line out the door".

In 2012, Portland Monthly reviewed and contrasted the restaurant's fried chicken and waffles with Simpatica's recipe in the magazine's search for the city's best chicken and waffles. The magazine also included Screen Door's "Spicy Creole Bloody" recipe in its list of Portland's best Bloody Marys. The New York Times featured the restaurant in the 2015 article, "36 Hours in Portland, Ore." The restaurant's mashed potatoes and tasso gravy recipe was a contender in Portland Monthly's 2016 "Spud Bracket", which recognized the city's best potato "creations". The magazine also included the chicken and sweet potato waffle in a 2022 list of Portland's twelve best breakfasts.

Screen Door was a runner-up in the Best Brunch Spot category of Willamette Week's annual 'Best of Portland' readers' poll in 2022. The restaurant ranked second in the same category in 2024 and 2025. In 2024, Screen Door was featured on Yelp's top brunch list. In 2025, the business ranked ninth in a Yelp list of 50 restaurants serving the best fried chicken in the U.S. and Canada, and was included in Eater Portland's list of Portland's best brunch restaurants. Screen Door ranked fourth in the "best brunch" category of The Oregonian's 2025 Readers Choice Awards.

== See also ==
- List of restaurant chains in the United States
- List of soul food restaurants
- List of Southern restaurants
