= Memphis Cafe =

Soul food restaurant in California

- Location within the Los Angeles metropolitan area Location within California Location within the United States

Restaurant information
- Established: August 18, 1995
- Owners: Dan Bradley; Diego Velasco
- Food type: Soul food
- Location: 2920 Bristol St, Costa Mesa, CA 92626
- Coordinates: 33.6769°N 117.8866°W
- Website: www.memphiscafe.com

Memphis Cafe is a soul food restaurant and nightclub in Costa Mesa, California. It formerly operated a location in the Santora Building in Santa Ana, of which Gustavo Arellano of OC Weekly called "a pioneer in turning OC's county seat into a hipster mecca" and noted that it also helped launch the county's "cocktail revolution."

== Description ==
The building in which Memphis Cafe is housed in was built in 1953 and was formerly a hole-in-the-wall called the King's Inn. The restaurant's menu combines American, Creole, and Southwestern cuisine, serving foods such as jambalaya, ribs, and mint juleps. Its signature dish is the catfish po' boy. The Costa Mesa location has a more homey, Southern vibe in comparison to the former Santa Ana location, which was more airy and modern with a larger menu. The Santa Ana location was notable in that, with its popularity, it helped spur an increase of hipster, chef-driven concepts in Orange County in the 2010s.

The nightclub initially played live music such as soul and rockabilly, but switched to a DJ format in 1998.

== History ==
Memphis Cafe was opened on August 18, 1995, by Dan Bradley, Diego Velasco, and Andy Christenson. The trio met while working at the defunct Renaissance Café in Brea; Christenson eventually left the group in 2003 to focus on real estate. They had initially borrowed $50,000 to start the restaurant. They were assisted by the opening of The LAB Anti-Mall that same year, which attracted their target of indies and hipsters. In 2002, a second Memphis Cafe location was opened at the Santora Building in Santa Ana; it closed in 2014, with Bradley and Velasco stating that they wanted to reduce their portfolio to spend more time with their family. In 2015, OC Weekly named Memphis Cafe at the top of their "20 Most Important Orange County Restaurants of the Past 20 Years."
