= Souley Vegan =

Vegan soul food restaurant group

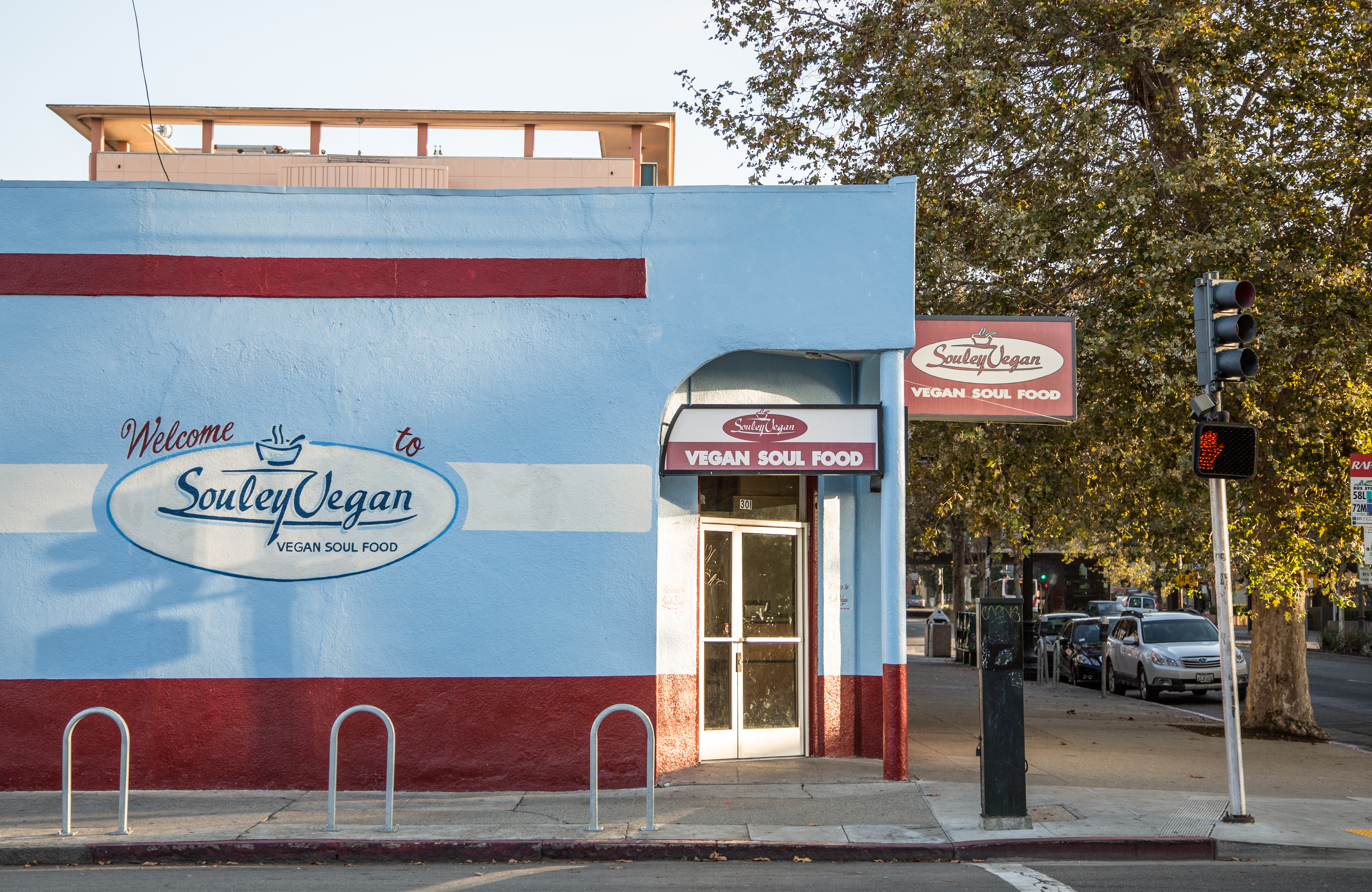
- Souley Vegan's flagship location in Oakland, California, in 2014.

Restaurant information
- Established: 2009
- Owner: Tamearra Dyson
- Head chef: Tamearra Dyson
- Food type: Vegan soul food
- Dress code: Casual
- Other locations: 4
- Website: souleyvegan.com

Souley Vegan is a vegan soul food restaurant group based in Oakland, California in the United States. Their only remaining location closed in October 2023, although the owner intends to reopen elsewhere. Their flagship restaurant was in Oakland. The restaurant group is owned by chef-founder Tamearra Dyson. They had additional locations, which have since closed, in Los Angeles, Las Vegas, and San Francisco.

== History ==
Tamearra Dyson opened Souley Vegan in Oakland in 2009. Dyson, a single mother attending nursing school while working in healthcare, has been vegan since she was seventeen. She began cooking vegan food for the general public at a local farmers market in 2006. In 2009, she quit her healthcare job and opened Souley Vegan in West Oakland. She completely funded the opening herself without investors. To this day, Souley Vegan remains solely funded by the business itself, no investors. Dyson's made her mission to educate the Black community on how to eat healthfully. Initially, Souley Vegan's guests were 95% white. As of 2020, 60% of her customers were Black.

During the COVID-19 pandemic in the San Francisco Bay Area in early 2020, which called for the closure of in-house dining for restaurants across the region, Souley Vegan saw a 70% decline in business.

In July 2020, Dyson announced that she would open three take out and delivery restaurants in California, specifically in West Hollywood, San Francisco, and a second Oakland location. The San Francisco and East Hollywood locations opened in August 2020, and a second Oakland location opened in September 2020. The following year, in September 2021, Dyson shared that she would open a sister restaurant, The Back Porch, behind her flagship Souley Vegan in Oakland. The Back Porch serves cocktails and upscale vegan Cajun food.

The Back Porch never opened, and the Oakland location closed in October 2023. A new Oakland location in Jack London Square, announced for April 2025, was inaugurated in July 2025.

New location has soft opened in Martinez California.

== Architecture and design ==
The flagship Souley Vegan, at 301 Broadway in East Oakland, is located in the oldest building in Oakland. The building was built in 1857 out of brick and plaster in the simplified Italianate style.

== Cuisine ==
Souley Vegan specializes in vegan soul food. As of 2020, entrees included seitan steaks and mashed potatoes, crispy seitan and waffles, and a Southern Staples Bowl with grits, jambalaya, and roasted zucchini étouffée. The Soul Food Platter includes southern fried tofu, red beans and rice, and macaroni and cheese made with cashew cream. Souley Vegan also sells sandwiches.

Souley Vegan makes all their own vegan sauces, proteins and cheeses. All of their food is natural, with no additives. Produce is sourced from local, Black-owned farm Acta Non Verba Farms.

In 2021, VegNews called Souley Vegan "one of the premier vegan soul food restaurants in the country." The restaurant was featured on Diners, Drive-Ins, and Dives in 2016 and Check, Please! Bay Area.

== See also ==
- List of Black-owned restaurants
- List of soul food restaurants
- List of vegetarian and vegan restaurants
