= H&H Shooting Sports =

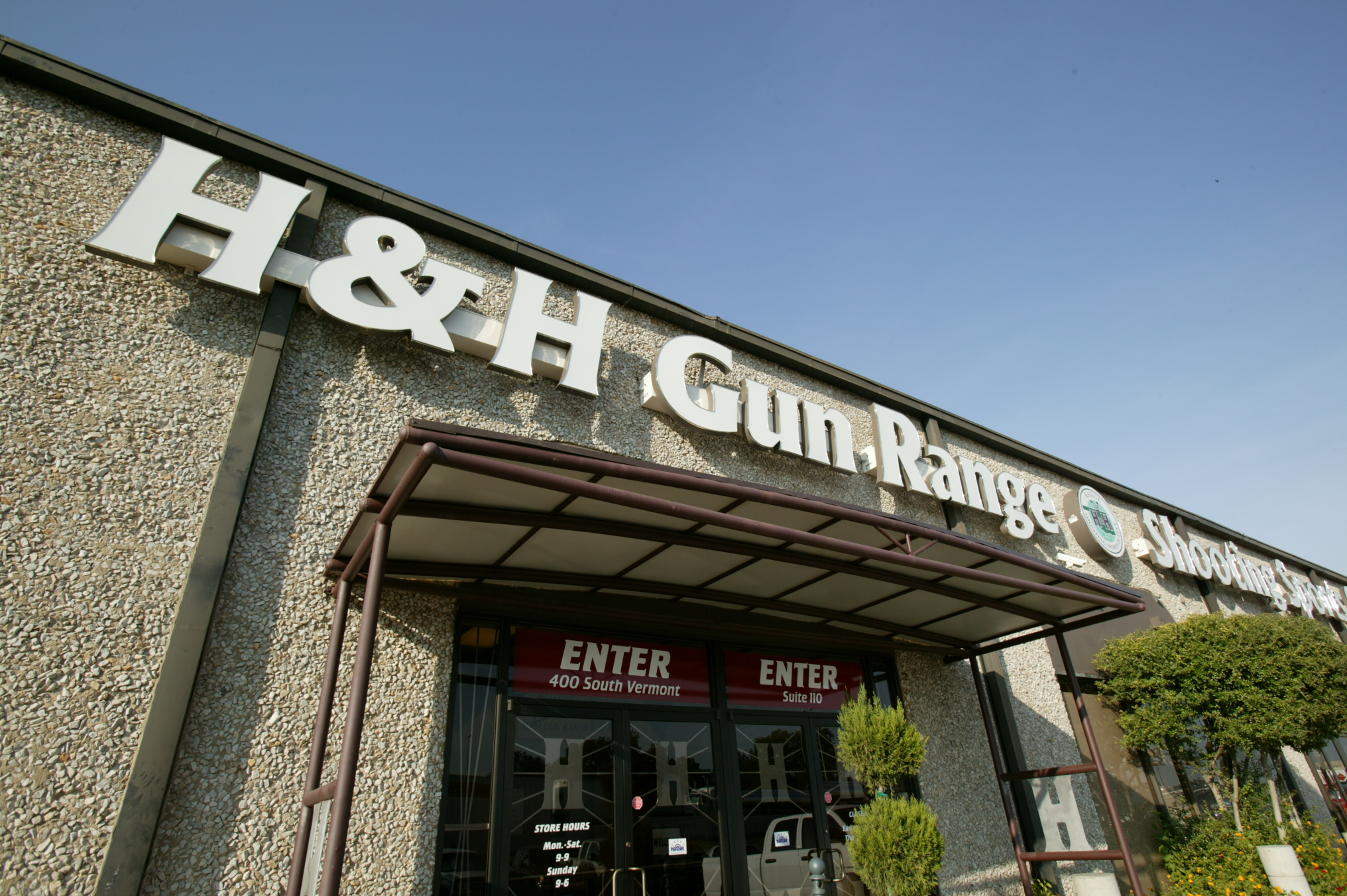
- Founded: 1981
- Headquarters: Oklahoma City, Oklahoma, United States
- Services: shooting range
- Website: https://www.hhshootingsports.com

H&H Shooting Sports is an indoor shooting range and retail facility located in Oklahoma City, Oklahoma, United States. The facility includes both firearm and archery shooting ranges and offers training programs for shooters of various experience levels. The complex is approximately 90,000-square-foot (8,400 m^{2}) and includes 42 public shooting lanes for firearms and 21 archery lanes for 63 total lanes. H&H is recognized by the National Association of Shooting Ranges and the National Shooting Sports Foundation as the first ever 'Five Star Facility'.

== History ==
H&H was established in 1981 by Miles and Jayne Hall of Oklahoma City. The first location was on 10th Street just west of Council Road. The 4,800-square-foot (450 m^{2}) facility held 10 lanes, a classroom and a lobby. In April 1990 H&H moved to its current location, 400 South Vermont Ave, Suite 110. The current location faces I-40 and is 90,000 square feet, it features 61 shooting lanes, three classrooms, a retail area, and an in-store café. The building is filled with animal mounts from all over the world and offers a sensory safari for sight impaired children.

Miles Hall announced in August, 2016 that H&H chairman Leroy Ussery had taken on the role of president. The Halls agreed to sell their stock in H&H Shooting Sports. Ussery continued to serve as the chairman of the board for H&H.

== Education ==
When H&H was first established, the main focus was to develop the sport of shooting and to teach firearm safety programs at every level. Their offerings include private instruction for beginning shooters, a concealed carry course, and advanced training courses. H&H also offers free programs to all members of the Boy Scouts of America to help them earn merit badges in archery, rifle shooting and shotgun shooting.

== Operations ==
=== Indoor shooting range ===
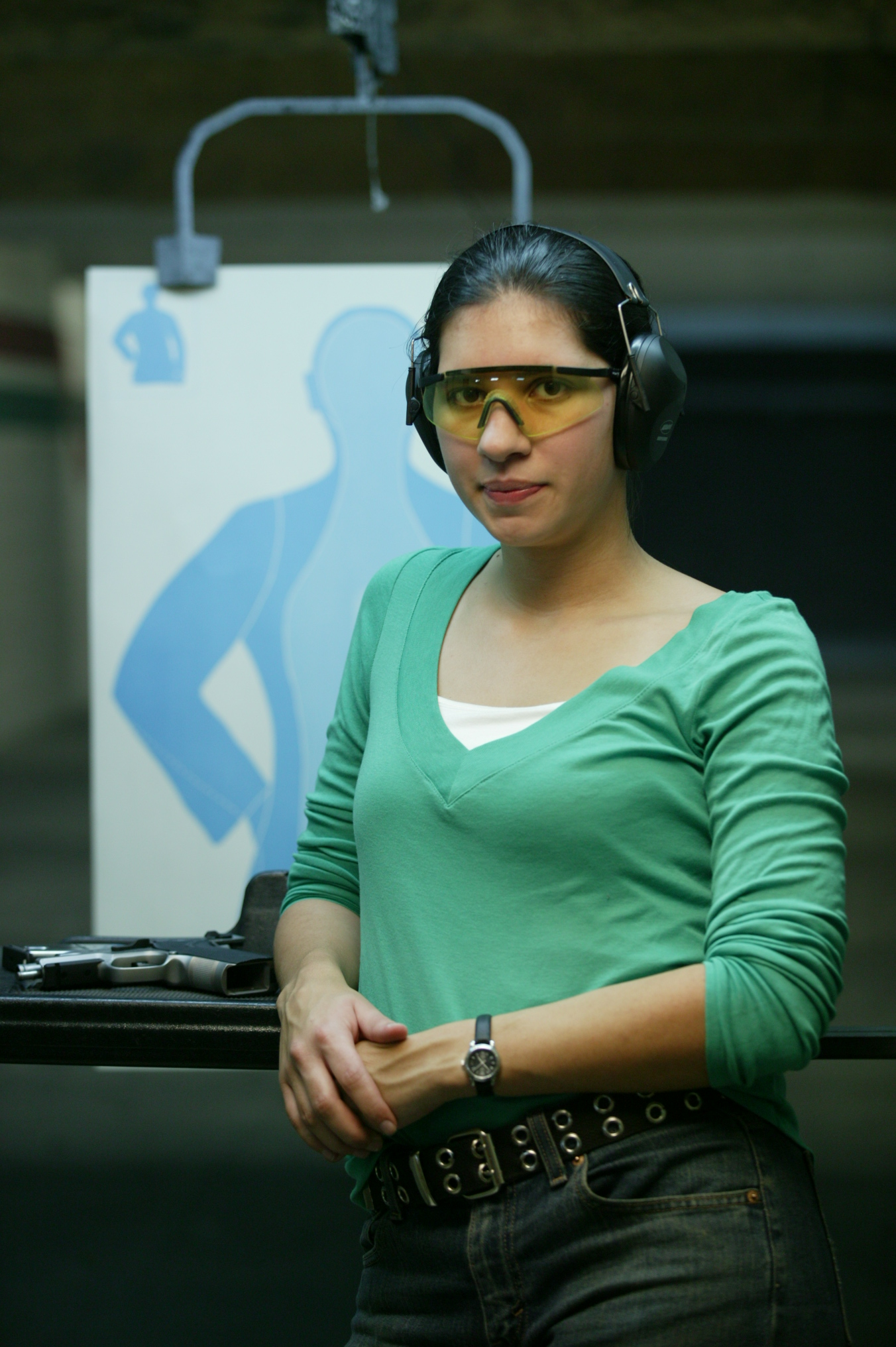
Shooter at the Range

There are a total of 42 firing lanes and targets can be set as far as 90 feet (27 m) from the shooter. The range's backstop is composed of recycled rubber from the side walls of tires. H&H can accommodate all shotgun and handgun calibers, plus all rifle calibers less energetic than 300 Weatherby Magnum/300 Remington Ultra Magnum. Each lane has an advanced system that controls that lane's respective target, increasing safety. This system is also more time efficient because it removes the need to walk down range to check or change targets. The range utilizes a system of air filters to keep the air fresh and clean by moving gasses away from shooters immediately.

=== Archery Department ===
The Archery Department was added in 2008 when H&H purchased competitor Outdoor Outfitters. There are a total of 21 archery lanes.

=== Retail and Services ===
The facility includes a retail store offering firearms, archery equipment, and related accessories, as well as services such as an onsite gunsmith and an in-store café.
