= My Life in Food =

My Life in Food is a television show aired on the Food Network. Each episode chronicles how food affects a famous personality. Guests have included Al Roker and Jeff Henderson.
