= Weaver D's Delicious Fine Foods =

Georgia restaurant

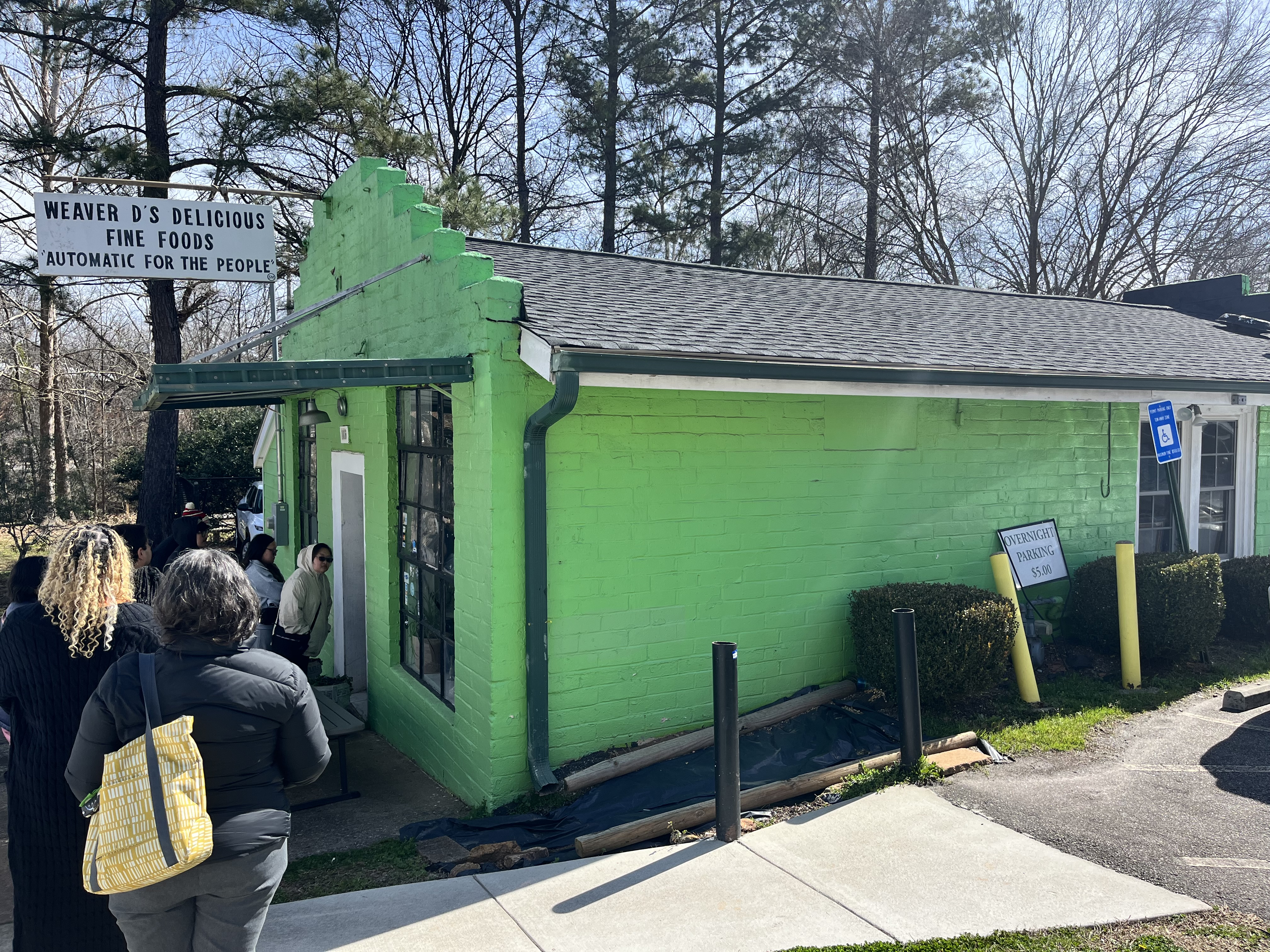
- Weaver D's in 2026

- Location within Georgia

Restaurant information
- Established: May 1986
- Closed: February 28, 2026
- Owner: Dexter Weaver
- Food type: Soul food
- Dress code: Casual
- Location: 1016 East Broad Street, Athens, Georgia, 30601, United States
- Coordinates: 33.958710°N 83.367324°W
- Seating capacity: 40

Weaver D's Delicious Fine Foods (colloquially known as Weaver D's) was a soul-food restaurant in Athens, Georgia, United States. It was in business for 40 years. Founded in 1986, replacing the former Riverside Cafe, it came to international attention six years later when local band R.E.M. named its eighth studio album, Automatic for the People, after the phrase the restaurant's owner Dexter Weaver says to his customers instead of "you're welcome." The restaurant is named Weaver D's as a throwback to Weaver's school days, when he was always at the end of the teacher's roll call. It can seat 40 customers. In 2007, the James Beard Foundation named it an American Classic, a designation given to small restaurants who provide "good, down-home food" and "unmatched hospitality."

R.E.M. lead singer Michael Stipe, a regular customer at the restaurant, approached Weaver with Bertis Downs, the band's manager and attorney, to get permission to use the restaurant's slogan.

"We had been burglarized the night before and had already been struggling. I wasn't the juvenated person I normally am when I sat down with them. At first I thought they were salesmen. When they introduced themselves and told me what they wanted, I began to smile." — Dexter Weaver, 2017

The automatic for the people slogan was used later in 1992 by Al Gore during a presidential campaign in Athens.

The star-shaped metal sculpture on the album's front cover, photographed by Anton Corbijn, was taken in Miami, but fans of the band came looking for it at the restaurant.

At the height of its popularity the restaurant served around 300 lunches, but it began to struggle financially from 2012, battling against the possibility of foreclosure. A worker came to shut off the restaurant's gas supply on September 28, but Weaver managed to defuse the situation. Local residents rallied, donating money and bringing more customers to the restaurant.

Another Athens band, the B-52s, are also fans of the restaurant. "I once sent food to them in Reno by FedEx," explained Weaver in 2003.

Weaver was born in Athens in 1954 and grew up in Baltimore, Maryland. He returned to Athens around 1979. In 1999, he released an autobiography–recipe book titled Automatic Y'all – Weaver D's Guide to the Soul.

The restaurant was put up for sale in October 2025. It closed on February 26, 2026, after 40 years in business. The building was purchased by local restaurant chain operator Joe Nedza, and now serves as the location for a chicken tender restaurant.
