= Everybody Hurts =

1993 single by R.E.M.

Single by R.E.M.

from the album Automatic for the People
- B-side: "Mandolin Strum"
- Released: April 5, 1993
- Genre: Rock; soft rock; gospel
- Length: 5:20 (album version); 4:57 (edit)
- Label: Warner Bros.
- Songwriters: Bill Berry; Peter Buck; Mike Mills; Michael Stipe
- Producers: Scott Litt; R.E.M.

R.E.M. singles chronology
"The Sidewinder Sleeps Tonite" (1993)	"Everybody Hurts" (1993)	"Nightswimming" (1993)

Music video
- "Everybody Hurts" on YouTube

"Everybody Hurts" is a song by American rock band R.E.M. from their eighth studio album, Automatic for the People (1992), and released as a single in April 1993 by Warner Bros. Records. It was written by the band and produced by them with Scott Litt. The song peaked at number 29 on the US Billboard Hot 100 and number 18 on the Cash Box Top 100. It also reached the top 10 on the charts of Australia, Canada, France, Iceland, Ireland, Israel, the Netherlands, Panama, and the United Kingdom. Its accompanying music video, directed by Jake Scott and filmed in San Antonio, Texas, won an award for Best Clip of the Year in the category for Pop/AC at the 1994 Billboard Music Video Awards.

In 2003, Q magazine ranked "Everybody Hurts" at number 31 on their list of the "1001 Best Songs Ever", and in 2005, Blender ranked the song at number 238 on their list of "Greatest Songs Since You Were Born". The song was placed on R.E.M.'s Warner Bros. "best of" album In Time: The Best of R.E.M. 1988–2003 in 2003. It was one of four songs from Automatic for the People to make the compilation, more than from any other album. The song is included on R.E.M. Live.

== Background ==
Much of the song was written by drummer Bill Berry, although as R.E.M. share songwriting credits among its members, it is unknown how much he actually wrote. Berry's drums are largely absent from the song—a Univox drum machine taking his place—but he was responsible for the sampling of the drum pattern on the track. The string arrangement was written by former Led Zeppelin bassist John Paul Jones.

Guitarist Peter Buck commented on the making of the track, saying:

"Everybody Hurts" is similar to "Man on the Moon". Bill brought it in, and it was a one-minute long country-and-western song. It didn't have a chorus or a bridge. It had the verse... it kind of went around and around, and he was strumming it. We went through about four different ideas and how to approach it and eventually came to that Stax, Otis Redding, "Pain in My Heart" kind of vibe. I'm not sure if Michael would have copped that reference, but to a lot of our fans it was a Staxxy-type thing. It took us forever to figure out the arrangement and who was going to play what, and then Bill ended up not playing on the original track. It was me and Mike and a drum machine. And then we all overdubbed.

In the liner notes of the album In Time: The Best of R.E.M. 1988–2003, Buck wrote that "the reason the lyrics are so atypically straightforward is because it was aimed at teenagers", and "I've never watched Buffy the Vampire Slayer, but the idea that high school is a portal to hell seems pretty realistic to me."

In 2005, Buck told the BBC: "If you're consciously writing for someone who hasn't been to college, or is pretty young, it might be nice to be very direct. In that regard, it's tended to work for people of a lot of ages." In 2022, Stipe told Rick Rubin that "Everybody Hurts" was inspired by Nazareth's cover of "Love Hurts".

Michael Stipe had originally intended for Patti Smith to be a second vocal on the track, but it did not work out. Smith later included her own cover of the song as a bonus track on the 2007 album Twelve.

== Critical reception ==
"The record's biggest surprise, however, is its one surefire pop hit, "Everybody Hurts", an almost unbearably passionate argument against suicide. It sounds like a gigantic arena transfiguration of a '50s rock ballad, with Stipe's voice pleading over triplets and massed strings, and surely will be played on radio for generations to come, right next to unforgettable anthems like "Bridge Over Troubled Water"."

— Greg Sandow talking about the song.

The song received favorable reviews from most music critics. AllMusic editor Stephen Thomas Erlewine found that it has "a comforting melancholy". David Bauder from The Associated Press said that it keeps "the pace slow and the mood melancholy." Larry Flick from Billboard magazine named it a "spare, honest, and emotional track", adding "when the strings kick in, there's no denying this song's power." Bevan Hannah from The Canberra Times noted its "smoothly caressing guitar". Another The Canberra Times editor, Larry McShane, described it as "haunting". Randy Clark from Cash Box named it the "strongest" cut of the album. Another editor of the magazine, Troy J. Augusto, felt it "might be a hard sell at radio, given the somber mood and suicide related theme". He complimented the singer's "silky vocals and the song's lush string section [that] provide this track's main appeal." Justin Wilson from The Cavalier Daily also named it "the best song on the album, one of R.E.M.'s best songs ever". He declared it as "emotionally moving" and "deeply affecting". Greg Kot from Chicago Tribune stated that it's "a ballad that would border on the maudlin if Stipe didn't sing it with such conviction". Ron Fell from the Gavin Report felt Stipe's "powerful and emotional life-affirming message comes across very clear." He named it "a favorite track" from the album. A reviewer from The Gazette commented that Automatic for the People ponders frustrations of life in the "Bee Geeish" 'Everybody Hurts'".

In his weekly UK chart commentary, James Masterton wrote that it is "the most beautiful and moving track on the album" and "just a reflection of how the band can do no wrong at present." Chris Roberts from Melody Maker named it Single of the Week, adding that "this is clearly a "Let It Be"/"Candle in the Wind" of its (white rock) generation, [and] it avoids being fatally overblown by virtue of Stipes's meticulously understated vocal." Pan-European magazine Music & Media described it as an "ultra melancholic ballad", noting that with string arrangements by ex Led Zeppelin bass player John Paul Jones, it is "the "Bridge Over Troubled Water" for the '90s with Michael Stipe as Simon & Garfunkel rolled into one." Alan Jones from Music Week named it Pick of the Week, declaring it as "a torchy ballad, with Stipe's fragile and waivering [sic.] vocal offset at times by discreet strings." He also complimented it as "radio-friendly". Gina Morris from NME called it "another larger than life, atmospheric pop song" along the lines of "Drive". Parry Gettelman from Orlando Sentinel viewed it as "boring" and "repetitive". People Magazine's reviewer found that here, the vocalist "succeeds at talking a friend out of suicide". Scripps Howard News Service wrote that the singer "has never sung better" and noted that "the unabashedly emotional" track "gives him plenty of range to display those pipes." David Cavanagh from Select said that it is "virtually beyond words." He added, "It will have non-REM maniacs in hysterics with its delicate Spector structure and childlike message ("everybody hurts, everybody cries...when you think you've had too much of this life, hang on..."). It will make everyone else cry. It really is that straightforward." Tim Southwell from Smash Hits gave the song five out of five, viewing it as "a beautiful, touching and absorbing ballad", and "bloody beautiful."

== Music video ==
In the accompanying music video for "Everybody Hurts", directed by British film director Jake Scott and filmed along the double deck portions of I-10 near the I-35 Interchange in downtown San Antonio, Texas, the band is stuck in a traffic jam. It shows the people in other cars and subtitles of their thoughts appear on screen. A man standing on an overpass drops pages from a book he is reading onto the cars below, while the subtitles read "Lead me to the rock that is higher than I" and "They that sow in tears shall reap in joy", quotes from the biblical Book of Psalms 61 and 126 respectively. At the end, all the people leave their cars and walk instead; then they vanish, followed by scenes of a newscast reporting on the unusual event. Although Michael Stipe is featured prominently in the video, he remains silent until the final "Hold On, Hold On" part of the song. The video was heavily inspired by the traffic jam in the opening dream sequence of Federico Fellini's 8½. "Everybody Hurts" won an award for Best Clip of the Year in the category for Pop/AC at the 1994 Billboard Music Video Awards.

== Track listings ==
All songs were written by Bill Berry, Peter Buck, Mike Mills, and Michael Stipe unless otherwise indicated. "Belong" and "Losing My Religion" were recorded live at the Capital Plaza Theater in Charleston, West Virginia, on April 28, 1992. "Orange Crush" was recorded live in Georgia, US, in November 1989.

- US 7-inch and CD single
1. "Everybody Hurts" – 4:46
2. "Mandolin Strum" – 3:45
- US 12-inch, maxi-CD, and cassette single 1
1. "Everybody Hurts" – 4:56
2. "Mandolin Strum" – 3:45
3. "Belong" (live) – 4:06
4. "Orange Crush" (live) – 3:58
- US 12-inch, maxi-CD, and cassette single 2
1. "Everybody Hurts" – 4:56
2. "Star Me Kitten" (demo) – 3:04
3. "Losing My Religion" (live) – 4:54
4. "Organ Song" – 3:23
- UK 7-inch and cassette single
1. "Everybody Hurts" (edit) – 4:46
2. "Pop Song '89" – 3:03
- UK CD1
1. "Everybody Hurts" (edit) – 4:46
2. "New Orleans Instrumental No. 1" (long version) – 3:28
3. "Mandolin Strum" – 3:45
- UK CD2
1. "Everybody Hurts" (edit) – 4:46
2. "Chance" (dub) – 2:32
3. "Dark Globe" (Syd Barrett) – 1:51
- European and Australasian CD single
1. "Everybody Hurts" (edit) – 4:56
2. "Mandolin Strum" – 3:45
3. "Chance" (dub) – 2:32
4. "Dark Globe" (Barrett) – 1:51

== Charts ==
=== Weekly charts ===
Chart (1993)	Peak position
Australia (ARIA)	6
Belgium (Ultratop 50 Flanders)	31
Canada Top Singles (RPM)	8
Europe (Eurochart Hot 100)	22
Europe (European Hit Radio)	13
France (SNEP)	3
Iceland (Íslenski Listinn Topp 40)	4
Ireland (IRMA)	6
Israel (Israeli Singles Chart)	3
Netherlands (Dutch Top 40)	4
Netherlands (Single Top 100)	4
New Zealand (Recorded Music NZ)	12
Panama (UPI)	8
UK Singles (Official Charts)	7
UK Airplay (Music Week)	1
US Billboard Hot 100	29
US Alternative Airplay (Billboard)	21
US Pop Airplay (Billboard)	13
US Cash Box Top 100	18

Chart (2010)	Peak position
Scottish Singles Sales (Official Charts)	86
UK Singles (Official Charts)	90

Chart (2012)	Peak position
Germany (GfK)	83

=== Year-end charts ===
Chart (1993)	Position
Australia (ARIA)	33
Canada Top Singles (RPM)	75
Iceland (Íslenski Listinn Topp 40)	68
Israel (Israeli Singles Chart)	22
Netherlands (Dutch Top 40)	18
Netherlands (Single Top 100)	35
UK Singles (OCC)	53
UK Airplay (Music Week)	36

== Certifications ==
Sales certifications for "Everybody Hurts"
Region	Certification	Certified units/sales
Australia (ARIA)	Gold	35,000^{^}
Denmark (IFPI Danmark)	Platinum	90,000^{‡}
France (SNEP)	Silver	125,000^{*}
Italy (FIMI) sales since 2009	Platinum	50,000^{‡}
New Zealand (RMNZ)	Platinum	30,000^{‡}
Spain (Promusicae)	Platinum	60,000^{‡}
United Kingdom (BPI)	Platinum	600,000^{‡}
^{*} Sales figures based on certification alone.^{^} Shipments figures based on certification alone.^{‡} Sales+streaming figures based on certification alone.

== Release history ==
Region	Date	Format(s)	Label(s)	Ref.
United Kingdom	April 5, 1993	7-inch vinyl; CD; cassette	Warner Bros.	
Australia	May 23, 1993	CD; cassette	Warner Bros.	

== Usage in media ==
In 1995, British emotional support listening service The Samaritans, in response to the high suicide rate but low crisis service take-up amongst young men, launched a UK press advertising campaign consisting solely of the lyrics to "Everybody Hurts" and the charity's hotline number.

U.S. President Donald Trump used the song in a Twitter video showing several Democratic politicians with sad-looking reactions towards his 2019 State of the Union Address. The former members of the band responded to this on their Twitter page, saying: "World Leader PRETEND!!! Congress, Media--ghost this faker!!! Love, R.E.M." Eventually, Twitter removed the video following a copyright complaint from Concord Music, the band's record label. Trump later re-uploaded the video, using Lee Greenwood's "God Bless the U.S.A." instead. Both versions of the video were created by a self-proclaimed Trump supporter named @CarpeDonktum.

== Helping Haiti charity single ==
"Everybody Hurts"

Single by Helping Haiti
- Released: February 7, 2010
- Recorded: January 2010
- Genre: Pop; gospel
- Length: 5:26
- Label: Syco
- Songwriters: Bill Berry; Peter Buck; Mike Mills; Michael Stipe
- Producers: Steve Robson; John Shanks

Music video
- "Everybody Hurts" (Fan video version) on YouTube

In an attempt to raise money for victims of the 2010 Haiti earthquake, British Prime Minister Gordon Brown asked Simon Cowell to arrange a charity single. Cowell chose "Everybody Hurts". Brown agreed to waive VAT on the single, and R.E.M. agreed to waive all royalties. The release would be under the name Helping Haiti.

Proceeds from the single were to be split between The Sun's Helping Haiti fund and the Disasters Emergency Committee. The single was released digitally on February 7, 2010, and physically on February 8, 2010.

Reportedly, the single's sales in the UK were approximately 205,000 copies in its first two days and 453,000 in its first week, making it the fastest-selling charity record of the 21st century in Britain.

This cover is also noteworthy for featuring Robbie Williams' first collaboration with Take That since Williams parted ways with the group in 1995, although neither act was present for each other's recording session.

This release also marks Jon Bon Jovi's first No. 1 appearance on the UK Singles Chart.

=== Artists ===
The song is performed by the following artists (in order of appearance):

- Leona Lewis
- Rod Stewart
- Mariah Carey
- Cheryl
- Mika
- Michael Bublé
- Joe McElderry
- Miley Cyrus
- James Blunt
- Gary Barlow
- Mark Owen
- Jon Bon Jovi
- James Morrison
- Alexandra Burke
- Jason Orange
- Susan Boyle
- JLS
- Shane Filan
- Mark Feehily
- Kylie Minogue
- Robbie Williams
- Kian Egan
- Nicky Byrne

=== Chart performance for Helping Haiti version ===
Following its February 7, 2010, release in the UK and Ireland, Helping Haiti's song entered the Irish Singles Chart on February 12 at No. 1. It entered the UK Singles Chart on February 14 at No. 1, spending two weeks at the top spot before dropping to No. 9. The single debuted on the Australian Singles Chart on February 23 at No. 28.

=== Music video for Helping Haiti version ===
A five-minute promotional short documentary was broadcast on ITV at 20.30 on February 7, 2010. The documentary includes "behind the scenes" footage of the featured performers (except for Carey, Cyrus, Bon Jovi, and Minogue) recording their vocals intercut with real-world images and footage from the earthquake aftermath, opening with a statement of what happened on January 12, 2010, and continuing with footage showing the devastation in the country and the suffering of the Haitians. The official music video, directed by Joseph Kahn, premiered on March 6, 2010. Jon Bon Jovi and Michael Bublé are the only featured artists not to appear in this video.

=== Track listing for Helping Haiti version ===
1. "Everybody Hurts" – 5:24
2. "Everybody Hurts" (alternative mix) – 5:35

=== Charts for Helping Haiti version ===
==== Weekly charts ====
Weekly chart peerformance for "Everybody Hurts"
Chart (2010)	Peak position
Australia (ARIA)	28
Austria (Ö3 Austria Top 40)	23
Belgium (Ultratip Bubbling Under Flanders)	1
Belgium (Ultratip Bubbling Under Wallonia)	1
Canada Hot 100 (Billboard)	59
Germany (GfK)	16
Ireland (IRMA)	1
Italy Digital Download (FIMI)	14
Netherlands (Dutch Top 40 Tipparade)	5
New Zealand (Recorded Music NZ)	17
Scottish Singles Sales (Official Charts)	1
Spain (Promusicae)	39
Sweden (Sverigetopplistan)	21
Switzerland (Schweizer Hitparade)	16
UK Singles (Official Charts)	1
US Bubbling Under Hot 100 (Billboard)	21

==== Year-end charts ====
Year-end chart peerformance for "Everybody Hurts"
Chart (2010)	Position
UK Singles (OCC)	11

=== Certifications for Helping Haiti version ===
Certifications and sales for "Everybody Hurts"
Region	Certification	Certified units/sales
United Kingdom (BPI)	Platinum	600,000^{^}
^{^} Shipments figures based on certification alone.
