= Guy Garcia =

American author

Guy Garcia is an American author and entrepreneur. He co-founded the internet start-ups Total New York and AOL Latino. Garcia has authored several books and currently produces virtual reality projects.

While working as a journalist, Garcia co-founded Total New York, where he managed the development of interactive content. In 2004, he founded Mentametrix, collaborating on consumer marketing projects with Harvard University and the creators of the Implicit Association Test (IAT). Mentametrix focused on multicultural consumer insight and online research technologies.

In 2004, Garcia published The New Mainstream: How the Multicultural Consumer is Transforming American Business, which addressed demographic and marketing trends in the multi-ethnic American population. He also wrote The Decline of Men: How the American Male Is Tuning Out, Giving Up, and Flipping Off His Future, analyzing issues affecting American males. Publishers Weekly reviewed it as "an astute and well-researched meditation on how men might reclaim their identity and place in modern America, and why such a transformation is important to future generations of both men and women."

In 2015, he published his fourth book, _SWARM_. Kirkus Reviews wrote, "Readers are treated to what might be written if the misanthropic author Chuck Palahniuk gave the freewheeling Thomas Pynchon a blood transfusion...a white-hot ingot of daring, disciplined storytelling."

== Bibliography ==
=== Fiction ===
_SWARM_ (Morphic Books, 2016)

Spirit of the Maya (Walker & Company, 1997)

Obsidian Sky (Simon & Schuster, 1995)

Skin Deep (Farrar, Straus & Giroux, 1989)

=== Nonfiction ===
The Decline of Men: How the American Male Is Tuning Out, Giving Up, and Flipping Off His Future (HarperCollins, 2009)

The New Mainstream: How the Multicultural Consumer is Transforming American Business (HarperCollins, 2004)

=== Anthologies ===
Paper Dance: 55 Latino Poets (Persea Books, 1995)

Pieces of the Heart: New Chicano Fiction (Chronicle Books, 1993)

Iguana Dreams: New Latino Fiction (HarperCollins, 1992)
