= Fat's Chicken and Waffles =

Restaurant in Seattle, Washington, U.S.

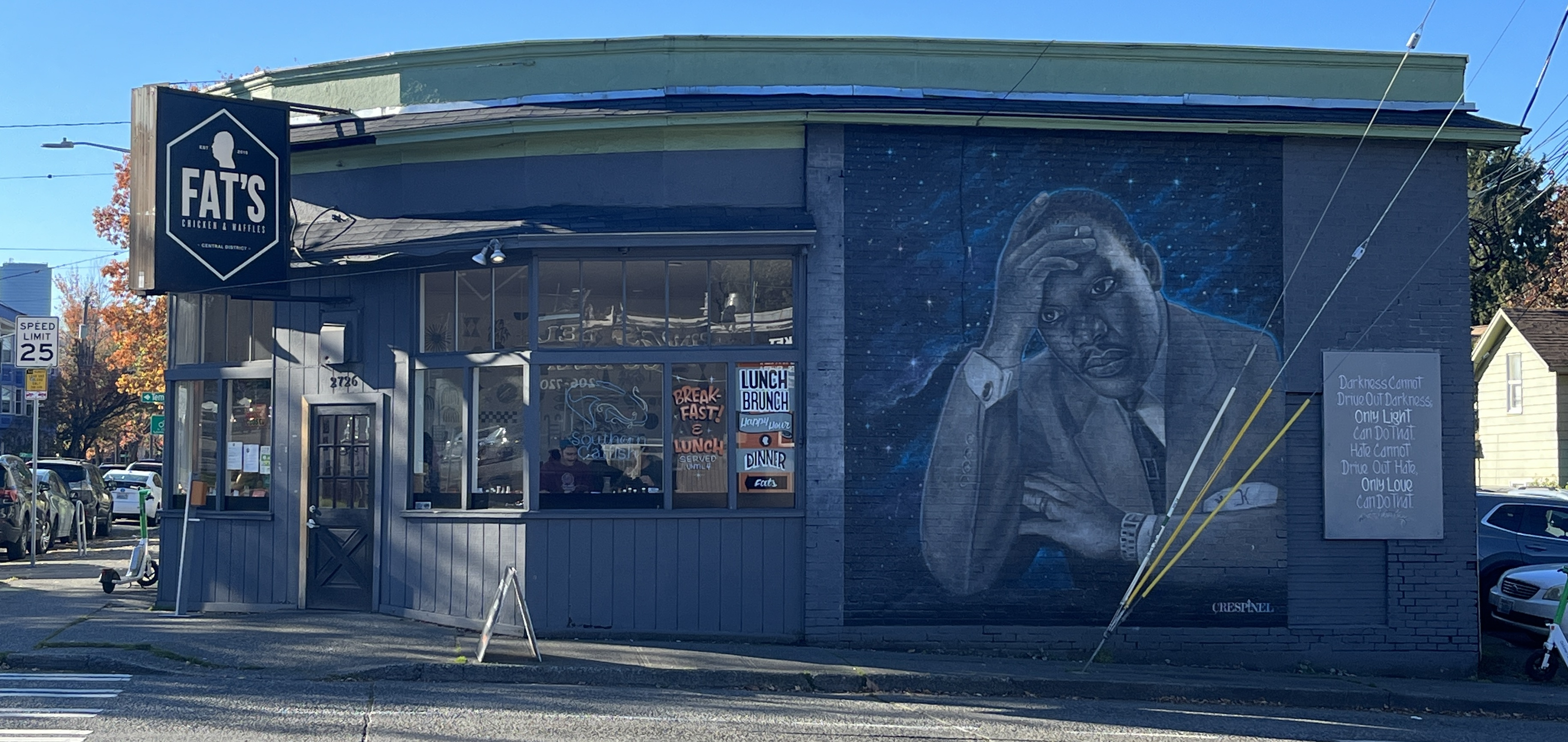
- The restaurant's exterior in 2023
- Interactive map of Fat's Chicken and Waffles

Restaurant information
- Established: September 2015
- Owners: Marcus Lalario; Erika White
- Food type: American; Cajun; Creole; New American; soul food; Southern
- Location: 2726 E Cherry Street, Seattle, King, Washington, 98122, United States
- Coordinates: 47.6082°N 122.2964°W
- Seating capacity: 30–35 people
- Reservations: No
- Website: fatschickenandwaffles.com

Fat's Chicken and Waffles is a primarily Southern and soul food restaurant in Seattle's Central District, in the U.S. state of Washington. Marcus Lalario opened the restaurant in 2015, in a space which previously housed Catfish Corner. Erika White later became a co-owner.

The menu has included chicken and waffles, fried okra, shrimp and grits, red beans and rice, collard greens, cornbread, fried green tomatoes, and macaroni and cheese, as well as biscuits and gravy and eggs Benedict for brunch. Fat's has garnered a positive reception, especially for its fried chicken, and is considered one of the city's best Southern and brunch eateries. The exterior features a mural by James Crespinel depicting Martin Luther King Jr., which was originally painted in 1995 and later restored by the artist twice.

== Description ==
Fat's Chicken and Waffles is a restaurant at the intersection of Martin Luther King Jr. Way and Cherry Street in Seattle's Central District. Fat's is most often described as a Southern restaurant, but has also been called American, New American, Cajun, and Creole. The restaurant serves breakfast, lunch, and dinner daily, except on Mondays. Seattle's Child magazine has described the restaurant as kid-friendly, and Fat's has been highlighted as one of Seattle's Black- and LGBTQ-owned businesses. Thrillist has said the restaurant offers "generous" portions. Fat's does not take reservations.

The 900-square-foot (84 m^{2}) space has a seating capacity of 30 to 35 people. According to Seattle Metropolitan, the "midcentury-toned" dining room has a "relaxed" vibe. Inside, there is a dreamcatcher mounted over the bar, vintage lamps at tables, and plants hanging from macramé planters. The interior also has furniture and artworks by local artists, including benches, chairs and tables by Nick Yoshihara, and a mural by Jesse Brown. The exterior has a 17-foot (5.2 m) portrait of Martin Luther King Jr., originally painted by James Crespinel in 1995.

The New Orleans-inspired menu has included chicken and waffles, fried okra, shrimp and grits, red beans and rice, and other soul food. Fat's has plates and sandwiches with catfish, chicken, shrimp, and fried oysters, and sides like collard greens, cornbread, fried green tomatoes, macaroni and cheese, and garlic toast. Other options include pimento BLTs, a frito pie, a honey butter chicken biscuit sandwich, and fried fruit pies. Weekend brunch offers biscuits and gravy, eggs Benedict, and a biscuit sandwich with fried chicken, egg, sausage gravy, and bacon. Drinks include beer, wine, and cocktails, as well as punch and sweet tea.

== History ==
Fat's was originally owned by Marcus Lalario, who opened the restaurant in September 2015, in a space which previously housed Catfish Corner. He was partly inspired by one of Yoshihara's mid-century modern chairs. The menu was developed by chef Patrick Dours. General manager Erika White became a co-owner of the restaurant.

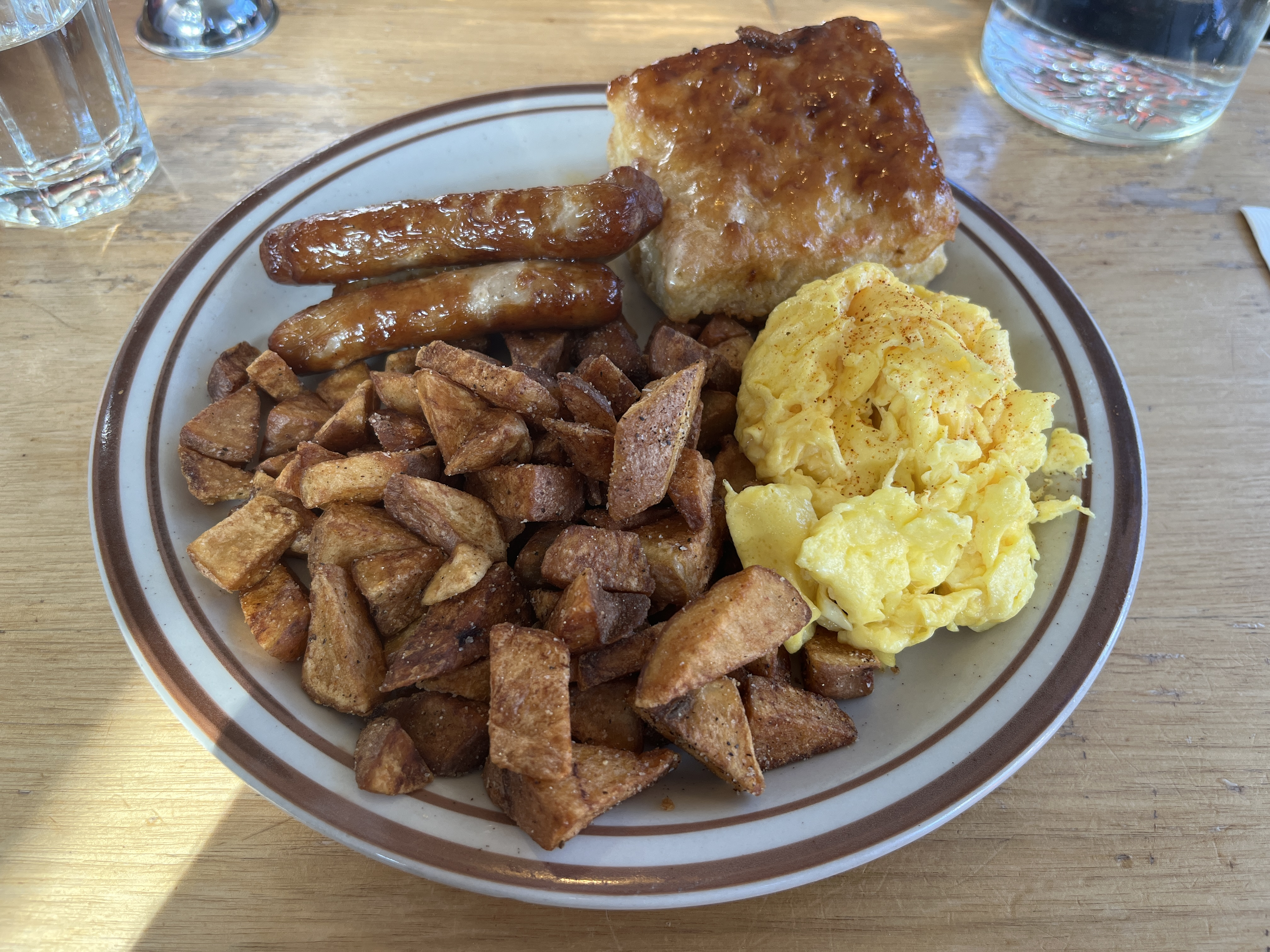
The Fat's Breakfast with two scrambled eggs, four sausage links, breakfast potatoes, and a honey butter biscuit, in 2023

The restaurant launched weekend brunch in December 2015. In 2016, Charles Mudede of The Stranger described Fat's as "a picture of racial diversity" with "as many blacks as there were Asians and whites". He wrote, "For once, a new place had opened in the Central District that did not have the air, the appearance, the stigma of gentrification." Mudede applauded Lalario's efforts, and said:

Lalario could have opened in the space on Martin Luther King Jr. Way and made it a tapas bar and charged a lot of money for very small plates... But what he did instead was simply work with the history of the location, and he also hired people of color... So though the place is new, and the owner is white, there is a feeling of continuity.

Crespinel retouched the mural of Martin Luther King Jr. when Fat's replaced Catfish Corner. The painting was vandalized in 2022, on Martin Luther King Jr. Day. The community raised $18,000 to restore the mural, and Crespinel traveled from Mexico to repaint the artwork for a third time.

== Reception ==
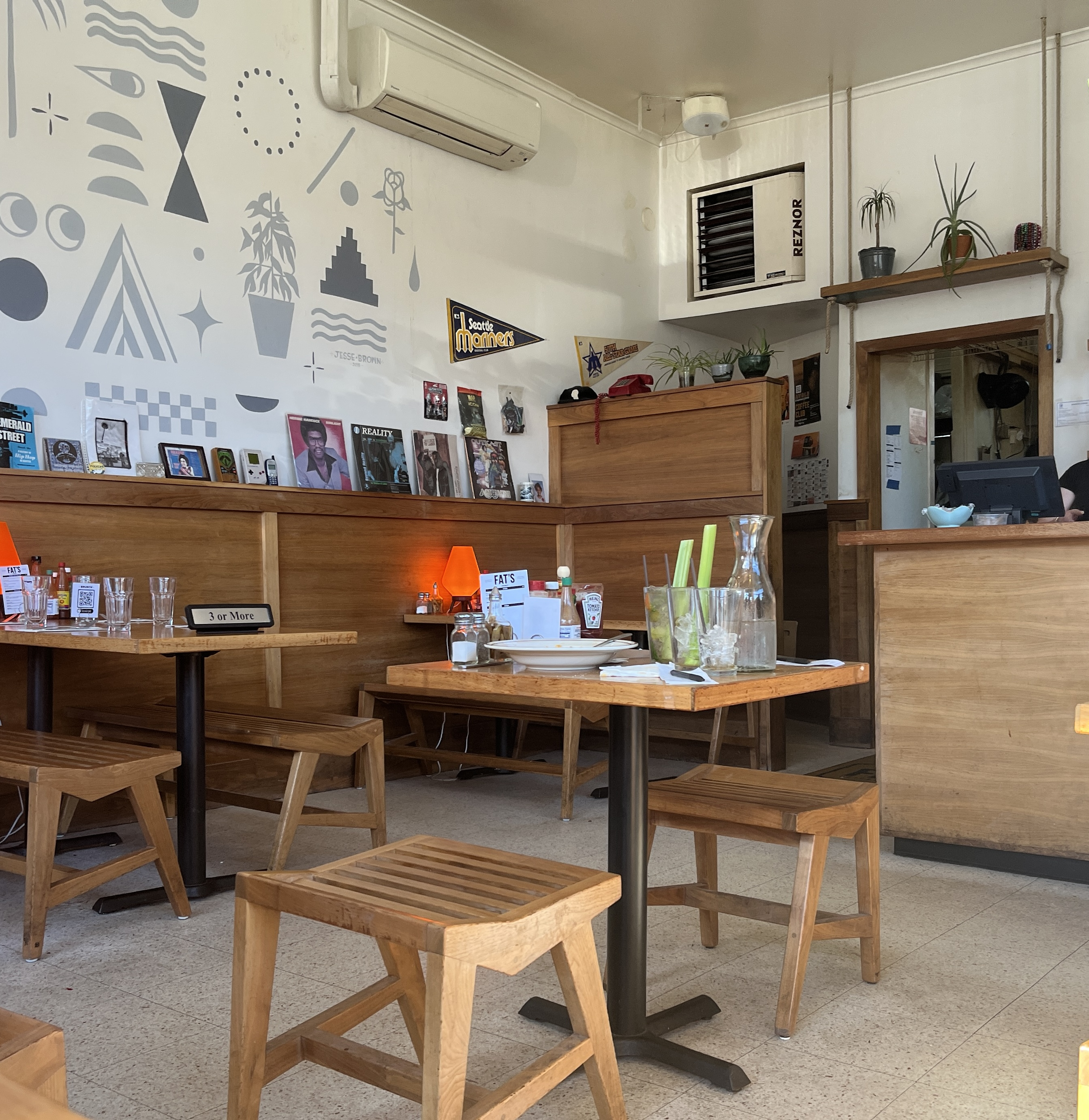
The restaurant's interior, 2023

Condé Nast Traveler says Fat's has "the best biscuits in town". In his review for The Stranger, Charles Mudede noted the restaurant's popularity and called the food "great and affordable". The newspaper said Fat's had Seattle's best fried chicken in 2017. Jake Uitti wrote, "This was a surprise, but well earned. The inviting nature of the spot coupled with the excellent service and delicious chicken garnered Fat's a near-perfect score." The Stranger also included Fat's in a 2018 overview of the city's best Southern restaurants. Christina Ausley included the restaurant in Seattle Post-Intelligencer's 2019 overview of the city's 15 busiest brunches, and Seattle Metropolitan included Fat's in a 2023 list of the city's best restaurants for lunch.

In 2016, Thrillist's Naomi Tomky called Fat's one of the Central District's "essential" restaurants. The website's Emma Banks and Bradley Foster included the business in a 2022 overview of Seattle's "absolute best" brunches. In 2022, Jade Yamazaki Stewart included Fat's in Eater Seattle's list of 17 eateries in the metropolitan area with "knockout" fried chicken, and she and Megan Hill included the business in an overview of 15 "great" Central District eateries. Stewart and Sophie Grossman also included Fat's in a 2023 list of Seattle's "most essential" brunches.

== See also ==
- List of Black-owned restaurants
- List of Cajun restaurants
- List of New American restaurants
- List of restaurants in Seattle
- List of soul food restaurants
- List of Southern restaurants
