= Bridges Cafe =

Defunct restaurant in Portland, Oregon, U.S.

Bridges Cafe & Catering

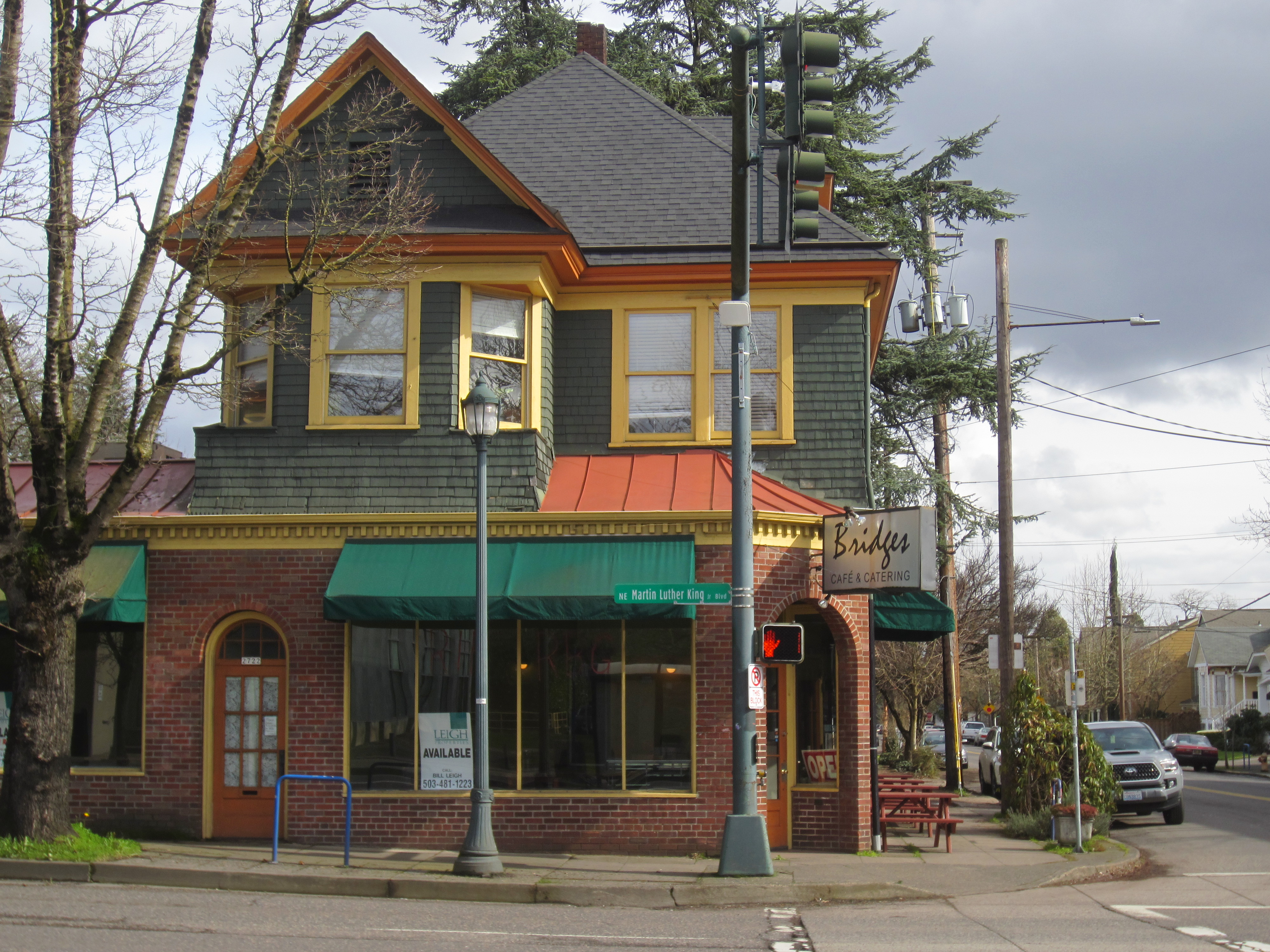
- The restaurant's exterior in February 2021, after closing in 2020
- Interactive map of Bridges Cafe & Catering

Restaurant information
- Established: 1994
- Closed: November 15, 2020
- Owners: Tom and Laura Lane-Ruckman
- Previous owner: Bridget Bayer
- Food type: Southern; Tex-Mex
- Location: 2716 Northeast Martin Luther King Jr. Boulevard, Portland, Multnomah, Oregon, 97212, United States
- Coordinates: 45.5422°N 122.6613°W
- Seating capacity: 30–60

Bridges Cafe & Catering was a restaurant and catering service in Portland, Oregon, United States. Established in 1994, the cafe was later purchased by Tom and Laura Lane-Ruckman, who continued to operate the business until the economic impact of the COVID-19 pandemic forced a closure in November 2020. The restaurant served Southern and Tex-Mex cuisine and had earned more than half of its revenue from catering. Considered a neighborhood favorite, the interior featured a small dining room, mosaic tiled tables, and artworks by various artists on the walls depicting bridges. The cafe was most known for its grits, its longtime server called "Phreddie", and for supporting local groups.

== Description ==
Bridges Cafe was located at the intersection of Knott Street and Martin Luther King (MLK) Jr. Boulevard in the northeast Portland section of the Eliot neighborhood. The interior featured a small dining room with mosaic tiled tables. On the walls were graphics of bridges by local artist Mike Beard and others, who created artworks and asked to have them added to the collection. In 1999, Natasha Nowakowski of the Portland Business Journal said the cafe was "artistically decorated with colorful walls and funky dining tables", serving as a space "where regulars come to congregate over early morning coffee or a mid-afternoon lunch". She also described Bridges as a "popular hangout for new and old residents in the area" with strong community support. In 2021, Eater Portland's Brooke Jackson-Glidden described the restaurant as a "casual and quaint haunt" and "a neighborhood favorite".

The Southern and Tex-Mex menu included breakfast burritos, catfish hash, Eggs Benedict, grits, gumbo, omelets, and scrambles. The corned beef hash had hollandaise sauce and caramelized onions and peppers, and was served alongside potato wedges. Bridges also served spinach and cheese biscuits as well as chicken and sun-dried tomato pesto. Lunch options included salads and sandwiches. Additionally, there were entrees with popular culture references, such as the Arturo Bandini, a variation of Eggs Benedict with poached eggs, prosciutto, spinach, and a hollandaise with basil, parsley, rosemary, and thyme, all served on Tuscan white bean cakes. The Belgian waffle was served with organic maple syrup and optional strawberry compote. The drink menu included coffee, tea, orange and grapefruit juice, Bloody Marys, and mimosas. In 2012, Jake Ten Pas of The Oregonian described the menu as "down-South-meets-Northwest breakfast fixings".

Bridges operated from 7:00 am–2:00 pm on weekdays and from 8:00 am–3:00 pm on weekends, as of 2012.

== History ==
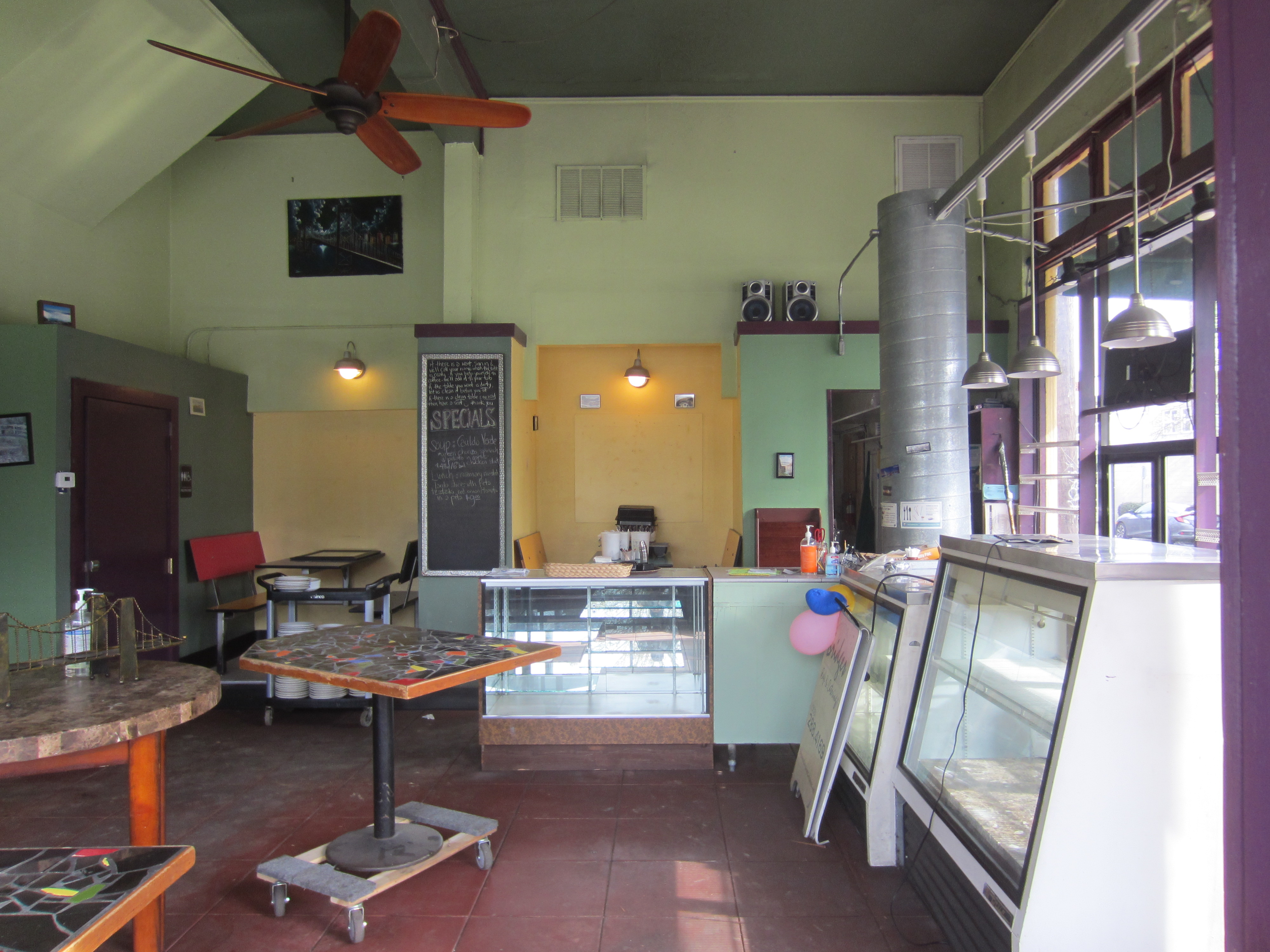
The restaurant's interior in 2021, after closing in 2020

Bridget Bayer opened Bridges in 1994 and owned the business until at least September 1999. She bartered with electricians and plumbers to improve the building, which had no electricity or plumbing when she first leased it. She also helped start events such as the Dog Days of Summer and Saturday Stroll to encourage community activity by co-founding the North/Northeast Business Association's Martin Luther King Jr. Good Ol' Days Merchant Society. John Balzar of the Los Angeles Times described Bayer as someone "with a growing regional reputation for her skill as a beer chef". She hosted brewer's dinners each month, incorporating beer into dressings and sauces as well as entrees such as baked paella and chili con carne. In 1999, Nowakowski said the cafe "has become a nerve center of economic development along MLK's three-mile strip" and had "proven to be the right antidote for the once-decaying neighborhood". The restaurant was one of only two along an approximately 2-mile (3.2 km) stretch of MLK Jr. Boulevard at the time and hosted an average of 200 customers per weekend. According to Bayer, sales increased by 10 percent annually, but the business was "only marginally profitable" due to limited seating capacity. The interior accommodated 30 seats and outdoor seating doubled total capacity when weather allowed.

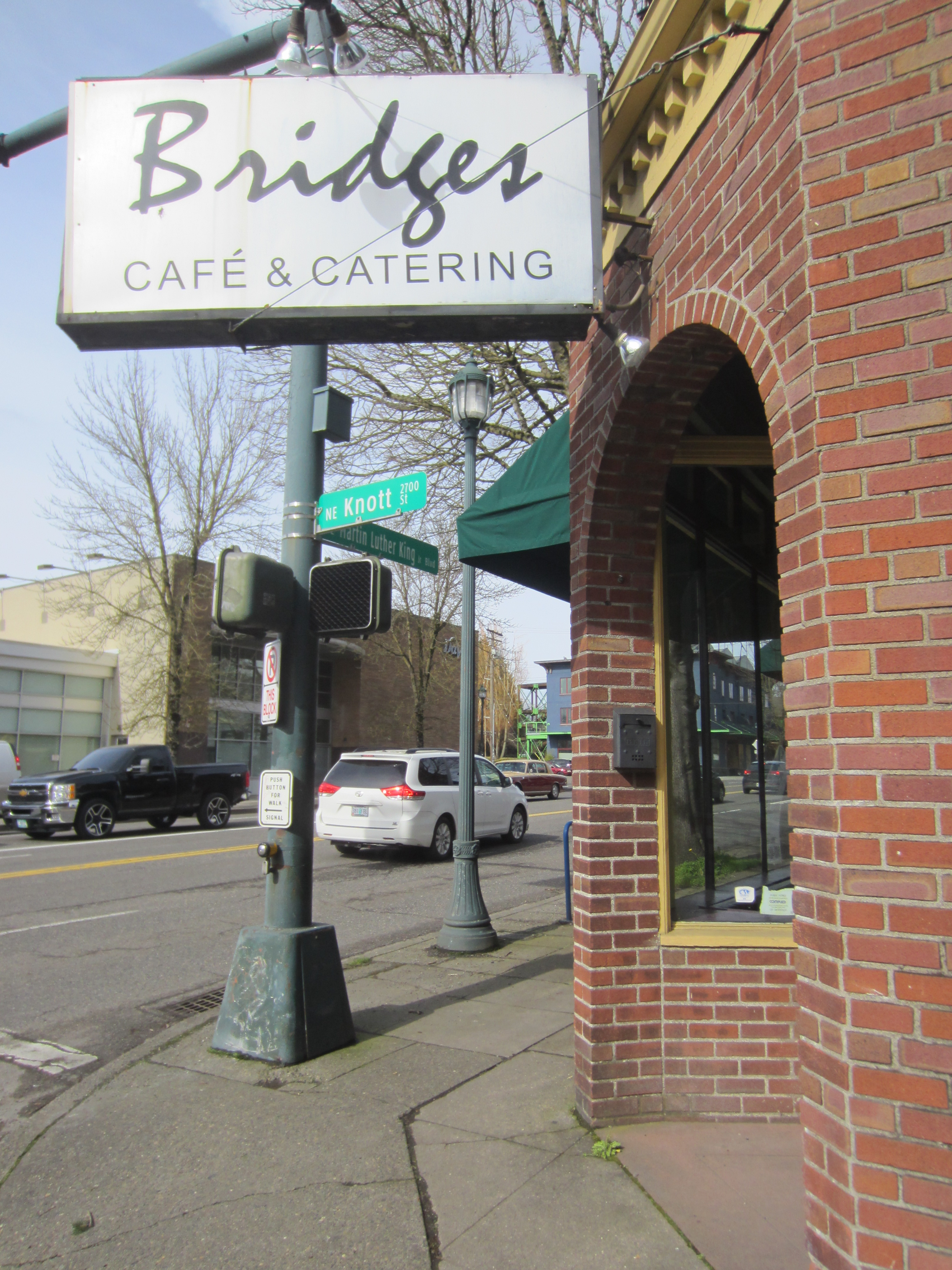
Sign outside the front entrance, February 2021

To generate additional income, Bayer began selling three dip varieties, including roasted-vegetable caponata, in the late 1990s. In 1999, she confirmed plans to sell the restaurant and embark on a wholesale-food business for her dips. Tom and Laura Lane-Ruckman purchased Bridges. Laura served as general manager of the cafe. The duo's "first order of business was to throw out the cans and start making everything from scratch", according to Pas. More than half of the restaurant's revenue was generated from catering. According to the Portland Mercury's Abe Asher, the Lane-Ruckmans "[established] Bridges as a favorite even as the neighborhood gentrified".

A female server called "Phreddie" who worked at Bridges for fifteen years has been described as the cafe's "most recognizable figure". The business supported local groups such as Red Dress PDX, which supports queer youth and people living with HIV/AIDS, as well as unions including the Local 503 chapter of the Service Employees International Union and Multnomah County's HIV Services Planning Council. Bridges also hosted a series of successful pop-ups.

During the COVID-19 pandemic, Bridges laid off all but three employees and continued operating as a takeout service. In June, when restaurants had permission to operate, Lane-Ruckman expanded the dining room to allow socially distanced indoor dining. The business fell behind on rent, however, and the economic impact of the pandemic forced Bridges to close permanently on Sunday, November 15, 2020. An announcement of the closure said, "Thank you to all of you who graced us with your business over the years, and to all of you that made our catering business thrive (back in the days when that was possible) ... Good luck and stay safe." Owners and staff reminisced over champagne on the last day.

== Reception ==
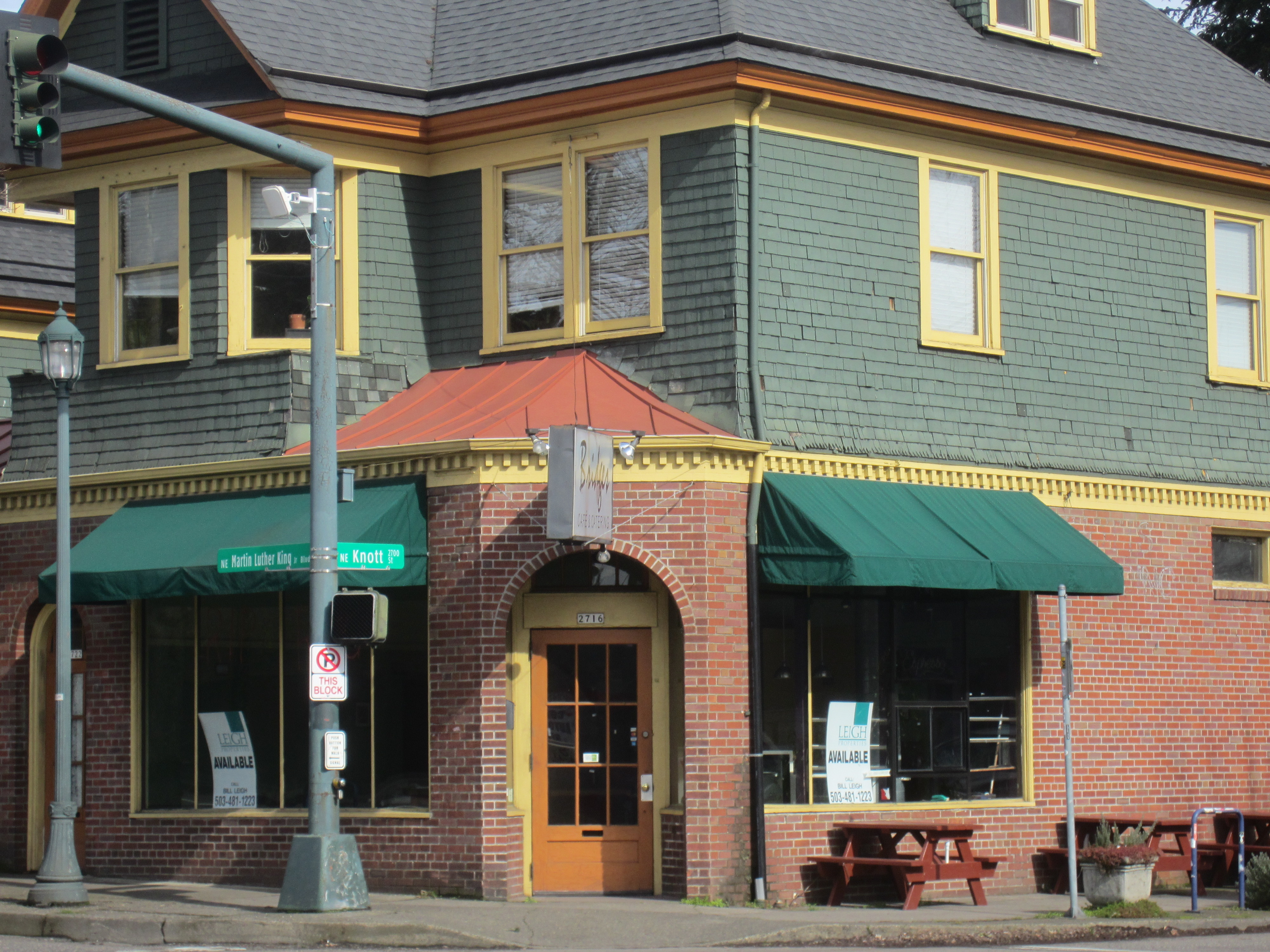
Front entrance, 2021

In 2005, The Oregonian's Grant Butler wrote, "A few years ago, this longtime restaurant underwent some changes that turned it into a rock-solid breakfast spot, with strict attention paid to the smallest details – like the coffee, which they roast themselves from organic beans. Omelets are standouts, paired with crisp potato wedges and thick slices of poppy seed-crusted toast. On weekends the wait can be lengthy. Good thing that Nike Outlet Store is right across the street." Pas said Bridges was "a little spendy for breakfast" and recommended the "amazing" grits (especially with cheese for an additional $1). He wrote in 2012, "Bridges gets loud during brunch, and it's a small space, which means close quarters. But the staff does a good job of moving people through, so you likely won't have to wait too long."

In 2019, The Oregonian's Lizzy Acker ranked Bridges number 16 on her list of the city's 25 best corned beef hashes, in which she said the hollandaise and vegetables were "heavy-handed". She called the tiled tables a "standout feature" and opined, "Bridges offers a cute corner location steps across Knott Street from Nike's factory outlet. It's a nice place for a bite, but next time, we'll opt for their always reliable catfish hash where hollandaise sauce makes more sense." Bridges was most known for its grits, according to Asher, who called the "beloved" cafe a "pillar" of the neighborhood and said the small dining room "encouraged diners at separate tables to get to know one another, its accessibility, and its reliability. Many felt like the cafe was an extension of their homes."

In articles about the pandemic's impact of the city's restaurant scene, Karen Brooks of Portland Monthly called Bridges a "beloved neighborhood anchor" and Michael Russell of The Oregonian described the cafe as a "long-running brunch favorite".

== See also ==
- Impact of the COVID-19 pandemic on the restaurant industry in the United States
- List of Southern restaurants
- List of Tex-Mex restaurants
