= List of Southern restaurants =

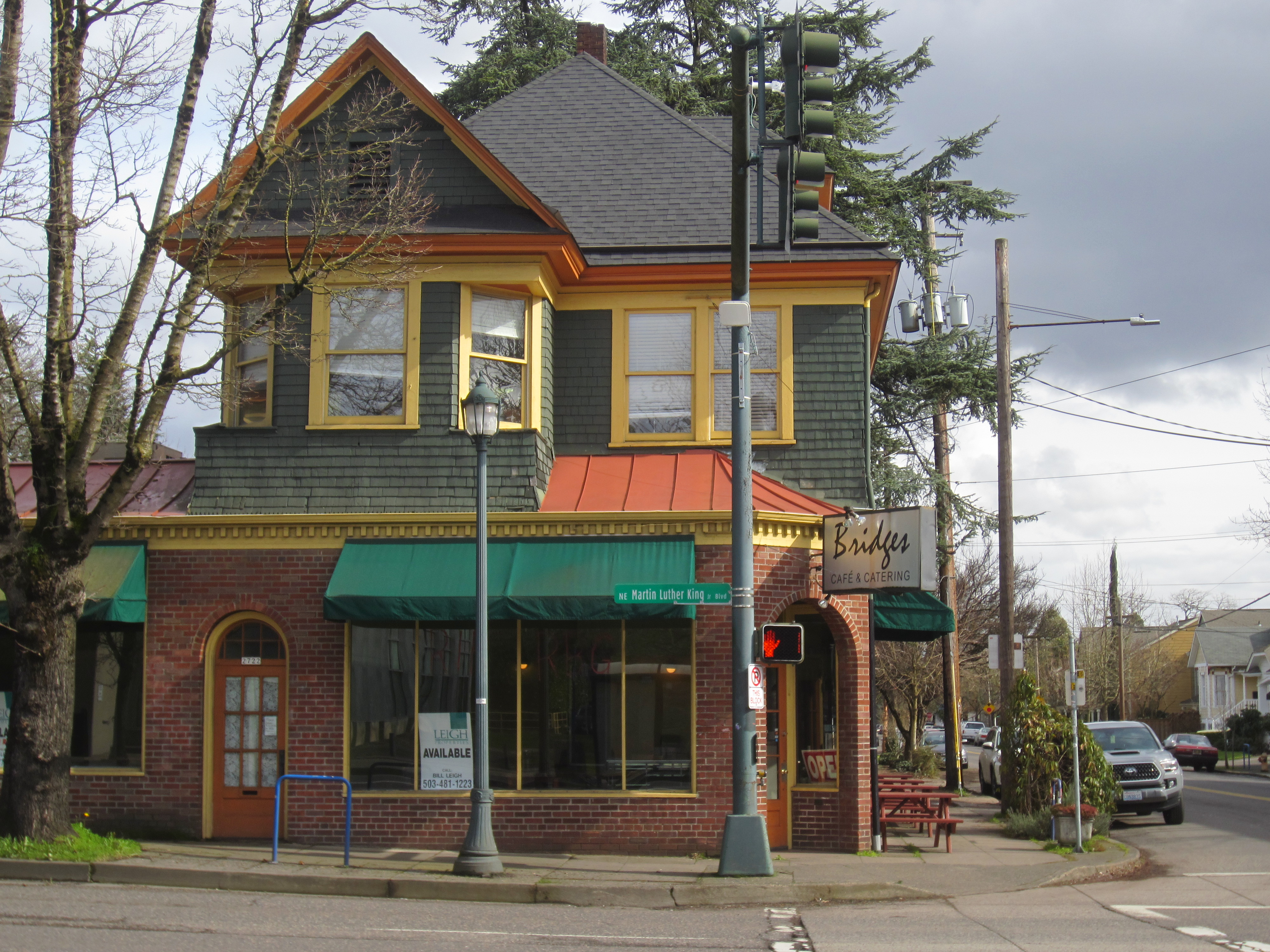
Bridges Cafe, Portland, Oregon

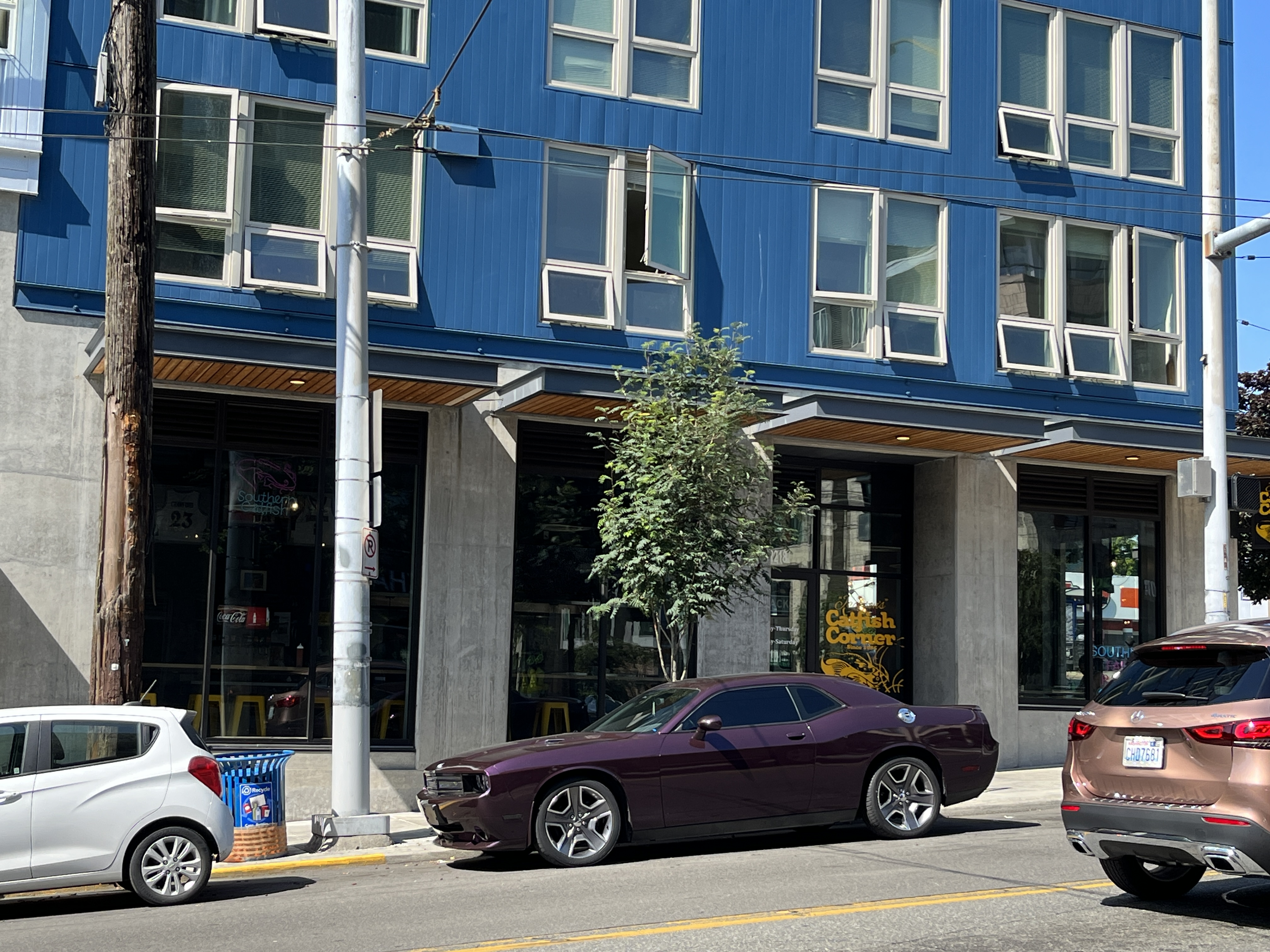
Jackson's Catfish Corner, Seattle, Washington

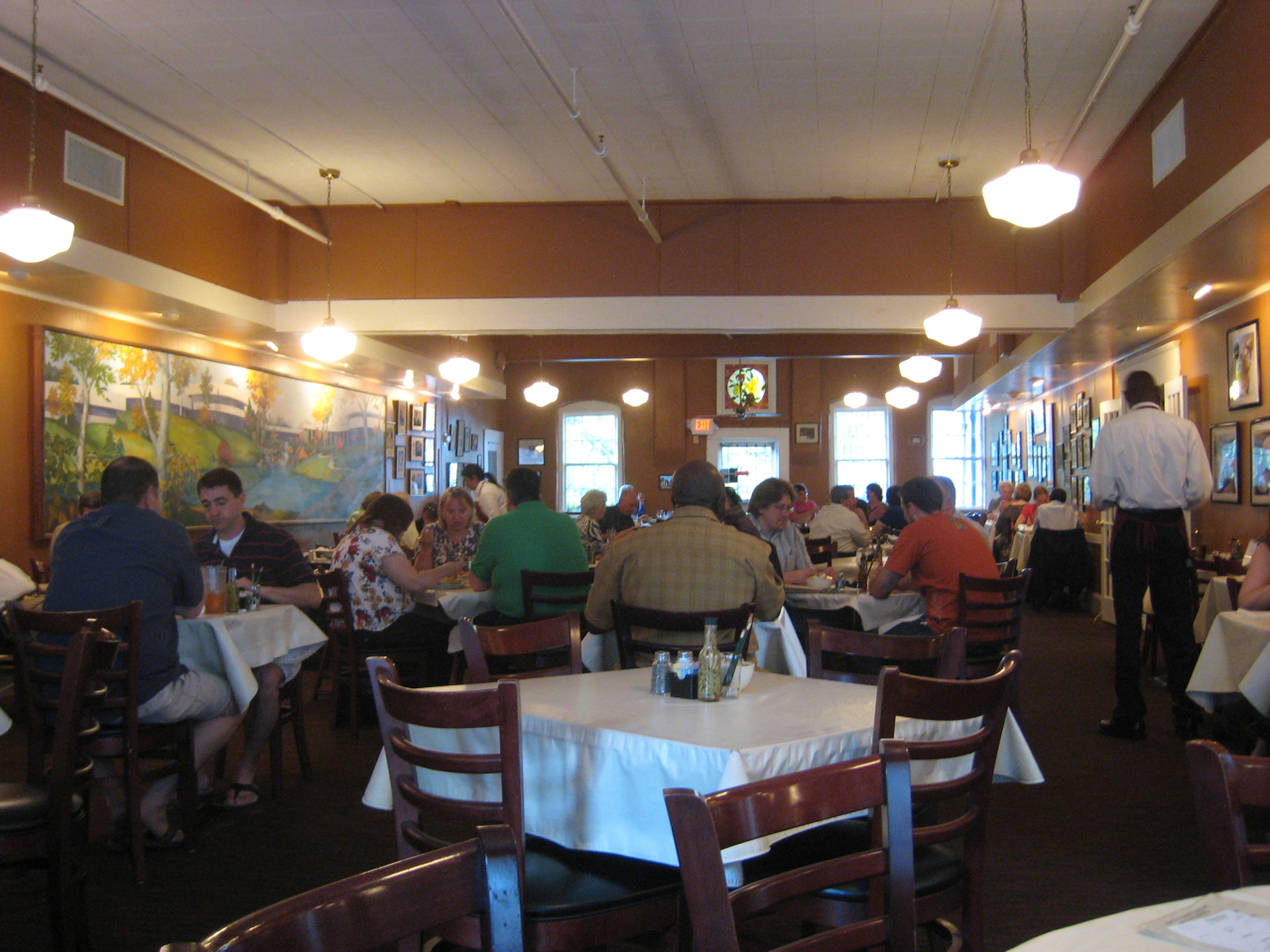
Mary Mac's Tea Room, Atlanta, Georgia

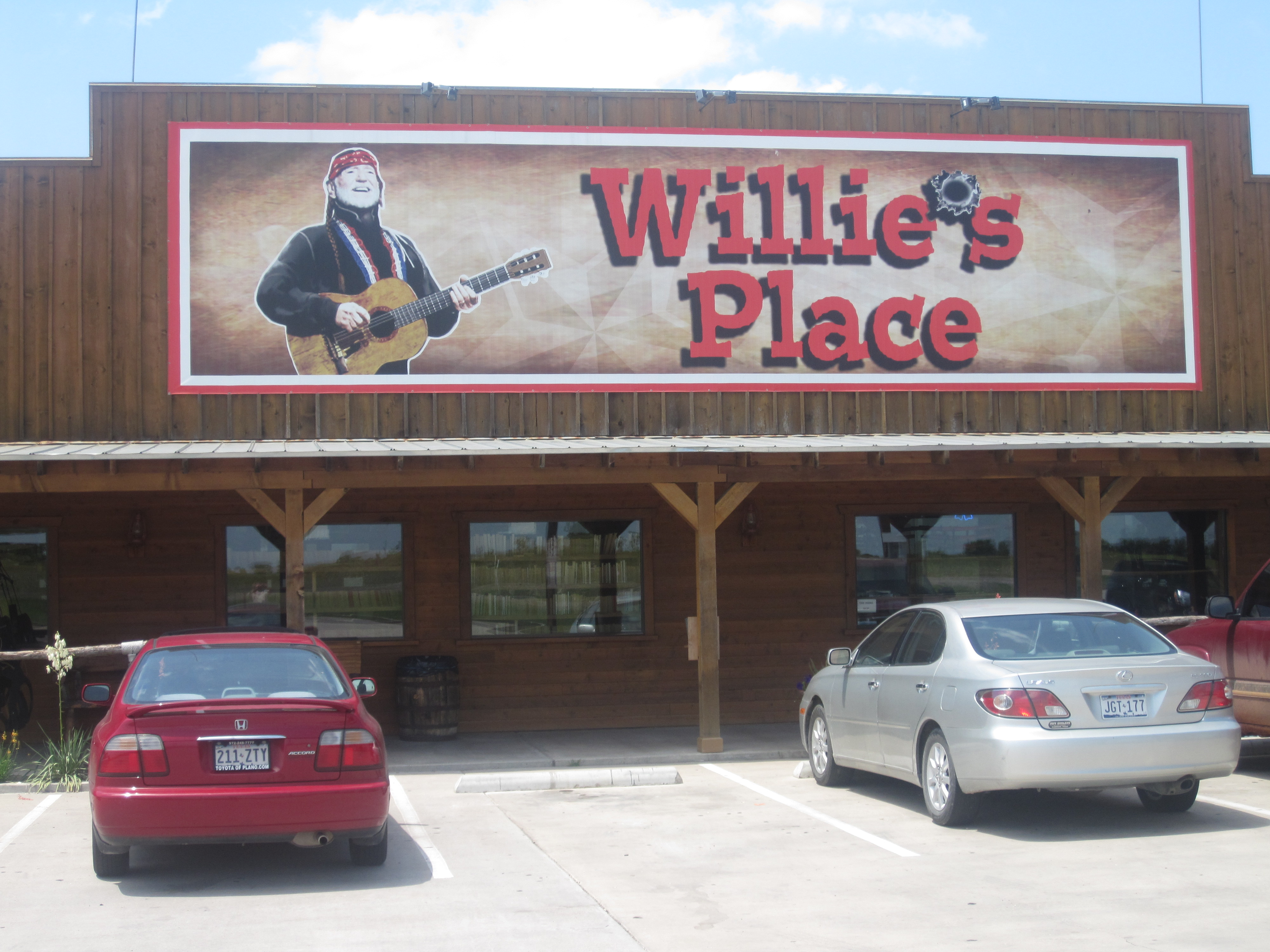
Willie's Place, Carl's Corner, Texas

Following is a list of notable restaurants known for serving cuisine of the Southern United States:

- Acadia: A New Orleans Bistro, Portland, Oregon, U.S.
- Alta Adams, Los Angeles, California
- Arnold's Country Kitchen, Nashville, Tennessee
- Baes Fried Chicken, Portland, Oregon
- Big Spring Cafe, Huntsville, Alabama
- Biscuit Bitch, Seattle
- Bomb Biscuits, Atlanta
- Bridges Cafe (1994–2020), Portland, Oregon
- The Bright Star, Bessemer, Alabama
- Brochu's Family Tradition, Savannah, Georgia
- Bully's Restaurant, Jackson, Mississippi
- The Busy Bee Café, Atlanta, Georgia
- Café Camellia, New York City
- The Chastain, Atlanta, Georgia
- Corinne's Place, Camden, New Jersey
- The Country Cat, Portland, Oregon
- Country Cookin
- Cracker Barrel
- Crook's Corner (1982–2021), Chapel Hill, North Carolina
- Delta Cafe (1995), Portland, Oregon
- Dirty Lettuce (2020), Portland, Oregon
- Erica's Soul Food (2020), Portland, Oregon
- Fat's Chicken and Waffles, Seattle
- Florence's Restaurant, Oklahoma City
- Gatlin's Fins & Feathers, Houston, Texas
- Georgia Brown's, Washington, D.C.
- Grits n' Gravy, Portland, Oregon
- Hatchet Hall, Los Angeles
- Huckleberry's Breakfast & Lunch
- Jackson's Catfish Corner, Seattle
- JuneBaby, Seattle
- Lambert's Cafe
- Lancaster Smokehouse, Kitchener, Ontario, Canada
- Le Bistro Montage Ala Cart
- Mary Mac's Tea Room
- Miller's Seawall Grill, Galveston, Texas
- Miss Delta, Portland, Oregon
- Nacheaux, West Linn, Oregon (previously Portland)
- Screen Door, Portland, Oregon
- Smithfields Restaurant and Bar, Ashland, Oregon
- Upperline Restaurant, New Orleans, Louisiana
- Willie's Place, Carl's Corner, Texas
- Yardbird Southern Table & Bar
- Yonder (2019–2022), Portland, Oregon
