= Yonder (restaurant) =

Defunct restaurant in Portland, Oregon, U.S.

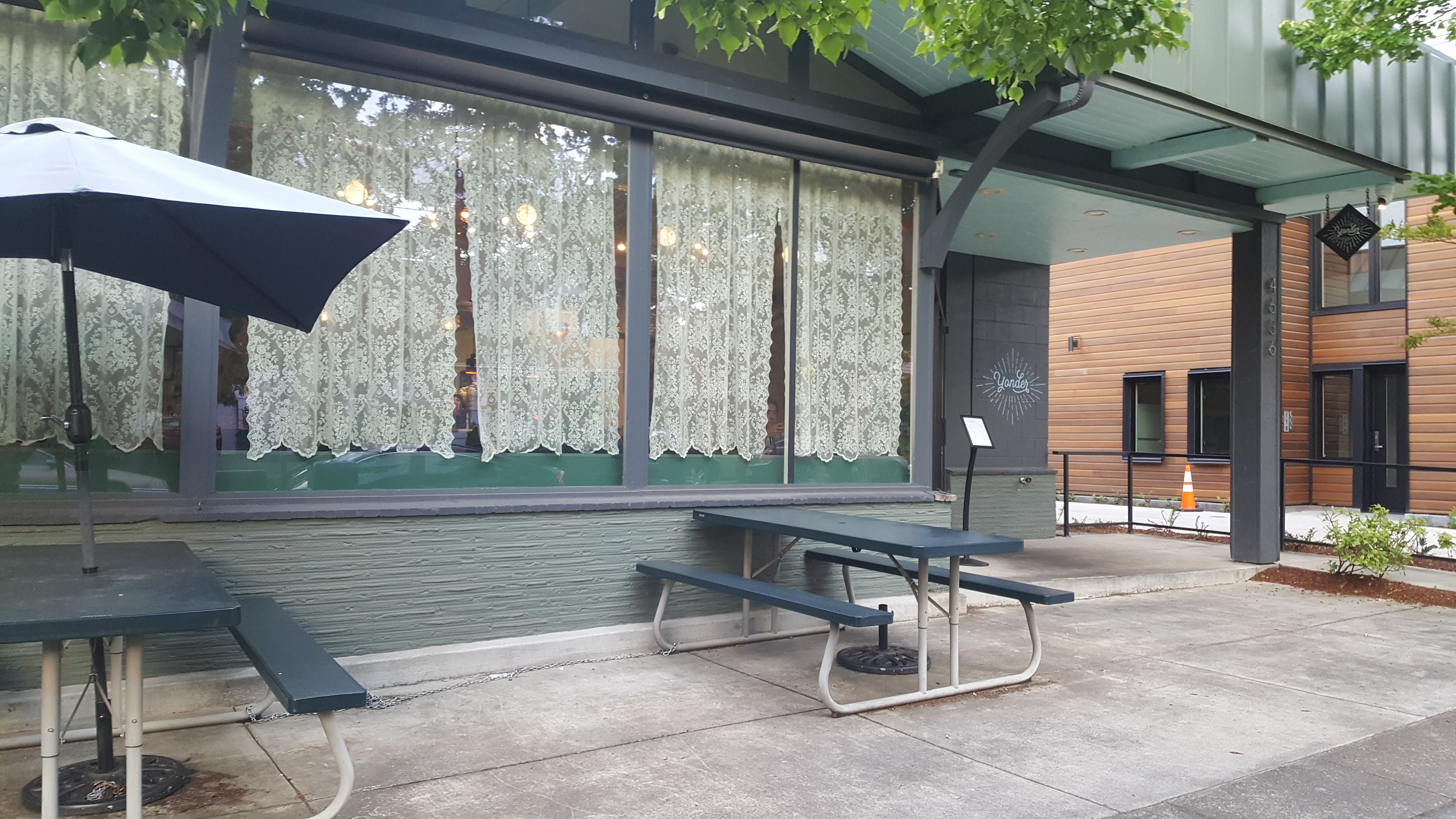
- The restaurant's exterior in 2022
- Interactive map of Yonder

Restaurant information
- Established: 2019
- Closed: June 26, 2022
- Food type: Southern
- Location: 4636 Northeast 42nd Avenue, Portland, Multnomah, Oregon, 97218, United States
- Coordinates: 45°33′26″N 122°37′13″W
- Website: yonderpdx.com

Yonder was a Southern restaurant in Portland, Oregon. Chef Maya Lovelace opened Yonder in northeast Portland's Cully neighborhood in 2019. The business was named one of the city's ten best new restaurants of 2019 by The Oregonian and was featured on an episode of the Food Network's Diners, Drive-Ins and Dives in 2020. Yonder closed on June 26, 2022, when Lovelace converted the space into Hissyfit.

== Description ==
The fast casual restaurant Yonder served Southern cuisine in northeast Portland's Cully neighborhood. The menu focused on fried chicken and also included cornmeal-fried catfish and grilled pimento cheese sandwiches; sides included bacon-braised collard greens, pimento macaroni and cheese, and bread-and-butter zucchini pickles.

== History ==
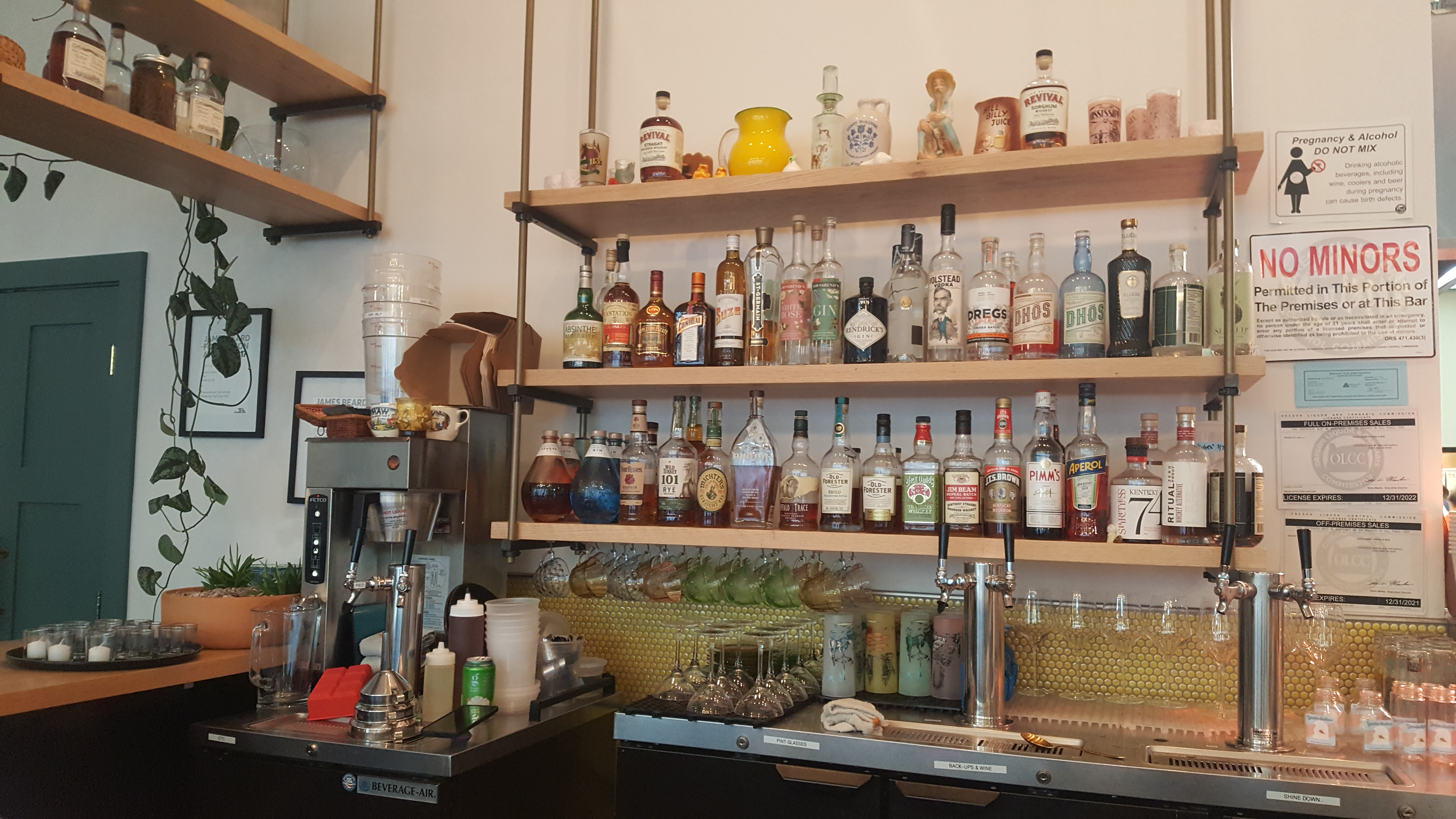
The restaurant's interior in 2022

Yonder opened in 2019, in a Jane Dough building space which previously housed Delphina's Bakery. The restaurant began offering weekend brunch service in August. In 2020, Yonder was featured on the tenth episode ("Chicken and Pie") of the 32nd season of the Food Network's Diners, Drive-Ins and Dives. The restaurant also hosted pop-up dinners.

In 2022, chef Maya Lovelace announced plans to close Yonder on June 26 and "transition" into Hissyfit. Eater Portland attributed the closure to the COVID-19 pandemic. Lovelace said:

The last couple of years have been intensely difficult for restaurants in Portland and across the country. We feel so lucky to have weathered the storm thanks to the support of our wonderful customers and community, but now it’s time for us to focus on something new. This summer we are shaking things up to make space for more creative freedom and more fun, cooking for the joy of it, and letting our unfettered whims carry us wherever they may go.

One month after Hissyfit's July opening, Lovelace announced the restaurant's permanent closure and her departure from the Portland restaurant industry.

== Reception ==
Michael Russell included Yonder in The Oregonian's list of "Portland's 10 best new restaurants of 2019". The restaurant has appeared in multiple Eater Portland lists, including ones for "impressive cocktails", "buzziest" new breakfasts and brunches, "top-notch" macaroni and cheese, "serious" cornbread, and "outstanding" fried chicken sandwiches.

== See also ==
- COVID-19 pandemic in Portland, Oregon
- Impact of the COVID-19 pandemic on the restaurant industry in the United States
- List of Diners, Drive-Ins and Dives episodes
- List of Southern restaurants
