= Smithfields (Ashland, Oregon) =

Pair of restaurants in Ashland, Oregon, U.S.

- Interactive map of Smithfields

Restaurant information
- Location: Smithfields Restaurant and Bar: 36 S 2nd Street; Smithfields Pub and Pies: 23 S 2nd Street, Ashland, Jackson, Oregon, 97520, United States
- Coordinates: 42°11′40.8″N 122°42′42.3″W

Smithfields refers to two related businesses in Ashland, Oregon, United States: Smithfields Restaurant and Bar and Smithfields Pub and Pies.

== Description and history ==
Smithfields is co-owned by British chef Neil Clooney and Dee Vallentyne. The two commissioned artist Sarah F. Burns to create three oil paintings depicting dead animals for the restaurant's interior in 2012.

Smithfields Restaurant and Bar's menu includes Southern cuisine options such as baked beans, brisket, collards, and fried chicken. The farm-to-table restaurant has been described as a "meta mecca" with a "breezy atmosphere, cheery packed bar and local focus", and a "casual steakhouse with thoughtful attention to detail".

== Reception ==
Clooney was named Best Chef for his work at Smithfields by readers of Southern Oregon magazine in 2015.

== See also ==
- List of Southern restaurants
