= Brochu's Family Tradition =

Restaurant in Savannah, Georgia, U.S.

- Interactive map of Brochu's Family Tradition

Restaurant information
- Food type: Southern
- Location: 2400 Bull Street, Savannah, Georgia, United States
- Coordinates: 32°3′16″N 81°6′2.5″W
- Website: brochusfamilytradition.com

Brochu's Family Tradition is a Southern restaurant in Savannah, Georgia. The restaurant, at 2400 Bull Street, was established in December 2022 by Andrew Brochu and his wife, Sophie. It was included in The New York Times's 2023 list of the 50 best restaurants in the United States.

== See also ==
- List of Southern restaurants
