= Willie's Place =

Former truck stop in Carl's Corner, Texas

External videos
- Willie's Place at Carl's Corner - Willie Nelson interview with Erica Harpold

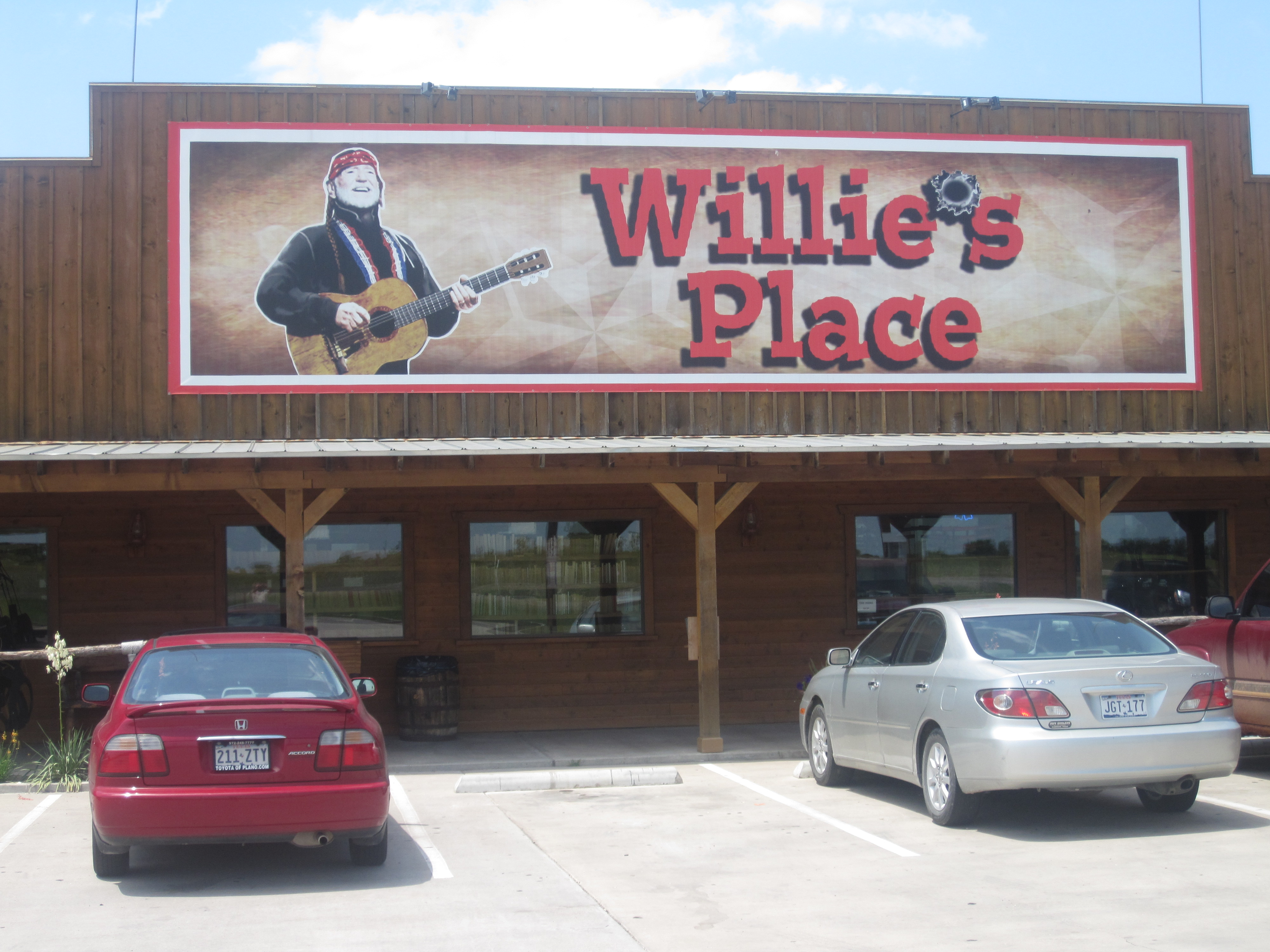
Willie's Place in 2010. The apostrophe in the sign is replaced with an image of a bullet hole.

Willie's Place was a 15 acres (6.1 ha) truck stop and biodiesel processing plant located in Carl's Corner, Texas that was opened in 2005 and named after Willie Nelson. The facility was originally built circa 1980 by Carl Cornelius and named Carl's Corner. Willie's Place was closed for a time and then reopened in 2008 after a significant expansion. Willie's Place had a gas station that was the first to sell Willie Nelson Biodiesel brand biodiesel, a restaurant that specialized in Southern cuisine, a convenience store and a 750-seat concert theater for performances. The theater had a bar and a 1,000 square feet (93 m^{2}) dance floor, and various touring country western bands would perform there.

Willie Nelson also occasionally visited the site, and occasionally performed. The establishment also had a "display of rare country music memorabilia", along with Willie Nelson memorabilia. Willie's Place had about 80 employees.

== Biodiesel processing plant ==
The processing plant at Willie's Place processed over two million gallons of biodiesel annually.

== Closure ==
Willie's Place closed in 2011 after a loan default occurred, which led to foreclosure and bankruptcy. It was later converted into a truck stop.

== See also ==
- List of Southern restaurants
- Willie's Roadhouse – a channel on the Sirius XM Radio that specializes in playing traditional country music, as well as some older country hit songs
