= Big Spring Cafe =

Diner in Huntsville, Alabama, U.S.

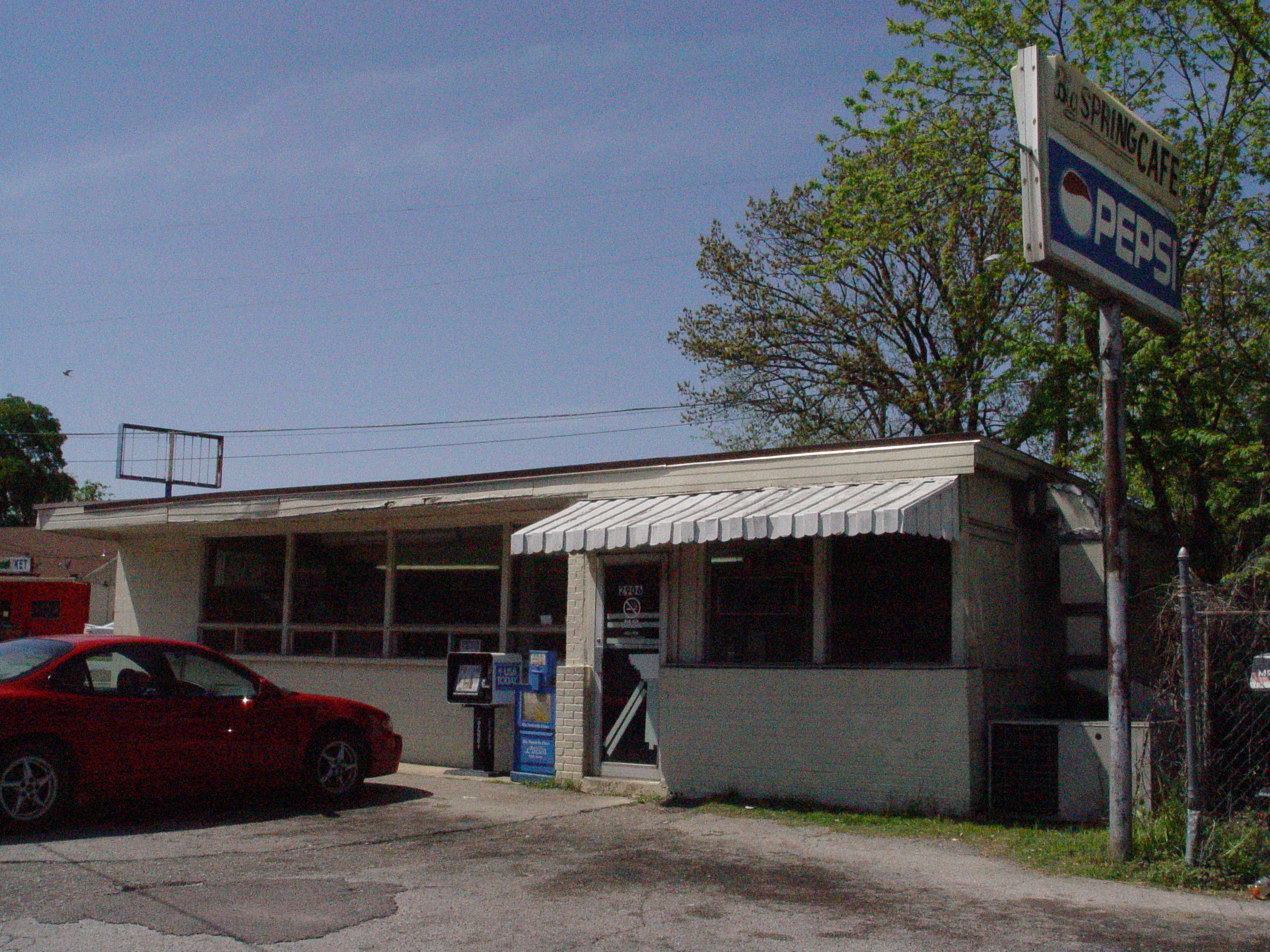
- Big Spring Cafe in April 2011
- Interactive map of Big Spring Cafe

Restaurant information
- Established: 1922; 104 years ago
- Owner: Pam Milam
- Food type: Diner
- Dress code: Casual
- Location: 3507 Governors Drive SW, Huntsville, Madison, Alabama, 35805-3723, United States
- Coordinates: 34.720486°N 86.604806°W
- Seating capacity: 2 tables, 16 bar stools
- Reservations: No

Big Spring Cafe is a diner in Huntsville, Alabama. It opened in 1922, and is the oldest restaurant in the city. It is often noted as a landmark in the city and as one of Huntsville's "signature" restaurants. When the original location opened, it served only hamburgers consisting of ground beef, onions, mustard and salt on a roll.

== History ==
The original Big Spring Cafe opened in 1922 at 119 Jefferson Street in Huntsville, Alabama. It was located in a railroad boxcar near the Big Spring Canal. It then moved to 115 Gallatin Street (where the Von Braun Center parking garage now stands), and then to Governors Drive in 1970. This location provided 16 bar stools at the counter and two long tables for customers. The family relocated the diner to a newly constructed building about one-half mile west, but still on Governors Drive in April, 2017.

Troy Baucom opened the original location in downtown Huntsville in Spring 1922. The restaurant was sold to Hazel Beene in 1946 and, as business left the downtown core for the Memorial Parkway corridor, joined the exodus in 1970. Two years later, Beene turned the restaurant over to her sister and brother-in-law, Doris and Howard Cowley. The Cowleys operated Big Spring Cafe until selling it to their daughter, Pam Milam, in 1992. Citing the age and condition of the current building, Milam announced in March 2008 that she planned to relocate Big Spring Cafe just west on Governors Drive, in "a year or so", taking care to replicate the interior of the cafe in the new location. The move finally happened in April, 2017.

== Cuisine ==
When the original location opened in 1928, it served only hamburgers consisting of ground beef, salt, mustard, and onions on a roll. The current location, tucked between a meat market and a bait shop, offers both breakfast and lunch six days a week and is closed on Sundays. The menu now includes diner staples including hamburgers, hot dogs, and no-bean chili plus Southern specialties like Brunswick stew, slaw dogs, and fried bologna biscuits. The diner has its own special language for ordering some items. For example, a "hamburger with cheese" is a ground beef patty with mustard and onions on a square bun while a "cheeseburger" is a ground beef patty plus lettuce, tomato, and mayonnaise on a round bun. A bowl with equal portions of chili and Brunswick stew is ordered as "half and half" while that mix with slightly more chili is a "60–40".

== See also ==
- List of hamburger restaurants
- List of Southern restaurants
