= The Bright Star =

Restaurant in Bessemer, Alabama, U.S.

- Interactive map of The Bright Star

Restaurant information
- Established: 1907
- Location: 304 19th Street North, Bessemer, Alabama, 35020, United States
- Coordinates: 33°24′9″N 86°57′13.5″W

The Bright Star is a restaurant in Bessemer, Alabama. It was named an America's Classic by the James Beard Foundation in 2010. In 2023 it was named the Best Local Restaurant in Alabama by Southern Living. It is the oldest restaurant in Alabama.

== Description ==
The Bright Star serves a menu called by the Beard Foundation "fusion, Greek meets Southern, as interpreted by African American cooks".

== History ==
The restaurant was founded in 1907 by Tom Bonduris, an immigrant from Greece. When it opened it had seating for 25, and eventually it expanded to over 300. The restaurant was owned by Bill and Pete Koikos in 1925. It was owned by Koikos and his sons Jim and Nick in 1968. In 2019 it was owned by Nick Koikos.

It is the oldest restaurant in Alabama.

== Recognition ==
In 2010 it was named an America's Classic by the James Beard Foundation. In 2023 Southern Living named it Alabama's Best Local Restaurant.

== See also ==
- List of Southern restaurants
