= Miller's Seawall Grill =

Restaurant in Galveston, Texas, U.S.

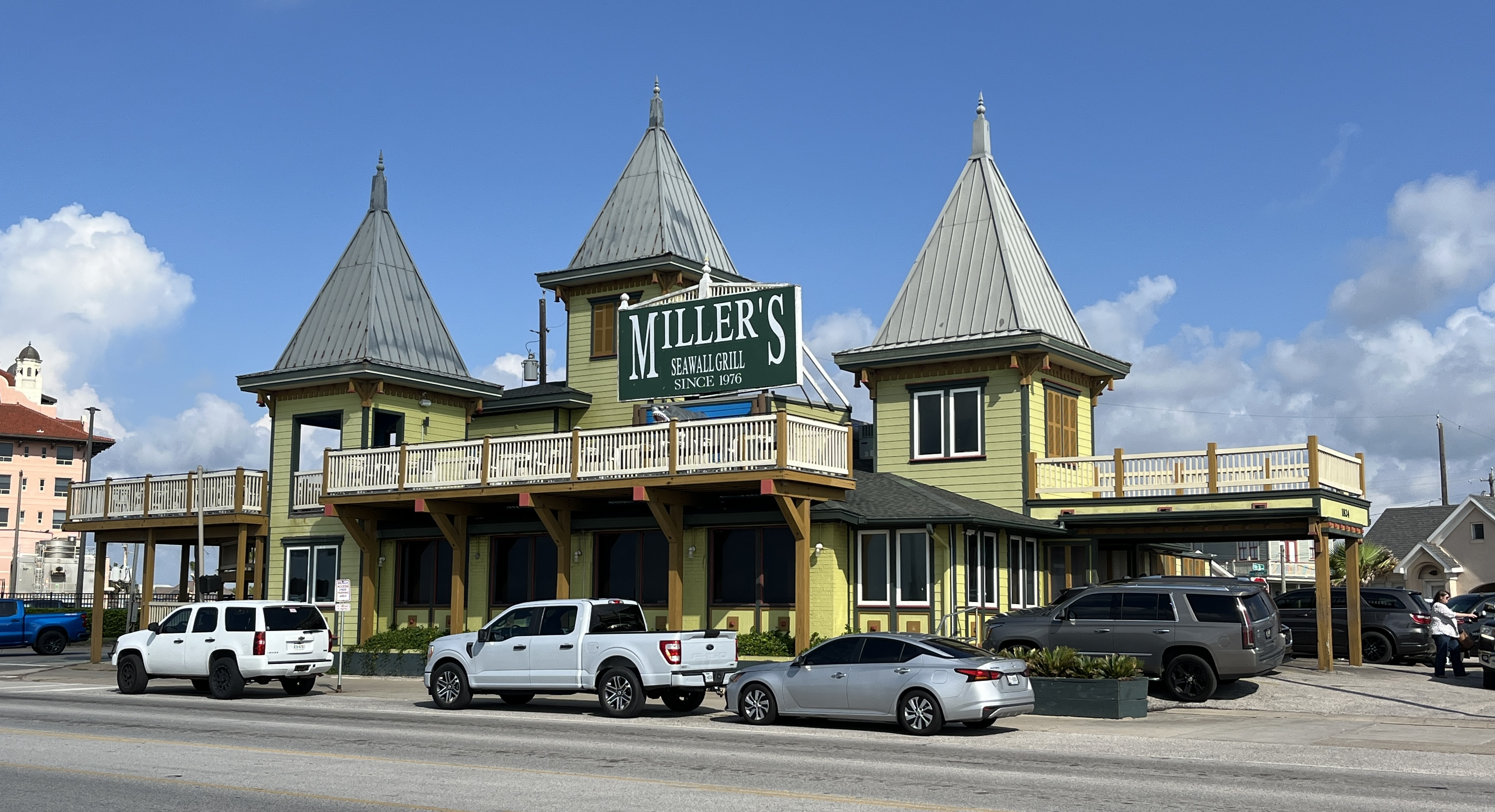
- The restaurant's exterior in 2024
- Interactive map of Miller's Seawall Grill

Restaurant information
- Established: 1976
- Food type: American; Southern
- Location: 1824 Seawall Boulevard, Galveston, Texas, 77550, United States
- Coordinates: 29°17′36″N 94°47′4″W
- Website: millersseawallgrillgalveston.com

Miller's Seawall Grill is a restaurant in Galveston, Texas.

== Description ==
The family-owned restaurant Miller's Seawall Grill operates in a yellow Victorian house on Seawall Boulevard in Galveston, Texas. The interior has dark wood and tiled floors.

Breakfast is served all day; options include Belgian waffles, chicken and waffles, Eggs Benedict, French toast, huevos rancheros, omelettes, and pancakes. The menu also includes chicken-fried steak, fish, grits, gumbo, hushpuppies, liver and onions, meatloaf, oysters, shrimp, and steak and eggs. Dessert options include a pecan brownie with chocolate ganache, pies, and Italian cream cake with amaretto orange peel.

The restaurant has a mural by artist Justin Lopez.

== History ==
Established in 1976, the restaurant has been owned by Donald Clark and David LeBouef since 2002. It caught fire in 2018.

== See also ==
- List of Southern restaurants
