= Bully's Restaurant =

Restaurant in Jackson, Mississippi

Coordinates: 32.3418°N 90.1979°W

Bully's Restaurant is a restaurant in Jackson, Mississippi. In 2016 it was named one of America's Classics by the James Beard Foundation. The restaurant is located on Livingston Road in Jackson, Mississippi.

== History ==
Ballery Tyrone Bully built the restaurant with his father; both of them are masons. The restaurant opened in 1982. It originally opened as a snack shop serving sandwiches to local factory workers.

== Menu ==
The restaurant focuses on Southern cuisine and soul food staples such as chitterlings, neckbones, oxtails, macaroni and cheese, and greens. The Beard Foundation said "This is back-of-the-range cooking without peer. " The 2021 Moon U.S. Civil Rights Trail called the food "some soul food hall-of-fame-style cooking".

== Recognition ==
In 2016 the restaurant was named one of America's Classics by the James Beard Foundation.

== See also ==
- List of Southern restaurants
