= Country Cookin =

American restaurant chain

Country Cookin'
- Company type: Restaurant
- Industry: Fast Casual
- Founded: 1981; 45 years ago in Roanoke, Virginia
- Founder: Roger Smith
- Defunct: October 18, 2020; 5 years ago
- Headquarters: Roanoke, Virginia, U.S.
- Products: Southern cuisine
- Website: Country Cookin

Country Cookin was a Virginia-based chain of casual dining restaurants featuring Southern cuisine with 14 locations throughout Virginia, mostly in Southwest Virginia, the Shenandoah Valley, and the U.S. 29 corridor. The first restaurant was opened by Roger Smith in Roanoke, Virginia in 1981. On October 16, 2020, the chain announced that it would be closing its remaining locations at close of business on October 18. The financial fallout of the COVID-19 pandemic was cited as a major reason for their permanent closure.

== See also ==
- List of Southern restaurants
