= Huckleberry's Breakfast & Lunch =

American restaurant chain

Restaurant information
- Food type: Southern
- Location: United States
- Website: huckleberrys.com

Huckleberry's Breakfast & Lunch is a California-based restaurant chain in the United States.

== Description ==
Huckleberry's Breakfast & Lunch's Southern menu includes beignets, fried green tomatoes, French toast, and sandwiches. The restaurant also serves iced tea and lemonade.

== History and locations ==
The business is owned by Heritage Restaurant Brands. There are approximately 30 locations. The business debuted in Oregon in 2026.

== See also ==
- List of Southern restaurants
