= Arnold's Country Kitchen =

Restaurant in Nashville, Tennessee, U.S.

- Interactive map of Arnold's Country Kitchen

Restaurant information
- Food type: Southern
- Location: 605 8th Avenue South, Nashville, Tennessee, 37203, United States
- Coordinates: 36°9′5″N 86°46′46″W
- Website: www.arnoldscountrykitchen.com

Arnold's Country Kitchen is a Southern restaurant in Nashville, Tennessee. The business received a James Beard American Classics Award in 2009. The restaurant has also been featured on the television series Diners, Drive-Ins and Dives. The menu has included Southern greens, chess pie, cornbread, black-eyed peas, and country-fried steak.

Arnold's is located at 605 Eighth Avenue in The Gulch.

== History ==
In 1982 Jack Arnold purchased it from owner Lynn Chandler and named it Arnold's. He ran the business with his wife, Rose, and their children.

Jack's son, Kahlil took over operations in 2008 following his father's retirement.

=== Temporary closure ===
It was announced in January 2023 that the restaurant would be closing. The Arnolds began the process of selling the restaurant's valuable real-estate in The Gulch, but the sale fell through. Arnold's re-opened for a wildly popular four-day Thanksgiving pop-up, and again in January 2024 to "temporarily" resume lunch service. After several weeks, the family took the property off the market and planned to keep Arnold's open indefinitely under Kahlil.

In August 2024, owner Kahlil Arnold announced a second location would be opening in North Nashville in early 2025 with sit-down service and reimagined versions of classic menu items, such as sandwich or taco adaptions.

== Arnold family ==
Jack Arnold was born in 1937 and started working in restaurants in his early teens. He attended Vanderbilt University before dropping out for restaurant work. He coped with the difficulties of life with alcohol and waitresses, and his first marriage ended after four children. Jack was known to carry guns, which he shot at the sky to scare away attempted thieves. When he was 36 he met Rose Arrieta, a Colombian-born 16-year-old. Despite her parents' hesitation, they married the following year in 1974 and had five children. Local meat-and-three restauranteur Lynn Chandler, founder of successful businesses such as Elliston Place Soda Shop, hired Arnold to run an Eighth Avenue restaurant called Sylvan Park Restaurant, and Jack Arnold purchased and renamed it in 1982. Jack, who had nine children, typically wore overalls and a bow tie and was known for his large personality and risqué humor.

The Arnold family has remained closely involved in daily operations. Jack and Rose's five kids were often woken up at 4:30am to work in the restaurant. Rose worked as a cashier. She eventually cut back her hours in the mid 1990s to get a nursing degree and work in the Vanderbilt hospital. Rose said Kahlil had worked in the Arnold's kitchen since he learned to walk. "I must have fired him a million times. But he's so cute I keep hiring him back." Though he did not initially plan to spend his career in the restaurant industry, Kahlil, the family's third son, transferred from Tennessee Tech to Middle Tennessee State so that he could work at the family business while finishing his criminal justice degree. He worked in other Nashville restaurants before returning to run Arnold's in 2005. In 2021, Kahlil's son Barrett moved back from Chicago to help with the business. He and Barrett created 7Up pancakes, an Arnold's breakfast staple.

== Reception ==
Food & Wine named Arnold's one of the best cafeterias in America and called its meats and local produce "some of the highest-quality cooking ever to grace a cafeteria line". It was featured on Diners, Drive in and Dives, and has been called the most prominent meat and three in operation. When it announced its closure, many eulogized Arnold's including chef and television personality Maneet Chauhan, who first had Arnold's on a Nashville trip in 2010. Notable guests include Dolly Parton, who ordered chicken livers and creamed corn for takeout, and Chet Atkins, who was a regular and once missed a call from the president because he was at Arnold's.

== See also ==
- List of Diners, Drive-Ins and Dives episodes
- List of James Beard America's Classics
- List of Southern restaurants
