= Café Camellia =

Restaurant in New York City, New York, U.S.

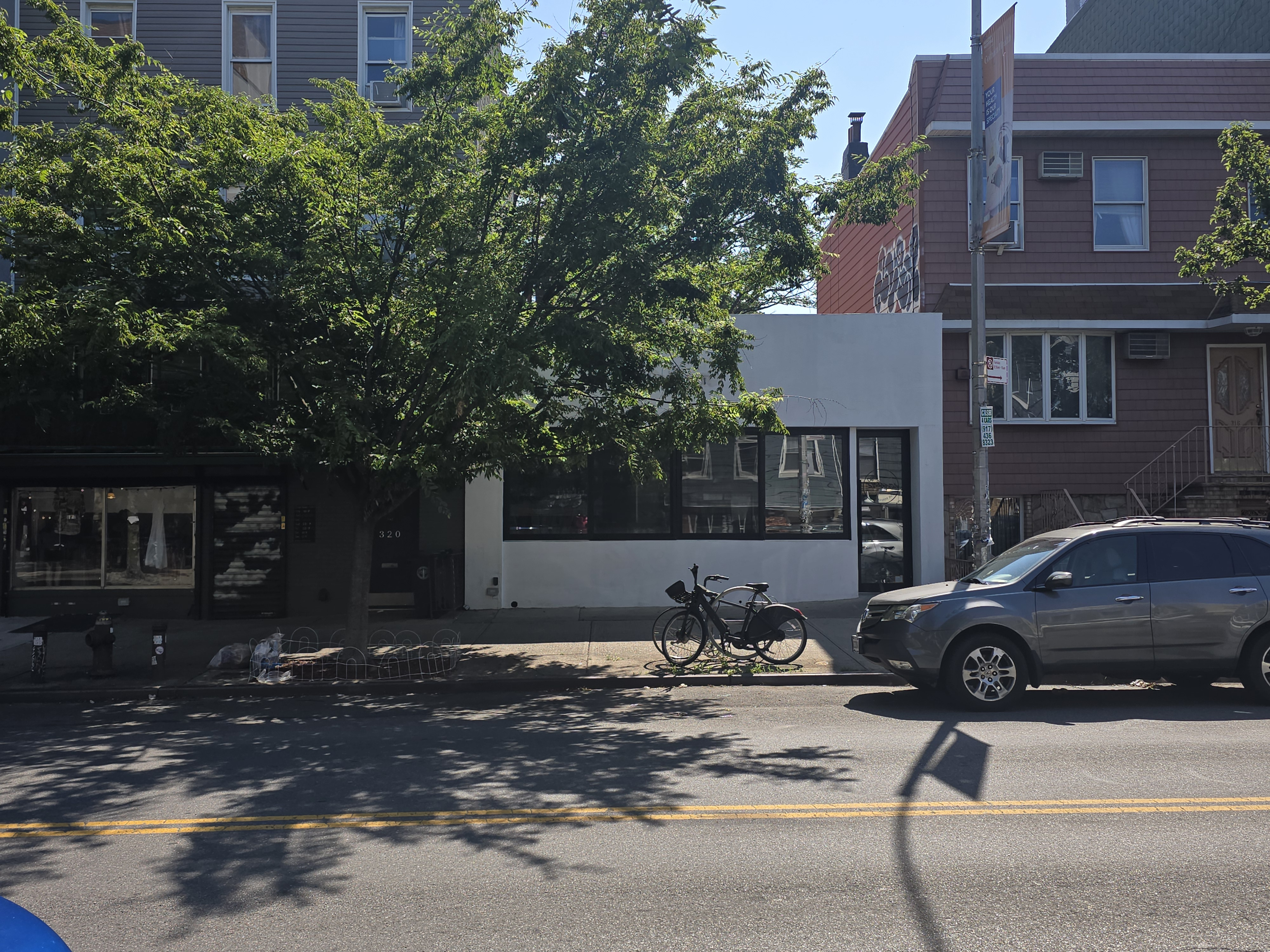
- The exterior of Cafe Camellia
- Interactive map of Café Camellia

Restaurant information
- Established: April 2023
- Closed: April 12, 2025
- Owner: Roger Jacobsen Jr.
- Head chef: Roger Jacobsen Jr.
- Food type: Southern
- Location: 318 Graham Avenue, Brooklyn, Kings County, New York, 11211, United States
- Coordinates: 40°42′48.6″N 73°56′38.5″W
- Reservations: resy.com/cities/ny/cafe-cameilia
- Website: cafecamelliabk.com

Café Camellia was a Southern restaurant in the East Williamsburg neighborhood of Brooklyn, New York, United States. Established in April 2023, the business was included in The New York Times's 2023 list of the 50 best restaurants in the United States. It also received 4 stars from Time Out. The restaurant closed its door permanently in April 2025.

== See also ==
- List of Southern restaurants
