= Hatchet Hall =

Restaurant in Los Angeles, California, U.S.

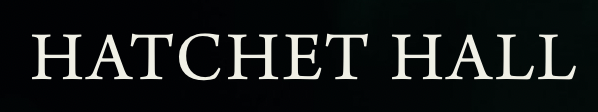

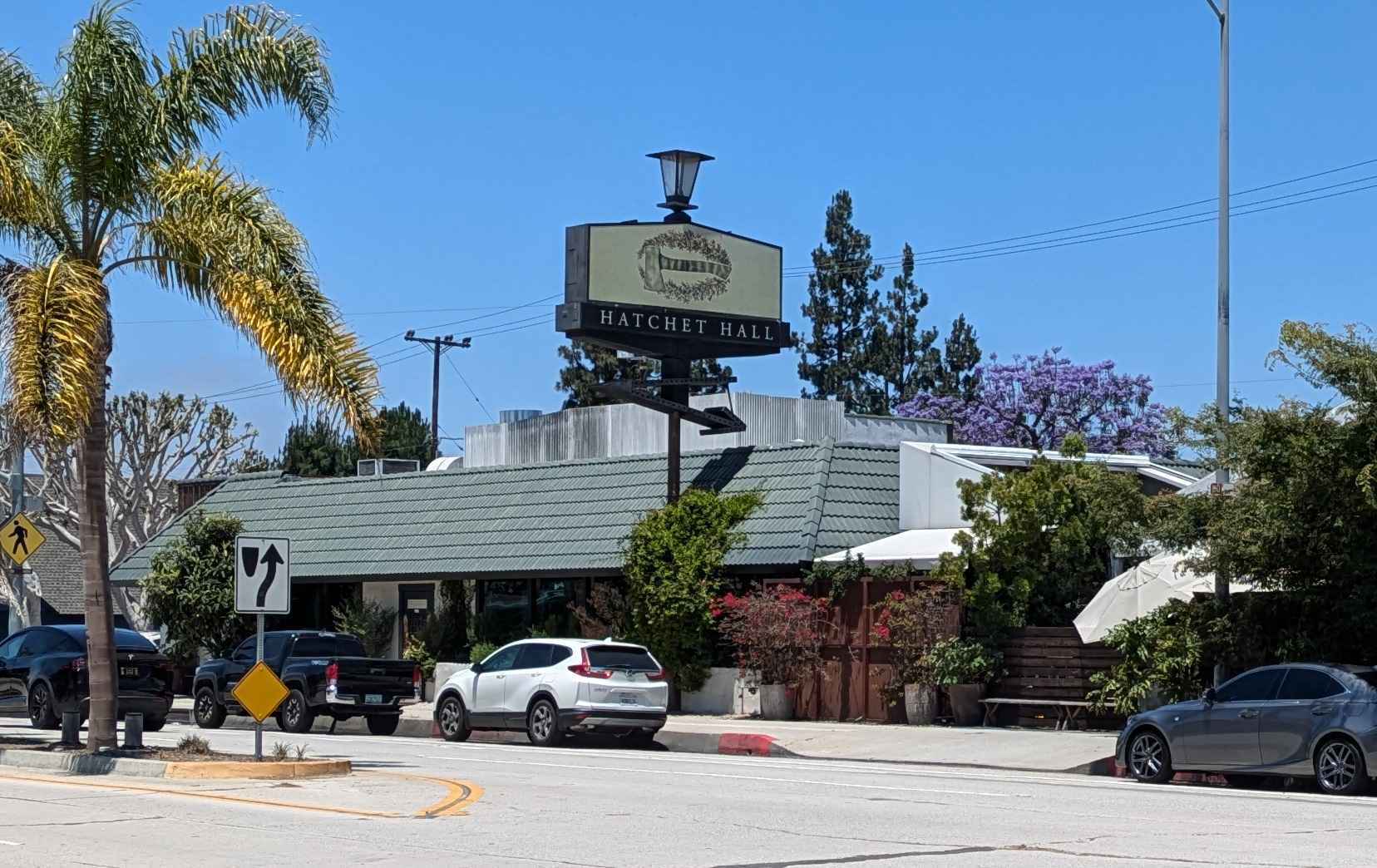
- The restaurant's exterior in 2024
- Interactive map of Hatchet Hall

Restaurant information
- Established: 2015; 11 years ago
- Food type: American; Southern
- Location: 12517 W. Washington Boulevard, Los Angeles, California, 90066, United States
- Coordinates: 33°59′49″N 118°25′54″W
- Website: www.hatchethallla.com

Hatchet Hall is a restaurant in Culver City, California, United States. The restaurant opened in 2015 and serves American and Southern cuisine.

== History ==
Hatchet Hall opened in 2015.

== Reception ==
Hatchet Hall was awarded a Michelin star in 2022 but lost it in 2023.

== See also ==
- List of Michelin-starred restaurants in California
- List of Southern restaurants
