= Lambert's Cafe =

US restaurant chain

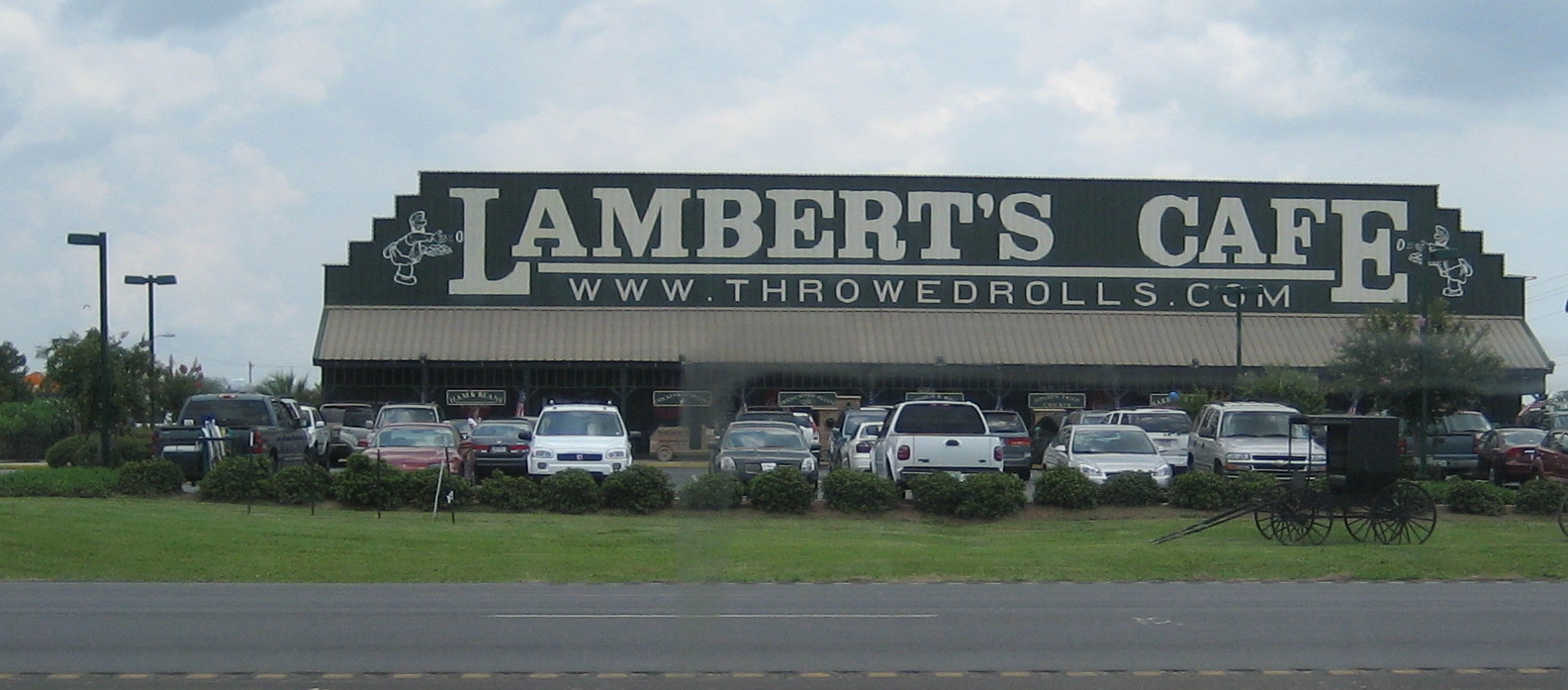
- Lambert's Cafe in Foley, Alabama

Restaurant information
- Established: 1942
- Food type: Southern/country cooking
- Website: throwedrolls.com

Lambert's Cafe is a US restaurant chain with locations in Foley, Alabama; Sikeston, Missouri; and Ozark, Missouri. It was founded in 1942. It is known for throwing hot rolls to the customers. It features Southern or country cooking (fried chicken, catfish, etc.); a variety of side dishes, called "pass arounds", are brought to the table to accompany each meal. The restaurants have been cited as a prime example of "road food", and diners often arrive via tour bus.

== History ==
The cafe was started in Sikeston in 1942 by Earl Lambert, assisted by his wife Agnes, his brother Robert, and Robert's wife Ruby. In 1976 Earl's son Norman "'Ole Norm" Lambert, a former football coach at Sikeston High School, took over management. It was Norman who started the tradition of throwing rolls to customers. In 1981 he explained, "I started throwing rolls about four years ago when we were in our old cafe. It was too crowded one noon for me to serve the rolls to a customer and somebody yelled, 'Throw em.' So I threw them. So, now I do that about every noon meal and during the evenings too. The rolls are fresh, right out of the oven."

== Legal issues ==
In August 2015 the restaurant was sued by a customer who says he suffered permanent eye injuries after being struck by a hot roll thrown by a staff member. A lawyer acting for the plaintiff said Lambert's has been sued for similar injuries in the past. A Lambert's spokesman confirmed that other customers have previously sought damages for similar claims, and in some cases medical expenses have been paid.

== See also ==
- List of Southern restaurants
