= Georgia Brown's =

Former restaurant in Washington, D.C., U.S.

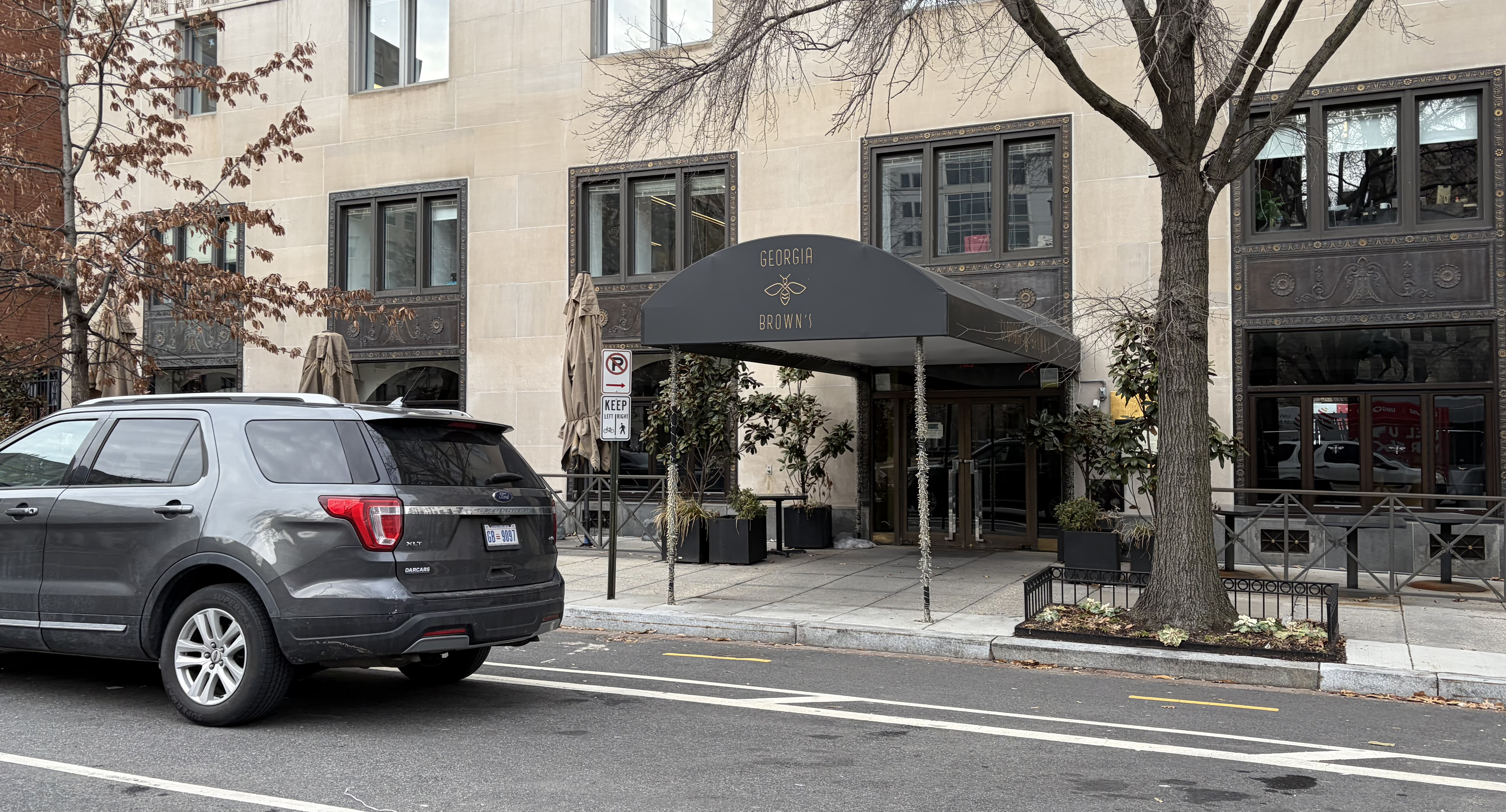
- Georgia Brown's in February 2026
- Interactive map of Georgia Brown's

Restaurant information
- Established: 1993
- Closed: September 1, 2025
- Food type: Southern; American
- Location: 950 15th Street NW, Washington, D.C., 20005, United States
- Coordinates: 38°54′6.8″N 77°2′5.1″W

Georgia Brown's was a restaurant located in Downtown Washington, D.C., United States. Opened in 1993, it served Southern American cuisine. It closed in 2025.

== Description ==
Georgia Brown's opened in 1993. Its buffet included ham, shrimp, grits, bacon, and French fries. After temporarily closing in March 2020 due to the COVID-19 pandemic, it underwent a three-month interior renovation, and reopened on November 6 of that year.

In July 2025, it was reported that the restaurant's space had been made available for lease and it would soon close. It closed on September 1, 2025.

== Reception ==
Time Out Washington, D.C. has rated the restaurant 3 out of 5 stars.

== See also ==
- List of Southern restaurants
