= Willie Nelson Biodiesel =

American biofuel company

BioWillie
- Product type: Biofuel
- Current owner: Willie Nelson Biodiesel
- Country: United States
- Introduced: 2004
- Tagline: Made in America. Stayed in America
- Website: BioWillieUSA.com

Willie Nelson Biodiesel is an American company started by singer-songwriter Willie Nelson, that produces biofuel under the brand name BioWillie. Nelson became interested in biofuels in 2004 after his wife bought a diesel car, which she fueled only with biodiesel. They were impressed by the efficiency and performance of the biofuels and their potential to end the dependence of the United States on foreign oil sources, as well as to provide the family farmers with work to produce it. The same year, he and his wife became partners with Bob and Kelly King in the building of two biodiesel plants, one in Salem, Oregon and the other at Carl's Corner, Texas.

Due to the high requirements of the brand, the availability of the fuel declined. In 2012, Nelson and Pacific Biodiesel reached an agreement for the production of the fuel. Starting during Nelson's birthday, on April 30, the company made available a retail pump containing BioWillie in Maui.

== History ==
Willie Nelson Biodiesel produces a biodiesel fuel called BioWillie made of soybean and other vegetable oils that can be used in modern diesel engines instead of regular fuel without vehicle modifications. Nelson became interested in the use of biofuels when his wife, Annie, purchased a diesel car in 2004. She only filled the car with biodiesel. Impressed by the performance of the fuels, and by the potential independence from foreign oil that could provide. The same year, he and his wife became partners with Bob and Kelly King in the building of two biodiesel plants, the SeQuential-Pacific facility in Salem, Oregon and the other at Carl's Corner, Texas (the Texas plant was founded by Carl Cornelius, a longtime Nelson friend and the namesake for Carl's Corner). In 2005, Nelson and several other business partners formed Willie Nelson Biodiesel branded as "BioWillie". ("Bio-Willie"), a company that is marketing biodiesel biofuel to truck stops. The fuel is made from vegetable oil (mainly soybean oil), and is typically distributed as a B20 blend (20% biodiesel and 80% petroleum diesel) to ensure compatibility with standard diesel engines without modification. Pure, unblended biodiesel (B100) is a Fatty Acid Methyl Ester (FAME) fuel, which possesses different chemical properties from petroleum diesel and true "drop-in" renewable diesel, necessitating blending for regular commercial vehicle use, or requiring significant vehicle engine modifications to use it as B100. Nelson stated: "There is really no need going around starting wars over oil. We have it here at home. We have the necessary product, the farmers can grow it."

== Distribution ==
Earth Biodiesel Inc., a publicly traded company (OTCBB: EBOF), is the exclusive distributor of BioWillie. In 2006, Willie Nelson reported the ownership of 6,537,500 shares of Earth Biodiesel Inc. to the Securities and Exchange Commission. In 2007, Nelson published On the Clean Road Again: Biodiesel and the Future of the Family Farm. The book described the benefits of the use of biofuels, its performance, the possibility of the independence of foreign oil and the opportunity of production by family farmers. The use of the BioWillie later declined due to the restrictions of the brand, that specifies that the fuel must meet or exceed standards established by the American Society of Testing and Materials. Meanwhile, the fuel also has to meet the conditions of the Sustainable Biodiesel Alliance. The BioWillie can only be produced in the United States, with local sources and used in the country. In 2012, Nelson reached an agreement with Pacific Biodiesel to meet the conditions for the distribution of the fuel. The same year beginning from Nelson's birthday, on April 30, Pacific Biodiesel made available a retail pump, containing BioWillie.

== See also ==
- Willie's Place – a former truck stop named after Willie Nelson that was the first to sell Willie Nelson Biodiesel

== Bibliography ==
- Nelson, Willie (2007). On the Clean Road Again: Biodiesel and the Future of the Family Farm. Speaker's Corner. ISBN 978-1-45875618-3.
