= Florence's Restaurant =

Restaurant in Oklahoma City, Oklahoma, U.S.

Coordinates: 35.4934°N 97.4866°W

- Interactive map of Florence's Restaurant

Restaurant information
- Established: 1952
- Owner: Florence Jones Kemp
- Food type: Southern US
- Location: Oklahoma City, Oklahoma, United States
- Website: theflorencesrestaurant.com

Florence's Restaurant is a restaurant in Oklahoma City. In 2022 it was named one of America's Classics by the James Beard Foundation.

== History ==
The restaurant was opened by Florence Jones Kemp, a sharecropper's daughter from Boley, Oklahoma, in 1952 when she was 22 years old. She recalled "I decided that I needed a job and I didn't like working for other people."

The first location was on 4th Street near Deep Deuce in a single room with a single table and a second-hand stove. Within two years Kemp had saved enough from her profits to send her sister to college.

After several moves, at least one caused by urban renewal projects, by 1969 the restaurant was located at northeast corner of NE 23 and Fonshill in Oklahoma City, where it stayed. Kemp had decided she didn't want to rely on landlords and bought her own property. As of 2022 she owned most of the block.

As of 2022 she continued to operate it with her daughter Victoria Kemp.

== Menu ==
The restaurant serves southern specialities including fried chicken, chicken and dumplings, braised oxtail, chicken wings, ribs, candied yams, cornbread, peach cobbler, and pear pie. The television show Diners, Drive Ins and Dives featured one of the restaurant's dishes, Yammed Fried Chicken, in its fried chicken episode.

== Recognition ==
In 2022 the restaurant was named one of America's Classics by the James Beard Foundation. It was the first James Beard award for an Oklahoma entity. The Oklahoman called Florence's "The Grand Dame of all local restaurants."

== See also ==
- List of Southern restaurants
