= Jackson's Catfish Corner =

Restaurant in Seattle, Washington, U.S.

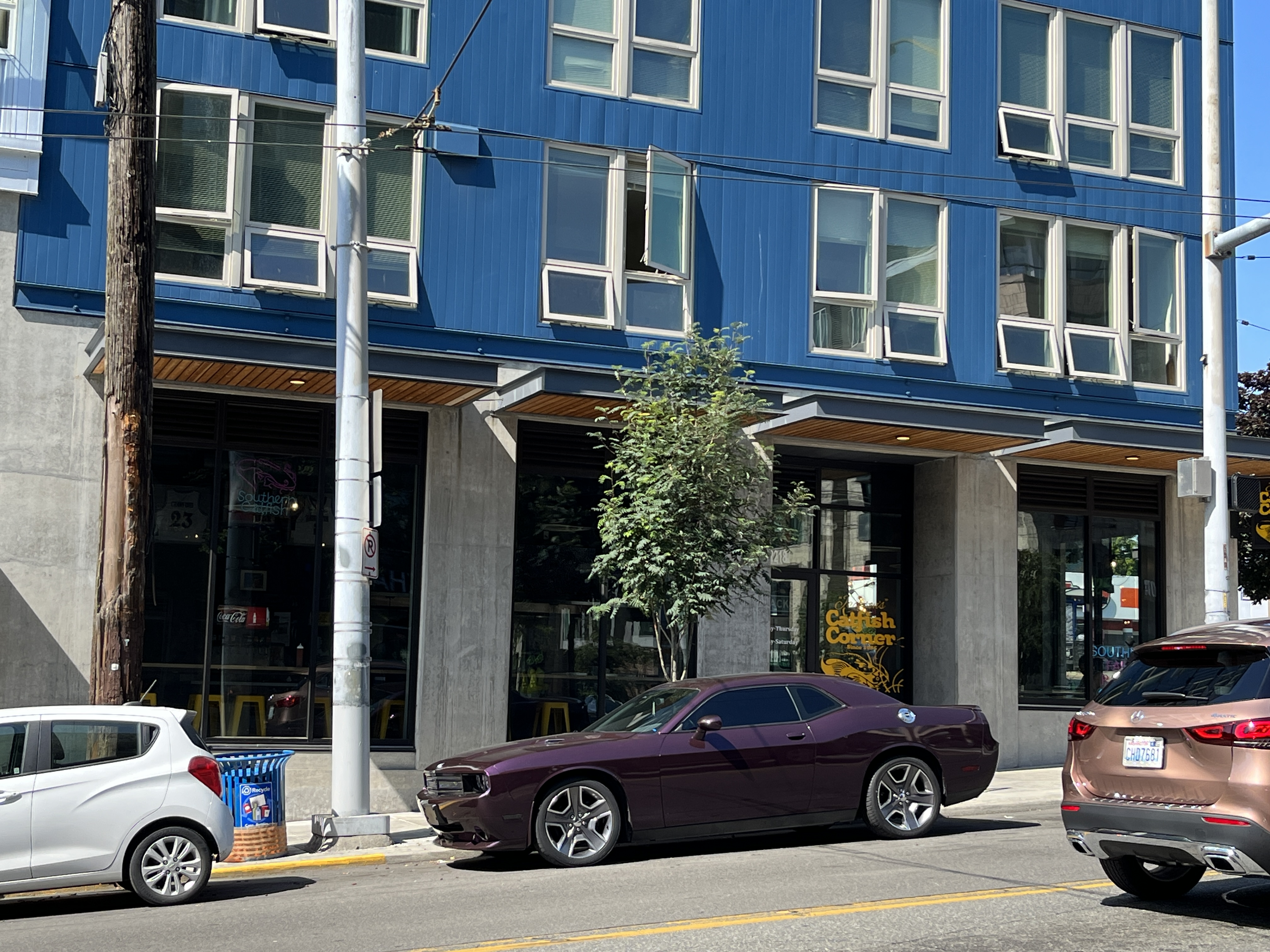
- The restaurant's exterior, 2023
- Interactive map of Jackson's Catfish Corner

Restaurant information
- Established: 1985
- Owners: Terrell and Rachel Jackson
- Previous owners: Woodrow (Woody) and Rosemary (Rosie) Jackson
- Food type: Southern; soul food; seafood
- Location: 2218 South Jackson Street, Seattle, King, Washington, 98144, United States
- Coordinates: 47.5994°N 122.3025°W

Jackson's Catfish Corner (originally Catfish Corner) is a family-owned Southern restaurant in Seattle's Central District, in the U.S. state of Washington. Woodrow (Woody) and Rosemary (Rosie) Jackson opened Catfish Corner in the Central District in 1985. After selling the business to friends in 2009, the restaurant closed in 2014.

The Jacksons' grandson Terrell and his wife Rachel reopened and rebranded the restaurant in 2015. Jackson's Catfish corner had a brick and mortar in Rainier Valley, before relocating and operating in the Central District again from 2016 to 2018. Jackson's Catfish Corner reopened at 23rd and South Jackson Street in 2021. It closed on January 3, 2025.

The Black-owned business had a catfish-dominant menu that has included gumbo, hushpuppies, prawns, and other seafood and soul food options such as fish and chips, coleslaw, collard greens, sweet potatoes, and rice and beans. Jackson's Catfish Corner garnered a positive reception.

== Description ==
The Southern restaurant Jackson's Catfish Corner currently operates as a pop-up on E Yesler Way. Previously, the business operated at other locations in the Central District. The Black-owned, family-operated fast casual restaurant's menu is catfish-heavy but also includes gumbo, the Ohbama burger, hushpuppies, prawns, snapper and other seafood and soul food items such as fish and chips, coleslaw, collard greens, candied sweet potatoes, and rice and beans. The Captain's Platter includes seven strips of catfish, seven prawns, four hushpuppies, and French fries. Jackson's Catfish Corner makes its own tartar sauce. The dessert menu includes banana pudding, German chocolate cake with caramel, and red velvet cupcakes.

== History ==
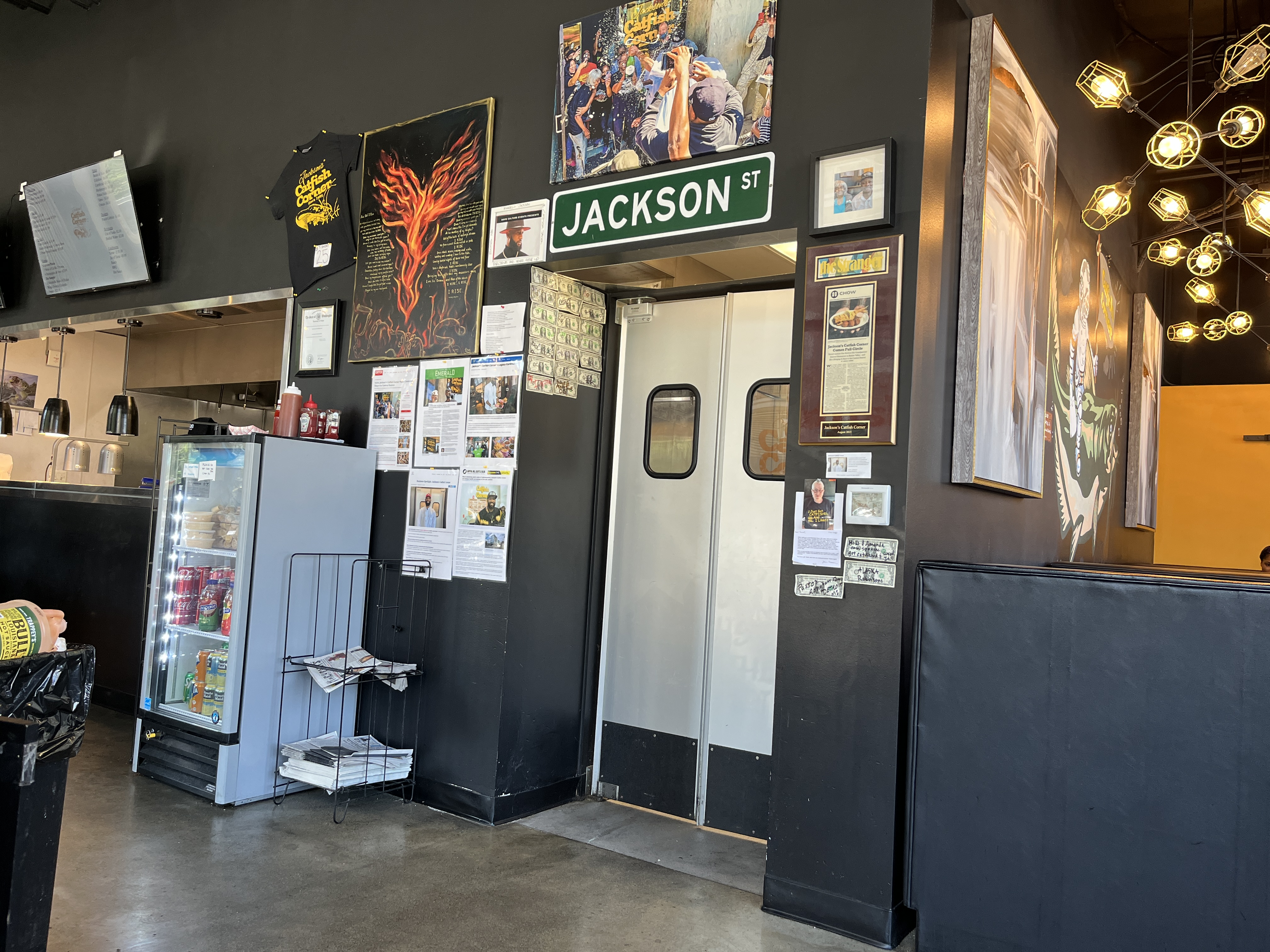
The restaurant's interior in 2023

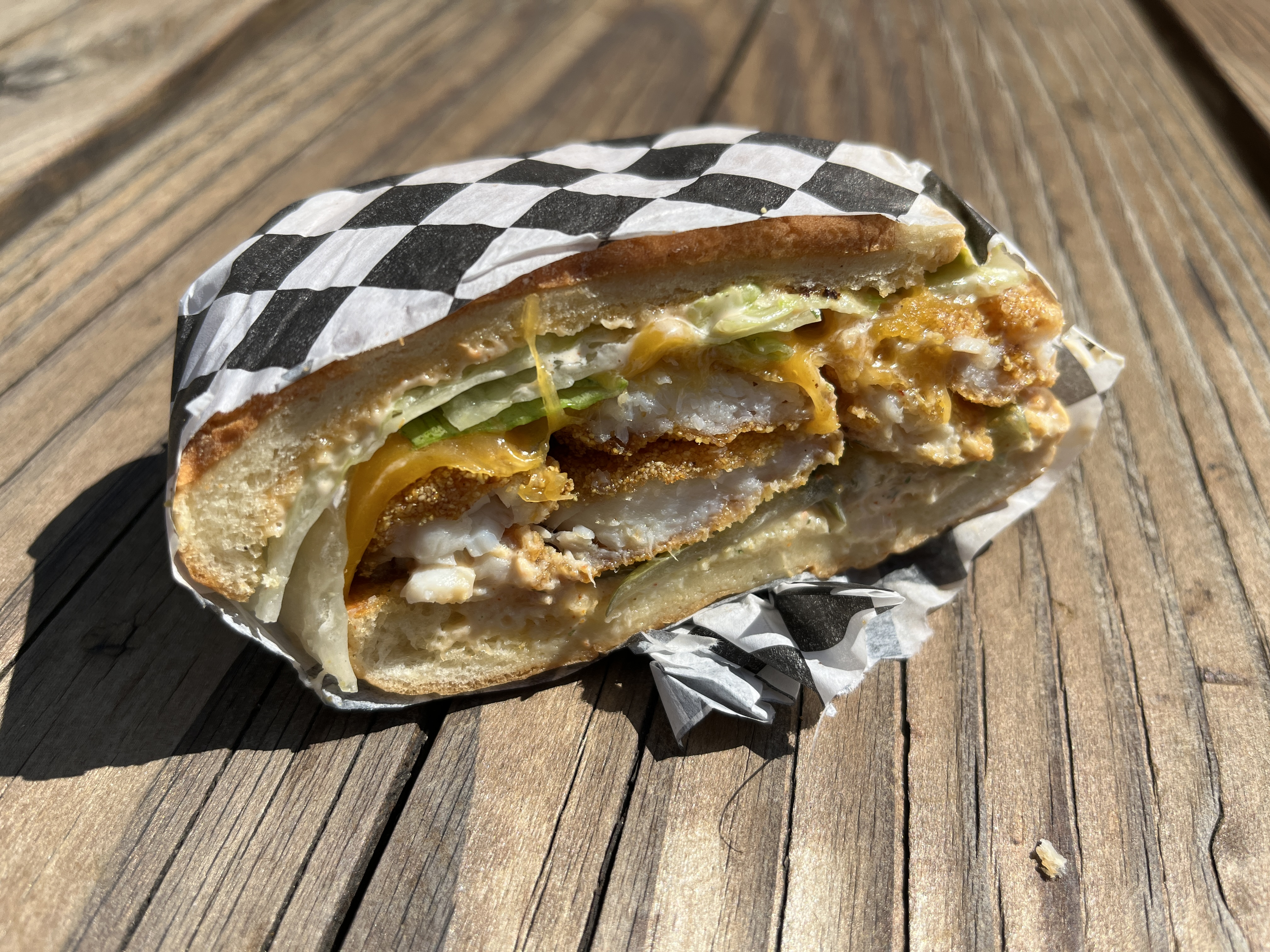
Catfish sandwich, 2023

Spouses Woodrow (Woody) and Rosemary (Rosie) Jackson opened Catfish Corner on East Cherry Street at Martin Luther King Jr., in the Central District, in 1985. In 2009, the couple sold the business to friends. The restaurant closed in August 2014.

Terrell Jackson and his wife Rachel restarted and rebranded the restaurant as Jackson's Catfish Corner in 2015. Initially, the couple sold food from a tent before securing a permanent location in Rainier Beach. The couple announced plans to open a second location at 21st in the Central District. Some funds for the project were raised via GoFundMe. The restaurant operated from 2016 to 2018.

Jackson's Catfish Corner reopened at 23rd and South Jackson Street in 2021. The 4,500-square-foot space is in the Community House Mental Health Agency's Patricia K Apartments development. A grand opening was held on Juneteenth. The Infatuation's Carlo Mantuano wrote: "Catfish Corner's return to the Central District after a 12-year hiatus is a huge deal. Talk to anybody who lived or worked in the area in the '90s and you'll likely hear stories of post-workday fried seafood or lunchtime Southern sides." The Jacksons had a 25-year lease. The restaurant closed permanently on January 3, 2025.

The restaurant was featured on season 1, episode 2 ("Winner Winner Free Dinner") of the Food Network series Big Bargain Eats. Jackson's Catfish Corner participated in Seattle's Black Restaurant Week.

Jackson's Catfish Corner reopened once again in July 2026 as a pop-up location at 1800 E Yesler Way. Jackson plans to maintain a permanent presence once negotiations with the property's landlord conclude.

== Reception ==
When David Brewster was writing anonymous restaurant reviews for the newsletter A Gourmet's Notebook, he said Catfish Corner had "very fine fast food". In The Food and Drink of Seattle: From Wild Salmon to Craft Beer (2018), Judith Dern said the business "[expands] the tradition of African American food in Seattle". Naomi Tomky included the restaurant in Thrillist's 2022 overview of "where to eat in Seattle right now". Nate Hall included Jackson's Catfish Corner in Eater Seattle's 2022 list of "fabulous" fish and chips destinations in the Seattle metropolitan area. The restaurant was also included in the website's 2022 list of Seattle's "most sensational" sandwiches and 2023 list of the city's "essential" seafood restaurants. Aimee Rizzo included Jackson's Catfish Corner in The Infatuation's 2022 overview of Seattle's best fish and chips.

== See also ==
- List of Black-owned restaurants
- List of fish and chip restaurants
- List of seafood restaurants
- List of soul food restaurants
- List of Southern restaurants
