= Red dress party =

Event where people wear red dresses, attended predominantly by gay men in drag

In LGBTQ culture, red dress parties are events in which people wear red dresses, regardless of gender. The first Red Dress Party fundraising event was held in Portland, Oregon in 2001, with only 75 people in attendance.

== History ==
This event started as a promise kept by a gay male couple after they received HIV diagnoses. They each promised to wear red at their funerals instead of the black attire typically worn at funerals in order to bring attention to the HIV/AIDS epidemic in the United States. Since 2005, Red Dress Parties have become popularized in other larger cities such as Toronto, Chicago and San Diego. Attendees pay an entry ticket usually varying from $45 to $155 per person. Nationwide profits go to organizations such as Planned Parenthood, Q Center Portland, AIDS Foundation, the Equality Project, and the HIV Funding Collective.

== Themes ==
Many annual red dress parties incorporate an annual theme. During the COVID-19 pandemic, Red Dress Party San Diego hosted a virtual event on October 3. For this virtual event, attendees were encouraged to participate in the "Serve Your Lewks" photo contest, which judges the participant's ability to create drag looks given a theme. Portland's drag event, set to a "Roaring Red" theme, inspired by the 1920s' elegance, was postponed until further notice. Previous Portland events include 2019's "Totally Red", 2018's "Wicked Red", 2017's "Red Queen", and 2016's "Walking Red".

In Toronto, Canada, The Red Dress Ball has been a staple of the LGBTQ community since 2018, attracting sold-out crowds in support of people at risk or impacted by HIV/AIDS. Much like its American counterparts, The Red Dress Ball encourages all participants to dress in red, with a wide variety of daring and interesting outfit creations on display; however, it does not stipulate specific dress themes, allowing participants to exercise their individual creativity. During the COVID-19 pandemic, The Red Dress Ball continued virtually, producing two editions over an ongoing lock-down, and it will continue to operate a hybrid model from 2022 onwards, with an in-person event and a virtual afterparty angled towards national and international participation.

== Locations ==
Cities with annual events include Toronto, Palm Springs, Ontario (Canada), Portland, Oregon, San Diego., Hollywood, Seattle, Sacramento, and Chicago.

=== Toronto, Ontario ===
In Toronto, Ontario, the red dress fundraiser is known as The Red Dress Ball, and commenced at grassroots in 2018 with more than 500 guests in attendance. It's organized by The Red Dress Ball Foundation, a Canadian non-profit incorporated in 2022. The organization is dedicated to ensuring ongoing awareness of the continuing impact of HIV/AIDS in Canada, raising funds to support initiatives & organizations that help people living with, or at risk of HIV/AIDS. Each year, they bring together a broad and diverse community to raise money and make connections, advocating for a world without HIV/AIDS stigma, and coming together as a community to give back. In 2022, their funding recipients will be the Toronto People With AIDS Foundation (PWA), the Black Coalition for AIDS Prevention (Black CAP), and HQ Toronto.

=== Portland, Oregon ===
The Portland charity event began as a basement party in 2001, and benefits organizations supporting LGBTQ youth and people living with HIV/AIDS. The staff and crew are all volunteers. Parties are now attended by 2,000 people and raise as much as $30,000 annually. Chelsea Clinton attended the 2008 event. The event is usually held at the Veteran's Memorial Coliseum.

=== San Diego ===
Red Dress Party San Diego is presented by the Think Red Project, and funds generated from Red Dress Party San Diego directly benefit the San Diego HIV Funding Collaborative (SDHFC), which helps the community by offering grants to 501(c)(3) organizations which then use the money to further advocate for, support, and educate those affected by HIV and AIDS.

=== Hollywood ===
Hollywood's annual Red Dress Party took place at Gold Coast Bar, before its closure in 2019. Attendees put their best red outfits on, and joined each other for drinks at a discounted price. It took place from 2pm to midnight. In previous years, all proceeds went to Life Group LA.

=== Seattle ===
Held in Fremont Studios, Seattle's Red Dress Party takes up three large studio rooms, and an outside lot for food trucks. There are DJs, performers, and a silent auction that go towards donations. All proceeds go to local LGBTQ foundations and AIDS/HIV prevention organizations. Tickets are a tax write-off. Red Dress Party Seattle closed in 2024, citing overall impact from the 2020 COVID pandemic and general decline in attendance.

=== Sacramento ===
Sacramento's Red Dress Party is organized by the Sacramento LGBT Community Center. This event has been awarded Q-Sac Magazine's "2014 Best Gayborhood Party", a two-time cover feature on Outward Magazine, and news coverage on the Morning Show on Fox40, and News 10.

=== Chicago ===
Chicago's Red Dress Party is presented by the Equality Project. Events include DJs, drag races, and singers.
