= Carl's Corner, Texas =

- Town
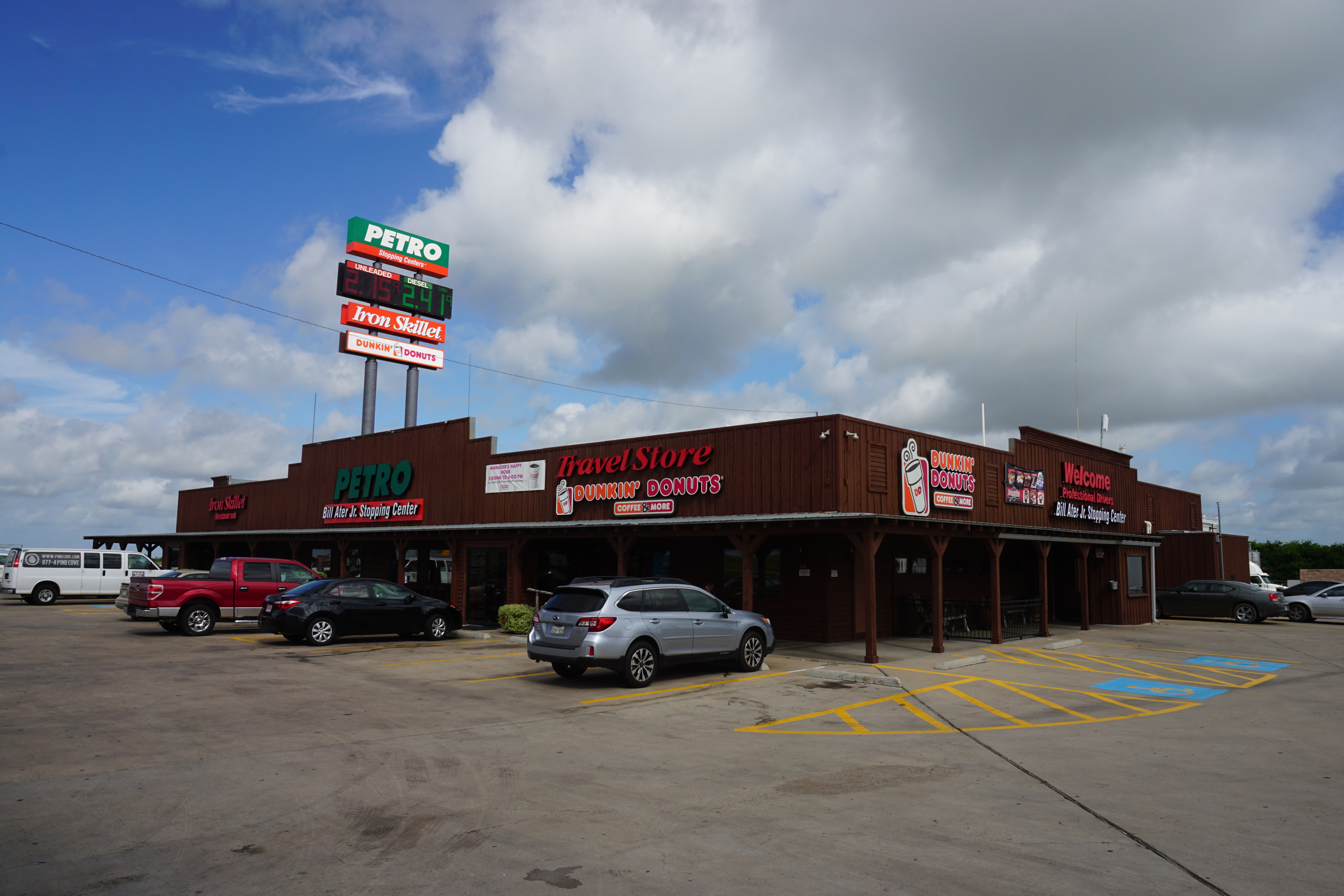
- The Petro Stopping Center in Carl's Corner.

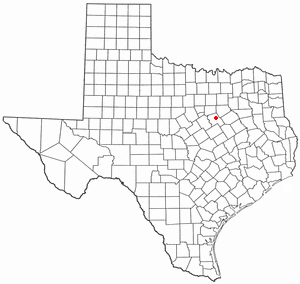
- Location of Carl's Corner, Texas

- Coordinates: 32°05′03″N 97°03′09″W
- Country: United States
- State: Texas
- County: Hill

Area
  - Total: 2.68 sq mi (6.94 km^{2})
  - Land: 2.67 sq mi (6.91 km^{2})
  - Water: 0.0077 sq mi (0.02 km^{2})
- Elevation: 804 ft (245 m)

Population (2020)
  - Total: 201
  - Density: 75.3/sq mi (29.1/km^{2})
- Time zone: UTC-6 (Central (CST))
  - Summer (DST): UTC-5 (CDT)
- FIPS code: 48-12895
- GNIS feature ID: 2413169
- Website: cityofcarlscorner.com

Carl's Corner is a town in Hill County, Texas, United States. The population was 201 at the 2020 census. The town was founded by, and named after, Carl Cornelius, a local truck stop owner and long-time friend of Willie Nelson. Cornelius founded the town for the purpose of legalizing alcohol sales in the otherwise mostly-dry county.

Cornelius' property adjacent to the truck stop was the site of several Willie Nelson Fourth of July concerts in the early 1980s. Cornelius' truck stop was also the first to offer BioWillie, the biodiesel fuel marketed by Willie Nelson. The former Willie's Place truck stop was located at Carl's Corner.

Carl Cornelius died September 21, 2021.

== Geography ==
Carl's Corner is located in northeastern Hill County in the northern part of Central Texas. Interstate 35E runs through the town, with access from Exit 374. Hillsboro, the county seat, is 7 miles (11 km) to the southwest, and Dallas is 55 miles (89 km) to the northeast.

According to the United States Census Bureau, the town has a total area of 2.7 square miles (7.0 km^{2}), of which 0.01 square miles (0.02 km^{2}), or 0.34%, are water.

== Demographics ==
Historical population
Census	Pop.	Note	%±
1990	94		—
2000	134		42.6%
2010	173		29.1%
2020	201		16.2%
U.S. Decennial Census

=== 2020 census ===
Carl's Corner racial composition (NH = Non-Hispanic) (Note: Note: the US Census treats Hispanic/Latino as an ethnic category. This table excludes Latinos from the racial categories and assigns them to a separate category. Hispanics/Latinos can be of any race.)
Race	Number	Percentage
White (NH)	78	38.81%
Black or African American (NH)	5	2.49%
Native American or Alaska Native (NH)	1	0.5%
Asian (NH)	1	0.5%
Pacific Islander (NH)	1	0.5%
Mixed/Multi-Racial (NH)	10	4.98%
Hispanic or Latino	105	52.24%
Total	201	

As of the 2020 United States census, there were 201 people, 72 households, and 52 families residing in the town.

=== 2000 census ===
As of the census of 2000, there were 134 people, 50 households, and 38 families residing in the town. The population density was 70.4 inhabitants per square mile (27.2/km^{2}). There were 58 housing units at an average density of 30.5 per square mile (11.8/km^{2}). The racial makeup of the town was 93.28% White, 6.72% from other races. Hispanic or Latino of any race were 11.19% of the population.

There were 50 households, out of which 40.0% had children under the age of 18 living with them, 68.0% were married couples living together, 4.0% had a female householder with no husband present, and 24.0% were non-families. 20.0% of all households were made up of individuals, and 8.0% had someone living alone who was 65 years of age or older. The average household size was 2.68 and the average family size was 3.13.

In the town, the population was spread out, with 29.1% under the age of 18, 8.2% from 18 to 24, 29.1% from 25 to 44, 23.9% from 45 to 64, and 9.7% who were 65 years of age or older. The median age was 37 years. For every 100 females, there were 100.0 males. For every 100 females age 18 and over, there were 102.1 males.

The median income for a household in the town was $46,250, and the median income for a family was $44,375. Males had a median income of $36,875 versus $24,375 for females. The per capita income for the town was $20,073. There were 5.3% of families and 5.6% of the population living below the poverty line, including 9.4% of under eighteens and none of those over 64.

== Education ==
Carl's Corner is served by the Itasca and Hillsboro Independent School Districts.
