= South LA Cafe =

Coffee shop in Los Angeles

- Interactive map of South LA Cafe

Restaurant information
- Established: December 2019
- Owners: Joe Ward-Wallace; Celia Ward-Wallace
- Location: 1700 Browning Blvd, Los Angeles, Los Angeles, California, 90062, United States
- Coordinates: 34.01175006624548°N 118.30914807449375°W
- Website: southlacafe.com

South LA Cafe is a Black-owned coffee shop located on Browning Boulevard in Los Angeles, California, United States.

== History ==
South LA Cafe opened for business in December 2019 by spouses Joe and Celia Ward-Wallace.

== Reception ==
The Los Angeles Standard Newspaper called South LA Cafe a "cultural hub that serves amazing coffee".

== See also ==
- List of Black-owned restaurants
