= List of Black-owned restaurants =

Following is a list of notable current and defunct Black-owned restaurants, including bakeries as well as food carts and trucks, sorted by location (of headquarters in cases of chains):

== Nigeria ==
- Veggie Victory – Lagos

== South Africa ==
- Mzoli's – Gugulethu

== United States ==
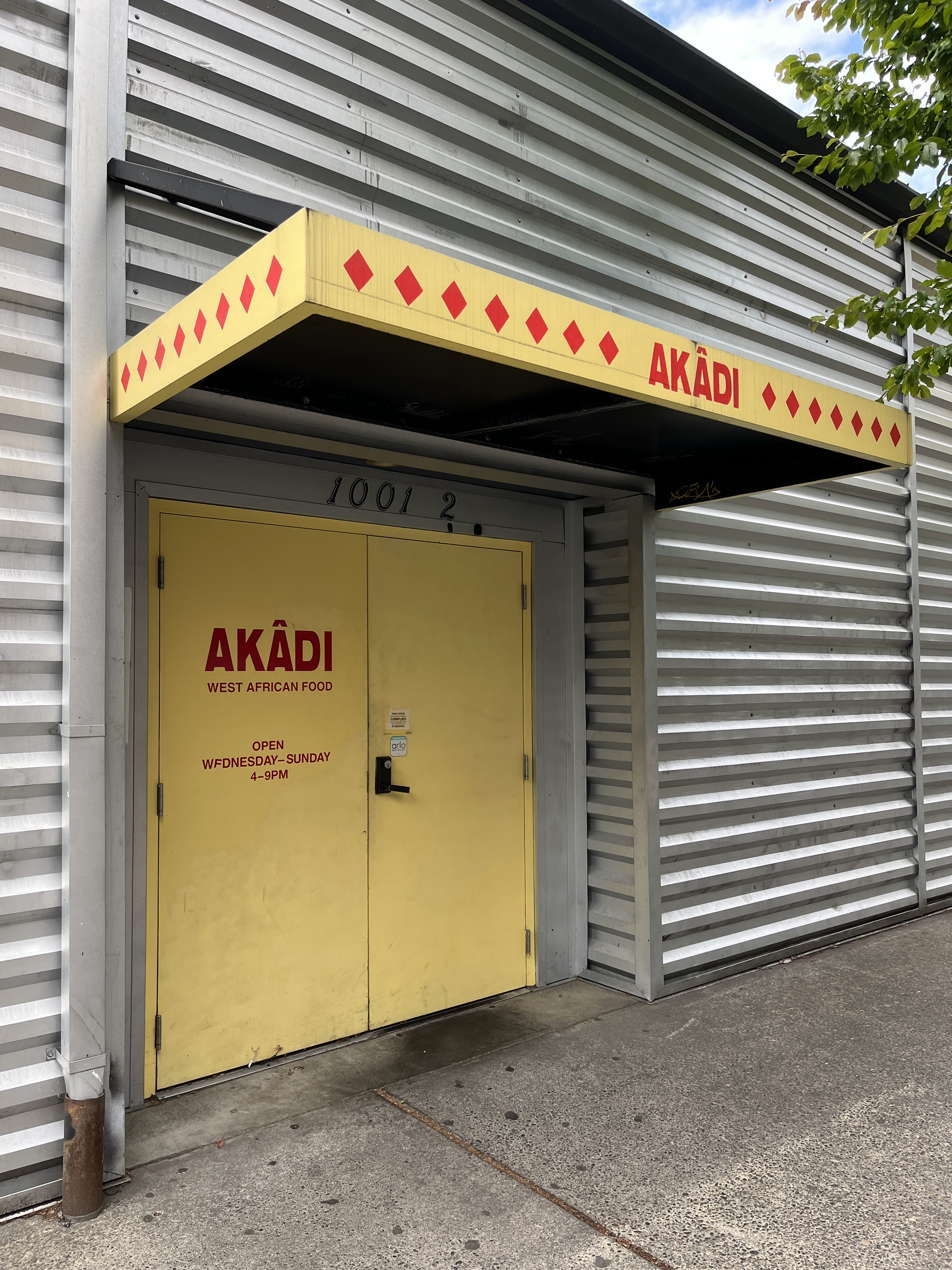
Exterior of Akadi in Portland, Oregon, 2025

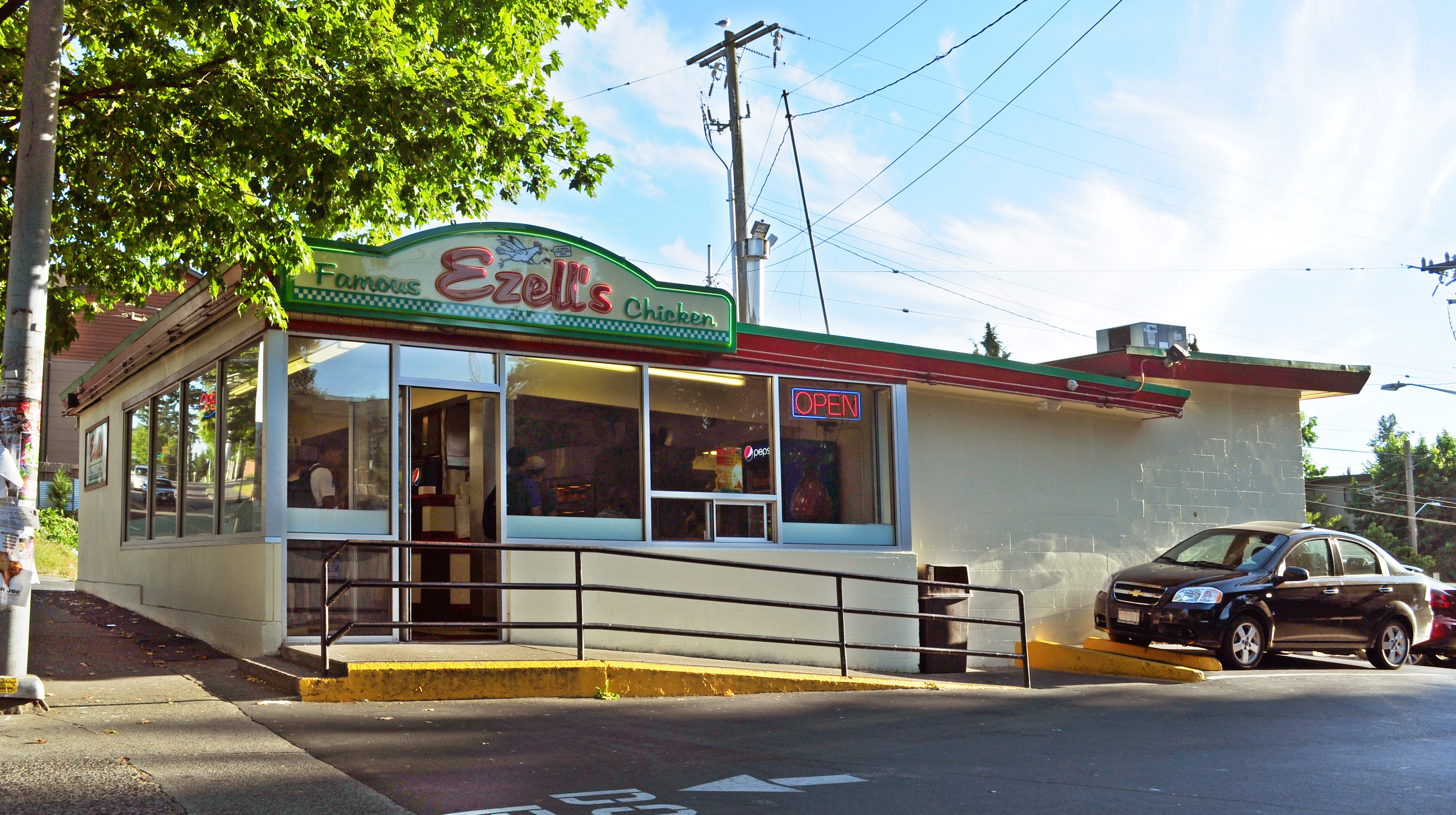
The original Ezell's Chicken location in Seattle, Washington, in 2012

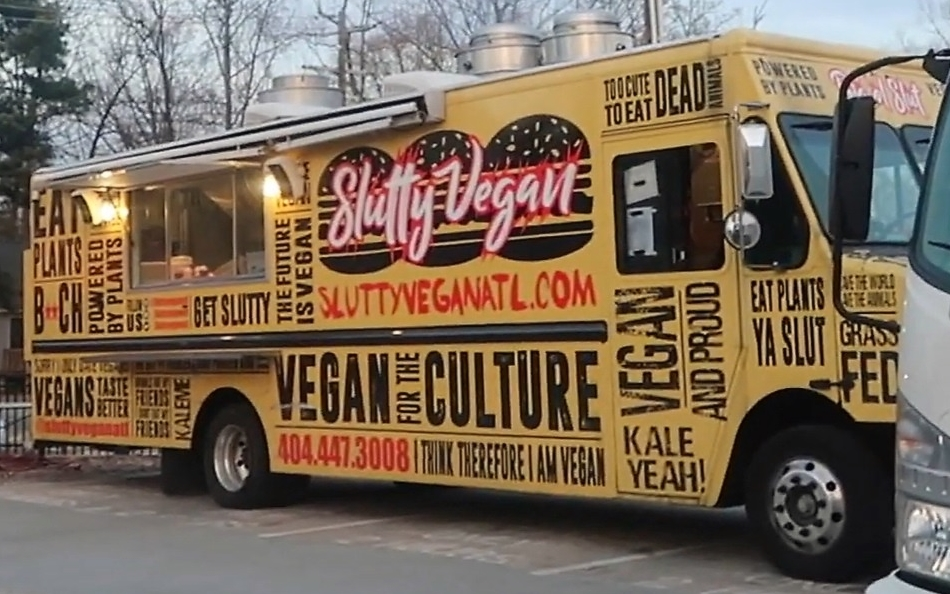
Slutty Vegan food truck

=== Arkansas ===
- Jones Bar-B-Q Diner – Marianna
- Lassis Inn – Little Rock

=== California ===
- Hawkins House of Burgers – Los Angeles
- Roscoe's House of Chicken 'N Waffles – Los Angeles
- South LA Cafe – Los Angeles
- Your Black Muslim Bakery – Oakland, formerly based in Santa Barbara

=== District of Columbia ===
- Ben's Chili Bowl
- Georgia Brown's

=== Georgia ===
- Blaze Pizza – Atlanta, franchise formerly based in Pasadena, California
- Bomb Biscuits – Atlanta
- Busy Bee – Atlanta
- Mary Mac's Tea Room – Atlanta
- Paschal's – Atlanta
- Slutty Vegan – Atlanta

=== Louisiana ===
- Dooky Chase's Restaurant – New Orleans

=== Maryland ===
- Huncho House – Hyattsville

=== Mississippi ===
- Bully's Restaurant – Jackson

=== Nebraska ===
- Jackson's Fair Deal Cafe – Omaha

=== New Jersey ===
- Corinne's Place - Camden

=== New York ===
- Charles' Southern Style Kitchen – Harlem
- Sylvia's – Harlem

=== North Carolina ===
- Bird Pizzeria – Charlotte
- Saltbox Seafood Joint – Durham

=== Oklahoma ===
- Florence's Restaurant – Oklahoma City
- Grey Sweater – Oklahoma City

=== Oregon ===
- Akadi – Portland
- Amalfi's Italian Restaurant – Portland
- Assembly Brewing – Portland
- Atlas Pizza – Portland
- Deadstock Coffee – Portland
- Dirty Lettuce – Portland
- Erica's Soul Food – Portland
- Everybody Eats PDX – Portland
- Fat Cupcake
- Grits n' Gravy – Portland
- Joe Brown's Carmel Corn – Portland
- Kann – Portland
- Kee's Loaded Kitchen – Portland
- LoRell's Chicken Shack
- Nacheaux – West Linn (previously Portland)
- Olive or Twist – Portland
- Queen of Sheba – Portland
- Reo's Ribs – Portland
- Santé Bar – Portland
- Stoopid Burger – Portland
- Viking Soul Food – Portland

=== South Carolina ===
- Bertha's Kitchen – Charleston

=== Tennessee ===
- Prince's Hot Chicken Shack – Nashville

=== Texas ===
- Frenchy's Chicken – Houston

=== Washington ===
- Black Coffee Northwest – Seattle
- Boon Boona Coffee – Renton
- Café Avole – Seattle
- Cafe Campagne – Seattle
- Communion Restaurant and Bar – Seattle
- Ezell's Chicken – Seattle
- Fat's Chicken and Waffles – Seattle
- Jackson's Catfish Corner – Seattle
- Lil Red Takeout and Catering – Seattle
- Marjorie – Seattle
- The Original Philly's – Seattle
- Osteria la Spiga – Seattle
- Plum Bistro – Seattle
- Quick Pack Food Mart – Seattle
- Shikorina – Seattle
