= Black Coffee Northwest =

Coffee chain in the U.S. state of Washington

Restaurant information
- Established: October 18, 2020
- Owners: Darnesha and Edwin Weary
- Location: 2300 S Jackson St, Seattle, Washington, United States
- Other locations: Shoreline (former)
- Website: blackcoffeenw.com

Black Coffee Northwest (sometimes abbreviated Black Coffee NW) is a Black-owned coffee company based in the Seattle metropolitan area, in the U.S. state of Washington. The business has operated coffee shops in Shoreline and Seattle's Ballard neighborhood, and is also a whole bean roaster. Black Coffee Northwest plans to open a shop in Seattle's Central District in 2024.

Black Coffee Northwest also serves as a community hub, and provides barista training and internships. Eater Seattle has said the business created a space "for art, mutual aid, and activism", and Seattle Metropolitan has said Black Coffee Northwest "blends brews with cultural salon talk".

The menu has included the "Karen", a caffè mocha with white chocolate named after the pejorative term and meme of the same name. Before opening their roastery, Black Coffee NW used beans from Boon Boona Coffee, another Black-owned coffee company based in Washington.

The company participated in a "Black Black Friday" campaign organized by Seattle Black-owned businesses in 2023.

== History ==
=== Shoreline and North Seattle ===
Darnesha and Erwin Weary opened Black Coffee Northwest in Shoreline in October 2020. The business operated inside a building leased by Bethany Community Church.

Black Coffee Northwest has been subject to arson, theft, and vandalism. Ahead of the originally planned grand opening, a Molotov cocktail was thrown at the building. Two brothers were charged with unlawful possession of a destructive device. The business sought financial support from the community following the incident, and opened weeks later. In January 2021, a swastika was drawn on the cafe's exterior.

In November 2020, the cafe hosted a voter registration drive. The business had extended hours on Election Day and, according to Eater Seattle, offered "$0.45 off orders for customers who say that they've voted 45 out". In 2021, the business hosted an anniversary party and various activities leading up to Halloween. The business also hosted "Coffee Chats" and tutors for students.

Black Coffee Northwest had 14 employees, as of November 2021, most of whom were women of color.

The shop closed in June 2023, after the shop's landlord evicted them over more than $22,000 in missed rent. Owners cited the landlord and gentrification as reasons for the closure. They confirmed plans to continue operating and intend to open a shop in the Central District in 2023.

The business opened a second café in Ballard in 2022. As of 2023 the Ballard cafe is no longer in operation. As of January 2024, Black Coffee NW operates on the North Seattle College campus. The on campus café is known as Black Coffee Northwest at the Lily Pad Café.

=== Central District ===
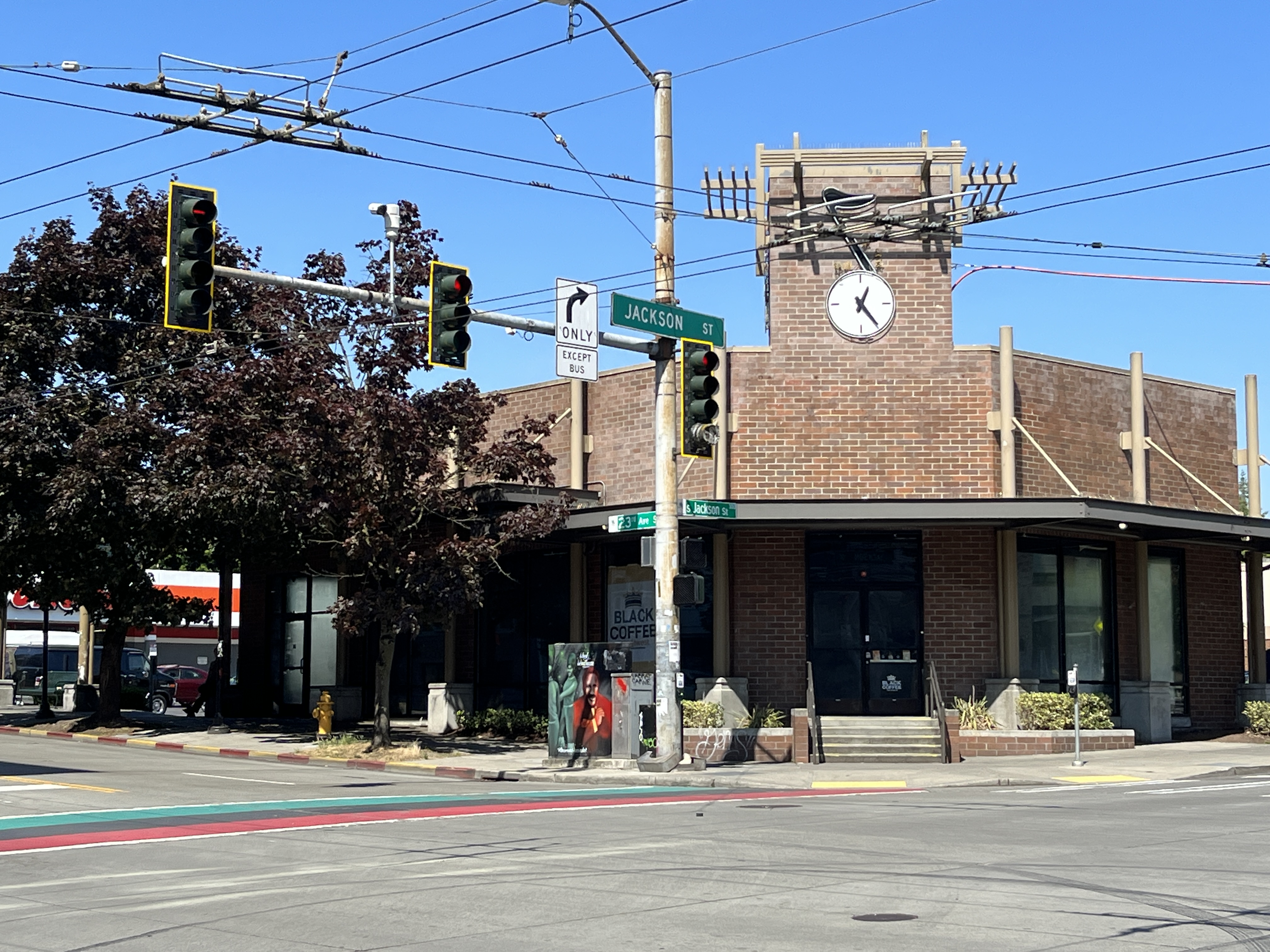
2023 photograph of the building in Seattle's Central District which Black Coffee Northwest plans to occupy, as evidenced by window signage

In 2023, Black Coffee Northwest announced plans to re-open in the Central District, in a building which previously was a Starbucks location.. This was part of a plan by Vulcan Real Estate to support black businesses in the neighborhood and make the intersection of 23rd & Jackson a hub for Seattle's black community. As of 2025, the cafe has not opened and the future of the Central District cafe remains uncertain.

== See also ==
- List of Black-owned restaurants
- List of coffeehouse chains
