= List of African restaurants =

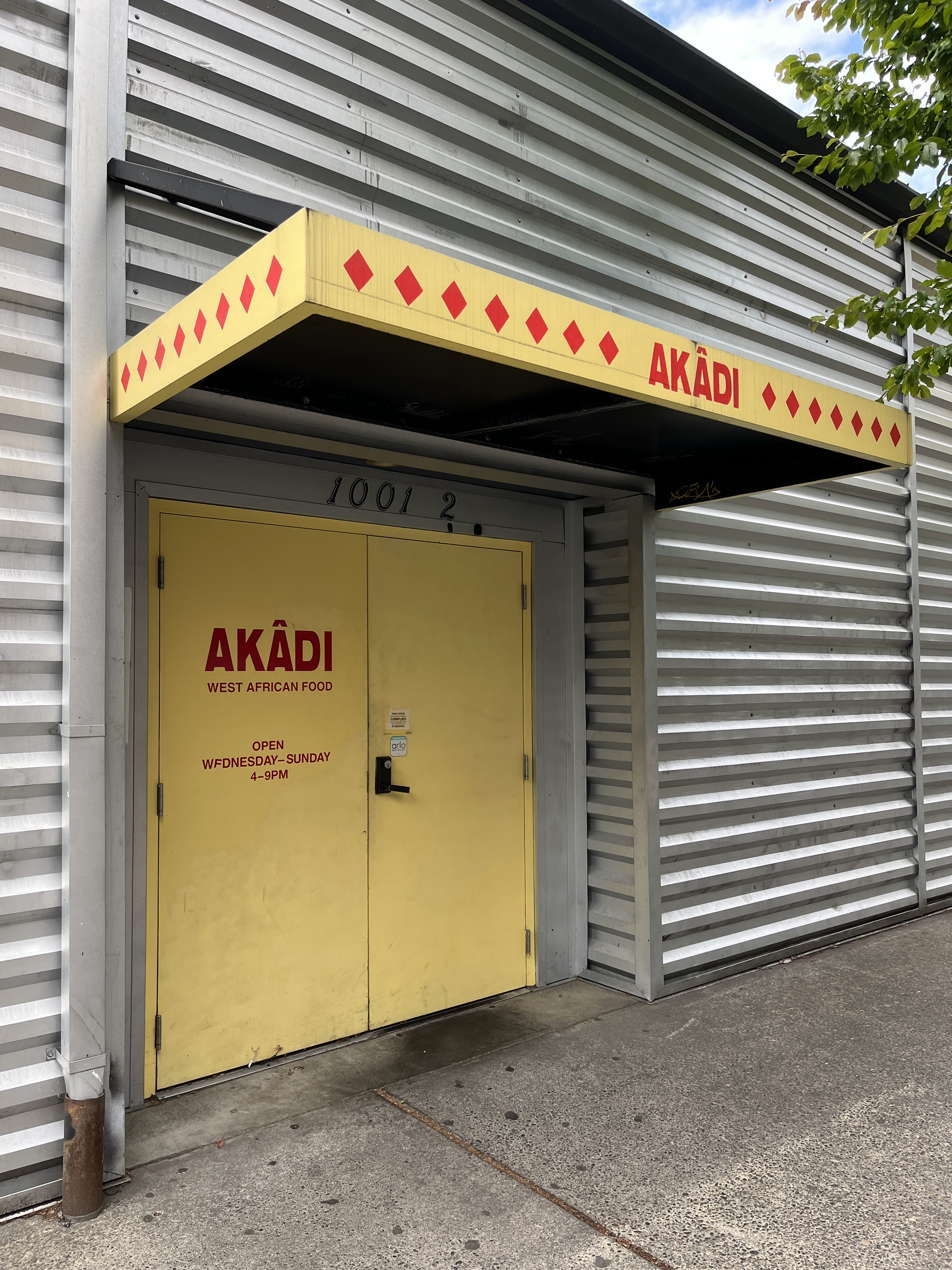
Exterior of Akadi in Portland, Oregon, in 2025

The following notable restaurants serve African cuisine:

- Abyssinian Kitchen – Portland, Oregon, U.S.
- Akoko, London, United Kingdom
- Akadi – Portland, Oregon
- Bintü Atelier, Charleston, South Carolina
- Chishuru, London
- Dōgon, Washington, D.C.
- Ikoyi, London
- Mourad – San Francisco, California
- Queen of Sheba – Portland, Oregon
