= Marjorie (restaurant) =

Restaurant in Seattle, Washington, U.S.

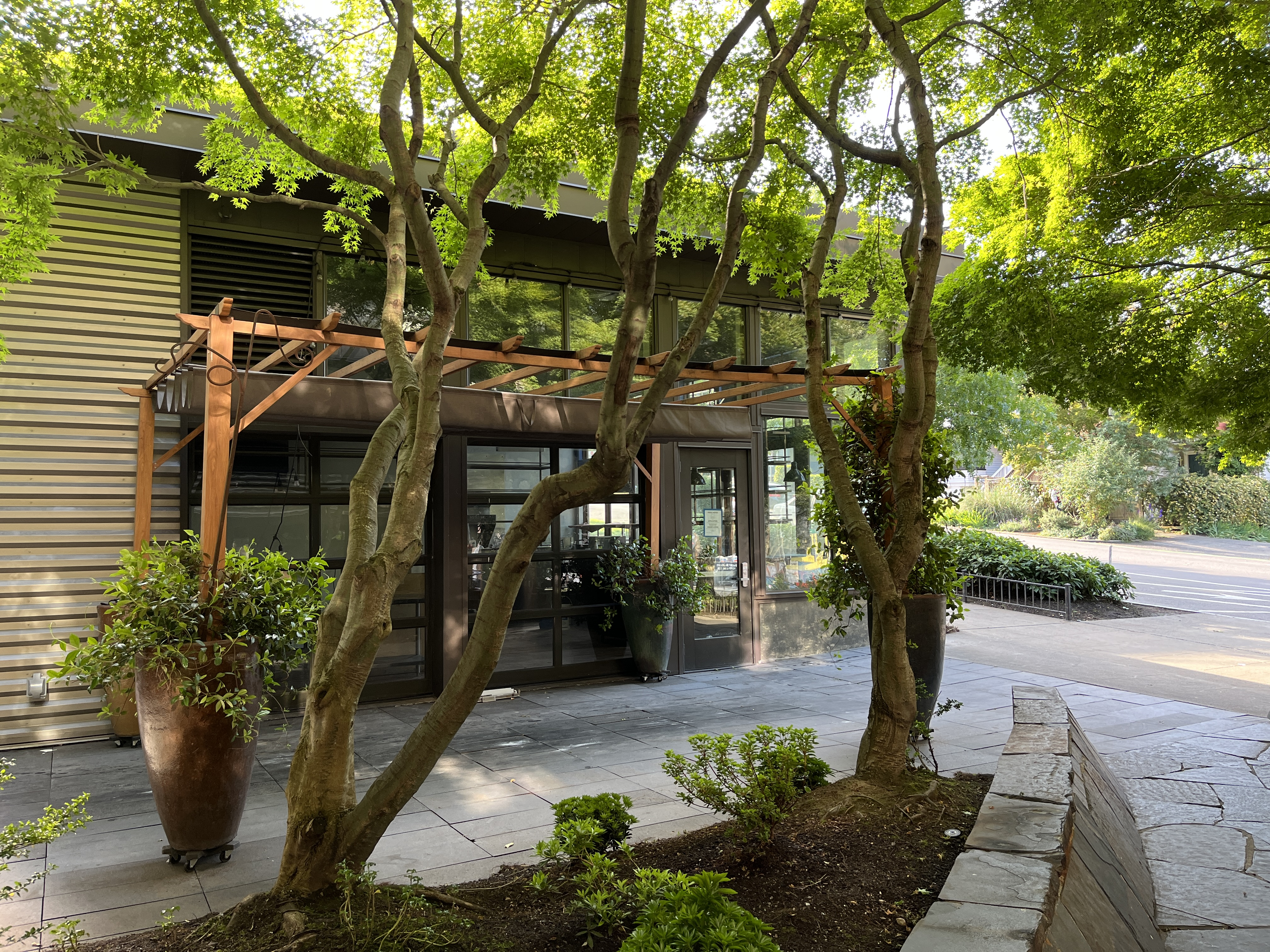
- Exterior of the building which housed Marjorie, June 2023
- Interactive map of Marjorie

Restaurant information
- Established: 2003
- Owner: Donna Moodie
- Location: Seattle, King, Washington, United States
- Coordinates: 47.6122°N 122.3019°W
- Website: marjorierestaurant.com

Marjorie is a restaurant in Seattle, in the U.S. state of Washington. The owner, Donna Moodie, operated the business in Belltown from 2003 to 2008, before relocating to Capitol Hill. The restaurant closed in 2023, but has re-opened at a new location (2301 E Union) with the same chef.

== Description ==
Marjorie is a Black- and woman-owned restaurant in Seattle, named after the owner's mother. Laurie Wolf said the restaurant has a "romantic and bustling" ambiance and a "moody and vibrant" interior.

The menu includes Jamaican-style jerk chicken, jalapeño hushpuppies, plantain chips, collard greens, sweet potatoes, and brioche bread pudding. The True Burger has beef topped with bone marrow aioli and harissa ketchup, and is served with French fries.

== History ==
Owner Donna Moodie opened the restaurant in Belltown in 2003. The location closed in late 2008, and later re-opened at the intersection of 14th and Union on Capitol Hill.

The restaurant's plantains were sold in store nationwide and online as Miss Marjorie's Steel Drum Plantains. Marjorie has used robots to package to-go meals in bowls and boxes.

The restaurant closed in March 2023. Marjorie has reopened at 23rd Ave and E. Union in the Central District.

=== Chefs ===
- Josh Davenport (2012)
- Joseph Bollag (2014)
- Challisa Parisi (mid 2015)
- Francisco Ruiz (2017)
- Cheyenne DeLoach (2023)

== Reception ==
Seattle Metropolitan said, "The menu plays globe-trotting homage to Italy (porchetta, housemade gnocchi), India (tikka masala chicken), and the American South (in the past, a juicy pork shank with grits and greens and red-eye gravy)".

Harry Cheadle and Jade Yamazaki Stewart included Marjorie in Eater Seattle's 2023 list of "Seattle Restaurants and Breweries with Great Patios for Outdoor Dining". Allecia Vermillion of Seattle Metropolitan said Marjorie was one of Seattle's most charming restaurants in 2023.

== See also ==
- List of Black-owned restaurants
