= Abyssinian Kitchen =

Restaurant in Portland, Oregon, U.S.

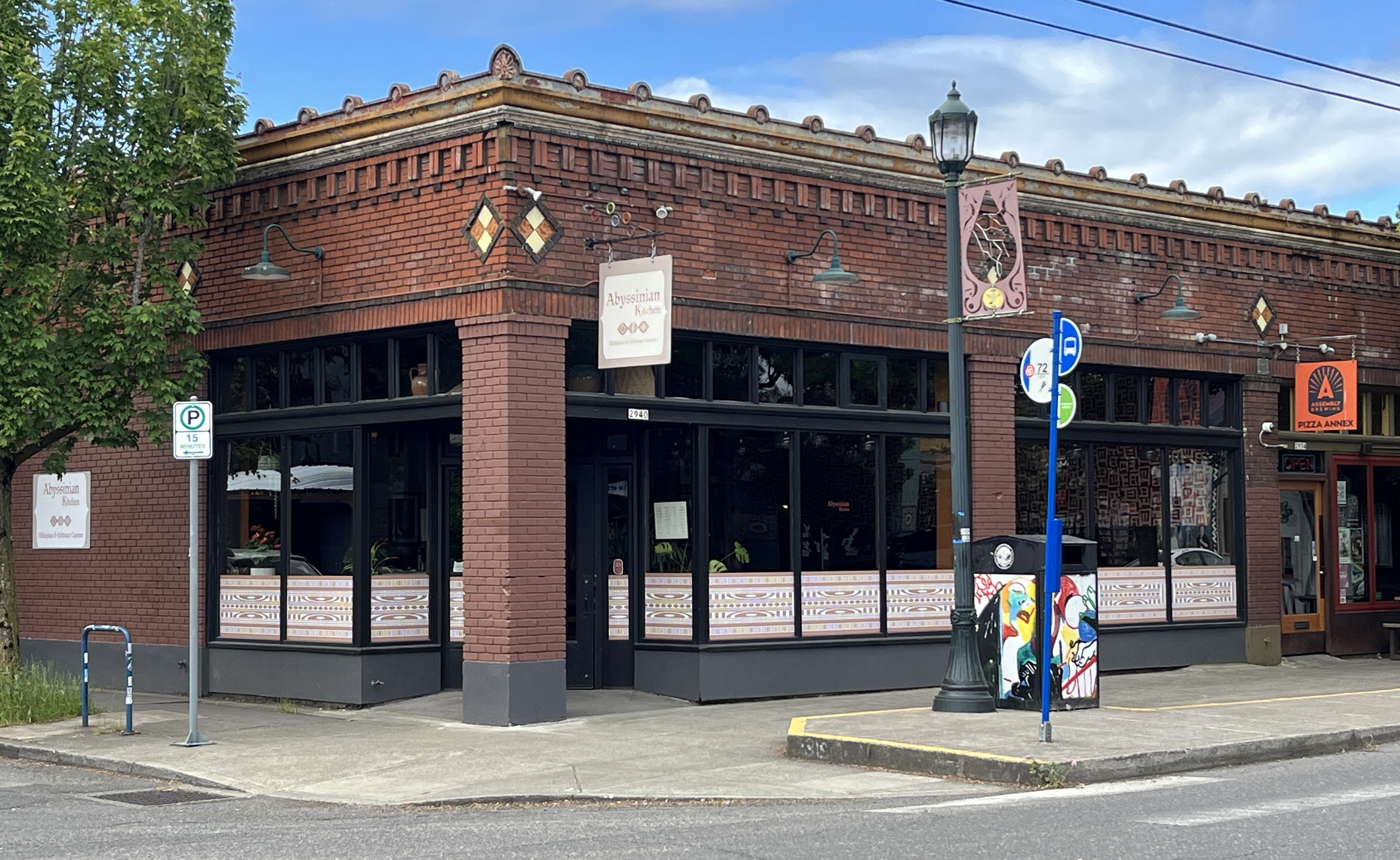
- The restaurant's exterior, 2025
- Interactive map of Abyssinian Kitchen

Restaurant information
- Food type: Ethiopian; Eritrean
- Location: 2940 Northeast Alberta Street, Portland, Multnomah, Oregon, 97211, United States
- Coordinates: 45.5589°N 122.63501°W
- Seating capacity: 150

Abyssinian Kitchen is an Ethiopian and Eritrean restaurant in Portland, Oregon, United States.

== Description ==
The restaurant's menu includes lamb in garlic and ginger and tilapia with serrano peppers; the vegetarian sampler has collards and lentils.

== History ==
Abyssinian Kitchen opened in southeast Portland's Hosford-Abernethy neighborhood in 2015. In 2020, the restaurant closed during the COVID-19 pandemic. The business reopened at a new location on Northeast Alberta Street in the Concordia neighborhood in August 2022.

== Reception ==
In 2016, Michael Russell included Abyssinian Kitchen in The Oregonian's list of the city's ten best new restaurants. He later included Abyssinian Kitchen in his 2017 overview of the 40 best restaurants in southeast Portland, and ranked Abyssinian Kitchen number 38 in his 2019 list of Portland's 40 best restaurants. Russell ranked the business number 23 in The Oregonian's 2025 list of Portland's 40 best restaurants.

In 2017, Martin Cizmar included Abyssinian Kitchen in Willamette Week's list of Best Restaurants on Portland's Division and Clinton Streets. In 2019, Alex Zielinski of the Portland Mercury wrote, "The tangy, fresh, and filling plates are enough to keep curious first-timers coming back for seconds." Maya MacEvoy included the restaurant in Eater Portland's 2022 overview of "exceptional" Ethiopian food in the city.

== See also ==
- List of African restaurants
