= Café Avole =

Coffee company based in Seattle, Washington, U.S.

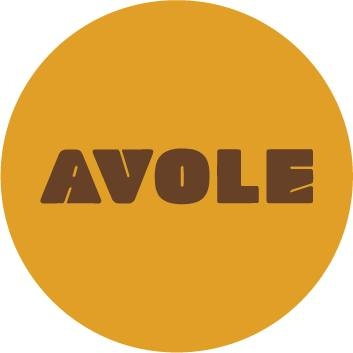

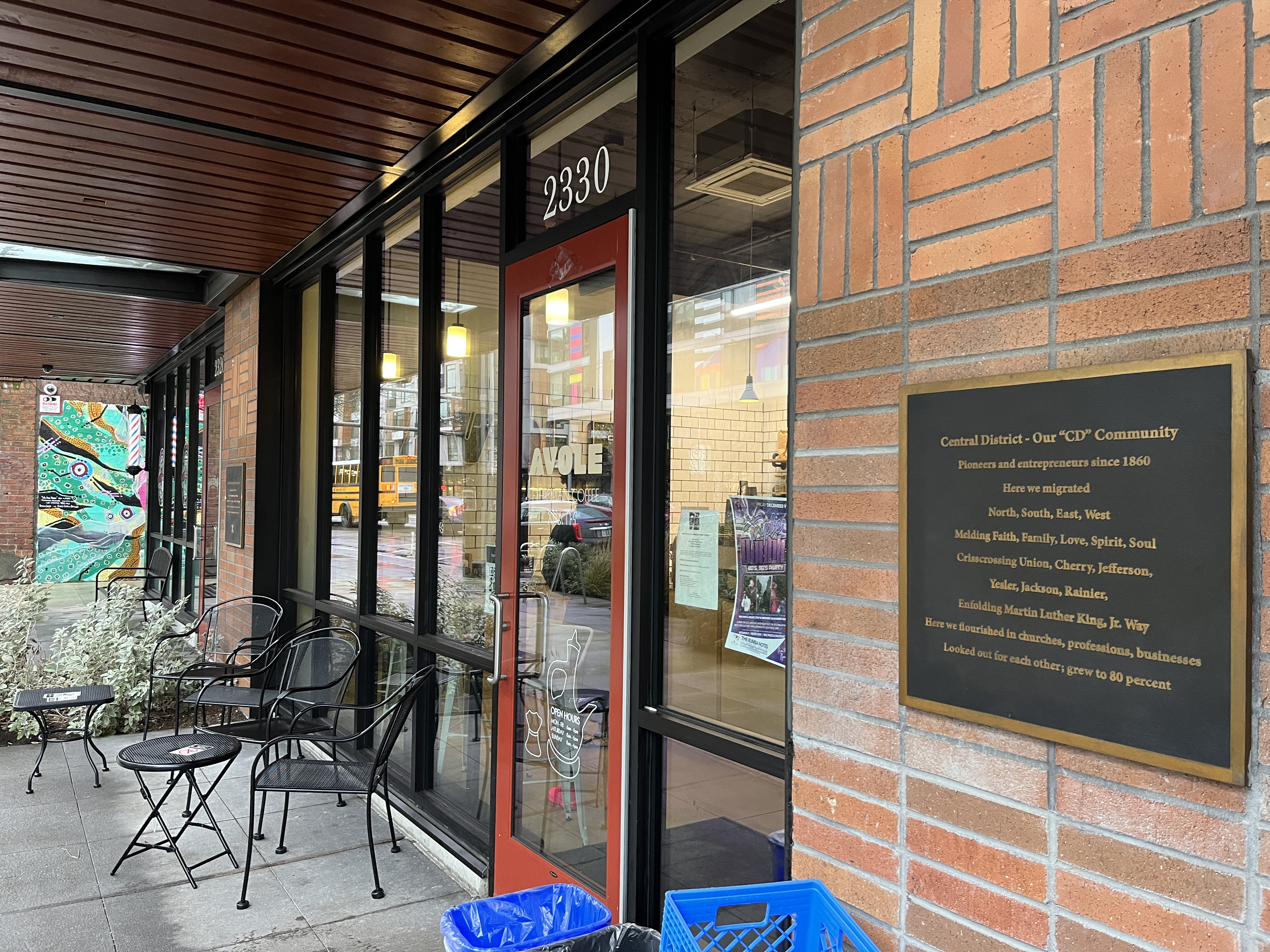
- Exterior of the Central District shop in 2023

Restaurant information
- Location: Seattle, King, Washington, United States

Café Avole, also known as Avole Coffee, is a coffee roasting company that also operates two coffee shops in Seattle, in the U.S. state of Washington. The business launched in Brighton, and operates on East Union Street in the Central District, and on Rainier Avenue South in Rainier Valley.

== Description ==
The Central District location operates in the Liberty Bank Building. The Rainier Valley location operates in a former convenience store, attached to the Ethiopian Community Center. Coffee drinks use Ethiopian coffee. The drink menu includes a lavender latte and iced drinks such as the Genesee Tea, which has black tea, lemon, and blueberry syrup. The food menu includes vegetable sambusas; ful medames is among breakfast options.

== History ==
Co-founded and co-owned by Solomon Dubie, the business launched in Brighton and later expanded to the Central District. Gavin Amos and Getachew Enbiale are also co-owners. The Brighton location closed. The Black-owned business has supplied Africa Lounge at Seattle–Tacoma International Airport. According to Tasting Table, Avole "works with local farmers, contributes to various philanthropic pursuits, and participates in community outreach".

== Reception ==
Avole was included in Tasting Table's 2022 list of the city's seventeen best coffee roasters other than Starbucks. In 2023, Allecia Vermillion and Agazit Afeworki included Avole in Seattle Metropolitan's overview of the city's best Ethiopian and Eritrean restaurants.

== See also ==
- Coffee production in Ethiopia
- List of Black-owned restaurants
