= Akadi =

West African restaurant in Portland, Oregon, U.S.

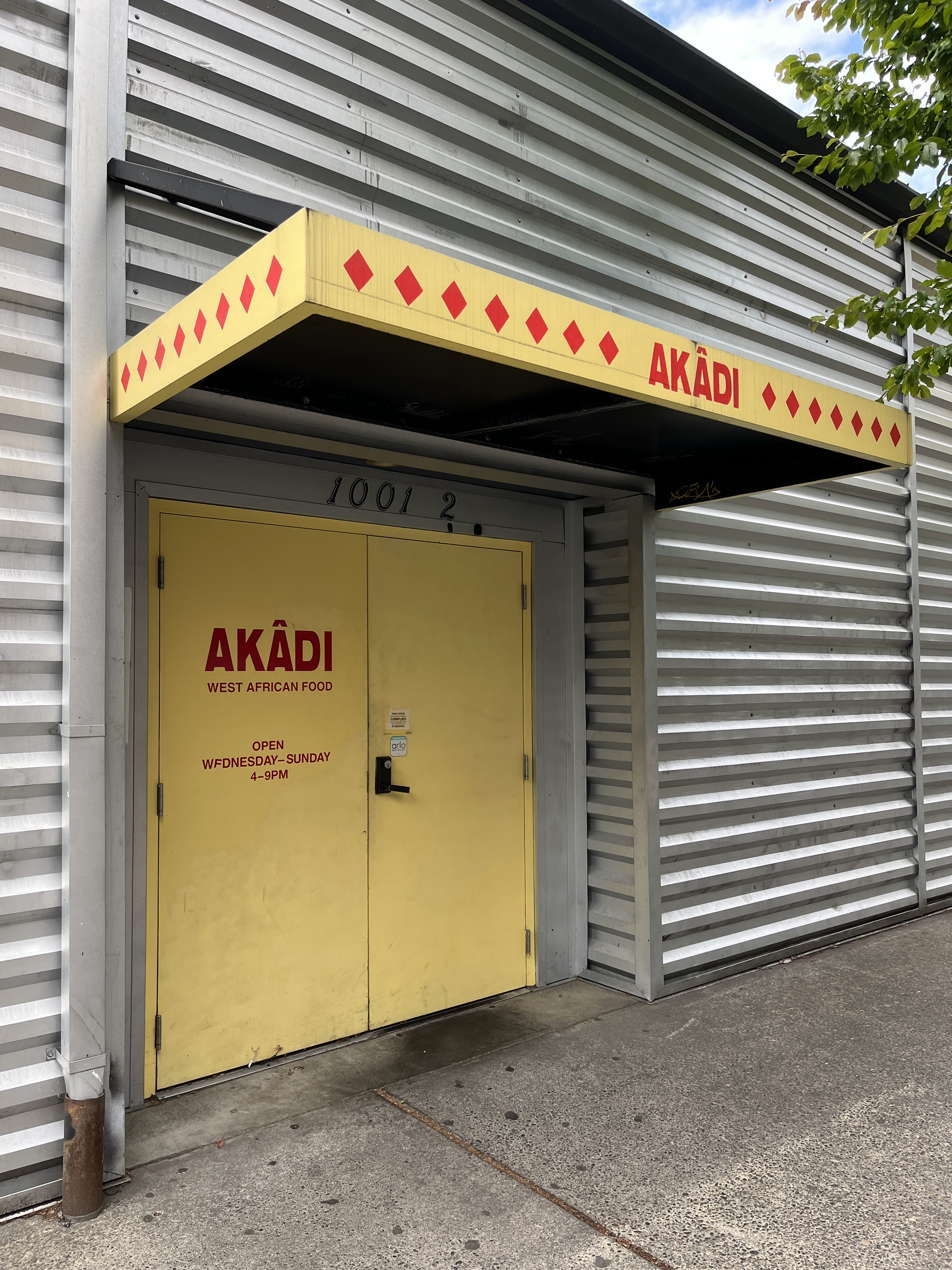
- The restaurant's exterior in 2025
- Interactive map of Akadi

Restaurant information
- Owner: Fatou Ouattara
- Chef: Fatou Ouattara
- Food type: West African
- Location: 1001 Southeast Division Street, Portland, Multnomah, Oregon, 97202, United States
- Coordinates: 45.5050683°N 122.6554112°W
- Website: akadipdx.com

Akadi is a Black-owned, West African restaurant in Portland, Oregon, United States. Fatou Ouattara is the chef and owner.

== Description ==
The menu specializes in cuisine from Burkina Faso and the Ivory Coast, and has seafood and vegetarian options. Options include chicken wings, fried plantains, plantain fufu, and stews.

== History ==
Akadi originally operated at 3601 Northeast Martin Luther King Jr. Boulevard in the Boise neighborhood. During the COVID-19 pandemic, business had declined by 50 percent, as of July 2020. In December 2020, Ouattara confirmed plans to close temporarily on December 31. Akadi reopened in southeast Portland's Hosford-Abernethy neighborhood in May 2022, along with its sister business, House of Flavor.

== Reception ==
In 2018, Akadi was named one of Portland’s Best New Restaurants by Portland Monthly. The magazine's Alex Frane and Jordan Michelman included the business in a 2026 list of the city's best chicken wings. In 2019, Michael Russell included Akadi in The Oregonian's list of the city's 10 best new restaurants. He later included the business in the newspaper's 2025 list of the 21 best restaurants in southeast Portland. Russell ranked Akadi number 39 in The Oregonian's 2025 list of Portland's 40 best restaurants.

In 2020, Eater Portland's Brooke Jackson-Glidden said the Attieke Poisson Braisé was "one of the top dishes in Northeast Portland" and also recommended the goat pepper soup and mafe. The website's Waz Wu included Akadi in a 2023 list of "Portland’s Primo Special Occasion Restaurants for Vegans and Vegetarians". Akadi was included in The Infatuation's 2024 list of Portland's best restaurants. The business was included in Time Out Portland's 2025 list of the city's eighteen best restaurants. Hannah Wallace included the business in Condé Nast Traveler's 2025 list of Portland's 23 best restaurants.

== See also ==
- List of African restaurants
- List of Black-owned restaurants
