= Fat Cupcake =

Cupcake shop in the U.S. state of Oregon

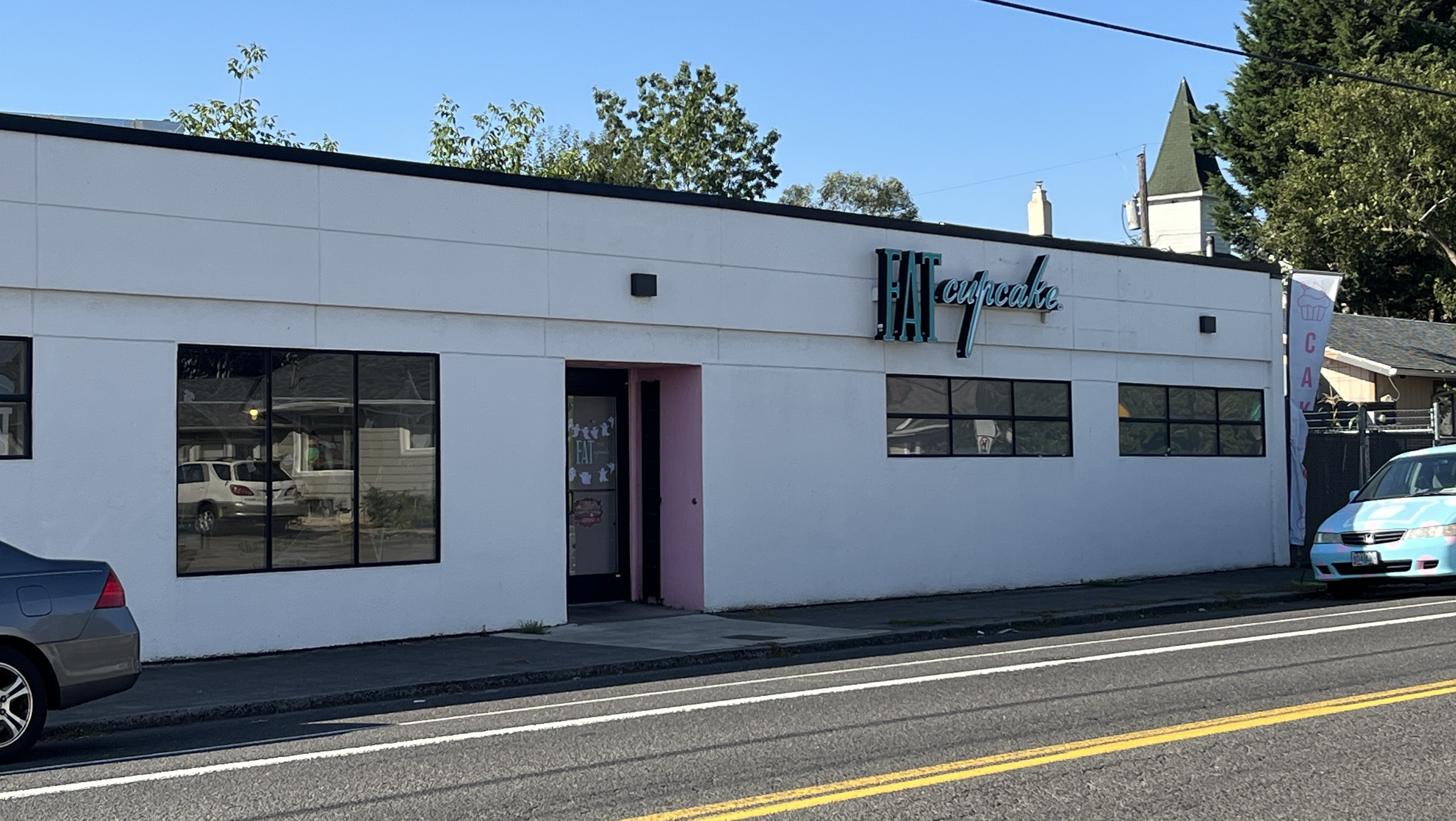
- Exterior of the shop in southeast Portland, Oregon, 2025
- Interactive map of Fat Cupcake

Restaurant information
- Established: 2014
- Owner: Anjelica Hayes
- Location: Happy Valley; Oregon City; Portland, Oregon, United States
- Coordinates: 45.4792°N 122.5728°W
- Website: fatcupcake.com

Fat Cupcake is a cupcake shop in the Portland metropolitan area, in the U.S. state of Oregon. The business originated in Oregon City in 2014 and has also operated in Happy Valley and southeast Portland.

== Description ==
Fat Cupcake is a Black-owned cupcake business in the Portland metropolitan area. Fat Cupcake operates a shop on Woodstock Boulevard between 87th Avenue and 88th Avenue in southeast Portland's Lents neighborhood. The business also operates in Happy Valley and Oregon City.

Fat Cupcake offers various cakes and cupcakes with names like the Good Gracious, the Mona Lisa, and the Suit & Tie. The Breakup is a chocolate cake with chocolate ganache and mousse. The Charlie Brown is a chocolate cake with a Reese's Peanut Butter Cup baked into the center and peanut butter buttercream frosting. The Twinkle Sprinkle is a white cake with raspberry filling and sprinkle vanilla buttercream. Cake options include one shaped like a llama and another with ombre rosettes. Other varieties have included chocolate with espresso mousse and pink champagne with vanilla buttercream. Fat Cupcake also has wheat-free and vegan options.

== History ==
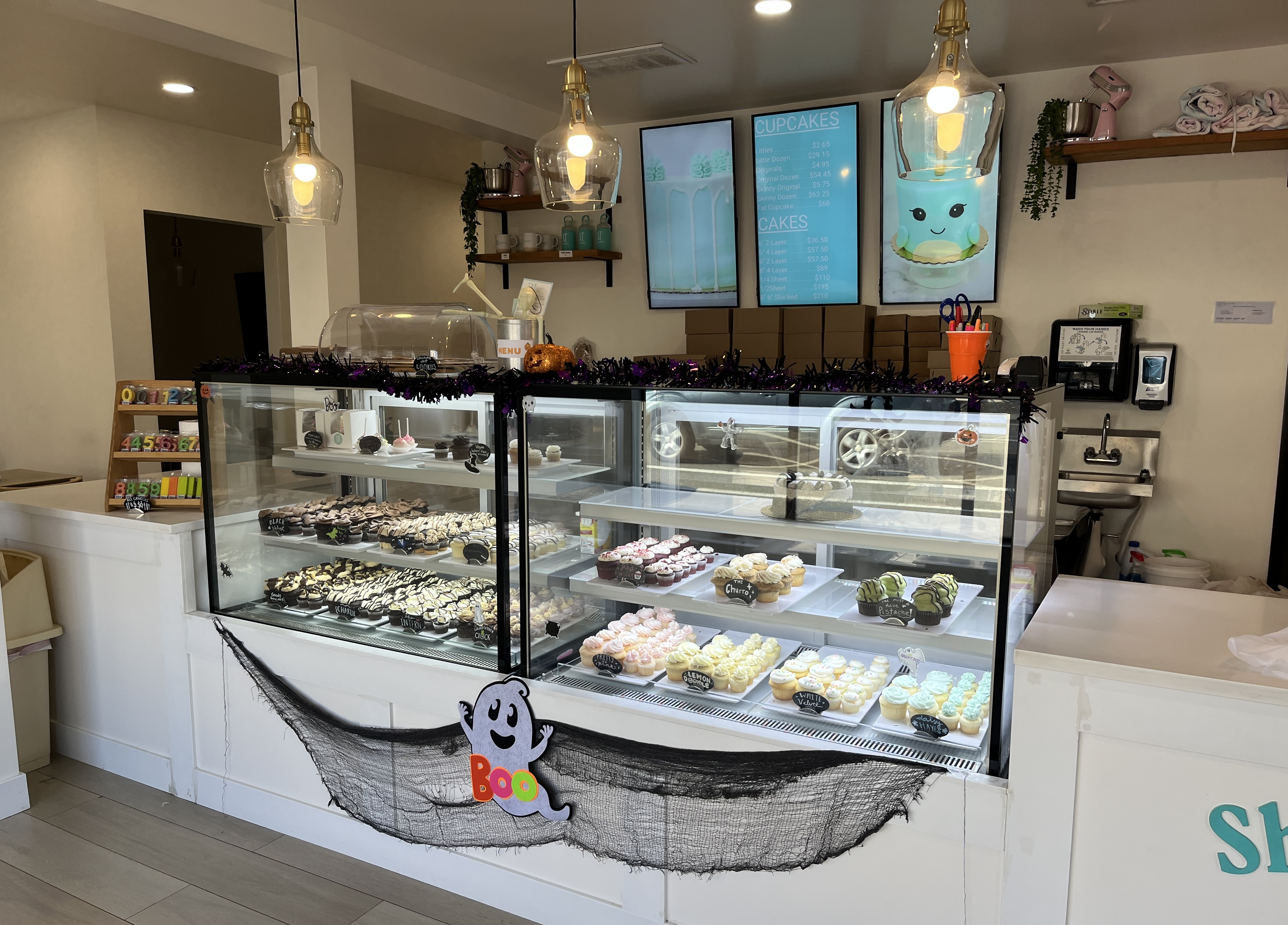
Interior of the shop in southeast Portland, Oregon in 2025

Fat Cupcake is owned by Anjelica Hayes. The business started in Oregon City in 2014.

The business began operating in Lents in 2016. Previously, the business operated at a different location. In September 2016, Fat Cupcake received some criticism for offering the Mr. President, described as an "Oreo () Cookie baked inside white cake, cookies n' cream buttercream". The cupcake was renamed The Professional and is among the shop's most popular varieties, according to Hayes.

Customers can get a free cupcake on their birthday. Fat Cupcake's Peace of Cake program donates cupcakes to people experiencing homelessness. In 2023, the business participated in the Foodie Passport program launched by the Black Business Association of Oregon and the food delivery company DoorDash.

== Reception ==
In 2020, USA Today included Fat Cupcake for Oregon in a list of "highly-rated" Black-owned restaurants in each U.S. state, based on Yelp reviews. Kate Patterson included Fat Cupcake in The Franklin Post's 2021 overview of Portland's best cupcakes.

== See also ==
- List of bakeries
- List of Black-owned restaurants
- List of restaurant chains in the United States
