= Bomb Biscuits =

Restaurant in Atlanta, Georgia, U.S.

- Interactive map of Bomb Biscuits

Restaurant information
- Established: September 2022
- Owner: Erika Council
- Chef: Erika Council
- Food type: Southern
- Location: 668 Highland Avenue NE, Atlanta, Georgia, United States
- Coordinates: 33°45′41.3″N 84°21′55.5″W
- Website: bombbiscuitatl.com

Bomb Biscuits is a Southern restaurant in Atlanta, Georgia, United States. It is known for serving biscuits, breakfast sandwiches, and other brunch items.

== History ==
The restaurant was founded by head chef Erika Council, a former software engineer. She learned to cook from her paternal grandmother Mildred "Mama Dip" Council, owner of Mama Dip’s Country Kitchen in Chapel Hill, North Carolina, and her maternal grandmother civil rights activist Geraldine Dortch. Council began hosting supper parties in Atlanta in 2018. She then began operating Bomb Biscuits as a pop-up restaurant in 2017. During the COVID-19 pandemic, Bomb Biscuit began delivering food.

Council opened a food stall at the Irwin Street Market in 2021, before moving the restaurant into a permanent location on Highland Avenue in 2022. The restaurant ships items nationwide.

The Restaurant was awarded a Michelin Bib Gourmand and its owner named a 2024 James Beard semifinalist.

=== Menu ===
The restaurant's menu is based around brunch, serving biscuits, cinnamon rolls, and breakfast items including fried chicken and catfish, grits, pancakes, hash browns, and breakfast sandwiches. It is known for serving the SEC ("sausage, egg, and American cheese") sandwich. Its drink menu includes sweet tea, local coffee, fruit juice, and soda.

== Reception ==
In 2024, Bomb Biscuits was included in the Michelin Guide. It was included in The New York Times's 2023 list of the 50 best restaurants in the United States.

== See also ==
- List of Black-owned restaurants
- List of Michelin Bib Gourmand restaurants in the United States
- List of Southern restaurants
