= Bird Pizzeria =

Pizzeria in Charlotte, North Carolina, U.S.

- Interactive map of Bird Pizzeria

Restaurant information
- Location: 510 East 15th Street, Charlotte, North Carolina, 28206, United States
- Coordinates: 35.2328°N 80.8256°W
- Website: birdpizzeria.com

Bird Pizzeria is a pizzeria in Charlotte, North Carolina. The Black-owned business was included in The New York Times's 2024 list of the 22 best pizzerias in the U.S.

== See also ==
- List of Black-owned restaurants
