= Olive or Twist =

Cocktail bar in Portland, Oregon, U.S.

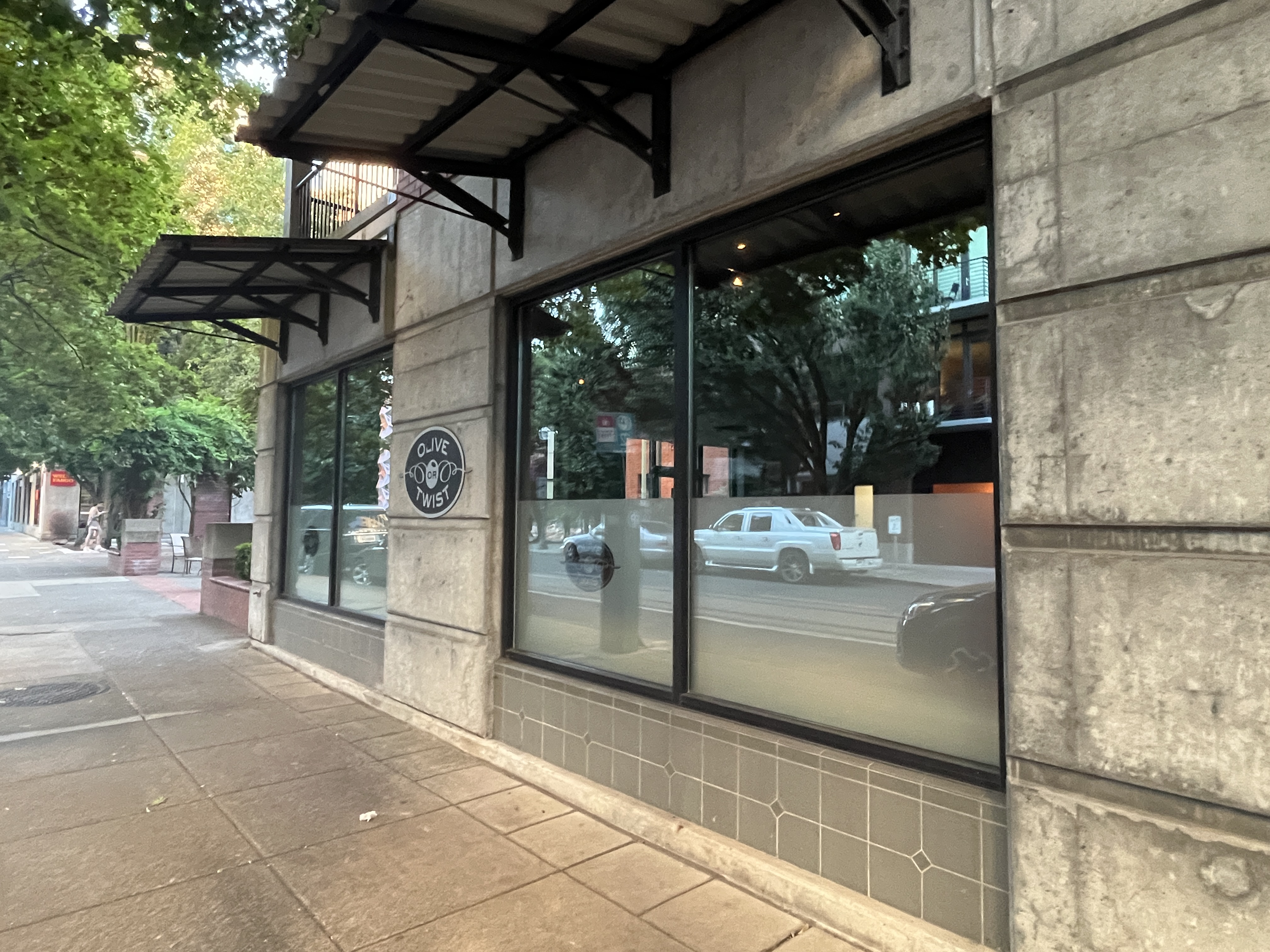
- The bar's exterior, 2022
- Interactive map of Olive or Twist

Restaurant information
- Owner: Sam Fowler
- Location: 925 Northwest 11th Avenue, Portland, Multnomah, Oregon, 97209, United States
- Coordinates: 45.5296°N 122.6825°W

Olive or Twist (sometimes Olive or Twist Martini Bar) is a cocktail bar in Portland, Oregon's Pearl District, in the United States.

== Description ==
Olive or Twist is a cocktail bar in northwest Portland's Pearl District. According to Portland Monthly, the bar's name references "the Dickensian heyday of gin, as well as the two most common martini garnishes". The interior, described by the magazine as "understated", has low lighting and shades of beige, charcoal, and gray. The bar's floor-to-ceiling windows are partly frosted. The Rose City Martini has cucumber-infused Hendrick's gin, rose water, and lime. The Peruvian includes pepper vodka, mango, lime, and chiles as a garnish.

== History ==
Olive or Twist is owned by Sam Fowler. The bar was referenced in a 2015 episode of the television series Grimm.

Olive or Twist has been included in local lists of Black-owned businesses. In 2021, Olive or Twist was described as one of the city's oldest Black-owned businesses. For more than a decade, the bar hosted Da Gathering, a "casual" event for Black male professionals "to meet people with similar experiences, purposefully devoid of the formalities of a networking or career mixer".

Following protests in the city over the murder of George Floyd, Fowler said: "Some of those activities have hijacked the message. When I hear people talk about all the issues that were going on last summer in particular with the BLM, the violence had nothing to do with BLM. I just wanted to make sure people realize that they're like two factions. But once again, how do we get people that think breaking my window is going to solve a problem—how do we get them to the table? ... We did have to come to a reckoning. That's unfortunate, but sometimes that's what it takes. And like I said I just hope that as we come out on the other side, that it will be better."

== Reception ==
Portland Monthly said "Olive or Twist asserts itself like an impeccable—but very opinionated—host" and "the low noise level make Olive or Twist a nightspot for unwinding in relative seclusion without leaving the downtown scene". In 2015, Portland Business Journal readers voted Olive or Twist the best-named bar in Portland. Atlas Obscura editors also selected the bar for a 2015 list of establishments with the best pun names.

== See also ==
- List of Black-owned restaurants
