= Jones Bar-B-Q Diner =

Barbecue restaurant in Arkansas, US

Coordinates: 34°46′06″N 90°45′54″W

- Industry: restaurant
- Founded: 1910s
- Headquarters: Marianna, Arkansas
- Products: barbecue

Jones Bar-B-Q Diner is a barbecue joint in Marianna, Arkansas, US, that has been open since at least the 1910s. According to business guide Black Business, it is believed to be the country's oldest black-owned restaurant. In 2012 it was recognized by the James Beard Foundation as an "American Classic".

== History ==
The smoking business was first started by the current owner's grandfather's uncle, Joe. The exact year it opened is disputed; Garden & Gun specified 1910 when naming it to their Barbecue Bucket List. The Beard Foundation said it had been open "since at least the 1910s." According to the Encyclopedia of Arkansas, it "is perhaps the oldest continuously operating restaurant in Arkansas, as well as perhaps the oldest continuously operating restaurant in the South owned by a black family." According to Oxford American, it is "the oldest black-owned restaurant in the South, and, perhaps, one of the oldest family-owned black restaurants in the nation." According to business guide Black Business, it is "believed to be the oldest black-owned restaurant in the country." According to Southern Foodways Alliance, "there are some people who believe it's the oldest continually operated African American-owned restaurant in the South." According to The Chicago Tribune, "Food historians say it may be one of the nation’s oldest restaurants owned by an African American family."

Joe's nephew, Walter Jones, originally served barbecue on Fridays and Saturdays from the back porch of his dogtrot house. Walter's son recalled in a 1986 interview that the first pit setup was "a hole in the ground, some iron pipes and a piece of fence wire, and two pieces of tin."

The next owner was Walter's son, Hubert Jones. Hubert's son told Saveur that his father's original place was called The Hole in the Wall, because "that's what it was. Just a window in a wall where they sold meat from a washtub." Hubert moved the business to its current location in 1964 and changed its name to Jones Bar-B-Q.

The next and current owner is Hubert's son, James Jones, and his wife Betty. In 2010 James Jones told Oxford American that his son, a local coach, was not planning to continue operating the business.

In 2017 James Jones shared his recipes and permission to use the business name with Kevin Arnold, who opened a Jones Bar-B-Q in Jacksonville, Arkansas, about 100 miles (160 km) away. In 2021, a grease fire destroyed 70% of the restaurant's building. The owners vowed to rebuild the place with fire-resistant metal instead of wood.

== Operation ==
The Marianna diner is located in a white cinder block two-story shotgun house on a corner lot at 219 West Louisiana Street. Hubert Jones and his wife lived upstairs when they operated it.

Jones smokes 10 to 12 pork shoulders over oak and hickory in cinder-block pits for at least ten hours three times a week. He simmers the cooked meat in sauce in a slow cooker. The sauce is thin and vinegar-based and contains paprika and cayenne. The menu offers only chopped pork, either by the pound or as sandwiches on white bread such as Wonder or Sunbeam, with or without a mustard-based coleslaw. As of August 2019, sandwiches were US$3.50, a pound of meat US$7.00 and a pint of sauce US$3.00.

The diner opens at 6 a.m. six days a week and closes whenever it sells out, often by 11 a.m. According to The Chicago Tribune, "On a summer Saturday, that could happen before 10 a.m." There are only two tables, providing seating for at most ten.

As of 2010 the restaurant offered smoking service to hunters who would bring their catches in.

== Recognition ==
- 2012: America's Classics by the James Beard Foundation (Arkansas' first Beard Award winner)
- 2017: Inducted into the inaugural class of the Arkansas Food Hall of Fame
- 2019: Best barbecue in Arkansas by Food & Wine

== See also ==
- List of Black-owned restaurants
