= The Original Philly's =

Restaurant in Seattle, Washington, U.S.

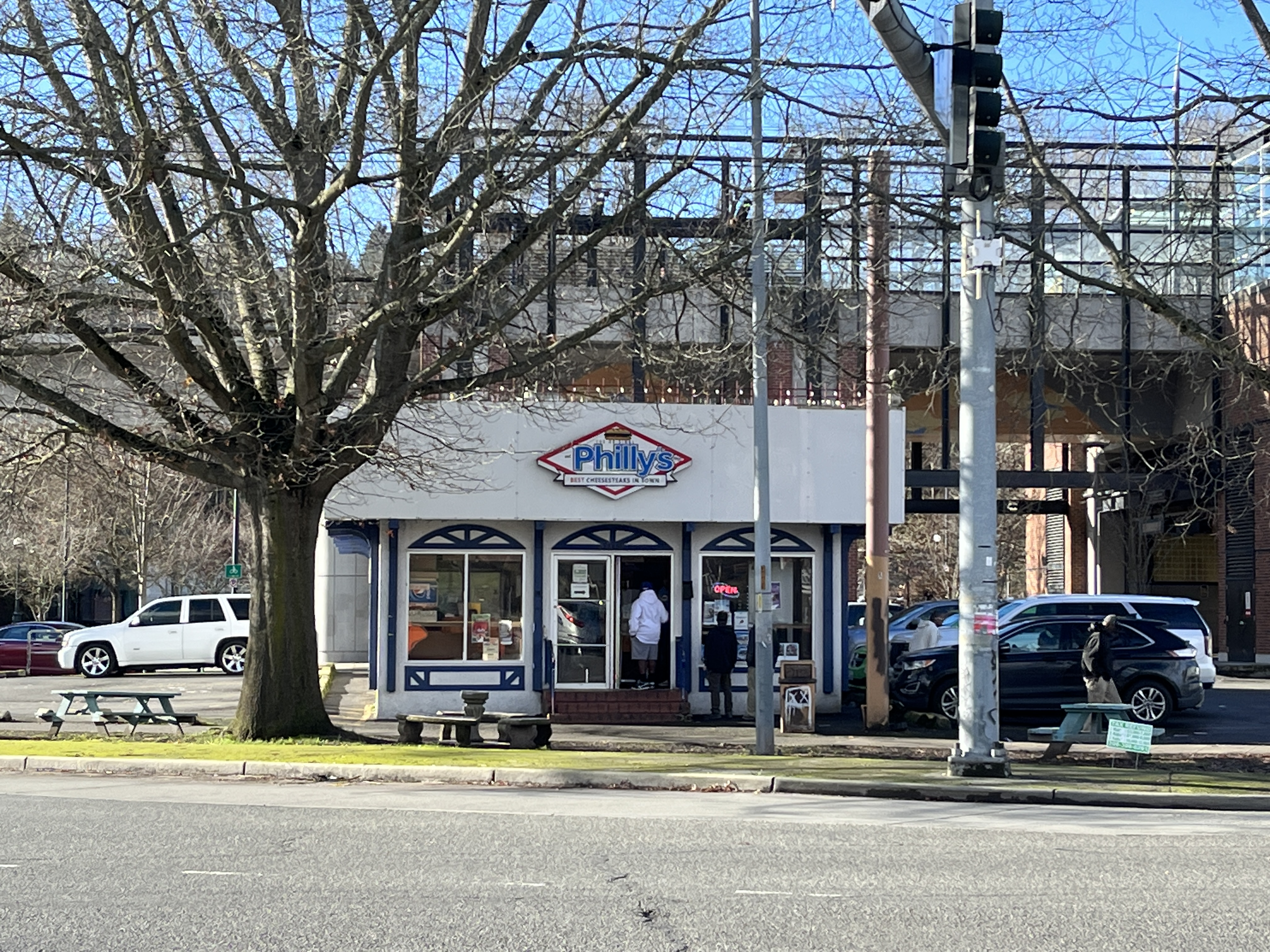
- The restaurant's exterior, 2023
- Interactive map of The Original Philly's

Restaurant information
- Location: 3019 Martin Luther King Jr Way South, Seattle, King, Washington, 98144, United States
- Coordinates: 47.5763°N 122.2970°W
- Website: theoriginalphillys.com

The Original Philly's (or simply Philly’s) is a restaurant in Seattle, in the U.S. state of Washington.

== Description ==
Located in Seattle's Mount Baker neighborhood, The Original Philly's (or simply Philly's) is a Black- and woman-owned restaurant specializing in cheesesteaks. Thrillist has described the business as a "hole-in-the-wall spot" with a Ms. Pac-Man machine. The menu has also included "pizza" chicken, cold cut hoagies, and cheesy French fries. According to Kristina Rivera of the South Seattle Emerald, sandwiches "range from the traditional Philly's Style Cheesesteak, to Pepper Cheese Steak, to the Chicken Cheese Hoagie, and Veggie Deluxe".

== History ==
The Original Philly's was established by Charles and Minerva Humphrie in 1995.

In 2005, the restaurant relocated to its current location on Martin Luther King Jr. Way and Guy Thomas joined the business. The Seattle-based hip hop duo Blue Scholars gives a "shout out" to The Original Philly's in the music video for "Slick Watts".

In 2020, approximately 60 people gathered outside the restaurant for an event with a program called " Who's Next? We Want to Live". Organized by community groups "that support youth and work to keep Black and brown kids out of the criminal justice system", the event saw six Black men carry a casket.

In 2021, the business was a vendor at the Day In Day Out Festival, described by Ronnie Estoque of the South Seattle Emerald as "a small-scale music festival organized by Daydream State".

== Reception ==
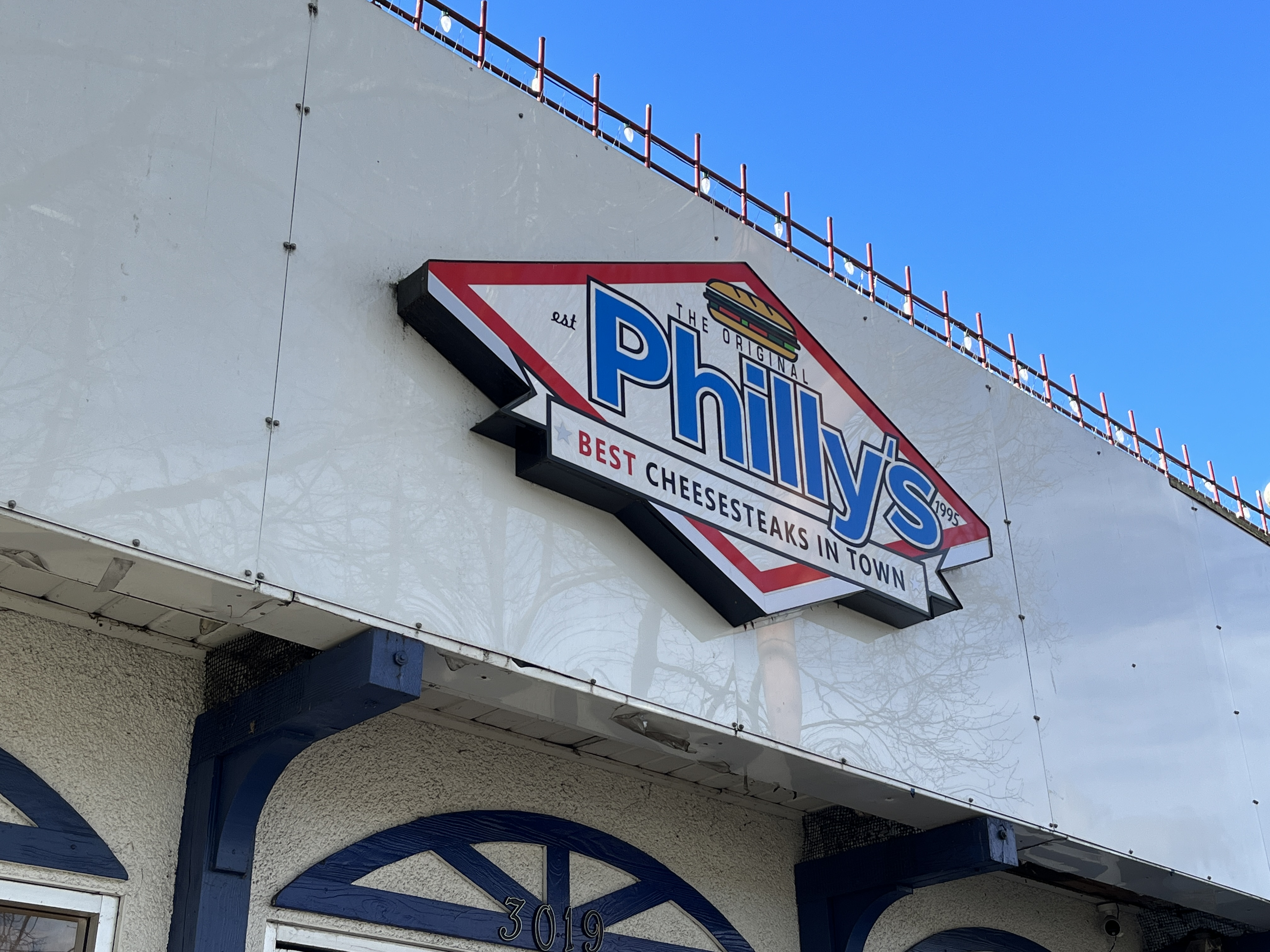
Sign in 2023

In 2013, Nancy Leson of The Seattle Times said of The Original Philly's: "Loud, unkempt and slow. My order (three half-sandwiches) took more than 30 minutes to fulfill. I should have had a beer. But I later shared the goods with my South Jersey cohort who deemed the meld of meat, cheese and peppers a righteous reproduction of the real deal. Verdict: Call ahead for takeout and have the 'Deluxe,' stuffed with hoagie-fied garnishes plus mushrooms, peppers and onions." Chona Kasinger included the business in Thrillist's 2015 overview of "where to get Seattle's best cheesesteaks".

Seattle Metropolitan included The Original Philly's in a 2021 list of "8 Restaurants to Try in Southeast Seattle" and said, "The pepper cheesesteak is legendary." Eater Seattle included the business in a 2022 overview of "where to order some of Seattle's most sensational sandwiches".

== See also ==
- List of Black-owned restaurants
