= Lil Red Takeout and Catering =

Restaurant in Seattle, Washington, U.S.

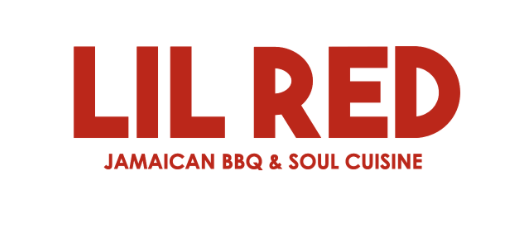
- Interactive map of Lil Red Takeout and Catering

Restaurant information
- Owner: Erasto Jackson
- Food type: Jamaican
- Location: 4225 Rainier Avenue South, Seattle, King, Washington, 98118, United States
- Coordinates: 47.5648°N 122.2888°W

Lil Red Takeout and Catering (also known as Lil Red Jamaican BBQ and Soul Cuisine, Lil Red's Takeout and Catering, or simply Lil Red), is a Jamaican restaurant in Seattle's Columbia City / Rainier Valley area, in the U.S. state of Washington. Erasto Jackson is the owner.

== Description ==
Lil Red is a Black-owned, counter service barbecue restaurant on Rainier Avenue South in the Columbia City / Rainier Valley area of Seattle. The menu has included brisket, fish or pork ribs, jerk chicken, yams, collard greens, macaroni and cheese, mashed potatoes, cornbread, and lemon buttermilk pie. The restaurant has also served oxtail, snapper, wings, and house-smoked bacon and sausages, roast beef, and a fried bologna sandwich.

== Reception ==
Adrian Miller has called Lil Red one of the best Black-owned barbecue establishments in the U.S. In Seattle Metropolitan's 2022 list of the city's best barbecue, Allecia Vermillion called Lil Red "one of the city's most exciting destinations for smoked meat". Jackson was nominated for a James Beard Foundation Award for Best Chef (Northwest and Pacific). In 2023, Lil Red was included in The New York Times's list of Seattle's 25 best restaurants.

== See also ==
- List of barbecue restaurants
- List of Black-owned restaurants
