= Assembly Brewing =

Defunct brewery and restaurant in Portland, Oregon, U.S.

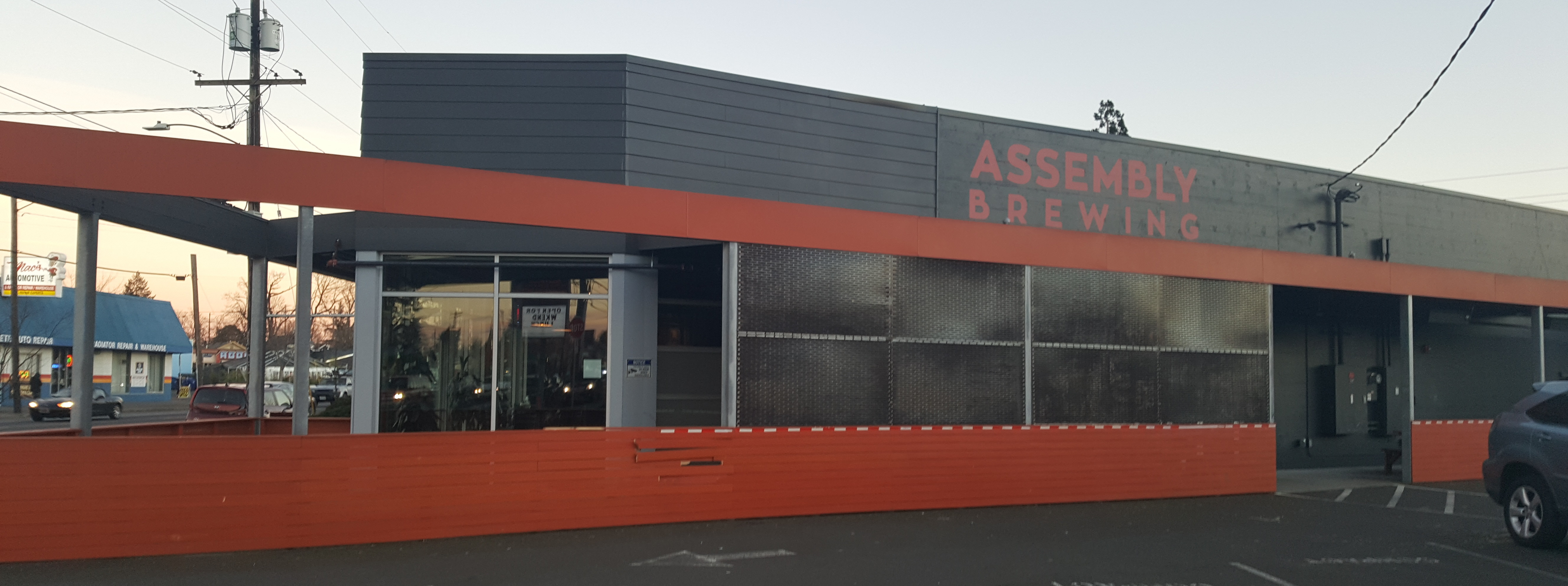
- The restaurant's exterior in 2022
- Interactive map of Assembly Brewing

Restaurant information
- Location: 6112 Southeast Foster Road, Portland, Multnomah, Oregon, 97206, United States
- Coordinates: 45.4909°N 122.6004°W
- Website: assemblybrewingco.com

Assembly Brewing was a brewery and restaurant in Portland, Oregon, United States. The business operated two brick and mortar locations: the original restaurant was in southeast Portland's Mt. Scott-Arleta neighborhood and the outpost known as Pizza Annex was on Alberta Street in northeast Portland's Concordia neighborhood. Before closing two locations permanently in 2025, Assembly was Oregon's only Black-owned brewery.

== Description ==
Assembly Brewing was a Black-owned brewery and restaurant with two locations in Portland, Oregon. The original restaurant was in southeast Portland's Mt. Scott-Arleta neighborhood, near Foster-Powell. An outpost called Pizza Annex operated on Alberta Street in northeast Portland's Concordia neighborhood.

The original restaurant operated in a renovated 7,500 square-foot space owned by Adam Dixon, which was previously housed a Korean grocery store. The Oregonian's Andre Meunier said, "The exterior sports clean, mid-century lines with a gray and earthy-orange theme. Inside, high ceilings with revealed wooden beams and earth tones create a rustic Portland pub feel, and artisans have crafted metal and wood pieces for the bars and tables." There were four interior murals, one of which was completed by Theo Holdt and inspired by Diego Rivera's Detroit Industry Murals, depicting brewers instead of automotive industry workers. Andy Giegerich of the Portland Business Journal described the artworks as "stunningly detailed". Assembly also had pinball, a covered patio, and a parking lot. Guests were required to be 21 years of age or older.

=== Menu ===
The menu included Detroit-style pizza, sandwiches, salads, cocktails, and seven beers on tap. Pizza varieties included Hawaiian, "meat-lovers" (with pork roll), and "veggie gourmet".

== History ==
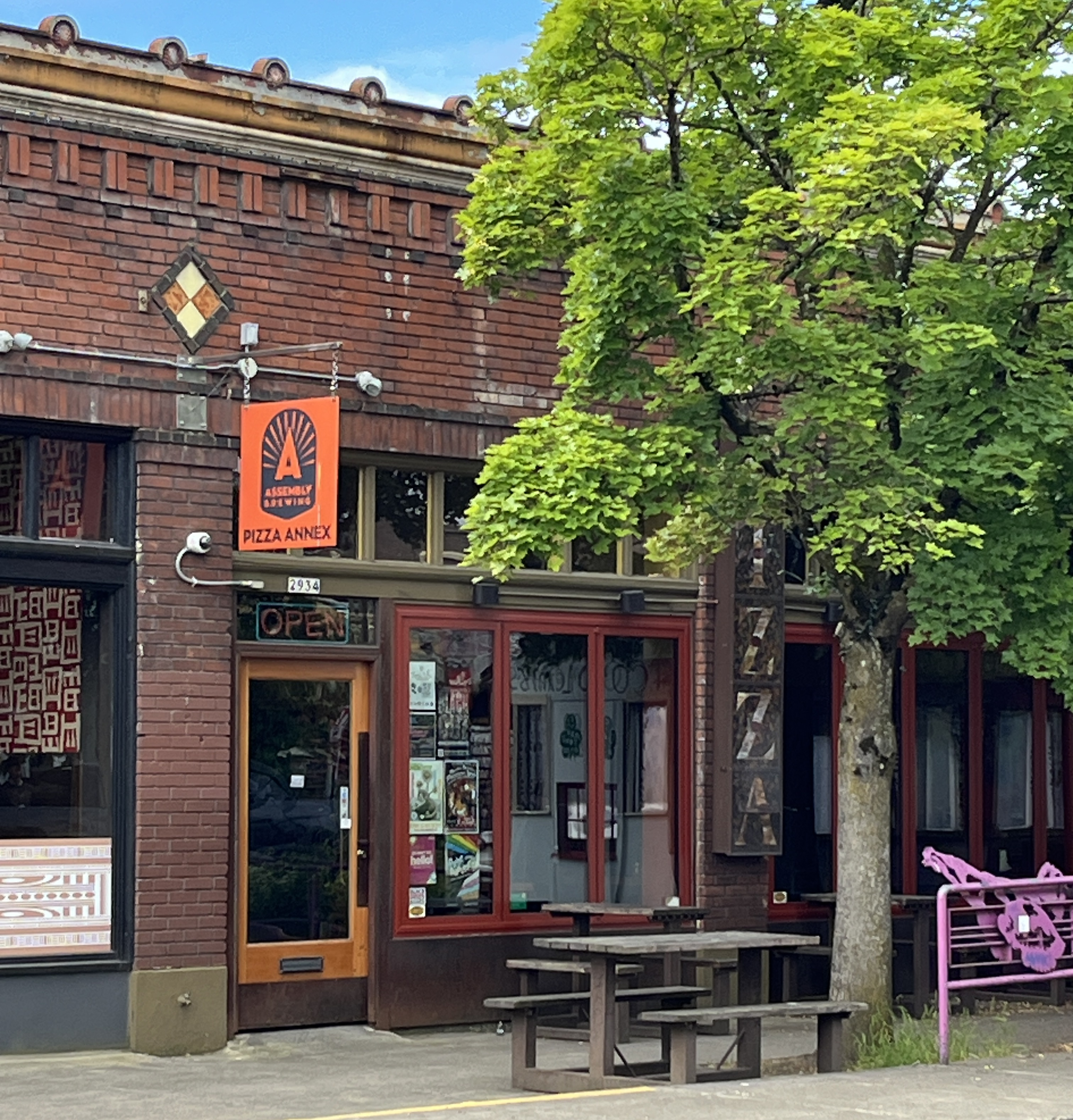
Exterior of the Pizza Annex, 2025

Co-founder and brewer George Johnson, originally from Detroit, established the business with Adam Dixon on March 23, 2019. Assembly was the first Black-owned brewery in Oregon, according to Portland Monthly's Katherine Chew Hamilton. In 2019, Andi Prewitt of Willamette Week said the business was "one of the few minority-owned breweries in the country".

During Pizza Week in 2021, the restaurant served a pizza called "The D" with pepperoni, Canadian bacon, mushrooms, onions, and green pepper.

In May 2025, the business announced plans to close the original location permanently on May 11. The Pizza Annex closed permanently in September 2025.

Following its closure, its property had turned into a massive transient encampment of community concerns. Some of the occupants include those who were ejected from the nearby Transition Projects, Inc. shelter.

The restaurant Cliff's, which previously operated in the basement of the Wonder Ballroom, is slated to begin operating in the space that housed the Pizza Annex in 2026.

== Reception ==
Willamette Week's Andi Prewitt said Assembly serves "what might be the most authentic Detroit-style pizza in town". Rachel Pinsky included the restaurant in Eater Portland's 2021 overview of "Where to Find Thick, Cheesy Square Pizzas in Portland".

== See also ==
- List of Black-owned restaurants
- List of defunct restaurants of the United States
- Pizza in Portland, Oregon
