= Queen of Sheba (restaurant) =

Ethiopian restaurant in Portland, Oregon, U.S.

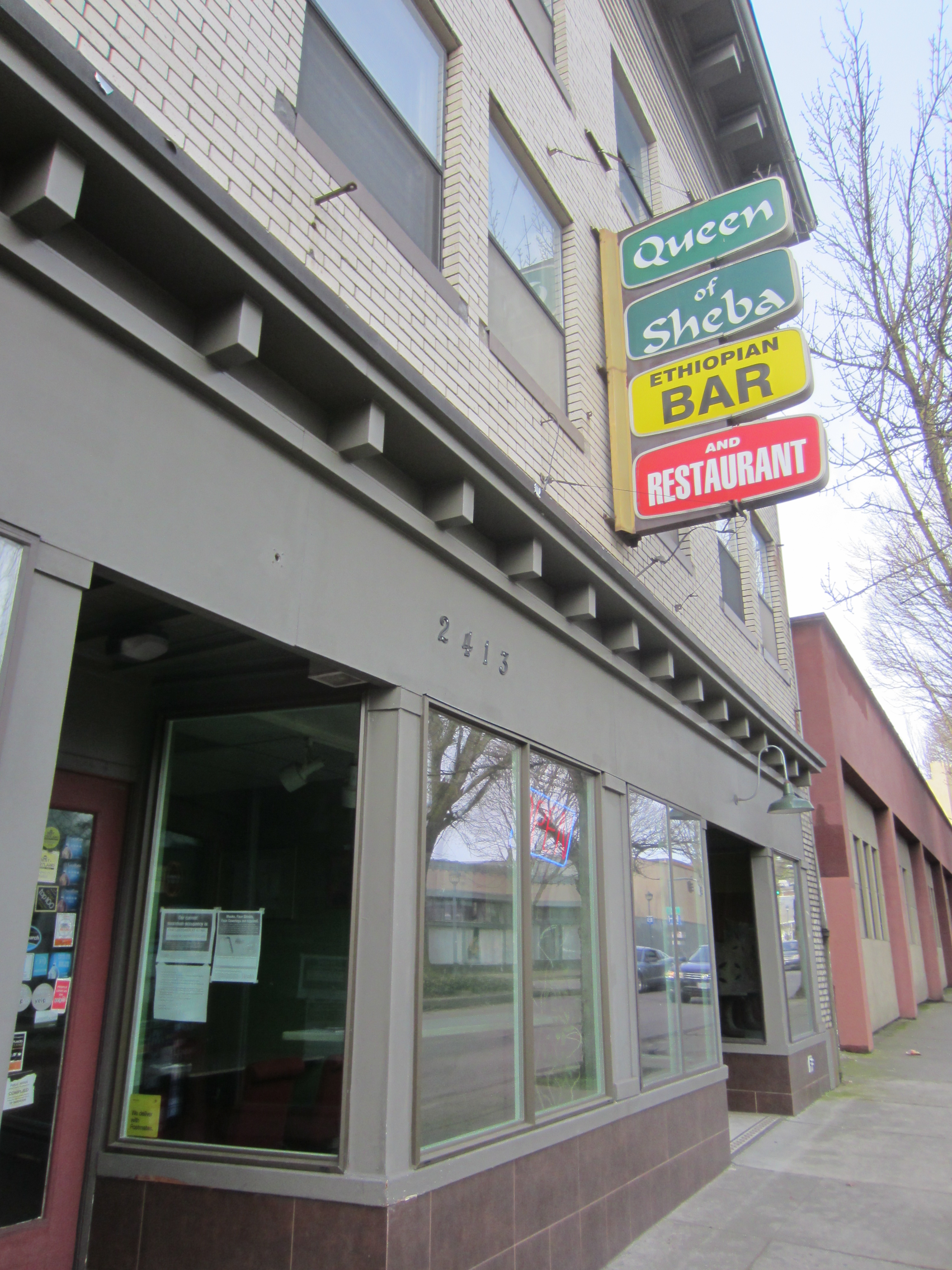
- The restaurant's front exterior, 2021
- Interactive map of Queen of Sheba

Restaurant information
- Owner: Alem Gebrehiwot
- Food type: Ethiopian
- Location: 2413 Northeast Martin Luther King Jr. Boulevard, Portland, Multnomah, Oregon, 97208, United States
- Coordinates: 45.5402°N 122.6618°W
- Website: queenofsheba.biz

Queen of Sheba (also known as Queen of Sheba Int'l Foods) is an Ethiopian restaurant in Portland, Oregon.

== History ==
The Black-owned restaurant opened during the 1990s. Alem Gebrehiwot was the owner, as of 2020.

== Reception ==
Queen of Sheba won in the Best Ethiopian Restaurant category of Willamette Week's annual 'Best of Portland' readers' poll in 2016, 2017, 2020, 2022, 2024, and 2025. In an overview of the city's "exceptional" Ethiopian food, Eater Portland's Maya MacEvoy wrote:

The casual-but-lively Queen of Sheba introduced many unfamiliar Portlanders to Ethiopian food when it opened in the ‘90s, quickly snagging local accolades and distributing injera, berbere, and other Ethiopian imports at markets around town. The folks at Queen of Sheba don’t play, spice-wise; all dishes arrive at a solid medium-hot. Those who can’t handle the heat should order mild dishes like an aromatic alicha. Conversely, heat-seekers can expect a real kick by ordering dishes like tibbsi kinttishara, sauteed mushrooms in a spicy berbere sauce.

== See also ==
- List of African restaurants
- List of Black-owned restaurants
