= Bintü Atelier =

African restaurant in Charleston, South Carolina, U.S.

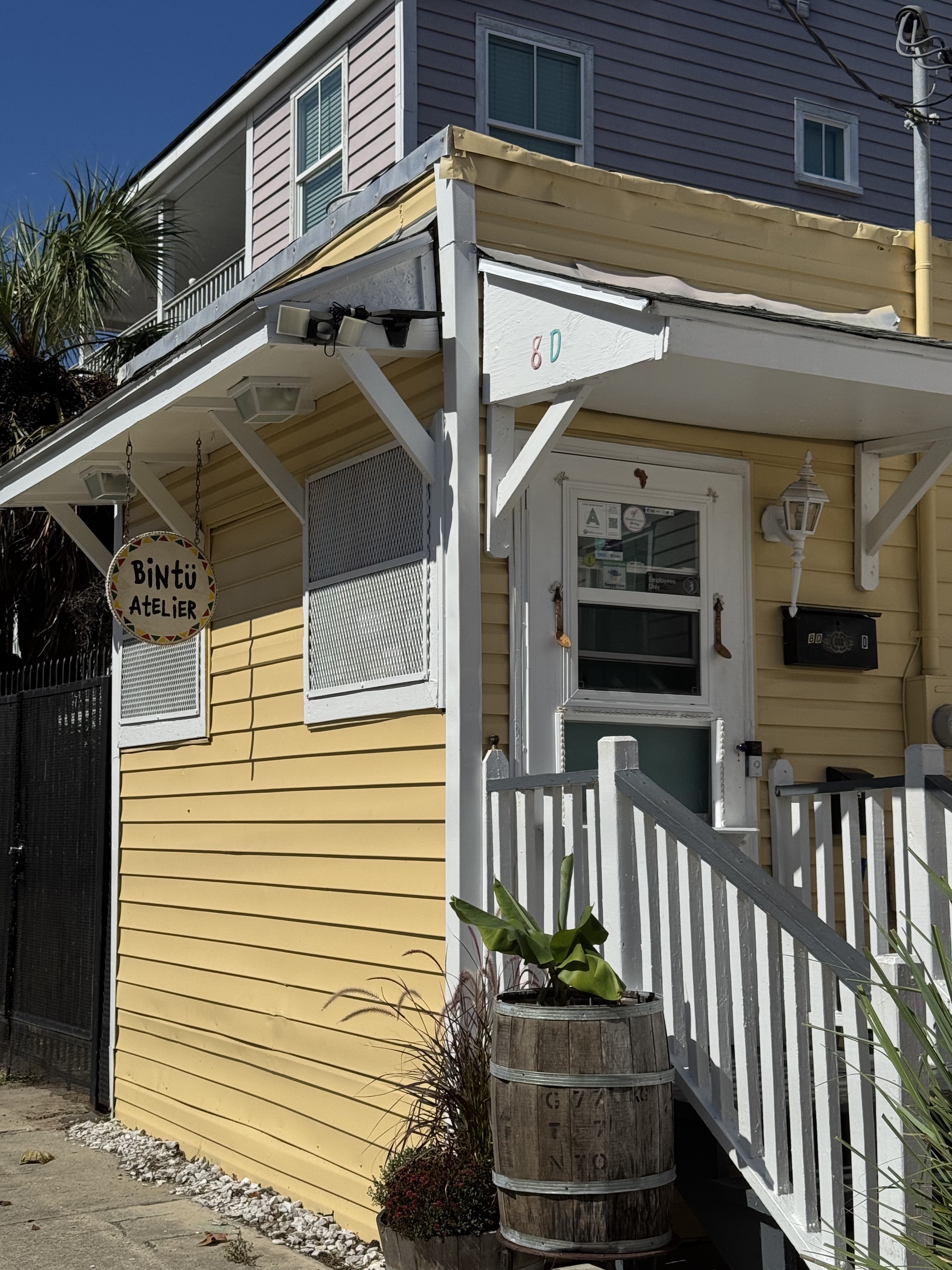
- Interactive map of Bintü Atelier

Restaurant information
- Owner: Bintou N'Daw Young
- Food type: African
- Location: 8D Line Street, Charleston, South Carolina, 29403, United States
- Coordinates: 32°47′50″N 79°56′18″W
- Website: www.bintuatelier.com

Bintü Atelier is an African restaurant in Charleston, South Carolina, United States. It was named one of the twenty best new restaurants of 2024 by Bon Appétit. The restaurant opened in June 2023 by Bintou N'Daw Young, who is also the head chef.

== See also ==
- List of African restaurants
