= Akoko (restaurant) =

West African restaurant in London, United Kingdom

- Interactive map of Akoko

Restaurant information
- Established: October 8, 2020
- Owner: Aji Akokomi
- Head chef: Mutaro Baldé
- Food type: West African; Nigerian
- Rating: (Michelin Guide)
- Location: Westminster, London, United Kingdom
- Coordinates: 51.5177°N 0.1368°W

Akoko is a Michelin-starred West African restaurant in London. The name of the restaurant means time and season, and the first in Yoruba.

== History ==
The restaurant's kitchen was initially headed by former MasterChef: The Professionals semi-finalist William Chilila, who departed as head chef in February 2021. He was replaced by Ayo Adeyemi.

Both Adeyemi and Akokomi's families are Yoruba and originally hailed from Nigeria, and Adeyemi cited the cuisines and ingredients of Nigeria, Ghana, Senegal and The Gambia influencing his cooking.

Adeyemi departed as the restaurant's head chef in September 2024, being replaced by Mutaro Baldé.

== Reception ==
Akoko was awarded a Michelin Star for its first time in 2024 under chef Adeyemi, and retained its Michelin star in 2025 under new chef Baldé.

== See also ==
- List of African restaurants
- List of Michelin starred restaurants in Greater London
