= Osteria la Spiga =

Italian restaurant in Seattle, Washington, U.S.

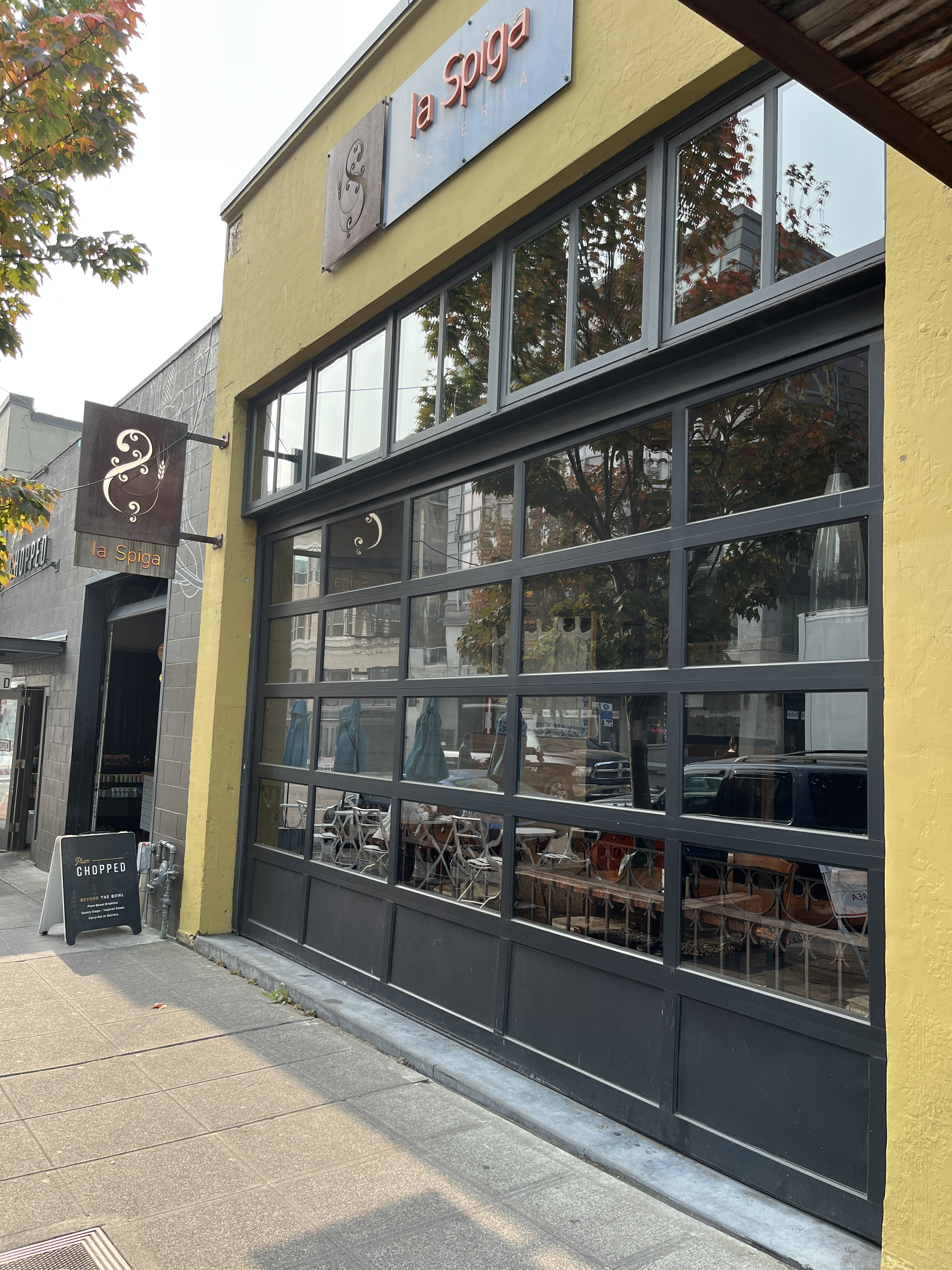
- The restaurant's exterior, 2022
- Interactive map of Osteria la Spiga

Restaurant information
- Established: 1998
- Owner: Sabrina Tinsley
- Chef: Sabrina Tinsley; Pietro Borghesi
- Food type: Italian
- Location: 1429 12th Avenue, Seattle, King, Washington, 98122, United States
- Coordinates: 47.6138°N 122.3172°W
- Website: laspiga.com

Osteria la Spiga is a Black-owned Italian restaurant on Seattle's Capitol Hill, in the U.S. state of Washington. Sabrina Tinsley is the chef and a co-owner with Pietro Borghesi. Established in 1998, the business specializes in foods from Northern Italy, specifically Bologna and Parma. The menu has included antipasti, pastas, soups, salads, and a tiramisu based on a family recipe. Osteria la Spiga has garnered a positive reception and has been deemed among Seattle's best Italian restaurants and Capitol Hill's best eateries. Tinsley opened nearby La Dispensa in 2022.

== Description ==
Osteria la Spiga is an Italian restaurant on Capitol Hill. The business claims to serve Emilia-Romagna cuisine, specializing in foods from Bologna and Parma. The menu has included antipasti, pastas, soups, and salads. The restaurant has also served piadina, tagliatelle in a white truffle butter sauce, gnocchi al pomodoro, tiramisu, and a chèvre with sautéed grapes using Toma cheese. Happy hour has included Italian cheese, roasted nuts, olives, and a pâté. The tiramisu is based on a family recipe.

== History ==
The business was established in 1998. Sabrina Tinsley is a co-owner and chef, along with Pietro Borghesi.

In 2021, Osteria la Spiga launched a pop-up series highlighting local BIPOC chefs. For Seattle Restaurant Week, the business offered a three-course dinner with a selection of appetizer, entree, and dessert options.

=== La Dispensa ===
Tinsley opened the Italian delicatessen and gastronomy shop La Dispensa in Chophouse Row in November 2022. The business has been described as a "sister restaurant" to Osteria la Spiga, which is located nearby.

== Reception ==
The 2010 edition of Best Places Northwest calls Osteria la Spiga a "fine option". Allecia Vermillion included the restaurant in Seattle Metropolitan's 2021 list of the best restaurant on Capitol Hill. She also included Osteria la Spiga in a 2022 overview of the city's best Italian food. The Seattle Times called Osteria la Spiga an "interesting lunch [option] around the Pike/Pine corridor" in 2022. Eater Seattle included the business in a 2022 overview of the city's best pasta eateries. In a 2023 list of 21 "essential" restaurants on Capitol Hill, the website's Jade Yamazaki Stewart and Sophie Grossman said the tiramisu "is one of the best in the city, with a simultaneously rich and light velvety texture".

== See also ==
- List of Black-owned restaurants
- List of Italian restaurants
