= Los Angeles Standard Newspaper =

African-American newspaper in Los Angeles, California, United States

The Los Angeles Standard Newspaper is an African-American owned print and online publication distributed in black communities of South Los Angeles and Inglewood. This free publication was launched in 2016 by owner/publisher Jason Douglas Lewis.

Before launching the Standard, Lewis worked at Our Weekly (2006-2008, 2013–2016) and the Los Angeles Sentinel Newspaper (2008-2013), which are also African-American owned newspapers. He worked as a writer, photographer, sports editor, and web and social media manager at both publications.

The Standard is known for original, community-based stories. The majority of the articles portray Black communities in a positive light, and Lewis wanted to focus on stories that larger publications overlook. It does not feature very many national or mainstream stories, but rather stories that are based specifically in South Los Angeles and Inglewood. It is particularly known for its photography work. All of the pages in the print version are in color, and photos are typically run fairly large. It has a free camera club that meets every third Tuesday of the month in View Park. Sections include News, Business, Politics, Education, Career, Entertainment, Sports, Art, Performing Arts, Health, Fitness, Food, Tech, Auto, Lifestyle, Travel, Society, Community, Home & Garden, and Camera Club. The newspaper has active Facebook and Instagram pages.

Publisher Jason Lewis was featured in VoyageLA. He is also quoted in a Los Angeles Times article, and Plug in South LA featured an article from the newspaper. NAMI Urban Los Angeles was interviewed by the Los Angeles Standard Newspaper
