= Boon Boona Coffee =

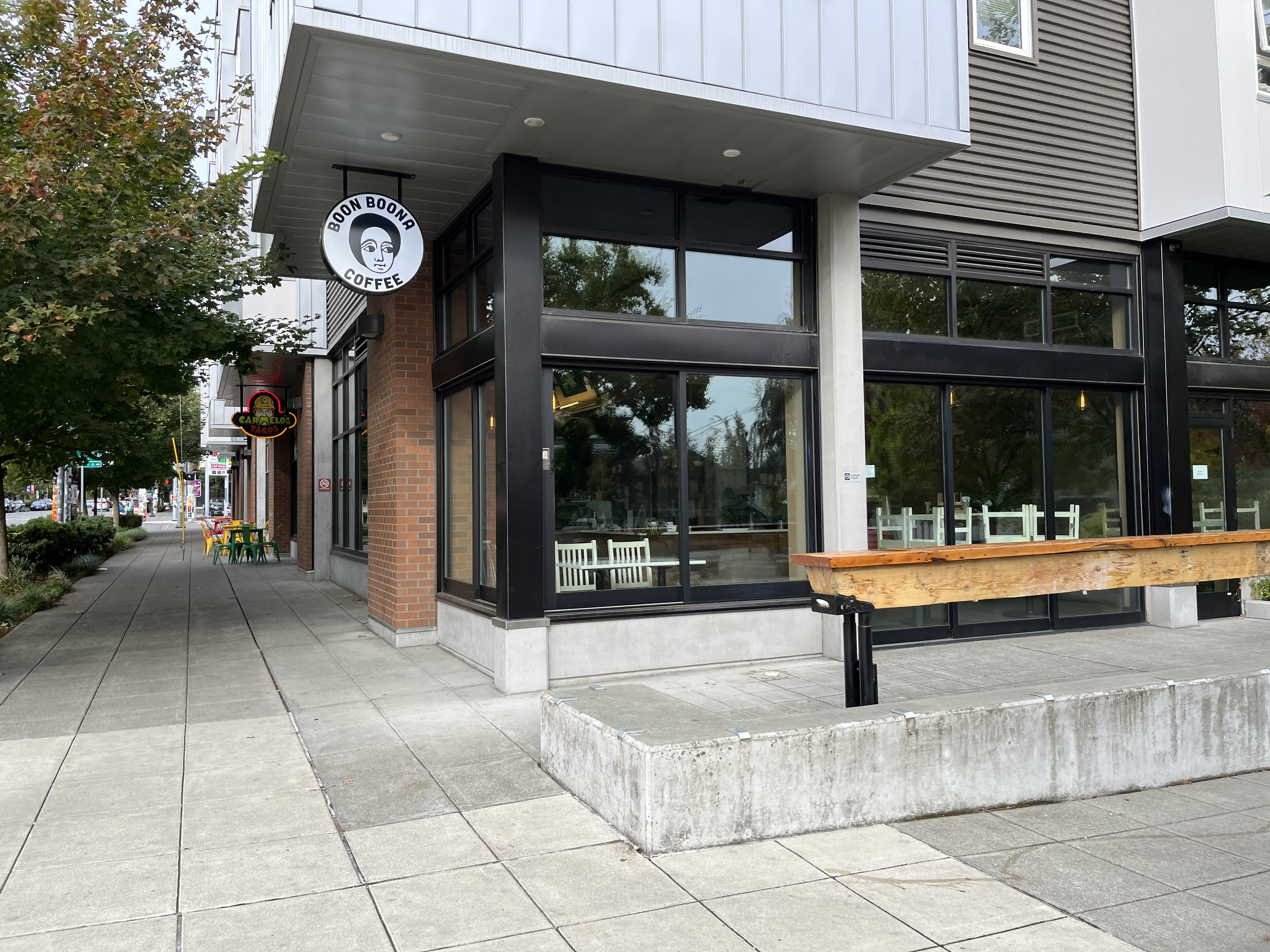
- Exterior of the Seattle location, 2022

Restaurant information
- Location: Washington, United States
- Website: boonboonacoffee.com

Boon Boona Coffee is a Black-owned coffee roaster and coffeehouse with two locations in the U.S. state of Washington.

== History ==
The business was founded by owner Efrem Fesaha in 2012. According to Eater Seattle, "As Fesaha developed the roastery, he established partnerships with farms in Ethiopia, Rwanda, Burundi, Kenya, and other African countries, and focused on supporting woman-owned growers." He opened a cafe in Renton in 2018 or 2019, followed by another in Seattle in 2021.

== Reception ==
In 2021, Aimee Rizzo of The Infatuation wrote, "Boon Boona sources their coffee beans exclusively from Africa and roasts them in-house—the result is a rich, bold cup that you should gulp regularly. While their espresso is terrific as is, they’ll often have a berbere-kicked mocha available. It’s earthy, a little spicy, and the perfect thing to sip all morning as you walk around Capitol Hill."

== See also ==
- List of Black-owned restaurants
