= Ezell's Chicken =

Fast food restaurant in Seattle, Washington, U.S.

Ezell's Famous Chicken
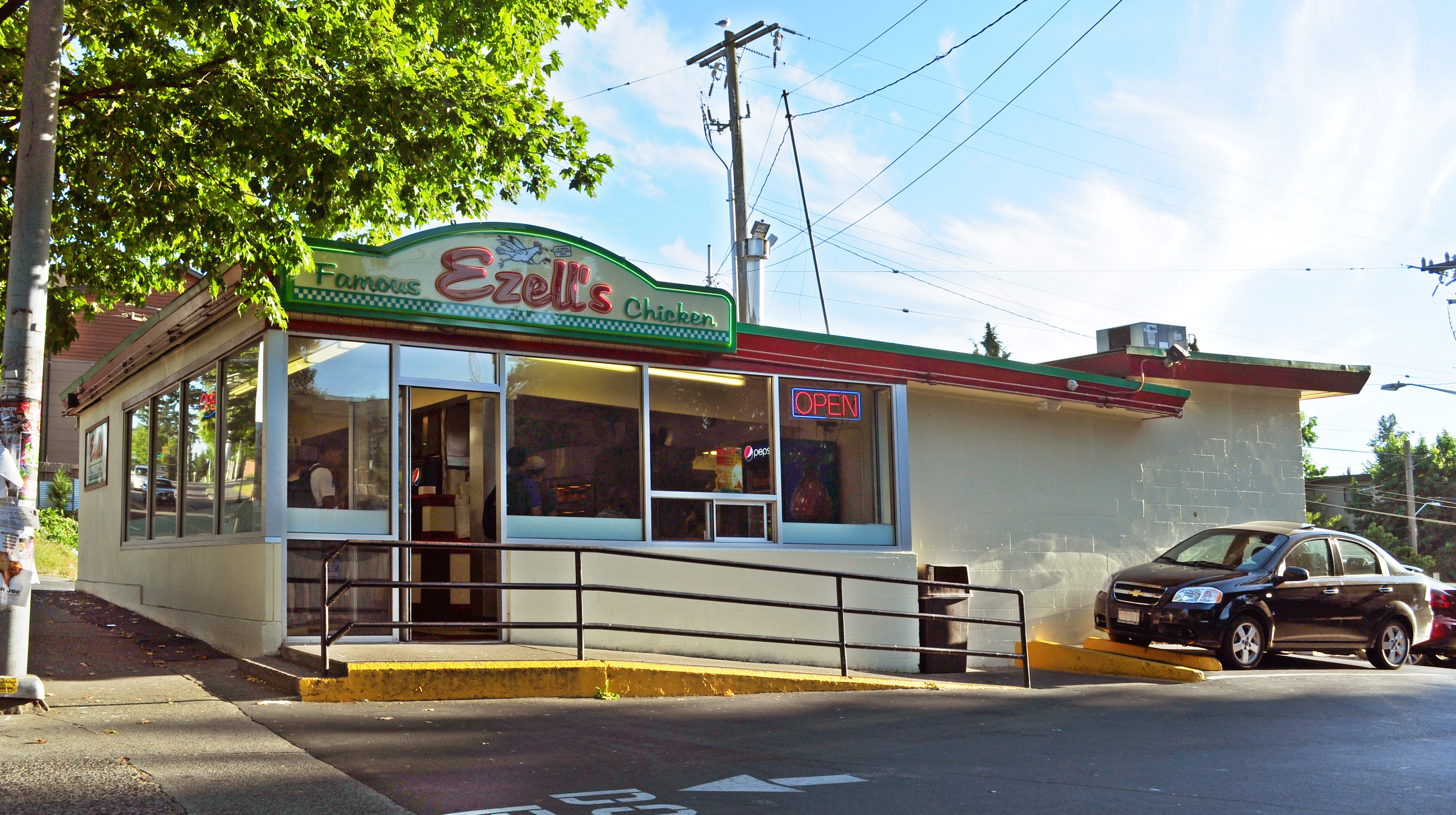
- The original Ezell's on 23rd Avenue in Seattle's Central District.
- Interactive map of Ezell's Famous Chicken

Restaurant information
- Established: February 3, 1984
- Previous owners: Ezell Stephens and Lewis Rudd
- Location: 501 23rd Avenue, Seattle, King County, Washington, 98122, United States
- Coordinates: 47°36′23″N 122°18′11″W
- Other locations: Yes
- Website: ezellschicken.com

Ezell's Famous Chicken is a Seattle fast food restaurant. The first restaurant was opened on February 3, 1984, in Seattle's Central District neighborhood, near Garfield High School. The restaurant chain has 12 other locations in the Puget Sound region, including a location on the Microsoft campus in Redmond that opened in 2006. In 2015, the chain opened its Spokane location, its first restaurant outside of Western Washington. The first international location for Ezell's opened in June 2015, in Sharjah, United Arab Emirates. The Sharjah location has since closed.

Ezell's was made famous when talk show host Oprah Winfrey called it her favorite fried chicken. It is also said she has the chicken flown to her in Chicago when she has a craving.

== History ==
The restaurant was founded by Ezell Stephens and Lewis Rudd, opening its first location on February 3, 1984, in the Central District. The pair, from Scottsville, Texas, discussed opening a restaurant in 1978 after Ezell left the Coast Guard and Lewis left the Army. Stephens and Rudd attended night school and later earned a loan from the Small Business Administration to open their store. A second location was opened in the University District in 1988, but closed in 1994 after financial problems. A second round of expansion began in 1998.

In 2021, Ezell's launched a "R.U.B.B. (Raising Up Black Businesses) Initiative", offering 20 inaugural grants of $2,500 each to Black-owned businesses or organizations in Washington state. The Initiative expanded to include a leadership conference the following year.

== Departure of Ezell Stephens ==
Following a contentious lawsuit Ezell Stephens left the company he started with his business partners Lewis and Faye. Ezell opened three restaurants in Everett, Lake City, and Renton, Washington. In November 2011, Ezell Stephens changed the name of his three locations to Heaven Sent Fried Chicken, because in the lawsuit he lost the rights to the name, but got to keep his recipe. In February 2019, the Renton location of Heaven Sent closed. The Lake City and Everett locations also were closed in early 2025 due to economic factors.

== See also ==
- List of fast-food chicken restaurants
