= Conrad Uno =

American record producer

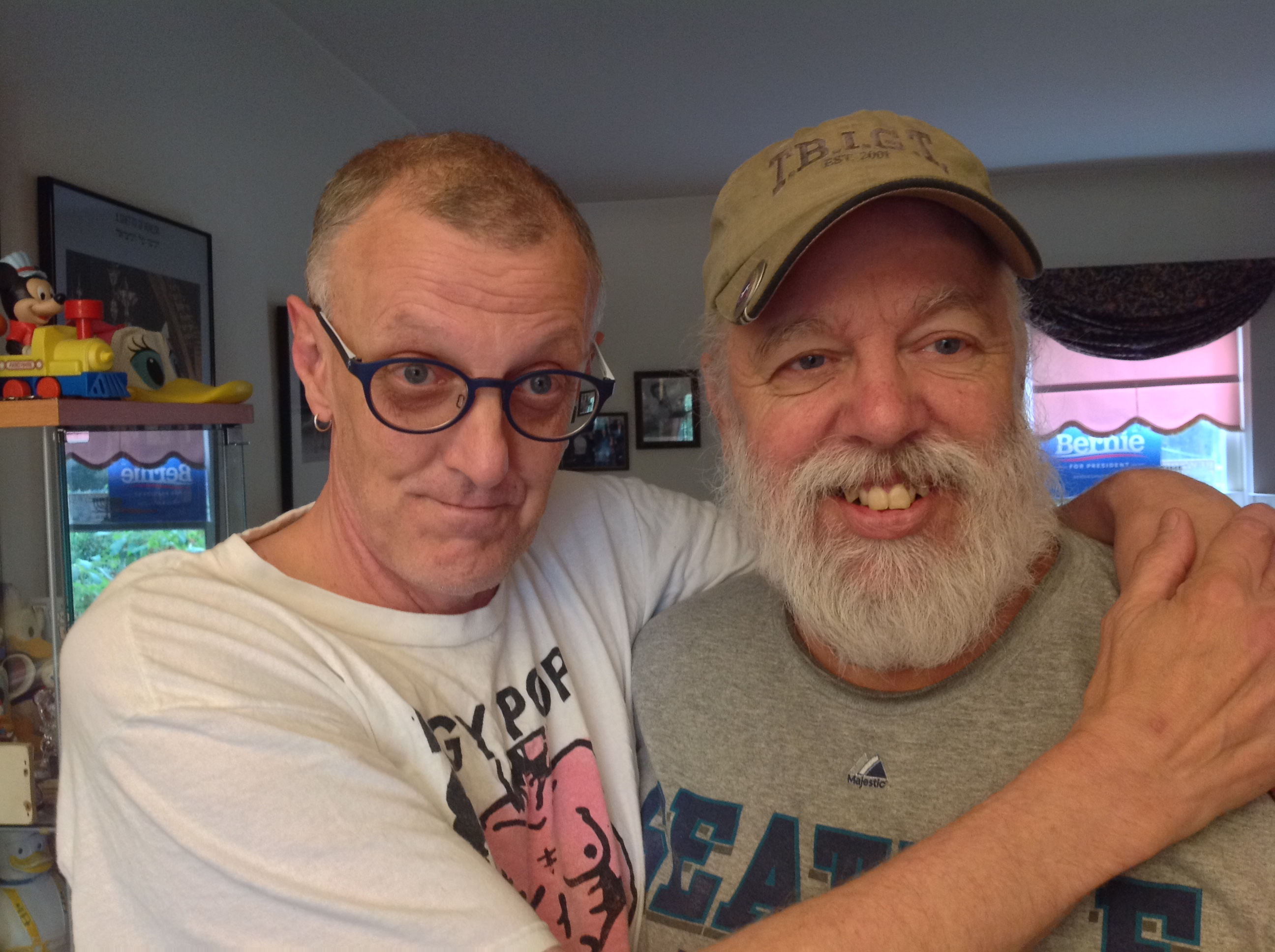
- Uno (right) with Rob Morgan of Popllama band The Squirrels, 2017

Background information
- Origin: Seattle, Washington, U.S.
- Occupations: Record producer, audio engineer, audio mixer, musician
- Years active: 1984–present
- Labels: PopLlama, Columbia, Sub Pop, Frontier, Estrus
- Website: eggstudios.net

Conrad Uno is an American record producer and founder of the independent record label PopLlama Records. Uno began his career making his own music as a teenager in his makeshift basement studio. At the request of his friends, the Young Fresh Fellows, Uno produced their debut album The Fabulous Sounds of the Pacific Northwest. When the band decided to release their debut album themselves, Uno founded PopLlama Records to help with the release. He would also produce their next four albums; Topsy Turvey (1985), The Men Who Loved Music (1987), Totally Lost (1988) and This One's for the Ladies (1989), the latter three released through Frontier Records. He would also produce albums by Dharma Bums, Haywire: Out Through the Indoor (1989), and Scott McCaughey, My Chartreuse Opinion (1989), while he was the engineer on Mudhoney's self-titled album released in 1989.

In the 1990s, Uno would produce albums for Mudhoney, their Sub Pop releases Every Good Boy Deserves Fudge (1991), Piece of Cake (1992) and their 1994 collaboration with Jimmie Dale Gilmore Buckskin Stallion Blues, and The Presidents of the United States of America, their 1994 debut self-titled album. Piece of Cake peaked at number 189 on the Billboard 200 while The Presidents' debut album would be re-released on Columbia Records the following year, peaking at number 6 on the Billboard 200 and later being certified double-platinum by the Recording Industry Association of America.

== Credits ==
Release	Title	Label	Artist/Group	Credits
1984	The Fabulous Sounds of the Pacific Northwest	PopLlama	Young Fresh Fellows	producer
1985	Topsy Turvey	PopLlama	Young Fresh Fellows	producer
1987	The Men Who Loved Music	Frontier	Young Fresh Fellows	producer
1988	Totally Lost	Frontier	Young Fresh Fellows	producer
1989	Haywire: Out Through the Indoor	PopLlama	Dharma Bums	producer
1989	Mudhoney	Sub Pop	Mudhoney	engineer
1989	My Chartreuse Opinion	Hollywood	Scott McCaughey	producer, vocals, engineer
1989	This One's for the Ladies	Frontier	Young Fresh Fellows	producer, background vocals, engineer
1990	Post No Bills	PopLlama	Capping Day	producer, engineer
1990	Very, Very Powerful Motor	PopLlama	Fastbacks	engineer
1990	What Gives?	PopLlama	The Squirrels	producer, background vocals, engineer, mixing
1990	"Stop Draggin Me Down"	PopLlama	The Mono Men	engineer
1991	Heidi	PopLlama	Jimmy Silva	producer, vocals
1991	One Way Rocket to Kicksville	Stumpy Joe		producer, vocals
1991	Every Good Boy Deserves Fudge	Sub Pop	Mudhoney	producer, engineer, mixing
1991	Don't Wanna Live	Sub Pop	The Derelicts	producer
1992	Break-A-Bone	Estrus	Gravel	engineer
1992	The Fall-Outs	Super-Electro Sound	The Fall-Outs	producer, engineer
1992	Paper Doll	PopLlama	The Picketts	producer, engineer
1992	Ritual Dimension of Sound	Estrus	The Mortals	engineer
1992	Wrecker!	Estrus	Mono Men	engineer
1992	Three Color Sun	Miramar	Symon-Asher	producer
1992	Dayglo	Sub Pop	Love Battery	engineer, mixing
1992	Between the Eyes	Sub Pop	Love Battery	producer
1992	The Question Is No	Sub Pop	Fastbacks	engineer
1992	Dirty	DGC	Sonic Youth	engineer, mixing
1992	It's Low Beat Time	Mordam	Young Fresh Fellows	producer
1992	Piece of Cake	Reprise	Mudhoney	producer, engineer, vocals
1993	Bent Pages	Estrus	Mono Men	engineer
1993	Music Minus Five	Norton	The A-Bones	engineer
1993	Tabara	Music of the World	Amadu Bansang Jobarteh	engineer
1993	Zücker	Sub Pop	Fastbacks	engineer
1993	Pottymouth	Kill Rock Stars	Bratmobile	engineer
1993	Outta Sight	Empty	Sinister Six	engineer
1993	No Stone Unturned	Estrus	Gravel	engineer
1993	Five Dollar Bob's Mock Cooter Stew	Reprise	Mudhoney	engineer
1994	Don't Fall Asleep...Horrible Things Will Happen	Bolt Remover	The Frampton Brothers	producer, engineer
1994	The Frampton Brothers Hate You	Bolt Remover	The Frampton Brothers	producer, engineer, mixing
1994	Harsh Toke of Reality	PopLlama	The Squirrels	producer, engineer, mixing
1994	The Presidents of the United States of America	PopLlama	The Presidents of the United States of America	producer
1994	La Mano Cornuda	Sub Pop	Supersuckers	producer, engineer
1994	Sin and Tonic	Estrus	Mono Men	engineer
1994	Sleep in a Wigwam	Optional Art	Rich Arithmetic	engineer
1994	Wet Pants Club	Radiation	The Smugglers	producer
1994	Buckskin Stallion Blues	Sub Pop	Mudhoney and Jimmie Dale Gilmore	producer
1994	Fear of Women	Empty	The Putters	producer, engineer
1994	You Can Feel the Love in This Room	Empty	Sicko	producer, engineer
1994	Powerstrip	Sympathy for the Record Industry	The Nomads	producer, engineer, mixing, background vocals
1994	World Contact Day	Lookout!	Groovie Ghoulies	producer
1994	Saucers over Vegas	Estrus	The Galaxy Trio	engineer
1995	Call Down the Moon	Griffin	Man	engineer
1995	I Got Time	Frontier	The Shame Idols	producer
1995	Near the End of the Harvest	PopLlama	Jimmy Silva	producer, engineer, mixing
1995	Old Liquidator	Hollywood	The Minus 5	engineer, executive producer
1995	The Wicked Picketts	Rounder	The Picketts	producer, engineer
1995	In the Hall of Fame	PopLlama	The Smugglers	producer
1995	Red Dress	PopLlama	Red Dress	producer, engineer, mastering, background vocals
1995	Temptation on a Saturday	PopLlama	Young Fresh Fellows	engineer
1995	The Inhalants	Estrus	The Inhalants	engineer
1996	Shady Lane	Scooch Pooch	The La Donnas	producer, engineer, mixing, organ
1996	When Day Has Broken	Tim/Kerr	Pilots	mixing
1996	World Contact Day	Lookout!	Groovie Ghoulies	producer
1996	Flat Tracker	Scooch Pooch	Zeke	producer, engineer, mixing
1996	Masonic Youth	Empty	Scared of Chaka	engineer
1997	Dance with Evil	Scooch Pooch	Rock Boss	producer
1997	April March Sings Along With The Makers	Sympathy for the Record Industry	April March	engineer
1997	Flipp	Hollywood	Flipp	producer, engineer
1997	The Lonesome Death of Buck McCoy	Hollywood	The Minus 5	engineer
1997	Running with Bigfoot	Lookout!	Groovie Ghoulies	engineer
1997	Punk Rock and Roll	Rip Off	The Statics	engineer, mixing
1998	Success	PopLlama	The Posies	producer, engineer, mixing
1998	Pure Frosting	Columbia	The Presidents of the United States of America	producer, engineer, mixing
1998	Rocket Cat	Frontier	The Shame Idols	producer, engineer, mixing
1999	Recording	Super-Electro Sound	Wiretaps	engineer, mixing
2000	Blueprint for the Blues	Self-published	Orville Johnson	engineer
2000	Not-So-Bright Side of the Moon	PopLlama	The Squirrels	engineer, mixing
2000	Just the Way We Like It	Junk	Weaklings	engineer, mixing
2000	Revolutions Per Minute	Orange Music	Jason Trachtenburg	producer
2001	The Wanna-Bes	Lookout!	The Wanna-Bes	producer, engineer
2001	Strategically Interrupted Silence	Beltane Dancers Music	The Drews	engineer, mixing, backing vocals
2002	On Earth as It Is in Heaven	Global Seepej	The Plains	mixing
2002	The Return	New School	800 Octane	producer
2002	Sweat-Soaked and Satisfied	Infect	Cookie	producer
2002	Palm Wine Sunday Blue	Hidden Agenda	Eric Lichter	producer
2002	Polaroid Angel	Ptarmigan	Jimm McIver	producer, engineer
2003	Bitches and Stitches	Go-Kart	Amazombie	engineer, mixing
2004	Honkahillarockabilly	Marlingspike Music	Knut Bell and the Blue Collars	producer, engineer
2004	Drunkard in the Think Tank	Career	Roy Loney	engineer
2004	Boner	Finger	DEK	producer
2004	Rise Again	New School	800 Octane	producer
2004	Truth, Corrosion and Sour Bisquits	Book	Fastbacks	engineer
2004	Love Everybody	PUSA Music	The Presidents of the United States of America	engineer, mixing, audio production
2005	I Liked You Better When You Were a Corpse	Empty	Snitches Get Stitches	engineer
2005	Laugh in the Dark	Bomp!	The Invisible Eyes	engineer
2005	La Familia	Career	The Plaintiffs	producer
2005	21st Century Séance	Hidden Agenda	The Green Pajamas	producer
2006	Sudden Movements	Clickpop	Scatterbox	producer, engineer, mixing
2006	North of Bakersfield	Dionysus	Ruby Dee and the Snakehandlers	producer, engineer, percussion, vocals
2006	Dot to Dot	Street Anthem	Dreadful Children	engineer
2007	Not Just For Cops And Bondage	Self-published	ZipTye	engineer
2007	Upstairs/Downstairs	Dirtnap	The Ergs!	producer, engineer, mixing
2007	Push	Angry Chrome Entertainment	Kill Cupid	producer, engineer
2008	OK, I'm Dying	Kill Cupid Music	Kill Cupid	engineer
2008	On the Chewing Gum Ground	K	Wallpaper	producer, engineer
2008	Miles from Home	Dionysus	Ruby Dee and the Snakehandlers	producer, engineer
2008	Hindsight Is 20/20, My Friend	Dirtnap	The Ergs!	engineer
2008	Requiem	New School	800 Octane	engineer
2009	Chordata	Spark & Shine	Revolt Revolt	engineer, mixing
2011	Shiver	Underworld	Too Slim and the Taildraggers	producer, engineer, mixing
2014	NVM	Hardly Art	Tacocat	engineer
