= −5 =

−5 may refer to:

- The negative of the number 5
- The Minus 5, American band
  - The Minus 5 (album), album by the group of the same name
- Minus V, compilation album by Do As Infinity

== See also ==
- Under-five, a SAG-AFTRA contract term for an American television or film actor whose character has fewer than five lines of dialogue
