= I Think This Is =

Studio album by Young Fresh Fellows
- Released: July 7, 2009
- Recorded: November 20–24, 2008 in Seattle, Washington, United States
- Genre: Alternative rock
- Length: 32:39
- Language: English
- Label: Yep Roc
- Producer: Robyn Hitchcock

Young Fresh Fellows chronology
Because We Hate You (2001)	I Think This Is (2009)	Tiempo de Lujo (2012)

I Don't Think This Is
- The European edition of the album released by Munster, with a revised title and track listing and a booklet with 24 sketches made by Tad Hutchinson

I Think This Is is a studio album by Young Fresh Fellows, released on Yep Roc Records in 2009. It was released the same day as Scott McCaughey's other project The Minus 5's Killingsworth. The album was recorded at the behest of former Soft Boys member and friend Robyn Hitchcock, who offered to produce it. McCaughey had previously approached Hitchcock to produce an album 20 years prior, but the two couldn't arrange for an in-studio collaboration until they had toured together and several of the Fellows worked on his Jewels for Sophia.

== Reception ==
Mark Deming of Allmusic gave the album 3.5 out of five stars, calling it, "unusually focused and coherent-sounding" even as it transcends narrow genre definitions. PopMatters' Ron Hart awarded the album a 9 out of 10, agreeing that it is the most cohesive release from The Young Fresh Fellows and declared it their best album.

== Track listing ==
1. "The Guilty Ones" (Scott McCaughey) – 2:19
2. "Lamp Industries" (Kurt Bloch) – 2:02
3. "Suck Machine Crater" (McCaughey) – 2:55
4. "Let the Good Times Crawl" (Peter Buck, McCaughey) – 2:32
5. "Never Turning Back Again" (McCaughey) – 2:21
6. "New Day I Hate" (Bloch) – 2:01
7. "Go Blue Angels Go" (McCaughey) – 1:36
8. "Used to Think All Things Would Happen" (Chris Ballew, Tad Hutchinson) – 3:05
9. "YOUR Mexican Restaurant" (McCaughey) – 2:23
10. "Shake Your Magazines" (Ballew, Hutchinson) – 3:00
11. "After Suicide" (McCaughey) – 1:48
12. "If You Believe in Cleveland" (McCaughey) – 3:55
13. "Ballad of the Bootleg" (McCaughey) – 2:42

I Don't Think This Is track listing

1. "Suck Machine Crater" (McCaughey) – 2:55
2. "Let the Good Times Crawl" (Buck, McCaughey) – 2:32
3. "Never Turning Back Again" (McCaughey) – 2:21
4. "New Day I Hate" (Bloch) – 2:01
5. "Go Blue Angels Go" (McCaughey) – 1:36
6. "Gotta Get Away" (Mick Jagger, Keith Richards) – 1:42
7. "The Guilty Ones" (McCaughey) – 2:19
8. "The Final Tractor" (McCaughey) – 1:57
9. "After Suicide" (McCaughey) – 1:48
10. "Lay You in the Ground" (McCaughey) – 1:52
11. "If You Believe in Cleveland" (McCaughey) – 3:55
12. "Lamp Industries" (Kurt Bloch) – 2:02
13. "Shake Your Magazines" (Ballew, Hutchison) – 3:00

== Personnel ==
The Young Fresh Fellows

- Chris Ballew – composition, bass guitar, instrumentation
- Kurt Bloch – composition, guitar, engineering
- Tad Hutchison – composition, drums, instrumentation, vocals
- Scott McCaughey – composition, guitar, instrumentation, vocals
- Jim Sangster – bass guitar

Additional personnel

- Peter Buck – composition, 12-string guitar
- Robyn Hitchcock – guitar, production, vocals
