= In Rock =

In Rock may refer to:

- In Rock (The Minus 5 album)
- Deep Purple in Rock, an album by Deep Purple

== See also ==
- Les Inrockuptibles, frequently shortened to "Les Inrock"
