= My Chartreuse Opinion =

Studio album by The Minus 5
- Released: 1989
- Recorded: 1989
- Studio: Egg Studios, Seattle, Washington (part of "A Sobering Thought" recorded upstairs at Eric's)
- Genre: Pop rock
- Length: 33:35
- Language: English
- Label: East Side Digital and PopLlama (original); Hollywood (re-release)
- Producer: Scott McCaughey; Conrad Uno

The Minus 5 chronology
The Lonesome Death of Buck McCoy (1997)	My Chartreuse Opinion (1989)	In Rock (2000)

My Chartreuse Opinion is a 1989 solo album by Scott McCaughey, later reissued as an album by The Minus 5 on Hollywood Records on August 26, 1997.

== Critical reception ==
Professional ratings
Review scores
Source	Rating
Allmusic	3/5 stars

The editorial staff of AllMusic Guide gave the album three out of five stars, with reviewer Tim DiGravina calling it "an endearing album that could get by on charm alone" and a "joyful, minor album of songs that are just a step away from being gems".

== Track listing ==
All songs written by McCaughey, unless otherwise noted:

1. "Losing Battle" – 3:04
2. "Happy for the Box" – 2:03
3. "The Big Dead End" – 2:08
4. "A Sobering Thought" – 3:28
5. "Real True Tragedy Incident" – 2:55
6. "You'll Never See My Face Again" (Barry Gibb, Maurice Gibb, and Robin Gibb) – 4:21
7. "I Might Have Listened" – 1:56
8. "Evolution" – 2:45
9. "Shut Them Out" – 2:26
10. "Big Deal" – 2:45
11. "The Real Prime Directive" – 3:02
12. "People Say" (Jeff Barry and Ellie Greenwich) – 2:42

East Side Digital and Hollywood Records bonus tracks

13. "Sittin' Round Doin' Nothin'" (Tad Hutchison and McCaughey) – 2:44
14. "Roller Coaster Blues" – 2:52

Jimmy Silva Hits from the East Side Digital release

15. "Fair Exchange" (Jimmy Silva) – 2:47
16. "Waking Up" (Silva) – 3:23
17. "Party Town U.S.A." (Silva) – 3:01
18. "Lathe" (Silva) – 7:00

== Personnel ==
- Jim Babjack – lead guitar on "Real True Tragedy Incident"
- Chuck Carroll – lead guitar on "Shut Them Out"
- Jed Critter – musical saw on "A Sobering Thought", slide guitar on "You'll Never See My Face Again"
- Dennis Diken – drums
- Eric Erickson – slide mini guitar on "A Sobering Thought"
- Riki Mafune – backing vocals on "People Say"
- Scott McCaughey – vocals, guitar, bass guitar, organ, piano, vibes, mandolin on "The Real Prime Directive", production
- Christy McWilson – harmony vocals on "Happy for the Box", backing vocals on "People Say"
- Brent Pennington – slide guitar on "Shut Them Out", lead guitar on "The Real Prime Directive"
- Blackie Rad – percussion on "A Sobering Thought"
- Jim Sangster – lead guitar on "Losing Battle"
- Jimmy Silva – twelve-string guitar on "You'll Never See My Face Again"
- Conrad Uno – production

Re-release bonus tracks

- Ben Vaughn Combo on "Sittin' Round Doin' Nothin'" and "Roller Coaster Blues":

- Aldo Jones – piano, vocals
- Robbie Robinson – snare drum, vocals
- Conrad Uno – vocals
- Ben Vaughn – organ
- Mike Vogelman – bass guitar, vocals

- Scott McCaughey – vocals, guitar, production
