= True Crime =

True crime is a genre of non-fiction books, magazines, websites, films, TV shows, and podcasts.

True Crime may also refer to:

== Television ==
- True Crime (Sony Pictures Television), a British crime-based channel 2016–2019
- True Crime (AMC Networks), a British crime-based channel 2023–present
- True Crime Network, an American broadcast network
- True Crime with Aphrodite Jones, a 2010–2016 American documentary series
- 72 Hours: True Crime, a 2004–2007 Canadian documentary series
- Law & Order True Crime, a 2017 American series
- "True Crime" (Only Murders in the Building), a 2021 episode

== Other uses ==
- True Crime Community, online fandom for criminals
- True Crime (1996 film), starring Alicia Silverstone
- True Crime (1999 film), starring and directed by Clint Eastwood
- True Crime (album), a 1999 live album by Zeke
- "True Crime", a song by White Zombie from Let Sleeping Corpses Lie
- True Crime video game series:
  - True Crime: Streets of LA, a 2003 video game
  - True Crime: New York City, a 2005 video game and sequel to Streets of LA
  - Sleeping Dogs, a 2012 video game developed as True Crime: Hong Kong
- True Crime Zine, an online literary magazine about true crime books

== See also ==
- Crime (disambiguation)
