= Between the Eyes (disambiguation) =

Between the Eyes is an album by Love Battery, including its title song.

Between the Eyes may also refer to:

- Between the Eyes, a series of albums by Velvet Acid Christ
- "Between the Eyes", a song by Amon Düül II from Yeti (2001 reissue)
- "Between the Eyes", a song by The Angels from Two Minute Warning
- "Between the Eyes", a song by Cast, a B-side of the single "Flying"
- "Between the Eyes", a song by Ratt from Invasion of Your Privacy
