= Because We Hate You =

Studio album by Young Fresh Fellows
- Released: 2001
- Genre: Rock
- Length: 40:57
- Label: Mammoth

Young Fresh Fellows chronology
Temptation on a Saturday (1995)	Because We Hate You (2001)	I Think This Is (2009)

Because We Hate You is an album by American rock group the Young Fresh Fellows, one half of a split album with the Minus 5, released in 2001 on Mammoth Records.

== Critical reception ==
Professional ratings
Review scores
Source	Rating
Robert Christgau	(dud)
Entertainment Weekly	B−

CMJ New Music Monthly noted that the album "combines the beery grace of a great frat-rock band with a broad rock-historical palette".

== Track listing ==
All songs written by Scott McCaughey except as indicated.

1. "Barky's Spiritual Store"
2. "Lonely Spartanburg Flower Stall"
3. "I Wonder What She's Doing Tonite" (Boyce and Hart)
4. "For the Love of a Girl"
5. "Fuselage"
6. "My Drum Set"
7. "Worthless"
8. "She's a Book"
9. "Good Times Rock 'n' Roll" (McCaughey, Kurt Bloch, Todd Hutchison, Jim Sangster)
10. "Little Bell"
11. "Summerland"
12. "Mamie Dunn, Employee of The Month"
13. "Your Truth, Our Lies" (Croaker Norge, Batum Schrag)
14. "The Ballad of Only You and the Can Prevent Forest Fires"

== See also ==
- Let the War Against Music Begin
