= 5 =

Natural number

← 4	5	6 →
- −1 0 1 2 3 4 5 6 7 8 9 →: List of numbers; Integers; ← 0 10 20 30 40 50 60 70 80 90 →
- Cardinal: five
- Ordinal: 5th (fifth)
- Numeral system: quinary
- Factorization: prime
- Prime: 3rd
- Divisors: 1, 5
- Greek numeral: Ε´
- Roman numeral: V, v
- Greek prefix: penta-/pent-
- Latin prefix: quinque-/quinqu-/quint-
- Binary: 101_{2}
- Ternary: 12_{3}
- Senary: 5_{6}
- Octal: 5_{8}
- Duodecimal: 5_{12}
- Hexadecimal: 5_{16}
- Greek: ε (or Ε)
- Arabic, Kurdish: ٥
- Persian, Sindhi, Urdu: ۵
- Ge'ez: ፭
- Bengali: ৫
- Kannada: ೫
- Punjabi: ੫
- Chinese numeral: 五
- Armenian: Ե
- Devanāgarī: ५
- Hebrew: ה
- Khmer: ៥
- Telugu: ౫
- Malayalam: ൫
- Tamil: ௫
- Thai: ๕
- Babylonian numeral: 𒐙
- Egyptian hieroglyph, Chinese counting rod: |||||
- Maya numerals: 𝋥
- Morse code: .....
- ASCII value: ENQ
- Santali: ᱕

5 (five) is a number, numeral and digit. It is the natural number, and cardinal number, following 4 and preceding 6, and is a prime number.

Humans, and many other animals, have 5 digits on their limbs.

== Mathematics ==
The first Pythagorean triple

5 is a Fermat prime, a Mersenne prime exponent, as well as a Fibonacci number. 5 is the first congruent number, as well as the length of the hypotenuse of the smallest integer-sided right triangle, making part of the smallest Pythagorean triple (3, 4, 5).

5 is the first safe prime and the first good prime. 11 forms the first pair of sexy primes with 5. 5 is the second Fermat prime, of a total of five known Fermat primes. 5 is also the first of three known Wilson primes (5, 13, 563).

=== Geometry ===
A shape with five sides is called a pentagon. The equilateral pentagon is the first regular polygon that does not tile the plane with copies of itself. The pentagon solid has the largest face of any of the five regular three-dimensional regular Platonic solids.

A conic is determined using five points in the same way that two points are needed to determine a line. A pentagram, or five-pointed polygram, is a star polygon constructed by connecting some non-adjacent vertices of a regular pentagon as self-intersecting edges. The internal geometry of the pentagon and pentagram (represented by its Schläfli symbol {5/2}) appears prominently in Penrose tilings. Pentagrams are facets inside Kepler–Poinsot star polyhedra and Schläfli–Hess star polychora.

There are five regular Platonic solids the tetrahedron, the cube, the octahedron, the dodecahedron, and the icosahedron.

The plane contains a total of five Bravais lattices, or arrays of points defined by discrete translation operations. Uniform tilings of the plane, are generated from combinations of only five regular polygons.

Five-fold symmetry is associated with the golden ratio $\frac{1+\sqrt 5}{2}$. In a regular pentagram, intersections of diagonals divide one another in the golden ratio.

=== Higher dimensional geometry ===
A hypertetrahedron, or 5-cell, is the 4 dimensional analogue of the tetrahedron. It has five vertices. Its orthographic projection is homomorphic to the group K_{5.}

There are five fundamental mirror symmetry point group families in 4-dimensions. There are also 5 compact hyperbolic Coxeter groups, or 4-prisms, of rank 5, each generating uniform honeycombs in hyperbolic 4-space as permutations of rings of the Coxeter diagrams.

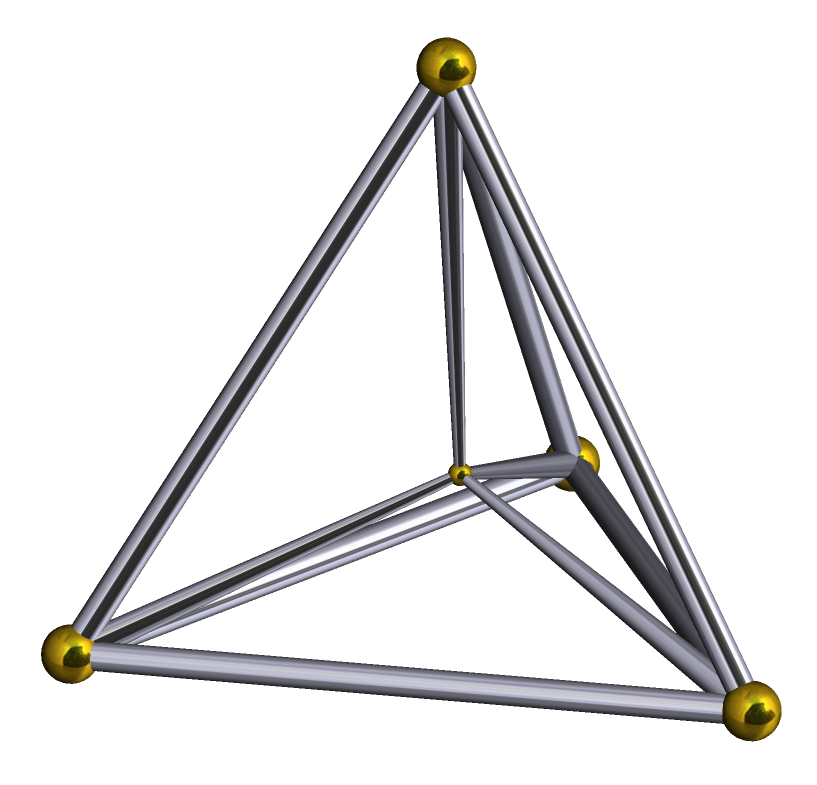
The four-dimensional 5-cell is the simplest regular polychoron.

=== Arithmetic ===
The smallest non-trivial magic square

5 is the value of the central cell of the first non-trivial normal magic square, called the Luoshu square. All integers $n \ge 34$ can be expressed as the sum of five non-zero squares. There are five countably infinite Ramsey classes of permutations. 5 is conjectured to be the only odd, untouchable number; if this is the case, then five will be the only odd prime number that is not the base of an aliquot tree.

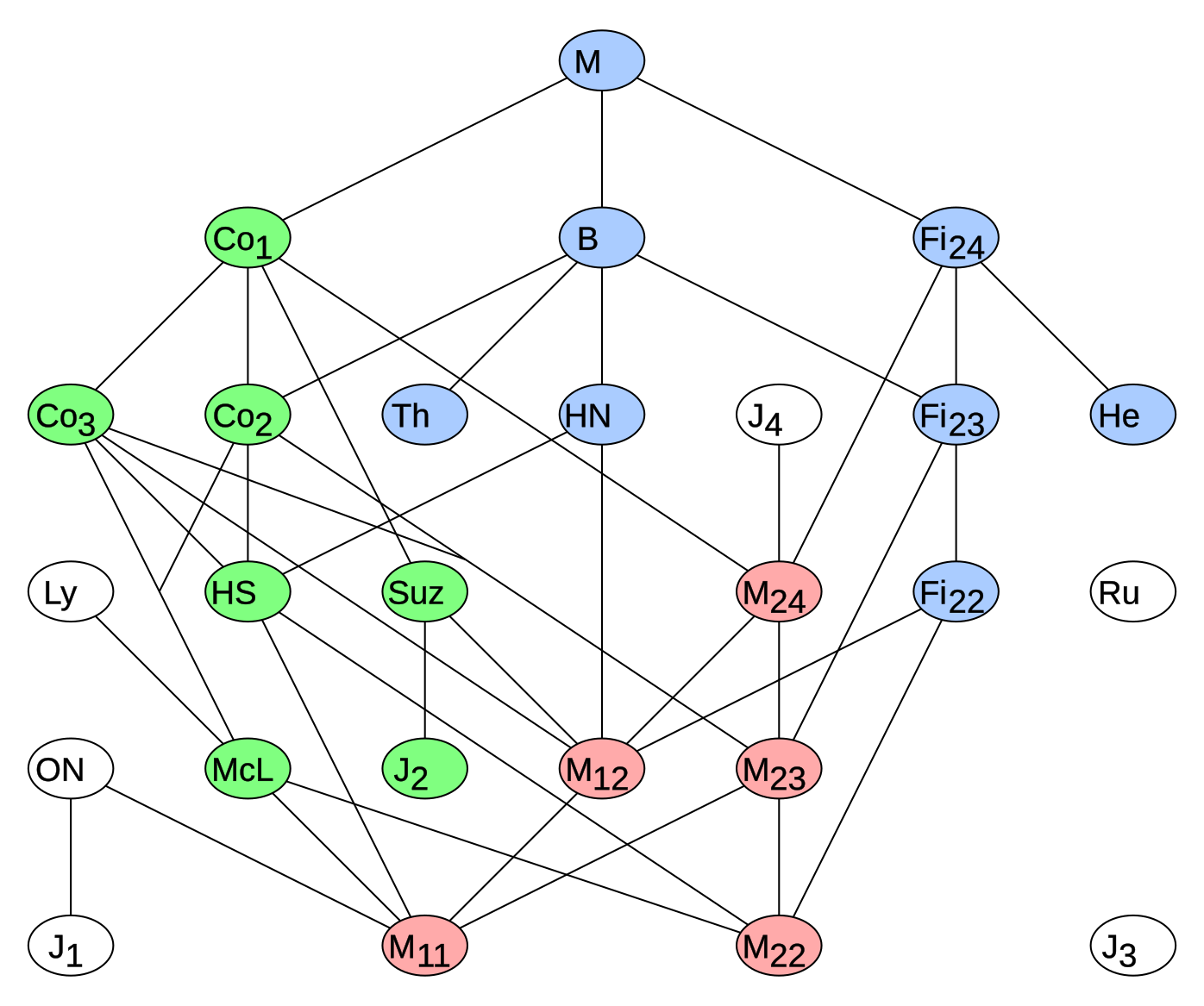
This diagram shows the subquotient relations of the twenty-six sporadic groups; the five Mathieu groups form the simplest class (colored red).

Every odd number greater than five is conjectured to be expressible as the sum of three prime numbers; Helfgott has provided a proof of this (also known as the odd Goldbach conjecture) that is already widely acknowledged by mathematicians as it still undergoes peer-review. On the other hand, every odd number greater than one is the sum of at most five prime numbers (as a lower limit).

Unsolved problem in mathematics
Is 5 the only odd, untouchable number?
More unsolved problems in mathematics

=== Group theory ===
In graph theory, all graphs with four or fewer vertices are planar, however, there is a graph with five vertices that is not: K_{5}, the complete graph with five vertices. By Kuratowski's theorem, a finite graph is planar if and only if it does not contain a subgraph that is a subdivision of K_{5}, or K_{3,3}, the utility graph.

There are five complex exceptional Lie algebras. The five Mathieu groups constitute the first generation in the happy family of sporadic groups. These are also the first five sporadic groups to have been described. A centralizer of an element of order 5 inside the largest sporadic group $\mathrm {F_1}$ arises from the product between Harada–Norton sporadic group $\mathrm{HN}$ and a group of order 5.

== List of basic calculations ==
Multiplication	1	2	3	4	5	6	7	8	9	10	11	12	13	14	15	16	17	18	19	20
5 × x	5	10	15	20	25	30	35	40	45	50	55	60	65	70	75	80	85	90	95	100

Division	1	2	3	4	5	6	7	8	9	10	11	12	13	14	15
5 ÷ x	5	2.5	1.6̅	1.25	1	0.83̅	0.7̅1̅4̅2̅8̅5̅	0.625	0.5̅	0.5	0.4̅5̅	0.416̅	0.3̅8̅4̅6̅1̅5̅	0.35̅7̅1̅4̅2̅8̅	0.3̅
x ÷ 5	0.2	0.4	0.6	0.8	1	1.2	1.4	1.6	1.8	2	2.2	2.4	2.6	2.8	3

Exponentiation	1	2	3	4	5	6	7	8	9	10	11	12	13	14	15
5^{x}	5	25	125	625	3125	15625	78125	390625	1953125	9765625	48828125	244140625	1220703125	6103515625	30517578125
x^{5}	1	32	243	1024	3125	7776	16807	32768	59049	100000	161051	248832	371293	537824	759375

== Evolution of the Arabic digit ==

The evolution of the modern Western digit for the numeral for five is traced back to the Indian system of numerals, where on some earlier versions, the numeral bore resemblance to variations of the number four, rather than "5" (as it is represented today). The Kushana and Gupta empires in what is now India had among themselves several forms that bear no resemblance to the modern digit. Later on, Arabic traditions transformed the digit in several ways, producing forms that were still similar to the numeral for four, with similarities to the numeral for three; yet, still unlike the modern five. It was from those digits that Europeans finally came up with the modern 5 (represented in writings by Dürer, for example).

While the shape of the character for the digit 5 has an ascender in most modern typefaces, in typefaces with text figures the glyph usually has a descender, as, for example, in.

On the seven-segment display of a calculator and digital clock, it is often represented by five segments at four successive turns from top to bottom, rotating counterclockwise first, then clockwise, and vice versa. It is one of three numbers, along with 4 and 6, where the number of segments matches the number. This makes it often indistinguishable from the letter S. Higher segment displays may sometimes may make use of a diagonal for one of the two.

== Other fields ==
In Basque, bost, "5", also means "a lot".

=== Religion ===
==== Judaism ====
Five is according to Maharal of Prague the number defined as the center point which unifies four extremes.

==== Islam ====
The Five Pillars of Islam. The five-pointed simple star ☆ is one of the five used in Islamic Girih tiles.

== See also ==
- 5 (disambiguation)
- −5 (disambiguation)
