= Let the War Against Music Begin =

Studio album by The Minus 5
- Released: 2001
- Genre: Rock music
- Length: 46:36
- Label: Mammoth

The Minus 5 chronology
In Rock (2000)	Let the War Against Music Begin (2001)	I Don't Know Who I Am (Let the War Against Music Begin Vol. 2) (2003)

Let the War Against Music Begin is an album by American rock group The Minus 5. It was released on Mammoth Records in 2001 as part of a split album with Because We Hate You by the Young Fresh Fellows.

== Recording and release ==
This album was paired with a Young Fresh Fellows release, Because We Hate You. The two Scott McCaughey-fronted groups toured together to promote the releases. Tracks from these sessions were released later in the year as I Don't Know Who I Am (Let the War Against Music Begin Vol. 2).

== Critical reception ==
Professional ratings
Review scores
Source	Rating
AllMusic	3/5 stars
PopMatters	

== Track listing ==
1. "Great News Around You"
2. "Got You"
3. "Ghost Tarts of Stockholm"
4. "The Rifleman"
5. "You Don't Mean It"
6. "A Thousand Years Away"
7. "The Amazing Dolphin Boy"
8. "Thirsty Bird"
9. "One Bar at a Time"
10. "John Barleycorn Must Live"
11. "Desperate for Someone"
12. "Your Day Will Come (Parts 1 & 2)"
