= At the Organ =

EP by The Minus 5
- Released: November 2, 2004
- Recorded: 2004
- Genre: Rock
- Length: 19:36
- Label: Yep Roc
- Producer: Mikael Jorgenson, Eric Lovre, Johnny Sangster

The Minus 5 chronology
In Rock (2004)	At the Organ (2004)	The Minus 5 (2006)

Professional ratings
Review scores
Source	Rating
Allmusic	3.5/5 stars
Classic Rock	4/5 stars
PopMatters	7/10 stars

At the Organ is an EP by American rock band The Minus 5. Released on Yep Roc in 2004, the album features a lineup of Peter Buck from R.E.M., Ken Stringfellow from the Posies, Rebecca Gates from the Spinanes, and Wilco.

== Track listing ==
1. "Lyrical Stance" (Peter Buck, Scott McCaughey, Jeff Tweedy) – 1:26
2. "Hotel Senator" (McCaughey) – 3:20
3. "Formerly Hail Centurion" (McCaughey, Tweedy) – 3:29
4. "Film of the Movie" (McCaughey) – 2:32
5. "The Town That Lost Its Groove Supply (Seattle Version)" (McCaughey) – 2:37
6. "Days of Wine and Booze (original)" (McCaughey) – 2:22
7. "One More Bottle to Go" (McCaughey, Tweedy) – 3:50
- "The Town That Lost Its Groove Supply" (video clip)

== Personnel ==
=== Musicians ===
- Scott McCaughey - electric and acoustic guitar, vocals, rocksichord, mixing
- Jeff Tweedy - guitars, synthesizer, vocals, drums
- John Stirratt - organ, percussion
- Glenn Kotche - drums, marimba, percussion
- Leroy Bach - electric guitar, marimba
- Peter Buck - bass, guitar
- Mikael Jorgensen - celeste, Farfisa organ, producer, engineer
- Rebecca Gates - vocals
- John Ramberg - bass, lead and backing vocals
- Bill Rieflin - drums
- Ken Stringfellow - horn
- John Moen - clapping, stomping
- Jimmy Talent - bass

=== Production ===
- Johnny Sangster, Eric Lovre - producers, engineers, mixing
- Charlie Francis - mixing
- Kurt Bloch - layout design, mixing, mastering
- Chris Mars - animation, artwork, video
- Scott Ferril - video
