= This One's for the Ladies =

This One's For the Ladies

Studio album by Young Fresh Fellows
- Released: 1989
- Genre: Alternative rock
- Label: Frontier Records
- Producer: Conrad Uno

Young Fresh Fellows chronology
Beans and Tolerance (1989)	This One's For the Ladies (1989)	Electric Bird Digest (1991)

Professional ratings
Review scores
Source	Rating
Allmusic	3/5 stars

This One's For the Ladies is the fifth proper full-length album by rock band Young Fresh Fellows. It was released in 1989 by Frontier Records, and represents the first appearance of lead guitarist Kurt Bloch (of famed Seattle rock group The Fastbacks) on a Fellows release. This record contains the band's sole chart hit, "Carrothead", which peaked at #29 on the Billboard Modern Rock Tracks chart in 1990.

== Track listing ==
1. "This One's For The Ladies"
2. "Still There's Hope"
3. "Carrothead"
4. "Middle Man Of Time"
5. "Wishing Ring"
6. "New Old Song"
7. "The Family Gun"
8. "Rotation"
9. "Taco Wagon"
10. "Picture Book"
11. "Lost Track Of Time"
12. "Miss Lonelyhearts"
13. "Deep, Down And In Between"
14. "When I'm Lonely Again/One Day You Die"
15. "Don't You Wonder How It Ends?"
