= Totally Lost =

Studio album by Young Fresh Fellows
- Released: 1988
- Genre: rock music
- Label: Frontier Records
- Producer: Conrad Uno

Young Fresh Fellows chronology
The Men Who Loved Music (1987)	Totally Lost (1988)	Beans and Tolerance (1989)

Professional ratings
Review scores
Source	Rating
Allmusic	3/5 stars

Totally Lost is the fourth album by rock band Young Fresh Fellows. It was released in 1988 through Frontier Records.

== Track listing ==
All songs written by Scott McCaughey, except where noted.

1. Everything's Gonna Turn Out Great
2. Failure (McCaughey, Jimmy Silva)
3. The Universal Trendsetter
4. Don't Look At My Face You Might See What I Mean
5. I'd Say That You Were Upset
6. No Help At All
7. No One Really Knows
8. Little Softy
9. I Blew My Stack
10. Take My Brain Away (McCaughey, Tad Hutchison)
11. Celebration
12. Picky Piggy
13. Totally Lost (Complete Version)
14. You're Not Supposed To Laugh
15. World Tour '88
