= Topsy Turvy (Young Fresh Fellows album) =

Studio album by Young Fresh Fellows
- Released: 1985
- Genre: rock music
- Length: 37:30
- Label: PopLlama
- Producer: Conrad Uno

Young Fresh Fellows chronology
The Fabulous Sounds of the Pacific Northwest (1984)	Topsy Turvy (1985)	The Men Who Loved Music (1987)

Professional ratings
Review scores
Source	Rating
Allmusic	4/5 stars

Topsy Turvy was the second album by rock band Young Fresh Fellows. It was released in 1985 on PopLlama. It was the band's first album to feature longtime member Jim Sangster on bass.

The album was given a positive review by Rolling Stone Magazine, in their July 17, 1986 issue. Reviewer David Fricke wrote that the album was “the perfect refresher, a bracing bop cocktail of daffy comic relief, canny pop songwriting, and punk-rock drive.” Band leader Scott McCaughey noted in 2020 that many of the album's songs remain in the band's setlists to the day.

The album was later re-released as a two-for-one double CD with their first album, The Fabulous Sounds of the Pacific Northwest.

In 2026, the band released a new album, Loft. The album cover was a deliberate throwback to this 1985 album.

== Track listing ==
Topsy

1. "Searchin' U.S.A." – 3:41
2. "How Much About Last Night Do You Remember?" – 1:57
3. "Where Is Groovy Town?" – 3:57
4. "The New John Agar" – 2:29
5. "Sharing Patrol Theme" – 3:50
6. "You've Got Your Head On Backwards" – 2:21

Turvy

7. "Two Lives" – 2:17
8. "Mr. Salamander's Review" – 2:34
9. "Trek to Stupidity" – 2:58
10. "Topsy Turvy Theme" – 2:52
11. "Hang Out Right" – 3:01
12. "Agar's Revenge" – 3:42
13. "Good Things Go" – 1:38
