= Flat Tracker =

Studio album by Zeke
- Released: 1996
- Genre: Hardcore punk, hard rock
- Length: 17:48
- Label: Scooch Pooch
- Producer: Conrad Uno

Zeke chronology
Flat Tracker (1996)	Kicked In the Teeth (1998)

Re-issue cover

Professional ratings
Review scores
Source	Rating
AllMusic	3/5 stars
Tucson Weekly	3/4 stars

Flat Tracker is the second studio album by the Seattle hardcore punk band Zeke. It was released on Scooch Pooch Records in 1996 and re-released on Relapse Records in 2008.

== Critical reception ==
Tucson Weekly wrote that "the heavy-duty scorch of Zeke is as dangerous and thrilling a spectacle as when Evel Knievel jumped his super-charged motorcycle over a dozen school buses at the Houston Astrodome back in the '70s." SF Weekly described the album as "packed with scorching 90-second odes to sex, drugs and fast cars/motorcycles."

AllMusic called it "a relentless ride of rock & roll abandon threaded through with punk rock speed and attitude ... perhaps Zeke's finest album."

== Track listing ==
1. "T-500"
2. "Eddie Hill"
3. "Chiva Knieval"
4. "Overkill"
5. "Mystery Train"
6. "Viva Agostini"
7. "Hate"
8. "Raped"
9. "Wanna Fuck"
10. "Fight in the Storeroom"
11. "Flat Track"
12. "Bitch"
13. "Daytona"
14. "Super Six"
15. "Eliminator"
