= Confusion Au Go Go =

Studio album by Love Battery
- Released: 1999
- Genre: Alternative rock, grunge, psychedelic rock
- Length: 52:51
- Label: C/Z

Love Battery chronology
Straight Freak Ticket (1995)	Confusion Au Go Go (1999)

Confusion Au Go Go is the final studio album by the rock band Love Battery. It was released in 1999 on C/Z Records.

== Critical reception ==
Professional ratings
Review scores
Source	Rating
AllMusic	4/5 stars
Martin C. Strong	7/10

AllMusic wrote: "The addition of Dan Peters (Mudhoney) on drums definitely tightens the screws, and the reinvigorated rhythm section provides the perfect foundation for guitarist Kevin Whitworth's inspired flights of fancy, including, as on Dayglo, some of the best slide guitar work in alternative rock." Martin C. Strong called Confusion Au Go Go "certainly a notable album," writing that "the band seemed to be in full swing and willing to push their boundaries."

== Track listing ==
1. "Confusion Au Go Go" – 3:40
2. "One Small Step" – 3:55
3. "Snipe Hunt" – 3:18
4. "Corporate Memo" – 3:26
5. "Colorblind" – 3:12
6. "Get on da Big Foot" – 0:30
7. "Dead Boys" – 4:10
8. "Hollow Body" – 4:41
9. "Cute One" – 2:45
10. "Punks Want Rights" – 4:45
11. "Transendental [sic] Fornication" – 4:52
12. "Guilty of Everything" – 5:09
13. "Monkey Brain" – 4:22
14. "Faithfull" – 4:06
