= Electric Bird Digest =

Studio album by Young Fresh Fellows
- Released: 1991
- Recorded: March 1991 at Smart Studios, Madison, Wisconsin
- Genre: rock music
- Label: Frontier Records

Young Fresh Fellows chronology
This One's For the Ladies (1989)	Electric Bird Digest (1991)	It's Low Beat Time (1992)

Professional ratings
Review scores
Source	Rating
Allmusic	4.5/5 stars

Electric Bird Digest is the sixth full-length album by rock band Young Fresh Fellows. It was the last Young Fresh Fellows album released by Frontier Records, and was originally issued in 1991. The original LP included a free single with the songs "Zip-A-Dee-Doo-Dah", "Skyscraper of Facts" and "The Teen Thing".

== Track listing ==
1. Telephone Tree
2. Sittin' on a Pitchfork
3. Looking Around
4. Hillbilly Drummer Girl
5. Whirlpool
6. Once in a While
7. Teen Thing
8. Thirsty
9. Fear Bitterness and Hatred
10. Hard to Mention
11. Tomorrow's Gone (And So Are You)
12. Evening
13. There's a Love
14. Swiftly But Gently
