= Old Liquidator =

Studio album by The Minus 5
- Released: 1995
- Recorded: 1993
- Studio: Egg Studios; Portland, Oregon
- Genre: Rock
- Length: 52:16
- Label: East Side Digital
- Producer: Conrad Uno

The Minus 5 chronology
Hello EP (1994)	Old Liquidator (1995)	The Emperor of the Bathroom (1995)

Old Liquidator is the debut full-length album by American rock band The Minus 5. It was released in 1995 by East Side Digital Records. Recording sessions for the album were recorded simultaneously with their Hello EP debut. The sessions that produced this album and the following EP were followed up with The Lonesome Death of Buck McCoy, released in 1997.

== Critical reception ==
Professional ratings
Review scores
Source	Rating
AllMusic	4/5 stars

In a brief review for Billboard, the album was given a positive reception for its catchiness and breadth of songwriting. The editorial staff of AllMusic Guide gave the release four out of five stars.

== Track listing ==
All songs written by Scott McCaughey, except where noted

1. "Winter Goes Away" – 4:06
2. "Worse" – 2:46
3. "All the Time" – 3:49
4. "Find a Finger" – 3:04
5. "Emperor of the Bathroom" – 3:22
6. "Vulture" – 3:39
7. "Algerian Hook" – 2:40
8. "Story" – 3:56
9. "How Many Bones" – 3:20
10. "Basing Street" (Nick Lowe) – 3:06
11. "No More Glory" – 5:20
12. "When It Comes My Way" – 3:45
13. "House of Four Doors (Theme)" – 0:57
14. "Brotherhood of Pain" – 2:40
15. "Heartache for Sale" – 3:05
16. "Drunkard's Lullaby" – 1:54
17. "House of Four Doors" – 0:48

== Hello EP track listing ==
All songs written by Scott McCaughey

1. "Loser So Supreme" – 3:16
2. "Only One Thing" – 2:54
3. "Brotherhood of Pain" – 2:41
4. "Drunkards Lullaby" – 1:54

== Emperor of the Bathroom ==
In 1995, East Side Digital Records released this EP featuring alternate takes from the Old Liquidator sessions.

All songs written by Scott McCaughey, except where noted

1. "Emperor of the Bathroom" (Video Mix) – 3:26
2. "Heartache for Sale" – 3:07
3. "Story" (Alternate Mix) – 4:13
4. "Vulture" (Take 2) (Alternate Version) – 3:56
5. "This Little Woody" (Steve Barri and P. F. Sloan) – 2:58

== Personnel ==
=== Hello EP personnel ===
The Minus 5

- Terry Adams
- Tom Ardolino
- Jon Auer
- Peter Buck
- Scott McCaughey (including production)
- Jim Sangster
- Ken Stringfellow

Technical personnel

- Conrad Uno – production

=== Old Liquidator personnel ===
The Minus 5

- Terry Adams – piano
- Tom Ardolino – piano
- Jon Auer – rhythm guitar, percussion, violin, backing vocals
- Peter Buck – 12-string guitar, bass guitar, bouzouki, dulcimer, bassoon, drums
- Amy Denio – saxophone
- Chris Eckman – cello, guitar
- Scott McCaughey – banjo, bass guitar, guitar, vocals, drums, harmonica, organ, percussion, piano, production
- Richard Peterson – French horn, piano, trombone, trumpet
- Jim Sangster – bass guitar
- Ken Stringfellow – bass guitar, bassoon, drums, guitar, harmonica, piano, vibraphone, vocals, associate production
- Carla Torgerson – cello

Technical personnel

- Kearney Barton – recording
- Art Chantry – artwork
- Mark Guenther – recording
- Pat Gray – recording
- Nadine McCaughey – illustrations
- Marty Perez – photography
- Michael Shuler – engineering
- Conrad Uno – recording, production

=== Emperor of the Bathroom personnel ===
The Minus 5

- Terry Adams – piano on "Vulture" (Take 2) (Alternate Version)
- Jon Auer – guitar on "Emperor of the Bathroom" (Video Mix)
- Peter Buck – 12-string guitar and bouzouki on "Emperor of the Bathroom" (Video Mix) and "Heartache for Sale", drums on "Story" (Alternate Mix)
- Scott McCaughey – guitar, vocals, bass guitar, and tambourine on "Emperor of the Bathroom" (Video Mix); vocals, guitar, organ, and tambourine on "Heartache for Sale"; guitar, bass guitar, vocals, and loops on "Story" (Alternate Mix); vocals and acoustic guitar on "Vulture" (Take 2) (Alternate Version); all instrumentation on "This Little Woody"; production on all tracks
- Ken Stringfellow – drums on "Emperor of the Bathroom" (Video Mix), guitar on "Heartache for Sale", drums on "Story" (Alternate Mix)

Technical personnel

- Kearney Barton – recording
- Mark Guenther – recording
- Pat Gray – recording
- Marty Perez – photography
- Conrad Uno – recording, production
