= Far Gone =

Studio album by Love Battery
- Released: June 1, 1993
- Genre: Grunge, psychedelic rock
- Length: 41:04
- Label: Sub Pop
- Producer: Michael Beinhorn

Love Battery chronology
| Dayglo (1992) | Far Gone (1993) | Straight Freak Ticket (1995) |

Professional ratings
Review scores
| Source | Rating |
|---|---|
| AllMusic | 2/5 stars |

Far Gone is the third studio album by Seattle grunge band Love Battery, released in 1993 through Sub Pop.

== Track listing ==
| No. | Title | Length |
|---|---|---|
| 1. | "Searching For Rose" | 3:12 |
| 2. | "Half Past You" | 3:04 |
| 3. | "Head of Ringo" | 3:53 |
| 4. | "In Through The Outside" | 5:04 |
| 5. | "Split In Two" | 3:15 |
| 6. | "Feet" | 2:50 |
| 7. | "Far Gone" | 3:05 |
| 8. | "Float" | 3:32 |
| 9. | "Nebraska" | 3:44 |
| 10. | "I Can't See Nobody" | 3:18 |
| 11. | "Instrumental" | 2:53 |
| 12. | "Rust Belt" | 3:07 |
| Total length: | | 41:04 |

== Personnel ==
- Ron Nine - vocals
- Kevin Whitworth - guitar
- Bruce Fairweather - bass
- Jason Finn - drums

Production

- Michael Beinhorn - producer, mixing
- Dan Gellert - engineer, mixing
- Greg Di Gesu - second engineer
- Jeff Mauriello - assistant engineer

Artwork

- Love Battery - primary artist
- Art Chantry - design
- Karen Moskowitz - photography
- Charles Peterson - tray photography
