= Kicked in the Teeth (album) =

Studio album by Zeke
- Released: 1998
- Recorded: 1996–1998 by Jack Endino
- Genre: Hardcore punk, hard rock
- Length: 20:55
- Label: Epitaph Records
- Producer: Jack Endino

Zeke chronology
Flat Tracker (1996)	Kicked in the Teeth (1998)	True Crime (1999)

Professional ratings
Review scores
Source	Rating
AllMusic	2/5 stars
Austin Chronicle	2.5/4 stars
Pitchfork	3.7/10

Kicked In the Teeth is a 1998 album by the American band Zeke, released via Epitaph Records.

== Critical reception ==
Pitchfork wrote that "the music just isn't strong enough to warrant or excuse the band's bothersome attitudes." The Columbus Dispatch called the album "17 furious songs played ... in fewer than 20 minutes ... The quartet is equally adept at pummeling the ears with slow and midtempo tunes." The Albuquerque Journal thought that "quick songs blow by like fists from a hated bully, while others chug along a la Black Sabbath."

== Track listing ==
1. "God of GSXR"
2. "Telepath Boy"
3. "Rodney"
4. "Twisted"
5. "Dogfight"
6. "Kicked in the Teeth"
7. "Fuck All Night"
8. "Revolution"
9. "Killer Inside"
10. "Lawson"
11. "Revolution Reprise"
12. "Goggle Boy"
13. "Zeke You"
14. "Porked"
15. "Aces High"
16. "Shout It Out Loud" (Kiss cover)
17. "Mert"
