= Dayglo (album) =

Studio album by Love Battery
- Released: 1992
- Genre: Psychedelic music
- Length: 40:50
- Label: Sub Pop
- Producers: Conrad Uno, Jon Auer

Love Battery chronology
Between The Eyes (1990)	Dayglo (1992)	Far Gone (1993)

Dayglo is the second studio album by the American band Love Battery. It was released in 1992 by Sub Pop.

The band supported the album with a North American tour that included shows with L7.

== Critical reception ==
Professional ratings
Review scores
Source	Rating
AllMusic	4.5/5 stars

The Chicago Tribune noted that, "unlike some of its upper-left-coast peers, Love Battery takes a more textured, psychedelic approach to modern rock." USA Today determined that the band "adds discernible melody, trance-inducing rhythms, guitar tremolo and trippy effects, plus lyrics shaded by a very distant influence, Georgia-based R.E.M."

The Seattle Times deemed the music "a dense, psychedelic-tinged sound that has more in common with the English 'dream pop' movement of My Bloody Valentine and Ride than the Seattle grunge sound of Mudhoney and Tad." The Columbus Dispatch called the album "the right mix of '60s garage psychedelia and Neil Young-style music-as-primal-scream-therapy."

== Track listing ==
All songs written by Love Battery.

1. "Out of Focus" – 5:23
2. "Foot" – 3:48
3. "Damaged" – 3:58
4. "See Your Mind" – 3:21
5. "Side (With You)" – 5:00
6. "Cool School (Trane of Thought)" – 4:27
7. "Sometimes" – 3:23
8. "Blonde" – 4:19
9. "Dayglo" – 3:42
10. "23 Modern Stories" – 3:29

== Personnel ==
- Ron Nine – Vocals, guitar
- Kevin Whitworth – Guitar
- Jason Finn – Drums
- Jim Tillman – Bass
