= It's Low Beat Time =

Studio album by Young Fresh Fellows
- Released: 1992
- Genre: Rock
- Label: Frontier
- Producers: Conrad Uno, Butch Vig

Young Fresh Fellows chronology
Electric Bird Digest (1991)	It's Low Beat Time (1992)	Temptation on a Saturday (1995)

It's Low Beat Time is an album by the Americanrock band Young Fresh Fellows. It was released by Frontier Records in 1992. The album was produced in part by Butch Vig.

== Critical reception ==
Professional ratings
Review scores
Source	Rating
AllMusic	3/5 stars

The Tampa Tribune wrote that "[Scott] McCaughey's brain gives his sharper songs resonating edges of meaning while avoiding lyrics that make much linear sense." The Seattle Times opined that "99 Girls" and "She Won't Budge" "rank with the greatest of classic Northwest rock."

== Track listing ==
1. Low Beat Jingle
2. Right Here
3. Snow White
4. Mr. Anthony's Last
5. Whatever You Are
6. Two Headed Flight
7. A Minor Bird
8. Faultless
9. The Crafty Clerk
10. Low Beat
11. Love Is a Beautiful Thing
12. She Sees Color
13. Monkey Say
14. 99 Girls
15. She Won't Budge
16. Green Green
