= Between the Eyes =

Studio album by Love Battery
- Released: 1989 (as single); 1990 (as EP); 1991 (as LP)
- Recorded: 1989–1991
- Genre: Grunge
- Length: 8:28 (as single); 25:06 (as EP); 33:59 (as LP)
- Label: Sub Pop
- Producers: Jack Endino, Steve Fisk, Conrad Uno, Jon Auer

Love Battery chronology
Between the Eyes (1990)	Dayglo (1992)

Between the Eyes is the debut album by Seattle-based rock band Love Battery. Sub Pop Records had initially released a single titled "Between the Eyes" in 1989. Tupelo Recordings then released Between the Eyes as an EP/mini-album in 1990 (with "Licensed by Sub Pop" printed on the artwork). Sub Pop then solely released the final version in 1991, which expanded the album with three additional tracks. Between the Eyes is the only Love Battery album to feature original bassist Tommy Simpson. His replacement, Jim Tillman, played on the aforementioned three additional tracks when the album was widely issued.

== Reception ==
Professional ratings
Review scores
Source	Rating
AllMusic	3/5 stars

The single landed at No. 36 on Paste's list of the "50 Best Grunge Songs"; Paste called the LP "a stripped-down, gut-churning collection of gritty guitars and vox." The Stranger wrote that the LP, and its follow-up Dayglo, "remain psychedelic twin towers" in the catalog of Sub Pop.

== Track listing ==
All songs written by Love Battery (except where noted).

1991 LP

1. "Between the Eyes" - 4:28
2. "Easter" - 4:10
3. "Highway of Souls" - 5:25
4. "Orange" - 3:01
5. "2 and 2" - 2:25
6. "Before I Crawl" - 2:37
7. "Ibiza Bar" (Pink Floyd) - 3:00
8. "67" - 2:45
9. "Wings" - 3:12
10. "Shellshock" - 3:18

1990 EP

1. "Between the Eyes" - 4:28
2. "Easter" - 4:10
3. "Highway of Souls" - 5:25
4. "Orange" - 3:01
5. "2 and 2" - 2:25
6. "Before I Crawl" - 2:37
7. "Ibiza Bar" (Pink Floyd) - 3:00 (not included on vinyl version)

1989 single

1. "Between the Eyes" - 4:28
2. "Easter" - 4:10

== Personnel ==
- Jason Finn – drums
- Ron Nine – vocals, guitar
- Kevin Whitworth – guitar
- Tommy "Bonehead" Simpson – bass (tracks 1–7)
- Jim Tillman – bass (tracks 8–10)
- Jack Endino – production (tracks 1–3), co-production (tracks 4–7)
- Steve Fisk – co-production (tracks 4–7)
- Conrad Uno – co-production (tracks 8–10)
- Jon Auer – co-production (tracks 8–10)
- Tracy Rudzitis – back photography
- Alice Wheeler – front photography
- Art Chantry – jacket design
