= Straight Freak Ticket =

Studio album by Love Battery
- Released: February 28, 1995
- Genre: Grunge, psychedelic rock, alternative rock
- Length: 49:01
- Label: Atlas
- Producer: Bruce Calder, Love Battery

Love Battery chronology
Far Gone (1993)	Straight Freak Ticket (1995)	Confusion Au Go Go (1999)

Straight Freak Ticket is an album by the American alternative rock band Love Battery. The band's first album for a major label, it was released in 1995 on Atlas Records. The first single was "Fuzz Factory".

The band supported the album with a North American tour that included shows with Bettie Serveert. Straight Freak Ticket was a commercial disappointment.

== Production ==
Primarily produced by Bruce Calder, the album was recorded in Seattle in the fall of 1994. Kevin Whitworth played slide guitar on some of the album's tracks.

== Critical reception ==
Professional ratings
Review scores
Source	Rating
AllMusic	3/5 stars
The Charlotte Observer	3.5/4 stars
The Tampa Tribune	3/4 stars
USA Today	3/4 stars

The Albuquerque Journal deemed Straight Freak Ticket "a good, solid, basic rock 'n' roll album." The Seattle Post-Intelligencer called it "a solid, well-produced album of guitar-based rock with catchy hooks and a strong dose of psychedelia." The Arizona Daily Star considered Straight Freak Ticket to be "an excellent album, boasting the spirit of out-of-control rock music focused with the precision of a big-budget recording."

The Santa Fe New Mexican concluded: "If Nirvana was The Beatles of the Seattle Invasion, then Love Battery is somewhere between Gerry & The Pacemakers and Petula Clark." USA Today labeled the album "a psychedelic tour de force and dramatic leap forward," writing that "the antigrunge guitar riff-o-rama of Ron Nine and Kevin Whitworth propels the Seattle quartet's most adventurous and listenable tunes to date."

== Track listing ==
1. Fuzz Factory
2. If It Wasn't Me
3. Harold's Pink Room
4. Brazil
5. Nehru Jacket
6. Perfect Light
7. Red Onion
8. Sunny Jim
9. Straight Freak Show
10. Angelhead
11. Waylaid
12. Drowning Sun
13. Silent Treatment

== Personnel ==
- Ron Nine – Vocals, guitar
- Kevin Whitworth – Guitar
- Jason Finn – Drums
- Bruce Fairweather – Bass
- Produced by Bruce Calder & Love Battery
