= Oar On, Penelope! =

Studio album by The Minus 5
- Released: May 30, 2025
- Studio: Crackle & Pop, Seattle, Washington; The Panther, Portland, Oregon; Dungeon of Horror, Portland, Oregon; Eight Palms Ranchero, Poway, California
- Genre: College rock
- Length: 37:26
- Label: Yep Roc
- Producer: Scott McCaughey

The Minus 5 chronology
Calling Cortez (2023)	Oar On, Penelope! (2025)

Singles from Oar On, Penelope!
- 1. "Words & Birds" Released: February 10, 2025

Oar On, Penelope! is the sixteenth studio album by American pop rock band The Minus 5. It was released on May 30, 2025, through Yep Roc Records, in CD, LP and digital formats.

== Background ==
Produced by Scott McCaughey and mixed by Ed Stasium, Oar On, Penelope!, was preceded by Calling Cortez in 2023 and was noted as a college rock album. It consists of twelve tracks ranging between one and three minutes each, with a total runtime of approximately thirty-seven minutes. The album's lead single, "Words & Birds", was released on February 10, 2025.

== Reception ==
Professional ratings
Review scores
Source	Rating
AllMusic	4/5 stars
Mojo	4/5 stars
Uncut	7/10 stars

The album was described by AllMusic as "the sort of spontaneously joyous record that reminds us it's a great thing he's still with us and making music."

Stephen Thomas Erlewine of Mojo remarked, "Ed Stasium, the veteran producer of the Ramones, gives these raw sessions a galvanizing roar: this is college rock meant to be blasted over the radio, a record as vigorous as it is joyous," and assigned the album a four-star rating.

Bud Scoppa of Uncut gave it a rating of seven out of ten and noted in his review, "Long-running side project adds another branch to its twisted family tree."

== Track listing ==
Oar On, Penelope! track listing
No.	Title	Length
1.	"Words & Birds"	3:12
2.	"Death the Bludgeoner"	3:04
3.	"Let the Rope Hold, Cassie Lee"	3:26
4.	"I Don't Want to Hate Anyone"	2:37
5.	"The Garden of Arden"	3:23
6.	"Last Hotel"	3:51
7.	"Bison Queen"	3:47
8.	"Falling Like Jets"	3:11
9.	"Burgundy Suit"	1:55
10.	"Blow in My Bag"	2:56
11.	"Sharktooth"	2:46
12.	"We Shall Not Be Released"	3:18
Total length:		37:26

== Personnel ==
Credits for Oar On, Penelope! adapted from Bandcamp.

- Linda Pitmon – drums
- Kurt Bloch – lead guitar, mastering
- Scott McCaughey – vocals, guitar, piano, bass, production, artwork, recording
- Debbi Peterson – vocals
- Peter Buck – bass, 12-string
- Spencer Tweedy – drums on "Bison Queen" and "Falling Like Jets"
- Patterson Hood – backing vocals on "Let the Rope Hold, Cassie Lee" and "Blow in My Bag"
- Ed Stasium – guitar, tambourine, mixing, recording, engineering
- Mary Winzig – artwork
- Kevn Kinney – artwork
- Nathan Golub – artwork
- Johnny Sangster – recording
- Steve Drizos – recording
