= Beans and Tolerance =

Studio album by Young Fresh Fellows
- Released: 1989
- Genre: Rock music

Young Fresh Fellows chronology
Totally Lost (1988)	Beans and Tolerance (1989)	This One's for the Ladies (1989)

Professional ratings
Review scores
Source	Rating
AllMusic	3/5 stars

Beans and Tolerance was a self-released LP by rock band Young Fresh Fellows. Commonly referred to as "The Bootleg" or "3 Young Fresh Fellows 3," it was recorded following the departure of founding member Chuck Carroll but prior to his replacement Kurt Bloch's joining. The band recorded as a trio with Jim Sangster playing lead guitar and Scott McCaughey on bass.

== Track listing ==
1. "Rock And Roll Guitars"
2. "Fruitbasket Blues"
3. "Vacation Rock"
4. "Nino Ferrar In Trouble"
5. "Stop Breathing You're Foggin' Up My Mind"
6. "Gorilla"
7. "Shake Your Love"
8. "Silhouette"
9. "I Want To Die In A Woman's Prison"
10. "After Eggs"
11. "Tell It To The Raven"
12. "Whole Lotta Pappies"
