= The Men Who Loved Music =

Studio album by Young Fresh Fellows
- Released: 1987
- Genre: Rock music
- Label: Frontier Records
- Producer: Conrad Uno

Young Fresh Fellows chronology
Topsy Turvy (1985)	The Men Who Loved Music (1987)	Totally Lost (1988)

Professional ratings
Review scores
Source	Rating
AllMusic	4.5/5 stars
Robert Christgau	B+

The Men Who Loved Music is the third album by rock band Young Fresh Fellows. Their first for Frontier Records, it was released in 1987. The seventh track, "Amy Grant," was a college radio hit.

Tracks 1–14 are from the original release of "The Men Who Loved Music" (spine title: "Chicago 19"). Tracks 16–21 on the CD reissue are from the EP "Refreshments" (spine title: "Condiments"). Track 15 ("Happy Death Theme") was cut from the original album release for space reasons, and is available only on the combined CD. The reissue CD does not contain the "Young Fresh Fellows Theme" (remix), which was on the original vinyl release of "Refreshments."

Track 22 is listed in some music databases as "Do the Fonzie." The face of the CD is illustrated with a picture of the character Fonzie, from the TV show Happy Days.

== Track listing ==
All songs written by Scott McCaughey.

1. Just Sit
2. TV Dream
3. Get Outta My Cave
4. Why I Oughta
5. Unimaginable Zero Summer
6. When The Girls Get Here
7. Amy Grant
8. Hank, Karen And Elvis
9. My Friend Ringo
10. Two Brothers
11. I Got My Mojo Working (And I Thought You'd Like To Know)
12. I Don't Let The Little Things Get Me Down
13. Ant Farm
14. Where The Hell Did They Go?
15. Happy Death Theme
16. Beer Money
17. Aurora Bridge
18. Broken Basket
19. Three Sides To This Story
20. Young Fresh Fellows Update Theme
21. Back Room Of The Bar
22. Untitled
