= The Lonesome Death of Buck McCoy =

Studio album by The Minus 5
- Released: May 5, 1997
- Recorded: 1996
- Studio: Ironwood, Litho, Seattle, Washington, United States; John & Stu's, Seattle; John Keane Studios, Athens, Georgia, United States; LowBeat, Seattle; Egg, Seattle; Water Music, Hoboken, New Jersey, United States
- Genre: Alternative rock; pop rock
- Length: 41:02
- Label: Hollywood
- Producer: Scott McCaughey

The Minus 5 chronology
| The Emperor of the Bathroom (1995) | The Lonesome Death of Buck McCoy (1997) | My Chartreuse Opinion (1997) |

The Lonesome Death of Buck McCoy is an album by American rock band The Minus 5. Their final release of new material for Hollywood Records, it was released in 1997. The album was met with positive reception from critics.

== Recording and release ==
The musicians making up The Minus 5 overlapped with the auxiliary touring members of R.E.M. and Tuatara; the musicians recorded The Lonesome Death of Buck McCoy alongside Mark Eitzel's West. The opportunity to record and tour with the material spurred Scott McCaughey to finish off songs that Peter Buck had started writing two years prior. The revolving door of performers supported all their releases (including Tuatara's Breaking the Ethers) with The Magnificent Seven Vs. the United States tour in 1997. This album was the first release from Hollywood Records imprint Malt Records.

== Critical reception ==
Professional ratings
Review scores
| Source | Rating |
|---|---|
| AllMusic | 4/5 stars |
| Entertainment Weekly | A |

The album has received positive reviews from critics, with Album of the Year characterizing consensus as a 90 out of 100, based on two reviews. The editorial staff of AllMusic Guide gave the album four out of five stars, with reviewer Stephen Thomas Erlewine writing that it was an improvement over their first full-length, Old Liquidator, with catchy songwriting and "charmingly ragged pop-rock". The review in No Depression concurred with the charming nature of the songwriting, tying it stylistically to 1960s pop music and concluding that McCaughey's first major label album is deserved. In Entertainment Weekly, Steven Mirkin compared the sound to Merseybeat acts and gave the album an A for "casually perfect crystalline pop".

== Commercial performance ==
The album reached 58 on CMJ New Music Monthly's Alternative Radio Airplay in August 1997. In 2003, McCaughey claimed in an interview that the album had only sold 5,000 copies, compared to the greater commercial success of some of the musicians who played on the album.

== Track listing ==
All songs written by Peter Buck and Scott McCaughey, except where noted:

1. "The Rest of the World" – 3:10
2. "Cross Every Line" – 4:01
3. "Empty Room" – 3:42
4. "Wasted Bandage" – 3:04
5. "Boeing Spacearium" (Buck, McCaughey, and Robert Pollard) – 3:27
6. "My Mummy's Dead" (John Lennon) – 2:30
7. "Moonshine Girl" – 3:20
8. "Popsycle Shoppe" – 2:47
9. "Wouldn't Want to Care" – 2:56
10. "Spidery Moon" – 2:42
11. "Bullfight" – 4:15
12. "Hate Me More" – 5:08

== Personnel ==
The Minus 5

- Jon Auer ("Admiral Boot")
- Chris Ballew ("Mr. MacAfee")
- Peter Buck ("Streetsinger") – guitar, associate production
- John Crist ("Calliope Bird")
- Dave Dederer ("Daughter")
- Jason Finn ("The Constable")
- John Keane ("Mr. Dawes, Jr.") – recording at John Keane's Studio
- Barrett Martin ("Santouri")
- Scott McCaughey ("Buck McCoy") – guitar, vocals, production, mixing, mastering, recording at LowBeat
- Mike McCready ("Winthrop")
- Christy McWilson ("Miss Polly")
- Robert Pollard ("Ancient Roomer") – vocals on "Boeing Spacearium", recording in Dayton
- Pony ("Nigel")
- Ken Stringfellow ("Martha")

Additional personnel

- Matt Bayles – engineering at Litho
- Art Chantry – artwork
- Ed Brooks – recording at Litho, mixing, executive production, associate production
- Mark Downey – choreography
- Rob Grenoble – recording at Water Music
- Mark Guenther – mastering
- Hammi Hammerschmidt – layout
- Nadine McCaughey – artwork
- Floyd Reitsma – assistant engineering
- Jason Rowe – engineering at Ironwood
- Todd Rundgren – recording at Location, Neverland
- Robert Seidenberg – choreography
- Kevin Suggs – recording at John & Stu's
- Conrad Uno – recording at Egg
- Kevin Wilson – painting
