= Death Alley =

Studio album by Zeke
- Released: 2001
- Genre: Hardcore punk, hard rock, heavy metal
- Length: 28:24
- Label: Aces and Eights Records

Zeke chronology
| Dirty Sanchez (2000) | Death Alley (2001) | Split (2005) |

Professional ratings
Review scores
| Source | Rating |
|---|---|
| AllMusic | 4/5 stars |

Death Alley is a studio album by the hardcore punk band Zeke. It was released in 2001 on Aces and Eights Records.

"Death Alley," the last song on the album, is used in the game Tony Hawk's Pro Skater 4.

"Evil Woman" quotes "High Priest Of Rhythmic Noise," by Cheap Trick.

== Critical reception ==
Exclaim! wrote: "Zeke strike back yet again with their super-aggressive Motörhead/Dwarves-influenced spazz punk, and this time there's an even sharper focus on the metallic 'thunder stick' work." The Stranger called the album "a steely masterpiece."

== Track listing ==
All tracks are written by Zeke.

| No. | Title | Length |
|---|---|---|
| 1. | "Crossroads" | 1:38 |
| 2. | "Live Wire" | 1:40 |
| 3. | "Jack Torrance" | 1:02 |
| 4. | "Evil Dead" | 1:12 |
| 5. | "Arkansas Man" | 2:55 |
| 6. | "Shockwaves" | 1:24 |
| 7. | "Mountain Man" | 1:44 |
| 8. | "Evil Woman" | 2:00 |
| 9. | "The River" | 2:34 |
| 10. | "Night Rider" | 1:34 |
| 11. | "Into the Night" | 1:08 |
| 12. | "On the Run" | 2:11 |
| 13. | "Animal" | 1:23 |
| 14. | "Road Ahead" | 2:16 |
| 15. | "Eyes of Satan" | 1:32 |
| 16. | "Death Alley" | 2:15 |
