= Love Battery =

American rock band

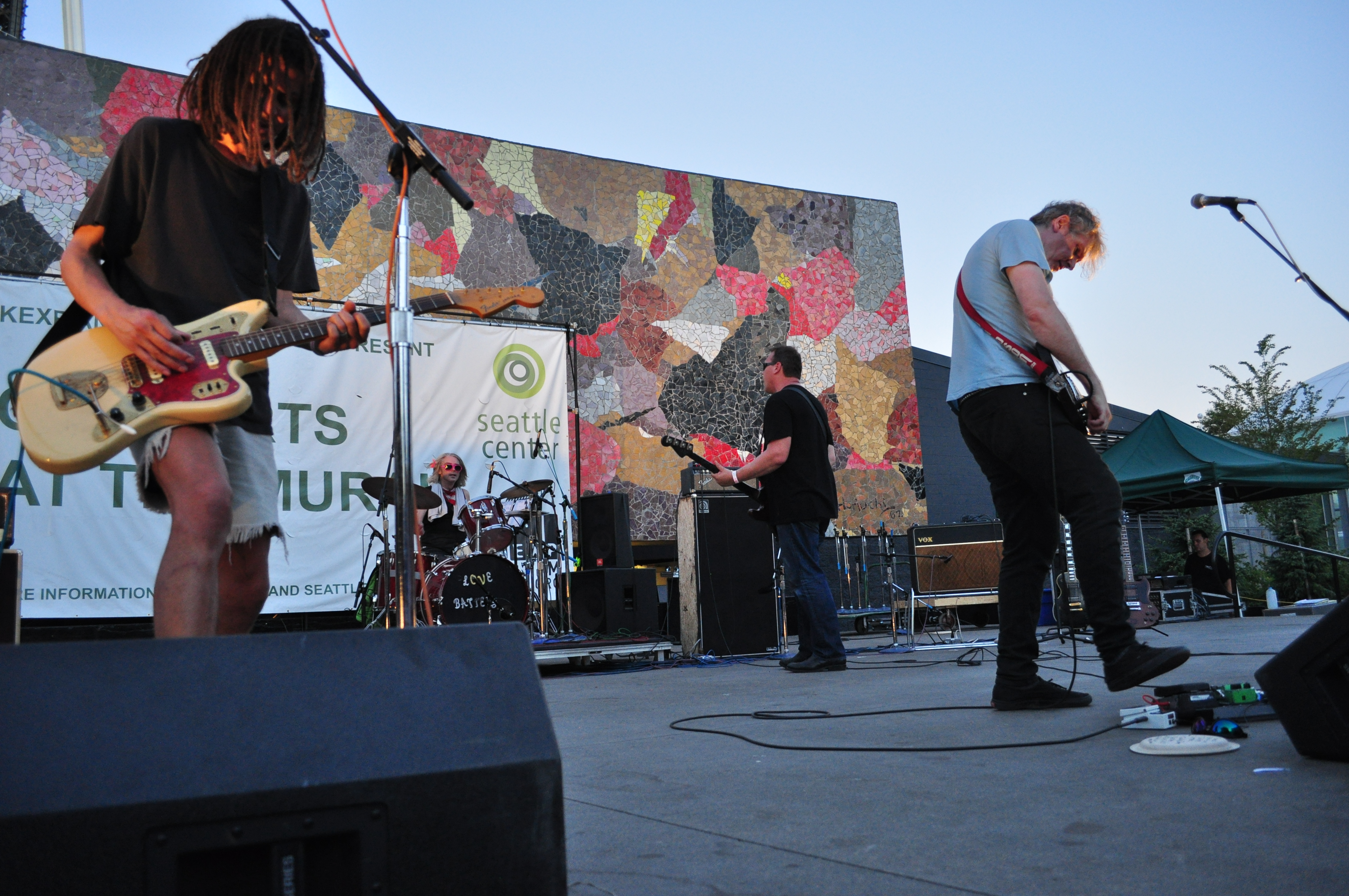
- Love Battery, 2012. Left to right: Kevin Whitworth, Ben Ireland, Chris Eckman, Ron Nine.

Background information
- Origin: Seattle, Washington, U.S.
- Genres: Alternative rock; grunge; psychedelic rock; indie rock
- Years active: 1989–2002; 2006; 2011–2012; 2018–present
- Labels: Sub Pop, Atlas Records, C/Z
- Members: Ron Nine; Kevin Whitworth; Bruce Fairweather; Cassady Laton
- Past members: Dan Peters; Tommy Simpson; Jason Finn; Jim Tillman; Mike Musburger; Ben Ireland; Chris Eckman
- Website: eskimo.com/~tracyr/LoveBat.html

Love Battery is an American rock band from Seattle, Washington. They were commonly associated with the grunge genre, although their music also contained elements of psychedelic rock and indie rock. They released five albums during the 1990s, followed by a sixth album in 2026. Frontman Ron Nine and guitarist Kevin Whitworth have been the only consistent members of the band throughout their existence.

The band released their debut single in 1989, "Between the Eyes", via Sub Pop Records. It became one of the band's most recognizable songs. Their debut album, Between the Eyes, was initially released in 1990 as a mini-album, but was then reissued as a full-length album in 1991. The band found further success in 1992 with their second album Dayglo, which featured their first music video "Out of Focus". After the release of 1993's Far Gone, Love Battery signed to the major label Atlas Records. Their only album for the label, Straight Freak Ticket, was released in 1995. The band then released their fifth album in 1998, Confusion Au Go Go, through C/Z Records. Love Battery disbanded in 2002, followed by a few sporadic reunions throughout the 2000s and 2010s. In 2018, the band reconvened for a longer term, which led to their sixth album in 2026, Through a Crack in the Matrix.

== History ==
=== Formation, Between the Eyes, and critical success of Dayglo (1989–1992) ===
Love Battery was formed in 1989 by former rock band Room Nine leader Ron Nine (born as Ron Rudzitis), guitarist Kevin Whitworth (ex-Crisis Party), bassist Tommy "Bonehead" Simpson (also ex-Crisis Party), and Mudhoney drummer Dan Peters. Their name came from a song of the same name by British punk band the Buzzcocks.

Before releasing their first single Peters left the group and was replaced by ex-Skin Yard drummer Jason Finn. With this lineup the band released their debut single "Between the Eyes" for seminal Seattle record label Sub Pop. The band released their debut EP/mini-album Between the Eyes in 1990 on Tupelo Recordings. By the middle of 1990 Simpson had been replaced by ex-U-Men bassist Jim Tillman. Between the Eyes was then expanded and released as their first official full-length album in 1991 via Sub Pop (which included three additional tracks with Tillman on bass).

Following Between the Eyes were the "Foot" and "Out of Focus" singles. Both singles later appeared on 1992's Dayglo album. In the Sub Pop catalog, Dayglo was listed as "Blotter not included" (a play on "Batteries not included" instead referring to LSD). Soon after, Tillman left to pursue other interests. He was replaced at first by original bassist Simpson, who in turn was replaced by ex-Green River and Mother Love Bone guitarist-turned-bassist Bruce Fairweather.

=== Far Gone and major label signing for Straight Freak Ticket (1993–1996) ===
In 1993 the Far Gone album appeared, which to many was considered a disappointment following Dayglo's critical success. Initially Far Gone was to be released by PolyGram Records but due to contractual problems with Sub Pop, Far Gone was dumped by the major label. Instead an inferior "rough mix" of the album was released by Sub Pop, a problem which Love Battery planned to rectify by remixing and reissuing but never did.

Following the Far Gone fiasco, Love Battery signed with Atlas Records in 1994. Notably, Love Battery's signing in 1994 happened much later than many of their other Seattle peers' major label debuts. Atlas releasing the "Nehru Jacket" single in late 1994, the band's fourth album Straight Freak Ticket was released in 1995; however, the album turned in poor sales overall. Videos were made for the songs "Fuzz Factory" and "Harold's Pink Room". In 1996 Love Battery was featured in the documentary Hype!, chronicling the rise of the Seattle grunge music scene. A clip was shown of a live performance of "Between the Eyes". Shortly thereafter Finn left the group to focus on The Presidents of the United States of America, a band that attained mainstream success by 1996.

=== Return to independent labels, Confusion Au Go Go, and first hiatus (1997–2005) ===
A prolonged period of uncertainty ensued following Finn's departure. Initially, Finn's technician from The Presidents of the United States of America, ex-Posies and Fastbacks drummer Mike Musburger, had joined on drums. He was then replaced by original drummer Peters by 1997, which by that point Love Battery had departed from Atlas. The band returned to an independent label (Let Down Records) for the "Snipe Hunt" single in 1998. Later that same year, C/Z Records released Love Battery's fifth album Confusion Au Go Go. Contributions from drummers Finn and Musburger appeared on a few songs, but Peters had ultimately done the majority of the drumming on the album.

Following the release of Confusion Au Go Go, Love Battery ceased touring on a full-time basis. A few one-off performances were made between 1999 and 2002 which featured the return of Simpson on bass and Finn on drums. After a handful of live shows in 2002, the band quietly entered an extended hiatus for the first time.

=== Various reunions and Through a Crack in the Matrix (2006–present) ===
After a prolonged period of inactivity the band played their first show in four years on June 23, 2006, at Neumo's in Seattle, WA. The lineup consisted of Nine, Whitworth, Simpson, and Musburger.

Love Battery reunited amidst the individual members' other projects to perform at The Mix in Seattle, Washington on October 22, 2011. Nine and Whitworth had enlisted bassist Chris Eckman and drummer Ben Ireland to complete the lineup. In 2012, they performed in venues such as LoFi Performance Gallery on May 19, the Mural Amphitheatre on August 20, and the Comet Tavern on September 29 alongside artists such as Atomic Bride, Summer Babes, and Blood Orange Paradise. On their Myspace page, they announced plans to release new material in the following year, which ultimately never came to fruition. Nine and Whitworth instead teamed up with bassist Kurt Danielson (Tad), drummer Garrett Shavlik (The Fluid), and vocalist Katie Scarberry in a band called Vaporland. They released their self-titled debut album in 2014.

The Dayglo lineup of Love Battery (Nine, Whitworth, Tillman, and Finn) reunited in 2018 to play the Dayglo album in its entirety at several Seattle shows. In late 2022, a Love Battery album got remastered for the first time as Jackpot Records handled the Dayglo reissue on vinyl. The Dayglo lineup also reunited for a one-off performance in October of that same year. By the end of the year, Cassady Laton had joined on drums. In 2024, Love Battery was announced as a headliner on the second stage of Seattle's Freakout Festival, which also included the return of Fairweather on bass. Love Battery announced their sixth studio album in 2026, titled Through a Crack in the Matrix, with Flotation Records cited as the label. Two shows with Swervedriver were booked for the end of 2026 as well.

== Influences ==
Love Battery cited influences including Butthole Surfers, Scratch Acid, Dinosaur Jr., Mudhoney and Nirvana.

== Band members ==
=== Current members ===
- Ron Nine – vocals, guitars (1989–2002, 2006, 2011–2012, 2018–present)
- Kevin Whitworth – guitars (1989–2002, 2006, 2011–2012, 2018–present)
- Bruce Fairweather – bass (1992–1999, 2024–present)
- Cassady Laton – drums (2022–present)

=== Former members ===
- Dan Peters – drums (1989, 1997–2000)
- Tommy Simpson – bass (1989–1990, 1992, 1999–2002, 2006)
- Jason Finn – drums (1989–1996, 2000–2002, 2018–2022)
- Jim Tillman – bass (1990–1992, 2018–2024)
- Mike Musburger – drums (1996–1997, 2006)
- Ben Ireland – drums (2011–2012)
- Chris Eckman – bass (2011–2012)

== Discography ==
=== Albums ===
- Between the Eyes (Tupelo Recordings, 1990) (Note: Between the Eyes was initially released as an EP/mini-album in 1990 but was expanded into a full-length album the following year.)
- Dayglo (Sub Pop Records, 1992)
- Far Gone (Sub Pop Records, 1993)
- Straight Freak Ticket (Atlas Records, 1995)
- Confusion Au Go Go (C/Z Records, 1998)
- Through a Crack in the Matrix (Flotation Records, 2026)

=== Singles ===
- "Between the Eyes" (Sub Pop Records, 1989)
- "Foot" (Sub Pop Records, 1991)
- "Out of Focus" (Sub Pop Records, 1991)
- "Half Past You" (Sub Pop Records, 1993)
- "Nehru Jacket" (Atlas Records, 1994)
- "Fuzz Factory" (Atlas Records, 1995)
- "Harold's Pink Room" (Atlas Records, 1995)
- "Snipe Hunt" (Let Down Records, 1998)

=== Compilation/Soundtrack contributions ===
- "Between the Eyes" on The Grunge Years (Sub Pop Records, 1991)
- "I Just Can't Be Happy Today" on Another Damned Seattle Compilation (Dashboard Hula Girl Records, 1991)
- "Ball and Chain" on Milk For Pussy (Mad Queen Records, 1994)
- "No Matter What You Do" on We're All Normal And We Want Our Freedom: A Tribute To Arthur Lee and Love (Alias Records, 1994)
- "White Bird" on Star Power! (Pravda Records, 1995)
- "Fuzz Factory" on Turn It Up & Pass It On, Volume 1 (1995)
- "Straight Freak Show" on huH Magazine CD6 (promo only) (RayGun Press, 1995)
- "Out of Focus (Live)" on Bite Back: Live At The Crocodile Cafe (PopLlama Records, 1996)
- "Color Blind" on Home Alive: The Art of Self-Defense (Epic Records, 1996)
- "Commercial Suicide" on Teriyaki Asthma, Vols. 6–10 (C/Z Records, 1999)
- "Between the Eyes" on The Birth of Alternative Vol. 2 (Flashback Records, 2003)
- "Half Past You" on Sleepless in Seattle: The Birth of Grunge (LiveWire Recordings, 2006)
- "Out of Focus" on Teen Spirit: MOJO Presents 15 Noise-Filled Classics from the American Underground Scene 1989–1992 (MOJO Records, 2017)
