= The Fabulous Sounds of the Pacific Northwest =

Studio album by Young Fresh Fellows
- Released: 1984
- Genre: Rock music
- Length: 36:30
- Label: PopLlama
- Producer: Conrad Uno

Young Fresh Fellows chronology
The Fabulous Sounds of the Pacific Northwest (1984)	Topsy Turvy (1985)

Professional ratings
Review scores
Source	Rating
AllMusic	3.5/5 stars

The Fabulous Sounds of the Pacific Northwest is the debut album by rock band the Young Fresh Fellows. It was released on PopLlama in 1984.

The album title and cover were inspired by an actual record from the early 1960s. The original was produced by the regional phone company Pacific Northwest Bell and was intended to promote tourism in the Pacific Northwest region. Interspersed among the 15 songs on the Young Fresh Fellows album are eight sound clips taken from the original record.

The album was re-released on compact disc as a two-for-one with the second Young Fresh Fellows album, Topsy Turvy.

== Track listing ==
1. "Rock 'n' Roll Pest Control" – 2:51
2. "All Messed Up" – 2:21
3. "Gus Theme" – 1:58
4. "Think Better of Me" – 2:22
5. "Power Mowers Theme" – 1:57
6. "Empty Set Takes a Vacation" – 2:06
7. "View from Above" – 3:30
8. "Big House" – 2:31
9. "This Little Mystery" – 1:50
10. "A Humble Guy" – 1:45
11. "Down by the Pharmacy" – 2:15
12. "Teenage Dogs in Trouble" – 2:14
13. "You Call That Lonely?" – 2:50
14. "That Letter" – 2:36
15. "Young Fresh Fellows Theme" – 2:56
