= I Don't Know Who I Am (Let the War Against Music Begin Vol. 2) =

Compilation album by The Minus 5
- Released: 2003
- Genre: Rock music
- Label: Return to Sender Records

The Minus 5 chronology
Let the War Against Music Begin (2001)	I Don't Know Who I Am (Let the War Against Music Begin Vol. 2) (2003)	Down With Wilco (2003)

Professional ratings
Review scores
Source	Rating
AllMusic	3/5 stars
Pitchfork	7.4/10

I Don't Know Who I Am (Let the War Against Music Begin Vol. 2) is a compilation album by American rock band The Minus 5. Consisting of extras from the Let the War Against Music Begin sessions, it contained new songs as well as songs that would later be released on proper albums.

The original pressing was only available through mail order via Return to Sender Records, and was initially limited to 2,000 copies.

== Track listing ==
1. "There Is No Music"
2. "Myrna Loy"
3. "When God Made Time"
4. "Rooting for the Plague"
5. "Tunnel of Lungs"
6. "Lonely Galaxy"
7. "I Don't Want to Fuck Off Anymore"
8. "Queen's Head"
9. "Saturn Is a Place on Earth"
10. "Shut Up"
11. "Submachine Girl"
12. "Disaster Nurse Fang (remix)"
13. "Reason I Quit (Dear Employer)"
