= True Crime (album) =

Compilation album by Zeke
- Released: 1999
- Recorded: 1993–1996
- Genre: Punk rock
- Label: Dropkick Records

Zeke chronology
Kicked In The Teeth (1998)	True Crime (1999)	Pinstriping Dutchman's Coffina: Von Dutch Tribute (1999)

Professional ratings
Review scores
Source	Rating
AllMusic	link
Kerrang!	4/5 stars

True Crime is a live Zeke album recorded between 1993 and 1996. It was released by the Australian record company Dropkick Records on CD and LP format. The album is currently out of print, making copies of it rare and collectible. The cover is a picture of "Night Stalker" Richard Ramirez being arrested.

== Track listing ==
Side one

1. "Fight in the Storeroom" (1:07)
2. "Donde Esta" (1:49)
3. "Maybe Someday" (0:35)
4. "Schmidt Valu Pack" (1:33)
5. "Spoonful of Soul" (1:19)
6. "Dilaudid" (2:21)
7. "It's Alright" (2:05)
8. "Love Gun" (1:15)

Side two

1. "Holley 750" (2:05)
2. "Overkill" (1:15)
3. "Mystery Train" (1:42)
4. "Slut" (0:55)
5. "Wanna Fuck" (1:23)
6. "Chiva Kneivel" (1:56)
7. "t-500" (0:54)
8. "Raped" (1:17)
