= The La Donnas =

- Origin: Denver, Colorado, United States
- Genres: Punk rock, rock
- Years active: 1996 – 2001
- Labels: Scooch Pooch Records; Sub Pop Records; Epitaph Records
- Past members: Ross Kersten – vocals, guitar; Ben Jacobs – guitar; Robb Bechtold – bass; Forrest Bartosh – drums

The La Donnas (also stylized LaDonnas) is a rock band formed in 1996 in Denver, Colorado by Ross Kersten. The La Donnas have toured extensively in the United States and Europe. They have shared the stage with Nashville Pussy, the Bellrays, New Bomb Turks, Gaza Strippers, Zeke, among others. The band disbanded in 2001. Ross Kersten went on to form The Mochines.

== Discography ==
Albums

- 1996 — Shady Lane
- 1998 — Rock You All Night Long
- 2001 — Complicated Fun

EP

- 1995 — LaDonnaland

7"

- 1995 — Long Legs/Counter Unload
- 1997 — Invasion/End of the Devil Dogs
- 1999 — Pick Up Your Soul / Heaven Sent / Who's Who of Love

Compilation appearances

- 1997 — The Thing From Another World "Your Last Chance to Rock 'n' Roll Baby!"
- 1998 — Ox-Compilation No. 32 - PANK!
