= The Minus 5 (album) =

Studio album by The Minus 5
- Released: February 7, 2006
- Recorded: 2005
- Genre: Rock
- Label: Yep Roc

The Minus 5 chronology
At the Organ (2004)	The Minus 5 (2006)	Sad Hasselhoff (2008)

Professional ratings
Review scores
Source	Rating
AllMusic	3.5/5 stars
No Depression	Favorable
Pitchfork	6.7/10

The Minus 5 is the self-titled seventh full-length album by American rock band The Minus 5. Featuring a lineup of Scott McCaughey, Peter Buck (of R.E.M.), Bill Rieflin, and John Ramberg, it was released in 2006 on Yep Roc Records. The album features contributions from Kelly Hogan, Colin Meloy of The Decemberists, and Sean Nelson of Harvey Danger. It is often referred to as "The Gun Album."

== Track listing ==
1. Rifle Called Goodbye – 3:02
2. Aw Shit Man – 1:41
3. Out There on the Maroon – 2:37
4. My Life as a Creep – 2:21
5. With a Gun – 4:33
6. Cemetery Row – 3:32
7. Twilight Distillery – 2:57
8. Cigarettes Coffee and Booze – 4:25
9. Leftover Life to Kill – 4:23
10. Hotel Senator – 2:56
11. Bought a Rope – 4:11
12. All Worn Out – 2:19
13. Original Luke – 3:02

Japanese edition bonus tracks

14. All the Time – 4:19
15. Teenage Idol – 2:35
