= Killingsworth (album) =

Album by The Minus 5

Studio album by the Minus 5
- Released: 2009
- Recorded: 2008
- Genre: Alternative rock
- Length: 41:39
- Language: English
- Label: Yep Roc

The Minus 5 chronology
Sad Hasselhoff (2008)	Killingsworth (2009)	Butcher Covered (2009)

Professional ratings
Review scores
Source	Rating
AllMusic	4/5 stars
Consequence of Sound	4/5 stars
Filter	84%
No Depression	Favorable
Pitchfork Media	6.9/10
PopMatters	9/10 stars

Killingsworth is the eighth studio album by the Minus 5, released by Yep Roc Records in 2009. The album was a collaboration with the Portland, Oregon–based indie rock band the Decemberists.

== Track listing ==
All songs written by Scott McCaughey, except where indicated

1. "Dark Hand of Contagion" (Timothy Bracy, McCaughey) – 3:23
2. "The Long Hall" – 3:04
3. "The Disembowlers" – 3:10
4. "The Lurking Barrister" – 3:05
5. "It Won't Do You Any Good" – 1:50
6. "Vintage Violet" – 2:40
7. "Scott Walker's Fault" – 3:08
8. "Big Beat Up Moon" (McCaughey, Willy Vlautin) – 3:11
9. "I Would Rather Sacrifice You" – 2:58
10. "Ambulance Dancehall" – 2:51
11. "Gash in the Cocoon" – 3:57
12. "Smoke On, Jerry" – 3:13
13. "Your Favorite Mess" – 2:18
14. "Tonight You're Buying Me a Drink, Bub" – 2:51

== Personnel ==
The Minus 5

- Peter Buck – 12-string guitar, mandolin, Fender Bass 6
- Scott McCaughey – vocals, acoustic guitar, piano, Farfisa, Mellotron
- John Moen – drums, percussion, backing vocals

Additional musicians

- Jenny Conlee – piano, pump organ, accordion, organ
- Chris Funk – banjo, autoharp, marxophone, dobro
- Tucker Jackson – pedal steel guitar
- Colin Meloy – lead vocals on 7
- Nate Query – upright bass, electric bass guitar
- The She Bee Gees – backing vocals
- Little Sue – backing vocals
- Annalisa Tornfelt – fiddle
- Ken Stringfellow – backing vocals
- Ezra Holbrook – drums
- Steve Turner – electric guitar
- Rachael Blumberg – drums
- Mike Coykendall – bass, backing vocals
- Kurt Bloch – electric guitar
- Dave Depper
- Adam Selzer
