= Zeke (band) =

American hardcore punk band

- Origin: Seattle, Washington, U.S.
- Genres: Hardcore punk, hard rock, heavy metal, speed metal
- Years active: 1992–present
- Labels: Epitaph, Relapse
- Members: Blind Marky Felchtone; Donny Paycheck; Jason Freeman; Jeff Hiatt
- Past members: Jeff Hiatt; Chris Johnsen; Buzzy; Kurt Colfelt; Jeff Matz; Mark Pierce; Abe Zanuel Riggs III; Dizzy Lee Roth; Kyle Whitefoot; Dayne Porras
- Website: zekeyou.com

Zeke /ˈziːk/ is an American hardcore punk band from Seattle, Washington, formed in 1992. They are known for their extremely fast, energetic guitar sound. Zeke mixes this with strong influences from hard rock, and occasionally blues rock, and are often compared to Motörhead.

Zeke has released six full-length studio albums. Their first single, "West Seattle Acid Party", came out in 1992; after several album releases on indie label Scooch Pooch Records, they signed with Epitaph in 1998. They are currently signed to Relapse Records. They are featured in several soundtracks from video games such as the song "Death Alley" was on Tony Hawk's Pro Skater 4, the song "Long Train Runnin'" appeared on Tony Hawk's Underground 2, and "Kill the King" appeared on Tony Hawk's Project 8. Zeke appeared on the Project Gotham Racing 4 soundtrack. Zeke released a digital EP entitled Lords of the Highway in 2007. It includes the tracks "Lords of the Highway", "Kings and Queens" and "Hay Bailer", as well as a cover of GG Allin's "Die When You Die".

Zeke recorded Hellbender in 2017, 13 years after their last full LP 'Til the Livin' End.

== Members ==
Current

- Guitar, vocals: Blind Marky Felchtone
- Guitar: Jeff Hiatt
- Bass: Jason Freeman
- Drums: Donny Paycheck

Former

- Guitar: Abe "Sonny" Zanuel Riggs III (+24/09/2022), Dizzy Lee Roth, Chris Johnsen, Kyle Whitefoot
- Bass: Jeff Matz, Mark Pierce, Kurt Kolfelt
- Drums: Dayne Porras, Buzzy

Original

- Guitar, vocals: Blind Marky Felchtone
- Guitar: Dizzy Lee Roth
- Bass: Mark Pierce
- Drums: Donny Paycheck

== Discography ==
- Super Sound Racing (IFA, 1994) (Scooch Pooch (reissue), 1995) (Relapse (reissue) 2008)
- Flat Tracker (Scooch Pooch, 1996) (Relapse (reissue) 2008)
- PIG (live 7"), (Man's Ruin, 1997)
- Kicked in the Teeth (Epitaph, 1998)
- True Crime (Dropkick, 1999)
- Pinstriping the Dutchman's Coffin: Von Dutch Tribute (1999)
- Dirty Sanchez (Epitaph, 2000)
- Death Alley (Aces and Eights, 2001)
- Live and Uncensored (live album, 2003)
- 'Til the Livin' End (Relapse, 2004)
- Split 7" w/ Disfear (Relapse, 2004)
- Split CD & 10" w/ Peter Pan Speedrock (Bitzcore, 2005)
- Lords of the Highway (Digital release and 7") (Relapse, 2007)
- Hellbender (Relapse, 2018)
- Ride Hard Ride Free (7 inch, Hound Gawd! Records, 2023)

== Compilations ==
- Contaminated VI
- We're a Happy Family: A Tribute to Ramones
- Mad Mike Jones Presents Mototrax 1
- How We Rock
- Alpha Motherfuckers: A Tribute to Turbonegro
- Free the West Memphis 3: A Benefit For...
- Punk-O-Rama Vol. 5
- Serial Killer Compilation
- Free Air Festival
- A Fistful of Rock 'N Roll Vol. 1
- Built for Speed: A Motörhead Tribute
- Of Things to Come (soundtrack)
- Punk-O-Rama Vol. 4: Straight Outta the Pit
- Punk-O-Rama Vol. 3
- Goin' After Pussy: Teasers & Tidbits
- Live at the Colourbox Vol. 2
- Pogo, Strut, Slam, Swivel & Mosh
- Scooch Pooch Plays: Their Original Sins
