= Ramsey class =

Class satisfying a generalization of Ramsey's theorem

In the area of mathematics known as Ramsey theory, a Ramsey class is one which satisfies a generalization of Ramsey's theorem.

Suppose $A$, $B$ and $C$ are structures and $k$ is a positive integer. We denote by $\binom{B}{A}$ the set of all subobjects $A'$ of $B$ which are isomorphic to $A$. We further denote by $C \rightarrow (B)^A_k$ the property that for all partitions $X_1 \cup X_2\cup \dots\cup X_k$ of $\binom{C}{A}$ there exists a $B' \in \binom{C}{B}$ and an $1 \leq i \leq k$ such that $\binom{B'}{A} \subseteq X_i$.

Suppose $K$ is a class of structures closed under isomorphism and substructures. We say the class $K$ has the A-Ramsey property if for ever positive integer $k$ and for every $B\in K$ there is a $C \in K$ such that $C \rightarrow (B)^A_k$ holds. If $K$ has the $A$-Ramsey property for all $A \in K$ then we say $K$ is a Ramsey class.

Ramsey's theorem is equivalent to the statement that the class of all finite sets is a Ramsey class.
