= The Young Fresh Fellows =

American rock group

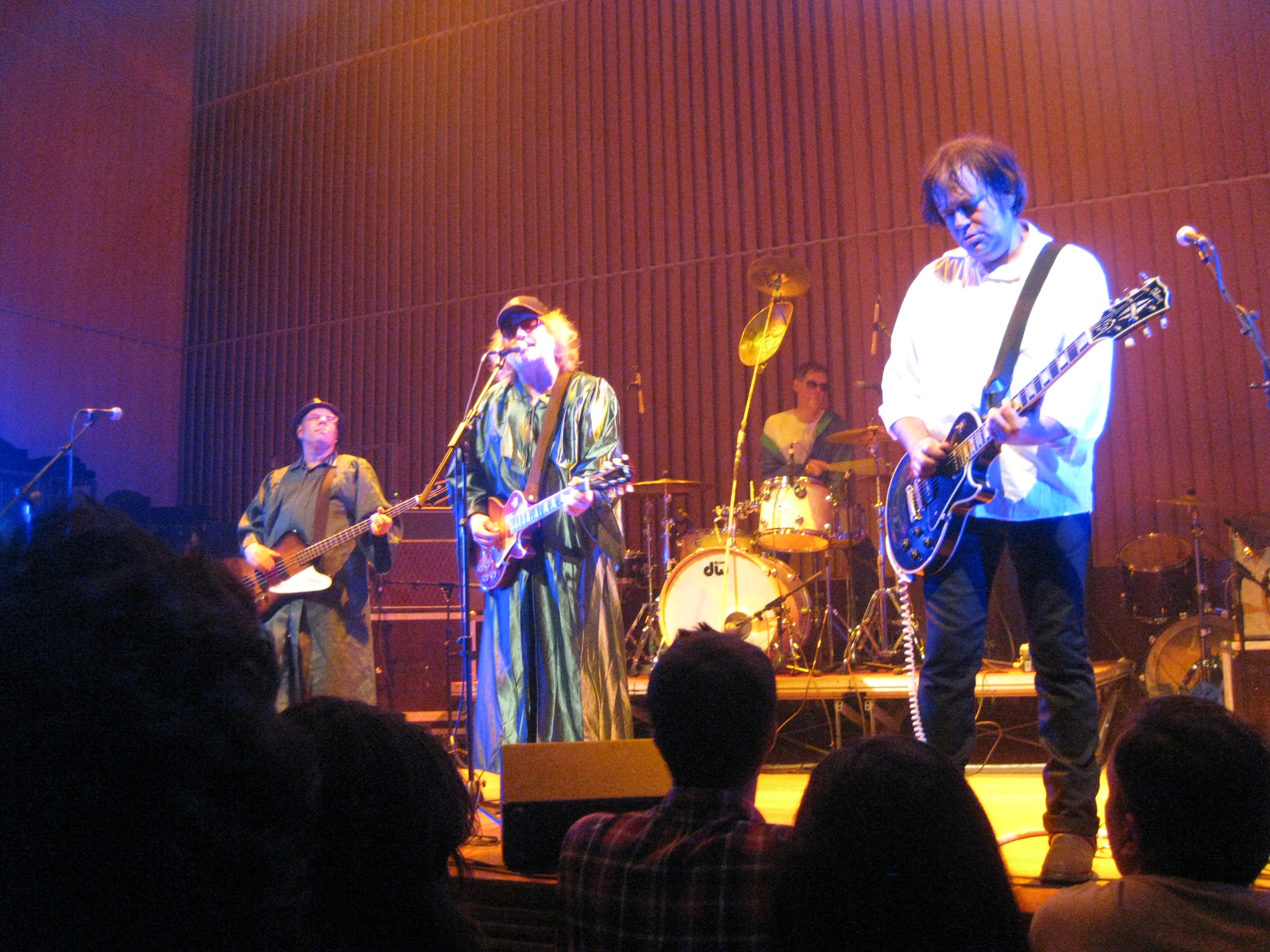
Young Fresh Fellows in Galicia, Spain

The Young Fresh Fellows are an American alternative rock group that was formed in 1981 in Seattle, Washington, United States, by Scott McCaughey and Chuck Carroll. Tad Hutchison, Chuck Carroll's first cousin, joined for the recording of the group's debut album in 1983.

== History ==
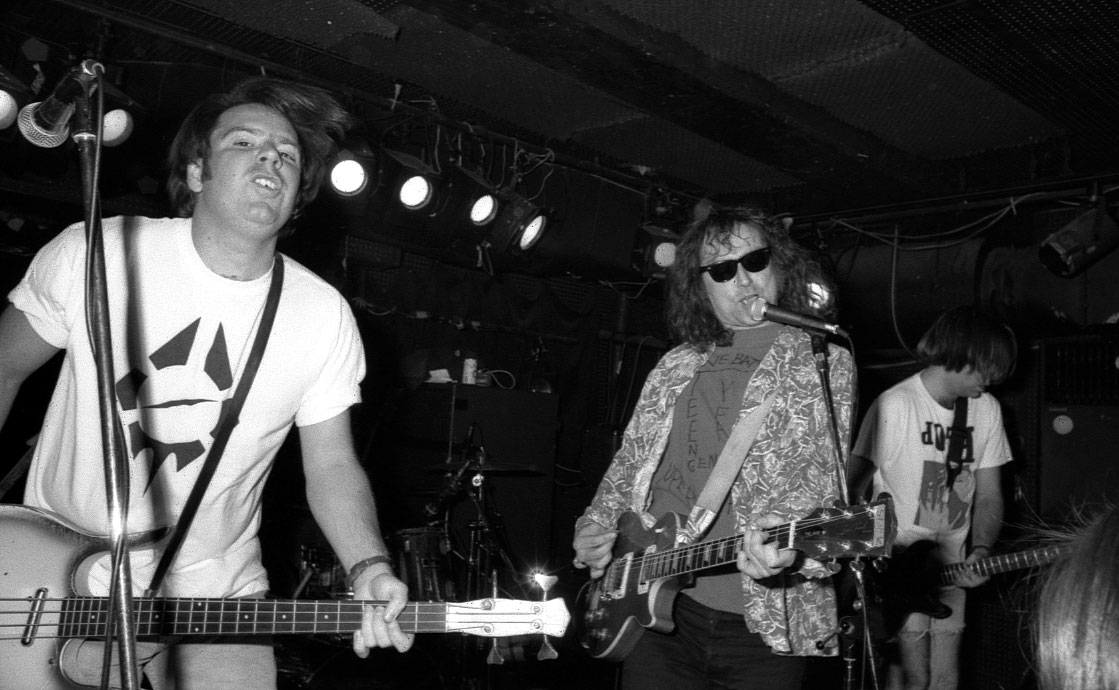
The Fellows in Japan

Their first album was The Fabulous Sounds of the Pacific Northwest (1984) after which Jim Sangster joined the group on bass and McCaughey switched from bass to guitar. Carroll left the group in early 1989 and was replaced by Kurt Bloch from The Fastbacks.

The song "Amy Grant", a comical song about Contemporary Christian music and pop music artist Amy Grant, from the album The Men Who Loved Music, was a success on college radio.

The band is still together, although after 1997's A Tribute to Music, they released no new material until Because We Hate You (2001), a split release with McCaughey's other band, the Minus 5. McCaughey has given more attention to the Minus 5 since then, while Bloch and Sangster have formed the band Thee Sgt. Major III, and Hutchison is working more on visual art and design, as well as performing/recording as Chris & Tad with Chris Ballew of The Presidents of the United States of America. The Fellows released I Think This Is in 2009 and embarked on a tour of Spain that October.

From 1994 to 2011, McCaughey was a "fifth member" of R.E.M., playing guitar with the band both onstage and in the studio.

The band was mentioned in the They Might Be Giants song "Twisting", and in "Big Salty Tears" by the Ziggens, which was later covered by Bradley Nowell of Sublime on the album Sublime Acoustic: Bradley Nowell & Friends.

The tribute album This One's for the Fellows (2004) features twenty covers of Young Fresh Fellows songs by artists including the Presidents of the United States of America, Robyn Hitchcock, and the Makers. The Presidents' cover was featured in "Benderama", an episode of Futurama.

== Discography ==
=== Albums ===
- The Fabulous Sounds of the Pacific Northwest (PopLlama, 1984)
- Topsy Turvy (PopLlama – 1985)
- The Men Who Loved Music (Frontier, 1987)
- Totally Lost (Frontier, 1988)
- Beans and Tolerance (Self-released, 1989)
- This One's For the Ladies (Frontier, 1989)
- Electric Bird Digest (Frontier, 1991)
- It's Low Beat Time (Frontier/Munster, 1992)
- A Tribute to Music (Rock & Roll Inc., 1997)
- Because We Hate You (Mammoth, 2001) – double CD split with The Minus 5
- I Think This Is (Yep Roc, 2009)
- I Don't Think This Is (Munster / Rock & Roll Inc., 2009) – four different tracks from the above, and different artwork
- Tiempo de Lujo (Yep Roc, 2012)
- Exit Ramp (Book Records, 2019)
- Toxic Youth (Yep Roc, 2020)
- Loft (Yep Rock, 2026)

=== EPs ===
- Temptation on a Saturday (CD/LP) – PopLlama/Munster – 1995

=== Official bootlegs ===
- Beans and Tolerance (attributed to 3 Young French Fellows 3)

=== "Fans only" cassettes ===
- Gag Fah – 1991

=== Compilations and live albums ===
- Refreshments – 1987 – Collection of singles
- Somos Los Mejores (CD/LP) – Munster Records −1991
- Hits From The Break Up Album – 1991 – Collection of singles
- Gleich Jetzt (CD) – 1+2 Records – 1992
- Take It Like A Matador (CD) – Record Runner – 1993
- Banana Pad Riot (CD/7") – Skull Duggery – 1996

=== Appearances ===
- Diamonds at a Discount – A Compilation of Frontier Recording Artists (LP) – Frontier Records – 1988 (contains their non-album single "I'm an Artiste on Frontier")

=== Tribute albums ===
- This One's for the Fellows (2004 – Blue Disguise Records).
