= The Minus 5 =

American pop rock band

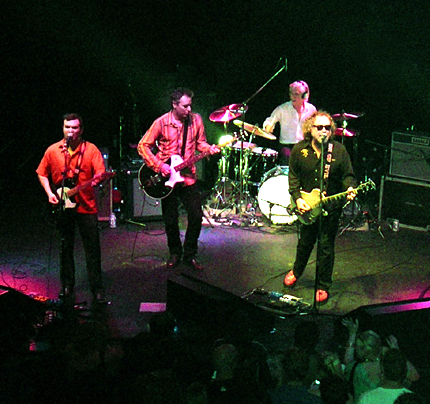
- The Minus 5 performing in 2006. From left to right: John Ramberg, Peter Buck, Bill Rieflin and Scott McCaughey.

Background information
- Also known as: The Bison-Flavored Minus 5, The Minus Tad
- Origin: Portland, Oregon, U.S.
- Genres: Indie rock; pop rock
- Years active: 1993–present
- Label: Yep Roc
- Members: See List of Minus 5 members
- Website: www.minus5.com

The Minus 5 is an American pop rock band headed by musician Scott McCaughey of Young Fresh Fellows, often in partnership with R.E.M. guitarist Peter Buck.

== Band history ==
McCaughey formed the band in 1993 as a side project with Buck, Jon Auer and Ken Stringfellow of the Posies. Buck had moved to the Seattle area in 1992; the other principals were longtime fixtures of the Seattle music scene. The four musicians had numerous personal and professional connections: both the Posies and McCaughey's the Young Fresh Fellows had recorded at Conrad Uno's Egg Studios and released albums on Uno's PopLlama Records label. The Young Fresh Fellows and the Posies were fixtures of Seattle's Crocodile Cafe, owned and managed by Buck's then-girlfriend (later wife) Stephanie Dorgan. The Young Fresh Fellows were the opening band at a Kevn Kinney gig at the Croc on July 4, 1992; Buck backed Kinney along with R.E.M.'s Mike Mills and Bill Berry.

The song titles of the group's earliest output—among them, "Loser So Supreme", "Drunkard's Lullaby", and "Brotherhood Of Pain"—are indicative of the downbeat nature of the band's initial output. Themes of alcoholism, death, and self-hatred are recurrent in each subsequent Minus 5 release. "McCaughey realized he had a dumptruck-load of songs that the Young Fresh Fellows would either never get around to, or would wisely choose not to," read one press release. "[Buck, Stringfellow and Auer] were quick to volunteer to help Scott capture his 'Let The Bad Times Roll' vision."

=== Hello Recording Club EP ===
The band assembled at Uno's Egg Studio in summer 1993 and recorded their debut EP for the Hello CD of the Month Club, a subscription-only mail order club run by John Flansburgh of They Might Be Giants. For this EP the band was supplemented by NRBQ members Tom Ardolino and Terry Adams and Young Fresh Fellows bassist Jim Sangster.

For this release only, the band's name was stylized as 'The Minus Five'; all subsequent releases have used a numeral. The EP was sent to subscribers as the December 1993/January 1994 release.

=== Live debut and 1994 recording sessions ===
The Minus 5 made their live debut at the Crocodile Cafe on November 9, 1993, on a bill supporting jangly indie heroes the Silos. As Auer and Stringfellow were in Europe touring behind the Posies' Frosting On The Beater, the Minus 5 performed as a duo with backing from the Silos' Walter Salas-Humara, Tom Freund and Manuel Versoza for the last three songs. The set included lively covers of Johnny Cash's "I Still Miss Someone" and Neil Young's "Barstool Blues", as well as four freshly-written McCaughey compositions.

Due to recording duties on R.E.M.'s Monster, Buck was away from Seattle for much of 1994, returning only briefly for the birth of his twin daughters. When mixing on R.E.M.'s album was complete, Buck turned his attention to McCaughey's new songs. The Minus 5 played their second show at the Crocodile Cafe on September 15, 1994, just a week before Monster's release. For this gig McCaughey, Buck and Stringfellow were joined by the Model Rockets' John Ramberg.

By fall 1994, McCaughey was caught up in the promotional blitz behind Monster, making his live debut with R.E.M. on Saturday Night Live November 12, 1994. McCaughey was subsequently recruited to join R.E.M. on their worldwide tour which kicked off in January 1995.

The Minus 5's cover of Johnny Cash's "I Still Miss Someone" was released on a 1994 German compilation titled Love Is My Only Crime – Part Two. The CD also featured rare or previously unreleased songs from the Young Fresh Fellows and future McCaughey collaborator Steve Wynn.

=== Old Liquidator ===
In April 1995, R.E.M. drummer Bill Berry suffered a brain aneurysm, causing more than two months of planned tour dates to be abruptly cancelled. In the unexpected downtime, McCaughey and Buck put the finishing touches on what would become the Minus 5's debut LP—at the time titled Last Call, Corporal.

The finished product, hastily retitled Old Liquidator, was at first a hard-to-find, low-key release on German indie label Glitterhouse. Though pressed in modest numbers and at first only available in the U.S. as an import, the cachet of being an 'R.E.M. side project' in 1995 was an irresistible lure to thirsty collectors. It wasn't long before Minneapolis distributor East Side Digital released the album in the U.S. as well.

Old Liquidator is haunted by the unexpected Christmas 1994 death of McCaughey's friend Jimmy Silva, who had collaborated with Young Fresh Fellows, Stringfellow, Uno and members of The Smithereens. "Worse," the second track on the album, was co-written with Silva. Other cuts such as "Story" are influenced by the surrealist imagery of mid-60s Bob Dylan, invoking fictional misadventures of figures including Franz Kafka.

Another inspiration is Nick Lowe, whose obscure 1979 B-side "Basing Street" is smothered here in the squealing distortion Buck patented on "Country Feedback." Elsewhere, Buck's exotic bouzouki and dulcimer textures proved welcome departures from Monster's fuzzed-out glam riffs. The Byrds-influenced Rickenbacker jangle of single "Emperor Of The Bathroom" is unmistakably Buck. Auer and Stringfellow are more tangible on this album, harmonizing amiably on opener "Winter Goes Away" and closing singalong "When It Comes My Way."

Old Liquidator begins The Minus 5's custom of numbering their releases, including singles, in chronological order. On the back cover, the subtitle "The Minus 5 No. 2 Record" is prominently displayed above the musicians' names.

A CD single for "The Emperor Of The Bathroom" was released in fall 1995 with alternate versions of three album cuts, a country-fried outtake called "Heartache For Sale" and a cover of the Fantastic Baggys' "This Little Woody."

When the Monster tour resumed in summer 1995, R.E.M. began recording what would later become the New Adventures In Hi-Fi album using recordings of new songs made in concert, at soundchecks, in dressing rooms and even on the tour bus. McCaughey, again called along for the ride, contributed significantly to these recordings playing piano, organ, synths and autoharp.

Between R.E.M. gigs on June 1, 1995, The Minus 5 played their first show outside of Seattle at the Lounge Ax in Chicago. Without Auer and Stringfellow, Buck and McCaughey were supported by Wilco frontman Jeff Tweedy, R.E.M. bassist Mike Mills, and Mark Greenberg. New songs "Moonshine Girl" and "Wouldn't Want To Care" were debuted alongside Johnny Cash, Nick Lowe, Gram Parsons and Porter Wagoner covers.

During another tour hiatus, The Minus 5 played gigs at the Tractor Tavern and Crocodile Cafe in Seattle at the end of August 1995. New song "Bullfight" was debuted at these shows, which featured Young Fresh Fellows and Fastbacks guitarist Kurt Bloch in addition to McCaughey, Buck and Auer.

In December 1995, The Minus 5 played two nights at the Crocodile Cafe in support of Kevn Kinney, supplemented by Screaming Trees' Barrett Martin on upright bass. The Minus 5 and Kevn Kinney also played at the Aladdin Theater in Portland as The Barrett Martin Quartet.

=== Hollywood Records deal and The Lonesome Death of Buck McCoy ===
The modest success of Old Liquidator and continued cultural cache of R.E.M. brought The Minus 5 a great deal of attention in 1996. Not only were the group signed to Disney-affiliated Hollywood Records, but the label agreed to finance a follow-up record and even reissue some of McCaughey's back catalog. Moreover, McCaughey was given his own label imprint, Malt Records, with distribution through Hollywood.

Though the bulk of recording for New Adventures In Hi-Fi had taken place on the road, Buck was occupied through early 1996 with recording and mixing the new R.E.M. album. Nonetheless, McCaughey and Buck continued to record in piecemeal sessions with Avast! engineer Kevin Suggs, Conrad Uno, John Keane, and Water Music's Rob Grenoble. In late summer, The Minus 5 played KISW's Pain In The Grass concert in support of The Posies, who were busy touring behind their 1996 release Amazing Disgrace. New songs "Cross Every Line" and "Empty Room" were premiered by a lineup including McCaughey, Buck, Auer, Stringfellow and John Ramberg.

New Adventures In Hi-Fi was released September 10, 1996. With no tour planned to promote the album, Buck was free to explore other musical pursuits. In early fall 1996, Buck embarked on two new musical collaborations: the instrumental supergroup Tuatara with Barrett Martin, and a collaborative album with American Music Club's Mark Eitzel. Martin joined the Minus 5 for a Crocodile Cafe gig on October 7, 1996, where new songs "Hate Me More" and "Dear Employer (The Reason I Quit") were debuted. McCaughey's then-wife Christy McWilson also joined the group for this show. The following week, Tuatara made their live debut at the Croc.

In December 1996, Buck booked a week with engineer Ed Brooks at Ironwood in Seattle to record Eitzel's West album. McCaughey, Martin, and Pearl Jam's Mike McCready were all on hand for the sessions. At the end of the sessions, The Minus 5 opened for Eitzel at the Crocodile Cafe. Martin and Eitzel both joined The Minus 5 for several songs and McCaughey premiered new song "Boeing Spacearium." The second Minus 5 full-length, dubbed The Lonesome Death of Buck McCoy, was completed at Ironwood shortly thereafter.

The Lonesome Death of Buck McCoy, cobbled together from McCaughey's many 1996 sessions, featured an impressive roster of guests including Guided by Voices' Robert Pollard, The Presidents of the United States of America, McWilson, Barrett Martin and Mike McCready. Unlike previous releases, each song was credited equally to McCaughey and Buck. In the liner notes each player was assigned a "role" as in a rock opera, with McCaughey himself playing "Buck McCoy" and others assuming roles like "Admiral Boot," "The Constable" and "Ancient Roomer." In reference to the creative process of the album, the liner notes provide a synopsis: "Little Buck McCoy wakes up born in the middle of a wheatfield. He decides to carry on alone, despite his many acquaintances, until dying years later."

The songs did not actually constitute a narrative or refer to these characters at all. Critics took note of the haphazard nature of the proceedings, which included Small Faces pastiche "Popsycle Shoppe" and a cover of John Lennon's harrowing "My Mummy's Dead." No Depression called the album "Surprisingly bitter froth...Most of the record's 12 songs quake with the severely compressed intimacy and hazy chamber-ballad tension of recent R.E.M. (no surprise) and John Lennon."

In early 1997, R.E.M. began the process of writing demos for a new album both in Athens in February and Buck's Hawaiian residence in April. The three albums Buck had contributed to in 1996 were all released within weeks of one another. Tuatara's Breaking The Ethers was released March 1, 1997, followed by Eitzel's West and The Lonesome Death of Buck McCoy on the same day: May 5, 1997. A U.S. tour was assembled that would allow Buck to tour both coasts with all three acts, under the title The Magnificent Seven vs. The United States. The Magnificent Seven referred to McCaughey, Stringfellow, Eitzel, Martin and the three remaining members of Tuatara—though counting Buck there were actually eight. American Music Club bassist Dan Pearson later joined the tour to augment Eitzel's sets. For this tour The Minus 5 consisted of Buck, McCaughey, Stringfellow, Martin, and Tuatara's Justin Harwood.

The tour kicked off May 1, 1997 with two hometown gigs at the Crocodile. Each show featured Tuatara and Eitzel performing two sets each, with a short Minus 5 set between and occasionally McCaughey performing solo. The 22-date tour continued for two months, with many media appearances along the way. Buck and Eitzel performed on KFOG in San Francisco, Late Night With Conan O'Brien and then on WBCN radio in Boston. All three groups played Morning Becomes Eclectic on KCRW in Santa Monica and Idiot's Delight on WNEW in New York. Near the end of the tour all three groups played a free in-store at New York record mecca Other Music.

The East Coast leg of the tour was peppered with surprise guests: Pearl Jam's Mike McCready and John Wesley Harding showed up in New York, Mike Mills joined The Minus 5 in Philadelphia and Atlanta, and Michael Stipe joined his R.E.M. bandmates for a four-song encore in Atlanta.

Reaction to the tour was mixed. None of the three records sold particularly well, and the critics' approval was tepid: "A three-hour marathon that was simply too much to absorb," Sara Scribner wrote in the Los Angeles Times. "The Minus 5, despite some catchy, jangling tunes from its new album...never got its footing." Geoffrey Himes wrote in The Washington Post: "Genuinely amusing when the tunes were bouncy and catchy, but the slow numbers didn't have the humor or melody to justify the dreary pacing."

In June 1997, Buck recorded some tracks with Robyn Hitchcock for his album Jewels For Sophia in Seattle. After the session, McCaughey joined Hitchcock and Buck for a Crocodile Cafe gig under the name "Popscyle Shoppe Incident: Viva Sea Tac II." Tim Keegan and Kurt Bloch joined in the set, and Young Fresh Fellows were the opening act.

=== Hollywood Records deluxe reissues ===
In August 1997, Hollywood Records reissued Old Liquidator and, curiously, McCaughey's 1989 solo album My Chartreuse Opinion in deluxe editions with bonus tracks. My Chartreuse Opinion, a Conrad Uno-recorded affair which featured cameos from Jimmy Silva and Christy McWilson, was now credited to "The Minus 5 of Scott McCaughey." The reissue actually featured fewer bonus tracks than the now out-of-print original release, which featured four unrelated Silva recordings at the end. Nonetheless, it was a great way of drawing attention to McCaughey's back catalog and much easier to find than the initial release. Old Liquidator was also expanded, adding two songs from the Hello Recording Club EP, "Heartache For Sale" from the "Emperor of the Bathroom" single, and two short instrumentals.

These would prove to be The Minus 5's final releases on Hollywood. Just weeks before the release of The Lonesome Death of Buck McCoy, longtime Hollywood Records president Bob Pfeifer resigned. Under a reorganization plan, Disney acquired established indie Mammoth Records for $25 million in an attempt to diversify its roster. Mammoth founder Jay Faires was now charged with breaking The Minus 5 to a larger audience, but industry watchers such as Variety's Adam Sandler questioned why Disney didn't focus on "pop music, which is a better fit with its TV and film programming, rather than indie-inspired repertoire."

=== McCaughey joins R.E.M. and Tuatara in the studio ===
While R.E.M. was in Georgia recording demos for what would become Up, The Minus 5 played its first two shows without Buck: at Chicago's Lounge Ax on August 16, 1997, the band consisted of McCaughey, Stringfellow, Jason Finn and Dharma Bums' Jim Talstra. The raucous gig was by far the band's longest to date: an 11-song McCaughey solo set followed by a 22-song Minus 5 powerhouse that included unreleased songs, several nuggets from My Chartreuse Opinion and covers of John Lennon and The Modern Lovers. The following week, McCaughey played a gig with John Wesley Harding at the Croc in Seattle which included a handful of Minus 5 tunes and as-yet-unreleased Young Fresh Fellows songs.

In October 1997, Bill Berry announced he was leaving R.E.M. Having completed more than eight months of writing and recording demos for Up, R.E.M. made the decision to continue as a three-piece. As the recording process continued in 1998, McCaughey became an important contributor in the studio, usually on keyboards. Ken Stringfellow and Barrett Martin were also recruited for some of these sessions. McCaughey was also roped into Tuatara in 1998, contributing three tracks to sophomore album Trading with the Enemy.

Near the end of 1997, The Minus 5 played the two-night Crocodile Cafe's An Evenings In Edenbrook Forest event, with a lineup that included McCaughey, Buck, Martin and John Ramberg. A special double CD compilation was given away at the shows which included The Minus 5's cover of The Modern Lovers' "Government Center" and rare or unreleased cuts from Young Fresh Fellows, The Lowe Beats (McCaughey's Nick Lowe cover band), The Model Rockets, Fastbacks and others. The CD was the inaugural release of Book Records, a new label McCaughey started for extremely limited or tour-only releases.

In 1999, the group accepted an invitation to participate in a tribute album to Moby Grape co-founder Skip Spence, who was terminally ill with cancer, for the purpose of raising funds to assist with medical expenses.

Since McCaughey had made The Minus 5 his primary musical outlet, new material from The Young Fresh Fellows had slowed to a trickle. In 1994 and 1995, the group had released three singles and an EP. Nonetheless, McCaughey often recorded new songs with the Fellows and by summer 1999, had enough to release as an album. A Tribute To Music was released on Spanish indie label Rock and Roll Inc. and never released in the U.S. Though most of the tracks were originals, the Fellows made an unremarkable pass at R.E.M.'s rocker "Circus Envy" on the LP. Considered a minor release by both fans and critics, A Tribute To Music left many wondering if McCaughey was saving his best tunes for his other band. "There's a tossed-off feeling to the record," Bart Bealmear wrote for AllMusic. "[Most of the songs] are missing the group's unique mix of humor, energy, spirit, and melody."

=== In Rock ===
On January 9, 2000, The Minus 5 played a secret show at Lounge Ax in Chicago, opening for Wilco (billed as "Summer Teeth") for 300 lucky fans. This was a farewell gig as the Lincoln Park venue would shut its doors just one week later. For this gig, the Minus 5 was just McCaughey fronting Wilco, with frontman Jeff Tweedy playing bass. The group raced through a handful of brand-new, unrehearsed songs alongside covers of influences as diverse as Mott The Hoople, Johnny Cash and Neutral Milk Hotel.

A few weeks later (January 20) a more conventional Minus 5 lineup (McCaughey, Buck, Ramberg, Chris Ballew and R.E.M. session drummer Bill Rieflin) premiered eight of these new songs at the Crocodile Cafe back in Seattle. John Wesley Harding and Kurt Bloch sat in on a few numbers.

On March 13, 2000, McCaughey assembled a skeleton crew of himself, Buck, Ramberg and R.E.M. session drummer Bill Rieflin at Jupiter Studios in Seattle and recorded ten of his latest compositions in one day. The session included spirited takes on the Nightcrawlers' power-pop anthem "The Little Black Egg", an ode to the demise of the Lounge Ax ("The Night Chicago Died (The Death of The Minus 5)") and even a tribute to Dr. Evil, the villain in the Austin Powers film series.

On April 25, 2000, The Minus 5 played another Croc show with a lineup of McCaughey, Buck, Stringfellow, Ramberg and Barrett Martin. John Wesley Harding, Sean Nelson and The Long Winters' John Roderick sat in on the set, which included Bee Gees, Wings and Rolling Stones covers. The Minus 5 returned to the Croc on June 8 with McCaughey, Buck, Ramberg, Rieflin and John Wesley Harding playing a set which included some improvised one-off songs, Faces and Paul McCartney covers.

Despite a rigorous recording schedule for R.E.M. with sessions in Georgia and Dublin, Ireland, Buck was nonetheless available for Minus 5 gigs on July 7 at Tractor Tavern at September 2 at Bumbershoot Festival at Memorial Stadium. The Minus 5 were a last-minute replacement for a band that dropped out of the fest and for this show consisted of McCaughey, Buck, Ramberg, John Wesley Harding, Robert Lloyd (of Harding's band) and members of the Walkabouts.

McCaughey pressed 1,000 copies of the March session as a surprise album, titled In Rock. Because it was made as a limited-edition, tour-only CD McCaughey released it on his Book label. The CD was only available at Minus 5 shows at first, though it was later sold through the R.E.M. fanclub. The CD was sold for the first time at an October 14, 2000 Crocodile Cafe show with McCaughey, Buck, Stringfellow, Ramberg and Rieflin. A Sonics cover band (The New Original Sonic Sound) featuring members of Mudhoney, Tuatara, and Gas Huffer with McCaughey on keyboards also played.

In October 2000, McCaughey and Stringfellow returned to Georgia to record with R.E.M. During the sessions, McCaughey, Stringfellow and Mike Mills joined local group The Possibilities for a loose set that included Neil Young, Bob Dylan, Chris Bell, Joni Mitchell and Gram Parsons covers. The Minus 5's cover of the band's "You Don't Mean It" would be released as a radio single just a few months later.

The Minus 5 closed out an eventful year with a Croc set on December 8, 2000, with the lineup of McCaughey, Buck, Ramberg, and Rieflin with guests John Wesley Harding, Sean Nelson, Britt Speakman, Carla Tongerson and Peter Blackstock. A number of new songs were debuted at this show including "A Thousand Years Away" and "You Don't Mean It."

=== Let the War Against Music Begin ===
In 2001, the Minus Five and the Young Fresh Fellows, another McCaughey project, released a split double album, Let the War Against Music Begin/Because We Hate You; the "Let the War Against Music Begin" half was the Minus 5 submission.

After a change of guard at Hollywood Records, the Minus 5 found themselves releasing music via independent channels, with the Return to Sender label releasing a collection of outtakes from Let the War Against Music Begin called I Don't Know Who I Am before McCaughey signed the band to the Yep Roc label for his collaboration with Wilco, Down With Wilco. Yep Roc later issued an EP dominated by Down With Wilco outtakes, At the Organ, and reissued In Rock, a collection of tunes McCaughey recorded in a single day in 2000.

In 2002, the band contributed a track, "Girl I Never Met" to Rami Jaffee, Pete Yorn, and Marc Dauer's Trampoline Records release: Trampoline Records Volume I.

The band's seventh album, self-titled The Minus 5 (but known as The Gun Album), was released early 2006, and features, along the regular line-up, guest appearances by Wilco, Kelly Hogan and The Decemberists' singer/songwriter Colin Meloy, among others.

Buck and McCaughey went on to play in The Baseball Project together in 2008.

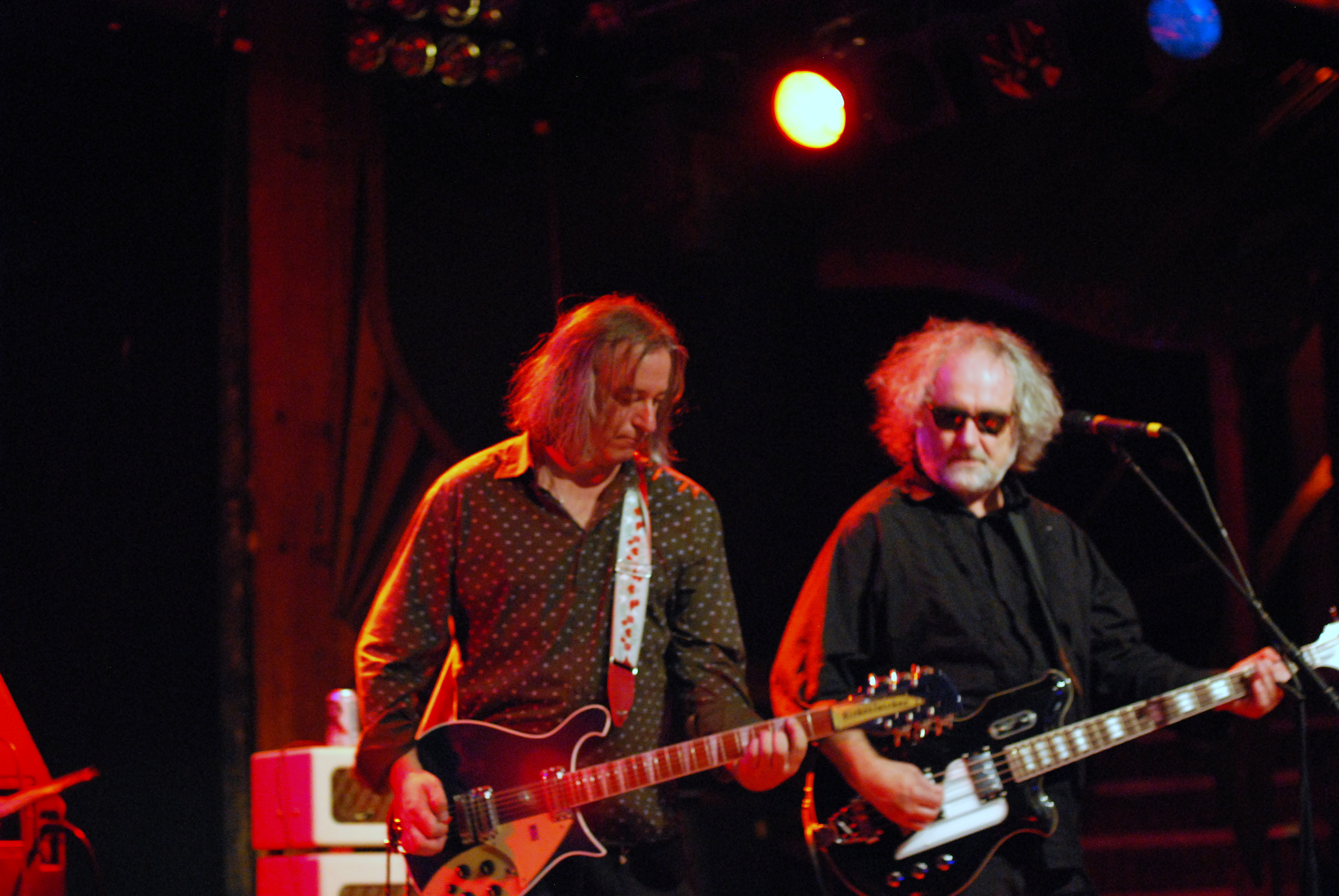
Buck and McCaughey playing with The Baseball Project/The Minus 5/Steve Wynn IV in 2009

The Minus 5 appeared on John Wesley Harding's 2009 release, Who Was Changed and Who Was Dead and released Killingsworth later that year.

In 2012, recorded a version of the 1976 hit single by the Sutherland Brothers and Quiver "Arms of Mary" for a fund raising CD titled "Super Hits Of The Seventies" for radio station WFMU. The band played at SXSW in 2013.

In January 2017, The Minus 5 joined Alejandro Escovedo for a short tour. For each concert, Scott McCaughey, Kurt Bloch, Peter Buck, and John Moen played one set as the Minus Five, and then a second set backing Escovedo, sometimes with Kelly Hogan, too. All of them had also performed on Escovedo's 2016 album Burn Something Beautiful, for which Escovedo, McCaughey, and Buck co-wrote the songs.

=== Oar On, Penelope! and tour ===
The Minus 5 released its sixteenth studio album, Oar On, Penelope!, on May 30, 2025, via Yep Roc Records. For this album, McCaughey, Buck, and drummer Linda Pitmon were joined by Kurt Block (lead guitar) and Debbi Peterson (vocals). The band then did a joint tour opening for The Baseball Project. with McCaughey, Buck, Pitmon, Pitmon's husband Steve Wynn, and Mike Mills (the members of The Baseball Project) performing both sets (with Buck on bass, Wynn on lead guitar, and Mills on keyboards for the Minus 5 songs).

== Discography ==
=== Singles & EPs ===
- The Minus Five – A Hello selection Dec.'93 – Jan.'94. (CD – Hello CD of the Month Club – 1993)
- The Emperor of the Bathroom (CD – East Side Digital – 1995)
- At the Organ (Yep Roc – 2004)
- Sad Hasselhoff (Vinyl limited 1000 copies – Yep Roc – 2008)

=== Albums ===
- Old Liquidator (East Side Digital – 1995)
- The Lonesome Death of Buck McCoy (Hollywood Records – 1997)
- In Rock (Book Records – 2000)
- Let the War Against Music Begin (Mammoth Records – 2001 – with Young Fresh Fellows)
- Down with Wilco (Yep Roc Records – 2003)
- I Don't Know Who I Am (Let the War Against Music Begin, Vol. 2) (Return to Sender – 2003)
- The Minus 5 (Yep Roc Records – 2006)
- Killingsworth (Yep Roc Records – 2009)
- Scott the Hoople in the Dungeon of Horror (Vinyl limited 750 copies –Yep Roc Records – 2014)
- Dungeon Golds (Yep Roc Records – 2015)
- Of Monkees and Men (Yep Roc Records – 2016)
- Alejandro Escovedo – Burn Something Beautiful (2016)
- Dear December (Yep Roc Records – 2017)
- Stroke Manor (Yep Roc Records – 2019)
- Calling Cortez (Yep Roc Records – 2023)
- Oar On, Penelope! (Yep Roc Records – 2025)

=== Compilations ===
- "Doodle" (by Skip Spence) More Oar: A Tribute to the Skip Spence Album (Birdman Records – 1999)
- "Sputnik 57" (by Jon Langford) – For A Decade of Sin: 11 Years of Bloodshot Records (Bloodshot Records – 2005)
- Butcher Covered (CD) (Limited Edition covers compilation – only available at shows) (Book Records – 2009)
- "St. Catherine's Statue" (by Jimmy Silva) THROUGH A FARAWAY WINDOW: A TRIBUTE TO JIMMY SILVA (SteadyBoy Records – 2010)

== Band members ==
=== Current members ===
- Scott McCaughey – vocals, guitar (1993–present)
- Peter Buck – bass (1993–present)
- Debbi Peterson - keyboard, vocals (2025–present)
- Linda Pitmon - drums, vocals (2015–present)
- Luke Haines - guitar (2025–present)
- Nick Fowler - keyboards (2025–present)

=== Former members ===
- Terry Adams – keyboard (1993–2002)
- Tom Ardolino – drums (1993–2002)
- Jon Auer – drums (1995–1996)
- Bill Rieflin – drums (2000–2003)
- Jeff Tweedy – keyboard (2002–2004)
- Glenn Kotche – drums (2003–2006)
- Ken Stringfellow – guitar (1993–1999)
- Ben Gibbard – guitar (1999–2006)
- Mike Coykendall – guitar (2006–2012)
- Casey Neill – guitar (2012–2015)
- Dave Depper – guitar (2015–2019)
- Colin Meloy – guitar (2004–?)
- John Moen – drums (2006–?)
- Steve Wynn – guitar (2019–?)
