= In Rock (The Minus 5 album) =

Studio album by The Minus 5
- Released: 2000
- Recorded: March 13, 2000; Re-release bonus track: November 10 and 20, 2003
- Studios: Jupiter Studio and Litho Studio, Portland, Oregon, United States
- Genre: Rock music
- Length: 29:31
- Labels: Book Records; Re-release: Yep Roc

The Minus 5 chronology
| My Chartreuse Opinion (1997) | In Rock (2000) | Let the War Against Music Begin (2001) |

In Rock is an album by American rock band The Minus 5. It was released in 2000 by Book Records, and re-released in 2004 by Yep Roc. The album was recorded over one day in 2000 with songs written impromptu by band leader Scott McCaughey and sold at concerts in a limited edition of 1,000. McCaughey decided that the album should see a wider distribution, so he approached Yep Roc because he had had pleasant experiences with releasing albums from them in the past; he recorded new songs for this edition.

== Critical reception ==
Professional ratings
Review scores
| Source | Rating |
|---|---|
| AllMusic | 4/5 stars |
| The Orlando Sentinel | 3/4 stars |
| Pitchfork | 7.6/10 |

The editorial staff of AllMusic Guide gave this album four out of five stars, with reviewer Mark Deming calling it "pretty darned satisfying" due to McCaughey's clever songwriting, calling the album "both tight and loose just when it needs to be". Dennis Tyhacz of PopMatters echoes the catchy songwriting, writing that McCaughey's "gift for melody is a breath of fresh air". Joe Tangari of Pitchfork gave the release a 7.6 out of 10, writing that this album contains some of McCaughey's best work in his 15-year career, characterizing the album as "a hugely welcome blast of pure pop mayhem from one of its finest practitioners", writing "most of these songs are short and to the point, laced with McCaughey's trademark wit and served with a short stack of harmony vocals and a lot of fuzzy guitar" In Exclaim!, Vish Khanna considers In Rock an "inspired, loose (though not as loose as one might suspect) collection of songs that contribute to the band's fun-filled reputation". Writing for The Orlando Sentinel, Jim Abbott gave the album three out of four stars for its 1960s pop rock influences and the exuberance of the vintage sound.

== Track listing ==
All songs written by Scott McCaughey, except where noted

1. "Dear My Inspiration" – 2:04
2. "Over the Sea" – 3:41
3. "Courage Is the Smallest Bird" – 2:27
4. "The Night Chicago Died (The Death of The Minus 5)" – 3:59
5. "The Girl I Never Met" (Peter Buck and McCaughey) – 2:47
6. "In a Lonely Coffin" – 1:44
7. "The Little Black Egg" (Chuck Conlon) – 2:46
8. "Lies of the Living Dead" – 2:32
9. "Dr. Evil: Doctor of Evil" (Buck and McCaughey) – 3:36
10. "Myrna Loy (#2)" (Buck and McCaughey) – 3:50

Re-release CD track listing

1. "Bambi Molester" (Scott McCaughey, John Ramberg and Bill Rieflin) – 1:29
2. "Dear My Inspiration" – 2:03
3. "In a Lonely Coffin" – 1:42
4. "The Forgotten Fridays" – 3:45
5. "Courage Is the Smallest Bird" – 2:24
6. "The Girl I Never Met" (Buck and McCaughey) – 2:45
7. "The Night Chicago Died Again" – 3:55
8. "Where the Wires Meet the Skies" – 3:03
9. "Lies of the Living Dead" – 2:30
10. "Dr. Evil: Doctor of Evil" (Buck and McCaughey) – 3:31
11. "Cosmic Jive" – 4:28
12. "Over the Sea" – 3:47

Re-release vinyl track listing

1. "Bambi Molester" (McCaughey, Ramberg and Rieflin) – 1:29
2. "Where the Wires Meet the Skies" – 3:03
3. "In a Lonely Coffin" – 1:42
4. "The Forgotten Fridays" – 3:45
5. "The Girl I Never Met" (Buck and McCaughey) – 2:45
6. "Cosmic Jive" – 4:28
7. "The Night Chicago Died Again" – 3:55
8. "Dear My Inspiration" – 2:03
9. "Courage Is the Smallest Bird" – 2:24
10. "Lies of the Living Dead" – 2:30
11. "The Little Black Egg" (Conlon) – 2:46
12. "Dr. Evil: Doctor of Evil" (Buck and McCaughey) – 3:31
13. "Over the Sea" – 3:47
14. "Myrna Loy (#2)" (Buck and McCaughey) – 3:50

== Personnel ==
The Minus 5

- Peter Buck – guitar
- Scott McCaughey – guitar, vocals, recording; mixing, production on all tracks except "Little Black Egg"
- John Ramberg – bass guitar
- Bill Rieflin – drums

Additional personnel

- Chris Ballew – guitar, vocals
- Kurt Bloch – guitar, vocals, recording, mixing, production on "Bambi Molester", "Where the Wires Meet the Skies", "In a Lonely Coffin", and "Cosmic Jive"
- Jon Ervie – assistant engineering
- Martin Feveyear – production
- Ben Gibbard – guitar, vocals
- John Wesley Harding – guitar, vocals
- Floyd Rietsma – assistant engineering
- "Hoss" Singleton
- Troy Tietjen – assistant engineering
