= PopLlama Records =

American record label

- Founded: 1984
- Founder: Conrad Uno
- Genre: Alternative rock, grunge, hardcore punk, indie rock
- Country of origin: U.S.
- Location: Seattle, Washington
- Official website: https://sites.google.com/view/popllama/home

PopLlama Records is an independent record label founded by record producer Conrad Uno in Seattle, Washington, in 1984. After making several of his own demos in his basement studio, Uno would produce The Young Fresh Fellows' debut album The Fabulous Sounds of the Pacific Northwest at the band's request. When the band decided to release their own albums, Uno founded PopLlama Records to help, releasing their debut album as well as the follow-up Topsy Turvy. Uno would continue to produce, usually for friends, and release albums through PopLlama throughout the 1980s.

PopLlama has been credited as the "label [that] helped start the Seattle scene", along with other Pacific Northwest labels such as C/Z Records, Regal Select Records, Estrus Records and EMpTy Records, due to the release of albums by the Young Fresh Fellows and The Posies in the 1980s. The label has also released albums by groups such as Dharma Bums, Nevada Bachelors, the Presidents of the United States of America, the Squirrels and the Smugglers among others.

== Roster ==
- Capping Day
- Dharma Bums
- Fastbacks
- Girl Trouble
- Jimmy Silva
- Nevada Bachelors
- The Pickets
- PK Dwyer
- The Posies
- The Presidents of the United States of America
- Pure Joy
- Rally Go!
- Red Dress
- Richard Peterson
- The Smugglers
- The Squirrels
- The Walkabouts
- The Young Fresh Fellows

== See also ==
- List of record labels
