= Mike Mills =

American musician (born 1958)

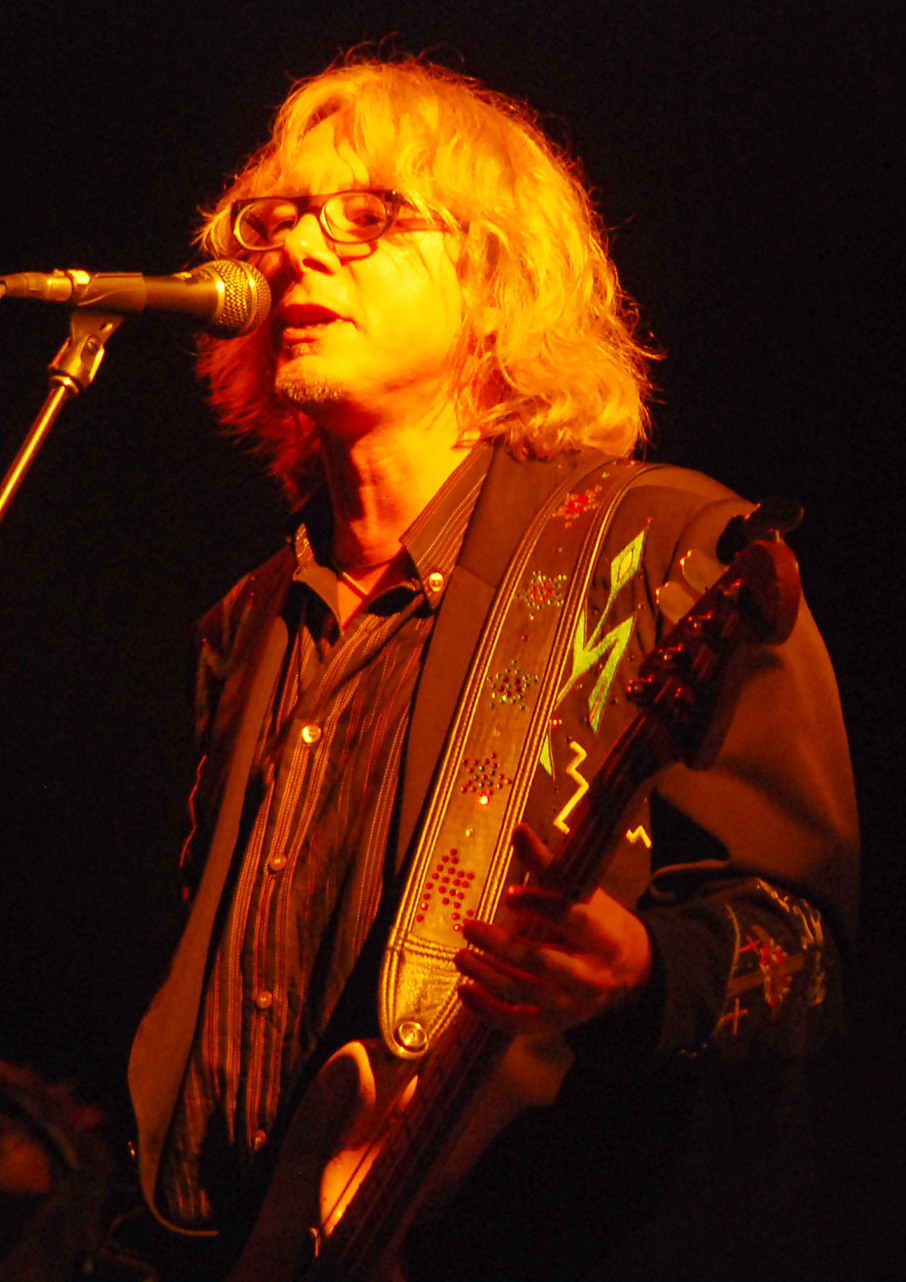
- Mills in 2008

Background information
- Born: Michael Edward Mills; December 17, 1958 (age 67); Orange County, California, U.S.
- Genres: Alternative rock, folk rock, college rock, jangle pop
- Occupations: Musician, composer, music producer
- Instruments: Bass guitar, keyboards, vocals
- Years active: 1978–present
- Formerly of: R.E.M.
- Spouse: Jasmine Pahl

Michael Edward Mills (born December 17, 1958) is an American multi-instrumentalist, singer, and composer who was a founding member of the alternative rock band R.E.M. Though known primarily as the bass guitarist and backing vocalist of R.E.M., his musical repertoire also includes keyboards and occasional lead vocals. He contributed to a majority of the band's musical compositions and is the only member to have had formal musical training.

== Early life ==
Michael Edward Mills was born to Frank and Adora Mills in Orange County, California, where his father was stationed in the Marines. While his father was away, six-month-old Mills, with his mother and grandmother, moved to Atlanta, Georgia, where he lived for around ten years. The family moved to Macon, Georgia, in 1971. It was there that Mills met future R.E.M. bandmate Bill Berry when they attended high school. The duo started out in bands together. Early projects included the band Shadowfax, later called The Back Door Band. Berry kept his drum kit in the basement of Mills's parents' house, and Mills dabbled with it. Mills explained: "We had a turntable next to it, so I'd put on...I only had three records at that point. I had A Night at the Opera by Queen, Tres Hombres by ZZ Top, and I don't remember the third one." At high school, he began playing bass because he enjoyed experiencing the wooden bleachers vibrating from the sound of the bass in the school's jazz band. He borrowed two bass guitars from his mother's chiropractor, one being a Fender and the other a Gibson EB-2. After giving those back, he used the school's jazz bass for a long time. He played in the school's jazz band, which meant (per the school's rules) that he also had to play in the school's classical band and their marching band.

Records Mills regularly listened to during high school include Suitable for Framing by Three Dog Night (his favorite band for a long time), Summer Breeze by Seals and Crofts and You Don't Mess Around with Jim by Jim Croce. Via his transistor radio, he listened to WNEX-FM, the only top-40 station available in Macon. "Loved it. I listened to everything because they would play everything. You'd get Motown, you'd get the Beach Boys, you'd get British Invasion." Being in the American South, he was also exposed to white gospel music on Sunday-morning television's Southern Gospel Jubilee. "You'd get the white gospel, and you could find some black gospel. Country music was everywhere. My parents were into classical music, and my dad was into jazz. So I was just surrounded by everything." Mills's mother played acoustic guitar.

Mills and Berry sold most of their musical equipment and moved to Athens, Georgia, together. Upon arriving, they bought their equipment back, having been turned on to punk music by Ian Copeland, who Berry worked with at Paragon Booking Agency in Macon. Mills attended the University of Georgia, where R.E.M. was formed.

== Career ==
Mills is credited with being the chief composer behind many of R.E.M.'s songs, including "Nightswimming", "Find the River", "At My Most Beautiful", "Why Not Smile", "Let Me In", "Wendell Gee", "(Don't Go Back To) Rockville", "Beat a Drum", "Be Mine", "Electrolite", and "What's the Frequency, Kenneth?" In particular, R.E.M.'s 2004 album Around the Sun was heavily shaped by Mills' piano and keyboard contributions.

Mills is responsible for the prominent backing vocal and harmony parts found in the band's back catalog, with his vocal contributions being most noticeable on 1986's Lifes Rich Pageant and 2008's Accelerate. He sang lead vocals on the songs "Texarkana", "Near Wild Heaven", The Clique cover "Superman" and The Troggs cover "Love Is All Around".

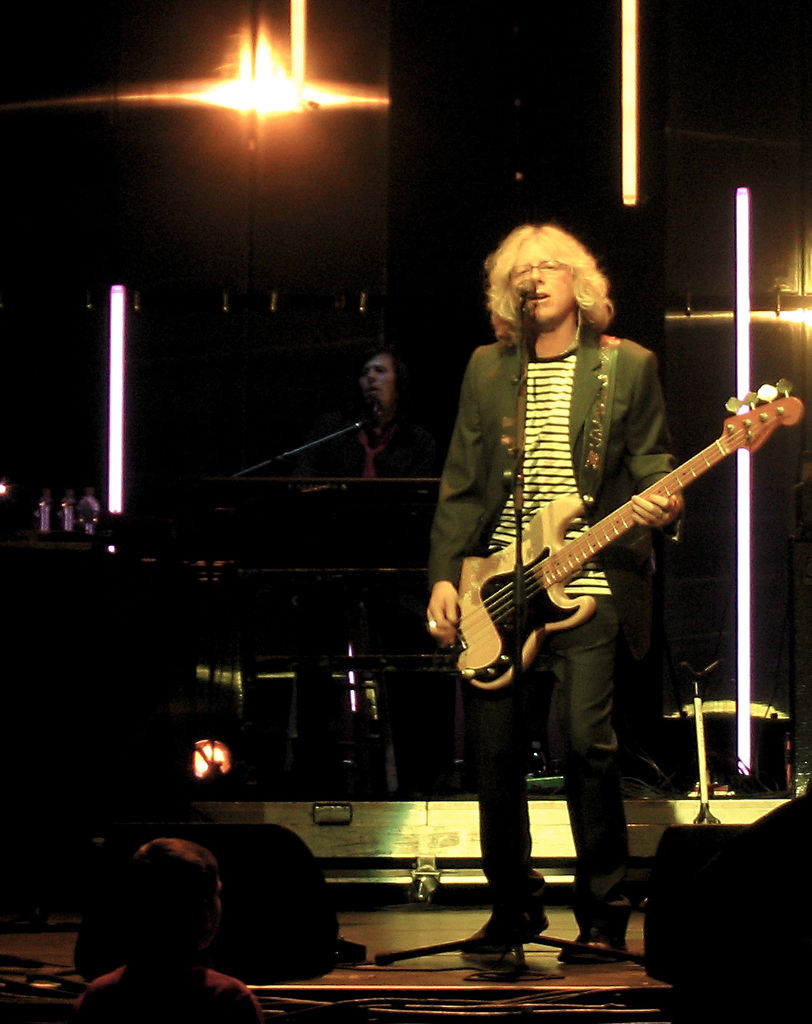
Mills performing in 2004

Mills has written and performed with friends on various projects during his time with the band and since. In 1990 he wrote music for Howard Libov's short film Men Will Be Boys. That same year, he recorded with Warren Zevon together with Buck and Berry as the Hindu Love Gods.

In 2012, Mills contributed piano to a Record Store Day single released by Drive-By Truckers member Patterson Hood, in protest of a Walmart development being built in Athens, Georgia.

Mills is a member, along with Steve Wynn, Scott McCaughey, Peter Buck, and Linda Pitmon, of The Baseball Project.

Mills performs as part of singer-songwriter Joseph Arthur's band. On April 3, 2014, while performing with Arthur, Mills broke the news that David Letterman would be retiring in 2015. Nine years later, Mills said: "I spoke to Dave about it later and he said, 'No, it was fine. If somebody was going to do it, I'd rather it be you.' And I said, 'Well, thank you.' It was quite a moment to hear him say that sitting there in the dressing room." Mills took a band self-portrait that he posted to Instagram and did a short interview about "breaking" the story.

Since 2010, Mills has played with a rotating group of musicians for a series of concerts built around Big Star's album Third/Sister Lovers. Known as Big Star's Third, the concerts have taken place in London, Sydney, Chicago, Seattle, Los Angeles, and New York. A longtime Big Star fan, Mills wrote the liner notes for the 2014 reissue of the band's first two releases, 1972's #1 Record and 1974's Radio City.

In 2016, he toured to support a Concerto for Violin, Rock Band, and String Orchestra with childhood friend Robert McDuffie, along with guitar players William Tonks and John Neff. The tour resumed in 2022.

In 2023, a mushroom species of the genus Pluteus, Pluteus millsii was named in his honor.

In 2025, Mills, Darius Rucker, and Steve Gorman of the Black Crowes formed a supergroup called Howl Owl Howl, releasing the single "My Cologne." Howl Owl Howl first appeared in 2019 at a benefit concert in Nashville. The group was still making appearances as of 2025.

== Musical style ==
Mills' melodic approach to bass playing is inspired by Paul McCartney of the Beatles and Chris Squire of Yes; Mills has said, "I always played a melodic bass, like a piano bass in some ways ... I never wanted to play the traditional locked into the kick drum, root note bass work." Mills has more musical training than his bandmates, which he has said "made it easier to turn abstract musical ideas into reality." He began taking piano lessons at age 14.

During R.E.M.'s career, Mills often harmonized with Michael Stipe in songs; in the chorus for "Stand", Mills and Stipe alternate singing lyrics, creating a dialogue. "My voice is the culmination of a lifetime of enjoying harmony," Mills explained in 2023. "When I was a kid singing in the church choir, I was always finding harmony. I usually got the tenor part. I grew up around music. There was always music in the house. So when R.E.M. started playing, I sang. Our approach was that my voice and Michael's voice were extra instruments. It wasn't about a lead vocal and a backing vocal and a harmony vocal. It was just more melody and more instrumentation to add to the mix."

=== Equipment ===
Regarding his best bass sound in R.E.M.'s catalog, Mills said: "I'm not a gearhead, and I don't always think about it in those terms. The Rick I had for the first couple of records was cool; it sounded alright. The trouble with the Rick was that when the pickups went out, the replacement pickups sucked. Rickenbacker's replacement pickups all sucked, so I had to quit playing their bass. I went through this series of Ibanez and various different things. I ended up with a Guild Pilot for the '89 tour. Which sounded fine; it was cool. It might even be on [Green]; I can't remember. I finally broke down. I didn't want to play a [Fender Precision] bass because everybody played one, but then I thought, 'There's a reason everybody plays one.' They're the best basses, especially for bigger halls."

== Discography ==
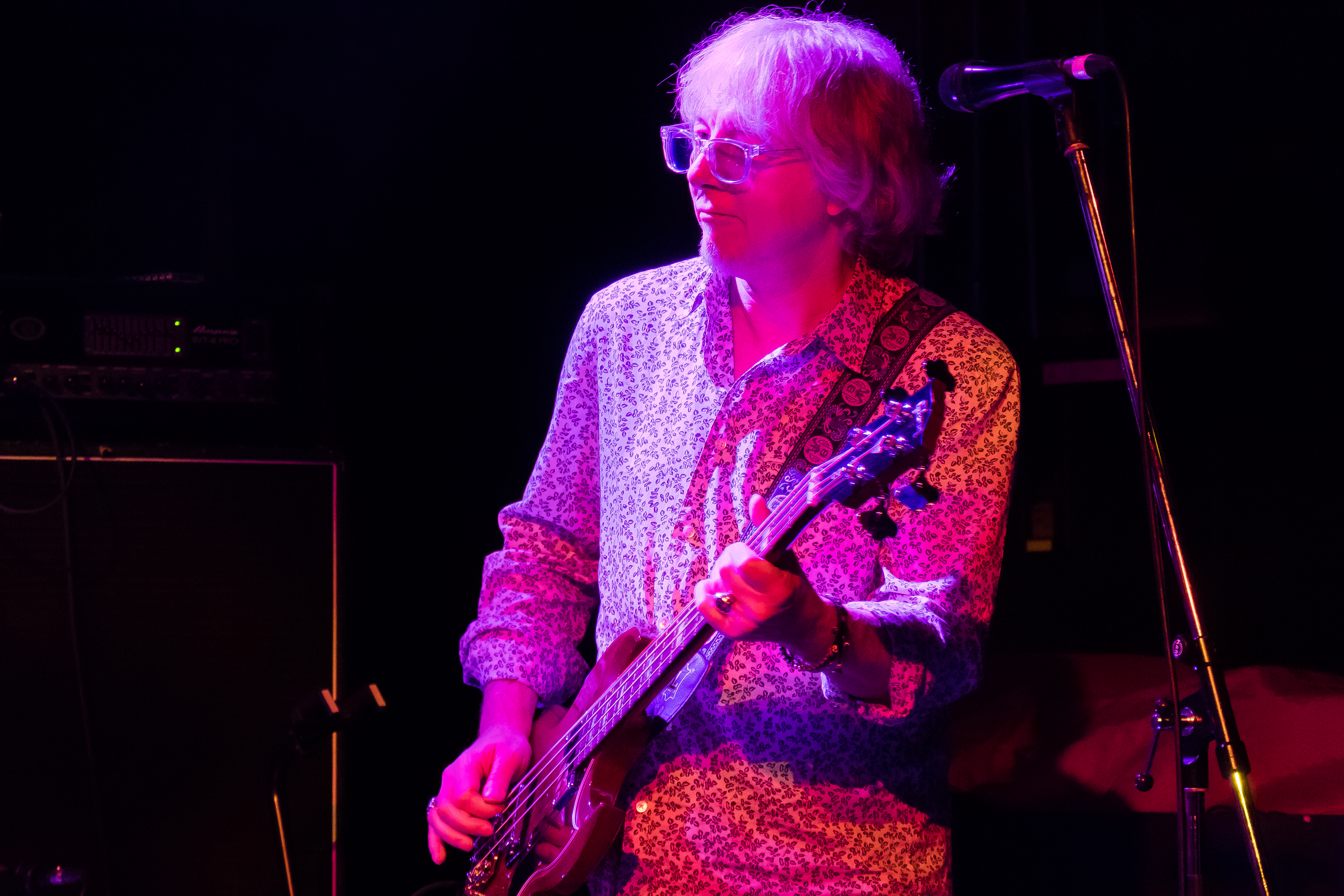
Mills, 2017

- 1984 – Hindu Love Gods – "Gonna Have a Good Time Tonight"/"Narrator".
- 1985 – Full Time Men– Full Time Men, organ on "One More Time"
- 1987 – Warren Zevon – Sentimental Hygiene on "Sentimental Hygiene", "Boom Boom Mancini", "The Factory", "Trouble Waiting to Happen", "Detox Mansion", "Bad Karma", "Even a Dog Can Shake Hands", and "The Heartache"
- 1987 – Waxing Poetics– Hermitage, production
- 1988 – Billy James – Sixes and Sevens, production
- 1988 – The Cynics –"Roadrunner" (live)
- 1989 – Indigo Girls – Indigo Girls, bass guitar on "Tried to Be True"
- 1989 – Vibrating Egg – Come On in Here If You Want To, writing and performance
- 1990 – Kevn Kinney – MacDougal Blues
- 1990 – Hindu Love Gods – Hindu Love Gods
- 1990 – Hindu Love Gods – "Raspberry Beret"
- 1991 – Nikki Sudden – The Jewel Thief
- 1991 – Nikki Sudden – "I Belong to You"
- 1991 – Robbie Robertson – Storyville, singing on "Shake This Town"
- 1992 – The Troggs – Athens, Andover
- 1992 – Jane Pratt Show theme music
- 1993 – Automatic Baby – "One"
- 1993 – The Smashing Pumpkins – Siamese Dream, piano on "Soma"
- 1993 – Three Walls Down – Building Our House, production
- 1993 – Three Walls Down – "Steps"/"Wooden Nails"/"Faith in These Times" (live)
- 1994 – Backbeat soundtrack
- 1994 – Victoria Williams – Loose, vocals on "You R Loved"
- 2000 – Christy McWilson – The Lucky One
- 2006 – Various artists – Big Star, Small World, bass guitar on "The Ballad of El Goodo", with Matthew Sweet
- 2006 – Mike Mills and Sally Ellyson – "Jesus Christ", a Big Star song covered for a charity single for the Red Apple Foundation
- 2007 – Mudville – Iris Nova, piano on "Eternity"
- 2008 – Modern Skirts – All of Us in Our Night, production on "Motorcade"
- 2008 – The Baseball Project – Volume 1: Frozen Ropes and Dying Quails
- 2009 – Favorite Son soundtrack – "Gift of the Fathers"
- 2009 – Jill Hennessy – Ghost in My Head, backing vocals on "Erin"
- 2009 – The Baseball Project – Homerun EP
- 2010 – Various artists – The Voice Project, cover of Billy Bragg's "Sing Their Souls Back Home"
- 2011 – The Baseball Project – Volume 2: High and Inside
- 2011 – The Baseball Project – The Broadside Ballads
- 2012 – Jason Ringenberg – Nature Jams – vocals on one track
- 2012 – Patterson Hood & The Downtown 13 – "After It's Gone"/"Unspoken Pretties" – performance on A-side, single released for Record Store Day
- 2014 – The Baseball Project – 3rd
- 2016 – Mike Mills – Concerto for Violin, Rock Band, and String Orchestra
- 2022 – Superchunk - Wild Loneliness, vocal on "On the Floor"
- 2022 – Drive-By Truckers - Welcome 2 Club XIII
- 2023 – The Baseball Project – Grand Salami Time!
- 2024 – Johnny Irion – Sleeping Soldiers of Love

== Personal life ==
Mills is an avid fantasy sports player, with interest in NFL, NBA, and PGA teams, among others. He is also a fan of his alma mater's football team, the Georgia Bulldogs.

He is married to Jasmine Pahl, and has an adult son from a previous relationship. He is an atheist.
