= The Broadside Ballads =

Studio album by The Baseball Project
- Released: 2011
- Length: 46:49
- Language: English
- Label: Book

The Baseball Project chronology
Volume 2: High and Inside (2011)	The Broadside Ballads (2011)	3rd (2014)

The Broadside Ballads (2011) is an album from The Baseball Project, bringing together songs that were recorded as ‘real time’ commentary on the 2010 baseball season for ESPN.com with unreleased extra tracks from Volume 1: Frozen Ropes and Dying Quails and Volume 2: High and Inside. The nine tracks prepared for ESPN.com are also available online (in a different sequence) for free streaming.

== Track listing ==
1. "All Future and No Past" – 2:33
2. "Cubs 2010" – 2:59
3. "30 Doc" – 3:06
4. "Lima Time!" – 2:13
5. "Phenom" – 3:04
6. "(Do The) Triple Crown" – 3:06
7. "DL Blues" – 3:06
8. "The Way It's Gonna Be" – 2:45
9. "The Giants Win the Pennant" – 3:18
10. "Blood Diamond" – 2:59
11. "Golden Sombrero" – 2:16
12. "The Ballad of Mike Kekich and Fritz Peterson" – 2:33
13. "Dizzy Dean – 2:57
14. "El Hombre" – 4:05
15. "The Magic Mitt of Jason Byles" – 1:51
16. "Show Up to Work Every Day" – 3:58

== Personnel ==
The Baseball Project

- Peter Buck – guitar
- Scott McCaughey – bass guitar
- Linda Pitmon – drums
- Steve Wynn – vocals

Guests

- Robert Lloyd – accordion, mandolin, organ
- John "Perhapst" Moen – backing vocals
- John Ramberg – guitar

Section reference:
