= 3rd (The Baseball Project album) =

Studio album by The Baseball Project
- Released: March 25, 2014
- Recorded: Type Foundry Studio, Portland, Oregon, United States
- Genre: Indie rock
- Length: 61:33
- Label: Yep Roc Records
- Producers: The Baseball Project and Adam Selzer

The Baseball Project chronology
The Broadside Ballads (2011)	3rd (2014)	Grand Salami Time (2023)

3rd is the third album by American indie rock supergroup the Baseball Project. It was released on March 25, 2014, on Yep Roc Records.

== Reviews ==
Professional ratings
Aggregate scores
Source	Rating
Metacritic	77%
Review scores
Source	Rating
AllMusic	4/5 stars
Robert Christgau	A−
Lincoln Journal Star	B+
PopMatters	8/10

3rd has received positive reviews from critics. Review aggregator site Metacritic has given it a 77%, indicating "generally favorable reviews".

== Track listing ==
1. "Stats" (Wynn) – 1:39
2. "From Nails to Thumbtacks" (McCaughey) – 2:56
3. "¡Hola America!" (Wynn) – 3:56
4. "13" (Wynn) – 4:08
5. "The Day Dock Went Hunting Heads" (McCaughey) – 4:35
6. "To the Veterans Committee" (Mills) – 2:19
7. "Monument Park" (Wynn) – 4:28
8. "Box Scores" (McCaughey) – 4:05
9. "They Don't Know Henry" (McCaughey) – 3:30
10. "The Babe" (McCaughey) – 3:38
11. "They Are the Oakland A's" (McCaughey) – 3:14
12. "Pascual on the Perimeter" (Wynn) – 3:33
13. "The Baseball Card Song" (Wynn) – 3:18
14. "Extra Inning of Love" (McCaughey) – 4:17
15. "Larry Yount" (Wynn) – 3:42
16. "A Boy Named Cy" (Wynn) – 2:27
17. "They Played Baseball" (McCaughey) – 4:53
18. "Take Me Out to the Ball Game" (Norworth/Von Tilzer, public domain, arr. McCaughey/Wynn/Pitmon) – 1:04

Bonus tracks from YepRoc.com

19. "C'mon Prince (Stay in Milwaukee)" – 2:52
20. "I Shan't Be Back" – 2:36
21. "Spring Training in New Orleans" – 3:32
22. "Why Melky Why" – 2:19

== Personnel ==
The Baseball Project

- Scott McCaughey – vocals, guitars, keyboards, bass, percussion
- Steve Wynn – vocals, guitars
- Linda Pitmon – drums, percussion, piano, vocals
- Peter Buck – 12 and 6 string guitars, Fender VI bass, banjo
- Mike Mills – bass, vocals

Guests

- Josh Kantor – piano and organ (7); Panda organ
- Alex Gonzalez (Escoba) – trumpet (3, 4)

Production Produced by The Baseball Project and Adam Selzer.
Recorded by Adam Selzer at Type Foundry, Portland OR.
Additional recording by:

- Scott McCaughey (Dungeon Of Horror, Portland)
- John Keane (John Keane Studios, Athens GA)
- David Barbe (Chase Transduction, Athens)
- David Westner (Woolly Mammoth, Waltham MA)
- Gabriel Lopez at T-Vox Records (Mexico City, Mexico)

Mixed by:

- Mitch Easter (Fidelitorium Studios, Kernersville, NC)
- Sam Bell (Large Portions, L.A.)
- Scott McCaughey (Dungeon Of Horror, Portland)

Mastered by Greg Calbi at Sterling Sound NYC
