= Grand Salami Time! =

Studio album by the Baseball Project
- Released: June 30, 2023
- Recorded: 2022
- Studio: Fidelitorium Recordings, Kernersville, North Carolina, US
- Genre: Garage rock; power pop
- Length: 53:47
- Label: Omnivore
- Producer: The Baseball Project; Mitch Easter

The Baseball Project chronology
3rd (2014)	Grand Salami Time! (2023)

I always want to work with Mitch Easter whenever possible. He can work with any style of music, but he's great with rock and roll and pop music, and that's one of the things that we like to do as individuals and as a band. And we love Mitch as a person, as a collaborator, as a producer. He's excellent for all those things, and he's great to be around. So it's a no brainer. If Mitch has time and we can coordinate our schedules, then there's no reason not to work with Mitch.

—Mike Mills on reconnecting with Mitch Easter for Grand Salami Time!

I wrote the song "That's Living" the day after the sad death of José Fernández, who pitched for the Marlins. I just was so emotionally beat up about it when I heard the news about the guy. It could be just a story about a pitcher who died in a boating accident and had a great future. But the point of the song is that we all take chances, that's what life is all about, and we also tend to want to find some way to say, terribly, well, he had it coming, it couldn't have happened to me because I don't do that sort of thing. These are all things I'm putting in a song on a record where we're cracking jokes about screwballs and curveballs and things like that. Somehow, we have the freedom in this band to do that.

—Steve Wynn on songwriting for this album

Grand Salami Time! is the fourth full-length studio album by American rock supergroup the Baseball Project, released by Omnivore Recordings on June 30, 2023. The album was produced by Mitch Easter, who began working with R.E.M. at the beginning of their careers; the Baseball Project features two of their former members. It also marks their first album under Omnivore, as they had previously been signed to Yep Roc.

== Recording and release ==
At the urging of drummer Linda Pitmon, the band recorded this album with Mitch Easter, who had previously produced R.E.M.'s first single and co-produced that band's debut EP, debut full-length, and sophomore full-length. The sessions lasted 10 days and the songs were recorded live-to-tape in Easter's studio. The album was preceded by singles "The Voice of Baseball" (written in tribute to the late baseball announcer Vin Scully) and "Journeyman". The band also announced a brief tour of the United States supporting Jason Isbell & The 400 Unit. The album is titled after a line that Seattle Mariners announcer Dave Niehaus would say when a grand slam was hit.

== Reception ==
In American Songwriter, Lee Zimmerman rated this album 4 out of 5 stars, calling it "a joyful and jubilant example of the late '70s and early '80s power pop". Steven Wine of the Associated Press praised the clever lyrics and writes that "topics are paired with garage rock that gives [guitarist Peter] Buck a chance to serve up some delightful guitar squall". BrooklynVegan's Bill Pearis recommends the album to baseball fans and non-fans alike, noting that the former will get more enjoyment out of the music. Writing it for Glide Magazine, Jim Hynes calls this album "so much fun" and tells listeners that it's "pure joy putting the album on and following the lyrics in the jacket". In The Mercury News, Jim Harrington the band has "passion [that] leads to an abundance of ideas for song topics" and after multiple albums, they are "still going strong, finding plenty of musical inspiration in a seemingly endless supply of decades-old stories and modern-day tales about the game". Mario Naves of The New York Sun favorably compares this to the band's previous album, 3rd and calls it "unstoppable". Frank Valish of Under the Radar rated this work a 7 out of 10, writing that the live in-studio recording method "lends a certain energy to the proceedings" and characterizes the album as "a bunch of musical heroes having fun together and celebrating music, each other, and America's favorite pastime to boot".

== Track listing ==
1. "Grand Salami Time" (Peter Buck and Scott McCaughey) – 3:22
2. "The Yips" (Steve Wynn) – 3:31
3. "Screwball" (McCaughey) – 3:44
4. "Uncle Charlie" (Buck and Wynn) – 3:26
5. "Journeyman" (Buck and Wynn) – 4:07
6. "Erasable Man" (McCaughey) – 4:06
7. "New Oh in Town" (McCaughey) – 2:55
8. "Disco Demolition" (Wynn) – 3:28
9. "Stuff" (Mike Mills) – 5:21
10. "The All or Nothings" (Buck and McCaughey) – 2:57
11. "That's Living" (Wynn) – 3:28
12. "64 and 64" (McCaughey) – 4:39
13. "Having Fun" (Wynn) – 3:30
14. "Fantasy Baseball Widow" (Wynn) – 2:20
15. "The Voice of Baseball" (Buck and McCaughey) – 3:02

== Personnel ==
The Baseball Project

- Peter Buck – guitar, production
- Scott McCaughey – guitar, keyboards, lead vocals, backing vocals, production
- Mike Mills – bass guitar, backing vocals, lead vocals on "Stuff", production
- Linda Pitmon – drums, percussion, backing vocals, production
- Steve Wynn – guitar, lead vocals, backing vocals, production

Additional personnel

- Steve Berlin – baritone saxophone on "Erasable Man"
- Mitch Easter – guitar on "Journeyman", recording, mixing, production
- Stephen McCarthy – lap steel guitar

== See also ==
- 2023 in American music
- List of 2023 albums
