= Beat Poetry for Survivalists =

Studio album by Peter Buck & Luke Haines
- Released: 6 March 2020
- Length: 39:18
- Label: Cherry Red

Luke Haines chronology
I Sometimes Dream of Glue (2018)	Beat Poetry for Survivalists (2020)	Setting The Dogs on the Post-Punk Postman (2021)

Peter Buck chronology
Our Land (2017)	Beat Poetry for Survivalists (2020)	All The Kids Are Super Bummed Out (2022)

Beat Poetry for Survivalists is a 2020 collaborative studio album by R.E.M. co-founder Peter Buck and English musician Luke Haines. The combo included Scott McCaughey (co-writer as well as various guitars, vocals and keyboards) and Linda Pitmon (drums). It was released on March 6, 2020 under Cherry Red Records.

== Critical reception ==
Professional ratings
Aggregate scores
Source	Rating
AnyDecentMusic?	7.1/10
Metacritic	77/100
Review scores
Source	Rating
AllMusic	3.5/5 stars
American Songwriter	3/5 stars
The Irish Times	3/5 stars
MusicOMH	4/5 stars
Tom Hull – on the Web	B+

Beat Poetry for Survivalists was met with generally favorable reviews from critics. At Metacritic, which assigns a weighted average rating out of 100 to reviews from mainstream publications, this release received an average score of 77, based on 8 reviews.

== Track listing ==
Beat Poetry for Survivalists track listing
No.	Title	Length
1.	"Jack Parsons"	4:34
2.	"Apocalypse Beach"	4:36
3.	"Last of the Legendary Bigfoot Hunters"	4:12
4.	"Beat Poetry for the Survivalist"	4:29
5.	"Witch Tariff"	3:46
6.	"Andy Warhol Was Not Kind"	3:39
7.	"French Man Glam Gang"	3:49
8.	"Ugly Dude Blues"	3:36
9.	"Bobby's Wild Years"	3:43
10.	"Rock 'n' Roll Ambulance"	2:54

== Charts ==
Chart performance for Beat Poetry for Survivalists
Chart (2020)	Peak position
Scottish Albums (OCC)	88
