= Peter Buck (disambiguation) =

Peter Buck (born 1956) is an American musician, best known as the guitarist of R.E.M.

Peter Buck may also refer to:

- Peter Buck (album), a 2012 album by the musician
- Sir Peter Buck (mayor) (died 1625), mayor of Medway
- Peter Buck (restaurateur) (1930–2021), American physicist, restaurateur, and philanthropist, co-founder of Subway Sandwiches
- Sir Peter Buck (anthropologist) (1877–1951, also known as Te Rangi Hiroa), New Zealand Māori leader and academic
