= Hindu Love Gods =

Hindu Love Gods may refer to:

- Kamadeva and Rati
- Hindu Love Gods (band)
  - Hindu Love Gods (album), eponymous album of recorded music
