= All the Kids Are Super Bummed Out =

Studio album by Luke Haines, Peter Buck
- Released: 28 October 2022
- Genres: Rock; alternative rock
- Length: 67:39
- Label: Cherry Red

Luke Haines, Peter Buck chronology
Setting The Dogs on the Post-Punk Postman (2021)	All the Kids Are Super Bummed Out (2022)	Going Down To The River… To Blow My Mind (2025)

Peter Buck chronology
Beat Poetry for Survivalists (2020)	All The Kids Are Super Bummed Out (2022)	Going Down To The River… To Blow My Mind (2025)

All the Kids Are Super Bummed Out is a 2022 collaborative studio album by English musician Luke Haines and R.E.M. co-founder Peter Buck, and released on Cherry Red Records. It was their second collaborative album, following 2020's Beat Poetry for Survivalists. It was recorded during the COVID-19 lockdowns, and also featured Scott McCaughey and Linda Pitmon. Haines and Buck went on a joint tour in early 2023.

== Reception ==
Professional ratings
Aggregate scores
Source	Rating
Metacritic	78/100
Review scores
Source	Rating
God Is in the TV	9/10
PopMatters	8/10
Record Collector	4/5 stars
AllMusic	3.5/5 stars

The album was positively received, with Nick James, writing for God Is in the TV, noting that Haines' use of wry humour against the establishment.

== Track listing ==
All tracks are written by Luke Haines, Peter Buck, Scott McCaughey.

CD1
No.	Title	Length
1.	"The British Army on LSD"	4:11
2.	"The Skies Are Full of Insane Machines"	3:30
3.	"Sunstroke"	4:09
4.	"45 Revolutions"	5:07
5.	"Won't Even Get Out of Bed"	3:46
6.	"Psychedelic Sitar Casual"	4:11
7.	"Subterranean Earth Stomp"	3:30
8.	"The Commies Are Coming"	3:15
9.	"When I Met God"	4:53

All tracks are written by Luke Haines, Peter Buck, Scott McCaughey.

CD1
No.	Title	Length
1.	"Minimalist House Burns Down"	5:13
2.	"Exit Space (All the Kids Are Super Bummed Out)"	7:18
3.	"Iranian Embassy Siege"	3:15
4.	"You're My Kind of Guru"	3:26
5.	"Flying People"	2:33
6.	"Diary of a Crap Artist"	3:23
7.	"And We Will"	2:33
8.	"Waiting for the UFOs"	3:53
