= Games played =

Statistic used in team sports

Games played (GP) is a statistic used in team sports to indicate the total number of games in which a player has participated (in any capacity); the statistic is generally applied irrespective of whatever portion of the game is contested.

== Association football ==
In association football, a game played is counted if a player is in the starting 11, or if a reserve player enters the game before full-time.

== Baseball ==
In baseball, the statistic applies to players, who prior to a game, are included on a starting lineup card or are announced as an ex ante substitute, whether or not they play. For pitchers only, the statistic games pitched is used.

The career leader in Major League Baseball (MLB) games played is Pete Rose, who appeared in a total of 3,562 regular-season games.

The career leader in MLB games pitched is Jesse Orosco, who pitched in 1,252 regular-season games.

A notable example of the application of the ex ante rule is pitcher Larry Yount, who suffered an injury while throwing warmup pitches after being summoned as a reliever in a major-league game on September 15, 1971. He did not face a batter, but was credited with an appearance because he had been announced as a substitute. Yount never appeared in (or actually played in) any other MLB game.

== Basketball ==
In March 2026, LeBron James set a new National Basketball Association (NBA) record for most regular-season games played, with 1,612, surpassing the prior record holder, Robert Parish, who had played in 1,611 regular-season NBA games. A. C. Green holds the NBA record for most consecutive games played, with 1,192.

== See also ==
- Major League Baseball consecutive games played streaks
- List of NHL players with 500 consecutive games played
