= Big Star's Third =

- Genre: Rock
- Years active: 2010 to present
- Members: Jody Stephens; Mike Mills; Chris Stamey; Mitch Easter
- Website: www.bigstarthird.com

Big Star's Third refers to a series of tribute concerts built on Big Star's 1975 album Third/Sister Lovers. Regarded as a "lost masterpiece," and described as "the soundtrack to a nervous breakdown," the material from Third/Sister Lovers was first played live and fully orchestrated in December 2010, when two dozen musicians performed it at the Cat's Cradle in Carrboro, North Carolina. Since then, Big Star's Third concerts have taken place in the United States, the UK, and Australia. Although the performers rotate from show to show, a core group of musicians, including Jody Stephens, Big Star's original drummer, Mike Mills of R.E.M., Chris Stamey from The dB's, and Mitch Easter of Let's Active have been involved in the majority of the Big Star's Third shows.

== History ==
Big Star's Third began with Stamey, who had collaborated with Big Star's Alex Chilton in the late 70s. In 2005, working with Cat's Cradle owner Frank Heath, Stamey recruited a group of musicians for a performance of Elliot Smith's Either/Or. Several weeks later, Heath and Stamey discussed a performance of Third/Sister Lovers using a similar model. Stamey subsequently tracked down Carl Marsh, who had orchestrated Third/Sister Lovers. Marsh volunteered to write out the scores to replace the originals, which had been lost, but needed the original multitracked recordings of the album to do so. Five years later, at Heath's urging, Stamey spoke to John Fry at Ardent Studios, where Third/Sister Lovers was recorded. Fry agreed to make some of the original multitracks available so that the written music could be accurately rewritten, and the unwritten parts deciphered, and, after speaking to Stephens—who then managed Ardent Studios—Stamey planned a trip to discuss the project with the reconfigured Big Star, who were rehearsing for a SXSW performance. The night before the meeting, on March 17, 2010, Chilton died of a heart attack.

'Third' is an album of soft moonlight and deep black holes. It's the sound of confusion and dislocation. It's an album that sounds as if it was being demolished even as it was being recorded, where a heartstoppingly beautiful melody might at any moment be washed away by a scree of white noise. - The Guardian

With the support of Chilton's widow, Stephens, and Ardent, the plans for the Third/Sister Lovers concert moved forward. The inaugural performance of Big Star's Third took place on December 10 at the Cat's Cradle, with Stephens on drums, Mills on bass, and Easter and Stamey on guitar. Additional musicians included nine singers, a seven-piece string section, and five brass and woodwind players.

Big Star's Third—which always includes an orchestra—has since been performed with as many as 45 people. Guest vocalists and musicians have included Ken Stringfellow, The Bangles, Jon Auer, Peter Buck, Pat Sansone, Dean Wareham, Cat Power, Kurt Vile, Jason Falkner, Matthew Sweet, Norman Blake, Ira Kaplan, Michael Stipe, Aimee Mann, Robyn Hitchcock, Ray Davies, Van Dyke Parks, Django Haskins, Pete Yorn, Tommy Keene, Skylar Gudasz and Brett Harris. Big Star's Third now plays Big Star's debut album, #1 Record in its entirety, as well as songs by Chris Bell, Big Star's original guitarist, who died in 1978.

Big Star's Third has received significant critical acclaim. Of the Sydney show, the Australian reported that "...for all of its jaggedness, it is underpinned by a haunting, visceral brilliance that shines (and truly sparkled) as it was performed live." Rolling Stone wrote that the album was performed to "loving effect, with a striking fidelity to the 1974 arrangements and weirdness," and MTV described a New York show as "inspired and imperfect, like the music on which it was based."
