= Invitation (Filthy Friends album) =

Studio album by Filthy Friends
- Released: August 25, 2017
- Recorded: 2017
- Studio: Type Foundry
- Genre: Alternative rock
- Length: 38:47
- Language: English
- Label: Kill Rock Stars

Filthy Friends chronology
Invitation (2017)	Emerald Valley (2019)

Invitation is the debut album by alternative rock supergroup Filthy Friends; it was released on Kill Rock Stars in 2017.

== Reception ==
Stephen Thomas Erlewine of AllMusic awarded the album four out of five stars, writing, "It's as fun as it's galvanizing, a record that draws strength from its casual nature." Pitchfork's Alfred Soto gave the album a 6.5 out of 10, praising the performance but noting that the music, "depends on its lack of surprise... It is a good time, and not much more."

== Track listing ==
All songs written by Peter Buck and Corin Tucker

1. "Despierta" – 4:19
2. "Windmill" – 3:56
3. "Faded Afternoon" – 3:19
4. "Any Kind of Crowd" – 3:15
5. "Second Life" – 2:38
6. "The Arrival" – 2:19
7. "Come Back Shelley" – 3:59
8. "No Forgotten Son" – 3:13
9. "Brother" – 3:43
10. "You and Your King" – 3:10
11. "Makers" – 2:22
12. "Invitation" – 2:34

== Personnel ==
=== Filthy Friends ===
- Kurt Bloch – guitar, cover design, production
- Peter Buck – guitar production
- Scott McCaughey – bass guitar, keyboards, backing vocals, production
- Krist Novoselic – bass guitar, production
- Bill Rieflin – drums, percussion, mixing, production
- Corin Tucker – vocals, production

=== Technical personnel ===
- Ed Brooks – digital mastering
- Don Gunn – mixing, percussion
- Adam Seizer – engineering
- Francesca Sundsten – cover art
