= Peter Buck (album) =

Studio album by Peter Buck
- Released: October 5, 2012
- Recorded: 2012
- Genre: Alternative rock
- Length: 44:09
- Language: English
- Label: Mississippi
- Producer: Peter Buck

Peter Buck chronology
Peter Buck (2012)	I Am Back to Blow Your Mind Once Again (2014)

Peter Buck is the debut solo album from Peter Buck. It has received positive critical reception.

== Recording and promotion ==
The album was initially announced by long-time collaborator Scott McCaughey in an interview with KIRO-FM on March 14, 2012, with an off-hand remark that Buck had been recording with no firm plans for a release. The collaborators spent four days in the studio, recording and mixing. On May 26, 2012, Buck performed with Joseph Arthur, playing the song "10 Million B.C." live and contributing vocals, which he had rarely done in his three decades with R.E.M. An unfinished studio recording of the song was broadcast on WMFU's Diane's Kamikaze Fun Machine by guest DJ Steve Wynn on June 14, 2012. McCaughey e-mailed Seattle Weekly on August 14, 2012, to confirm that the album was being released on vinyl only through local label Mississippi Records with no firm release date. Buck formed the group Richard M. Nixon to preview the material live alongside McCaughey's band Young Fresh Fellows.

== Critical reception ==
Professional ratings
Aggregate scores
Source	Rating
Metacritic	77/100 (four reviews)
Review scores
Source	Rating
AllMusic Guide	4/5 stars

According to the review aggregator Metacritic, Peter Buck received "generally favorable reviews" based on a weighted average score of 77 out of 100 from four critic scores. Editors at AllMusic Guide scored this album four out of five stars, with critic Stephen Thomas Erlewine praising "how filthy it feels" and "a back-to-basics move for Buck".

== Track listing ==
All songs composed by Peter Buck

Side one

1. "10 Million B.C." – 3:04
2. "It's Alright" – 3:34
3. "Some Kind of Velvet Sunday Morning" – 4:15
4. "Travel Without Arriving" – 4;13
5. "Migraine" – 2:17
6. "Give Me Back My Wig" – 2:50
7. "Nothing Matters" – 3:38

Side two

8. "So Long Johnny" – 2:30
9. "L.V.M.F." – 1:23
10. "Nothing Means Nothing" – 3:43
11. "Hard Old World" – 4:02
12. "Nowhere No Way" – 2:35
13. "Vaso Loco" – 1:57
14. "I'm Alive" – 4:08

The track "L.V.M.F.", featuring the sampled voice of Sonny Boy Williamson, appears only on the first pressing of 2,000 copies due to licensing restrictions, and was omitted from the repress of the LP in 2013 – which has the track name blacked out on the back cover.

== Personnel ==
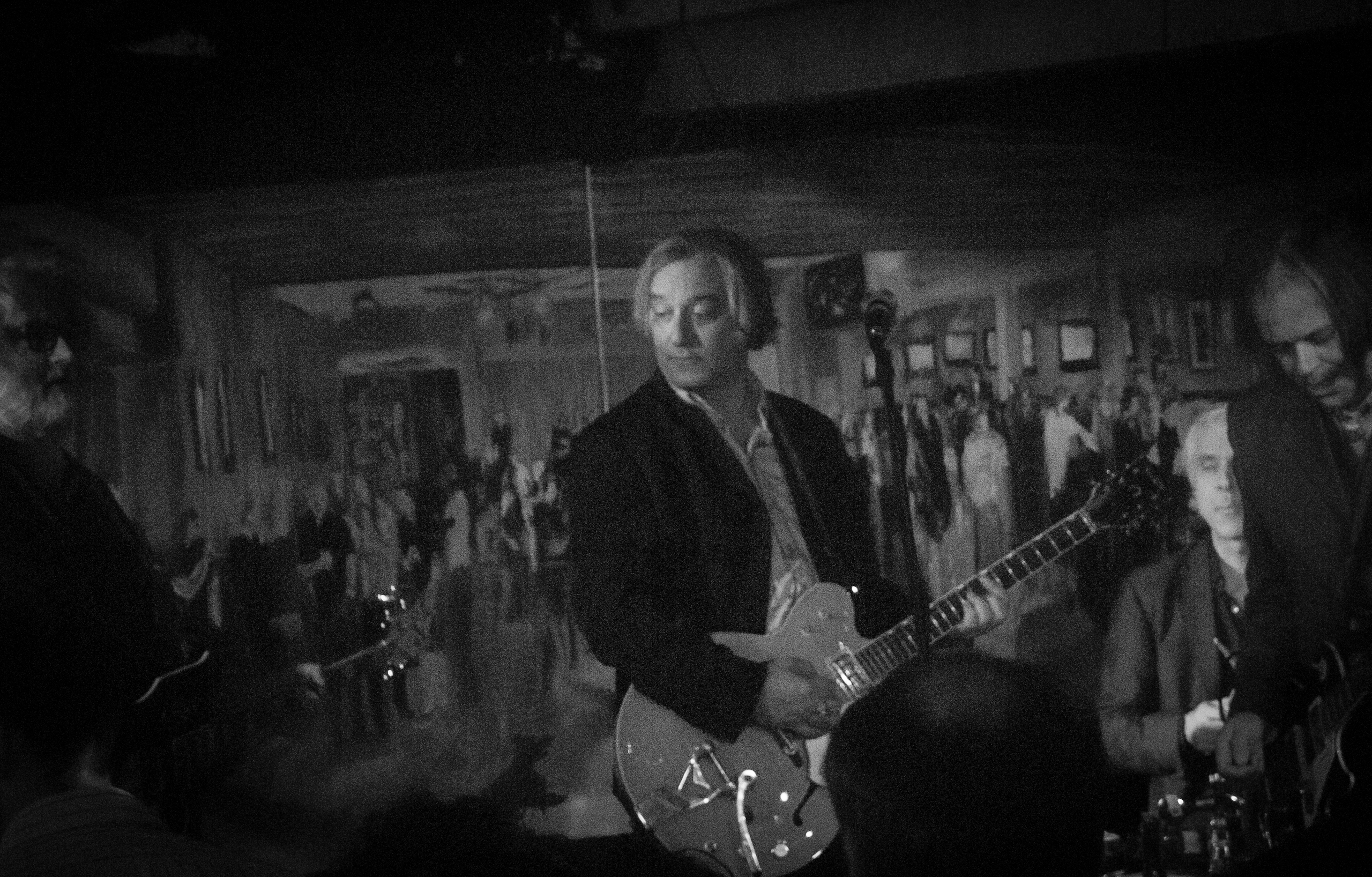
Richard M. Nixon performing in 2012, from left to right: Scott McCaughey, Peter Buck, Bill Rieflin, and Kurt Bloch

- Peter Buck – guitar, piano, vocals
- Jenny Conlee – percussion
- Lenny Kaye – guitar
- Scott McCaughey – vocals, guitar
- Mike Mills – vocals, bass guitar
- Bill Rieflin – drums
- Corin Tucker – vocals

== See also ==
- 2012 in American music
- List of 2012 albums
