= Volume 2: High and Inside =

Studio album by The Baseball Project
- Released: March 1, 2011
- Recorded: Type Foundry Studio, Portland, Oregon, United States, 2010
- Length: 46:22
- Language: English
- Label: Yep Roc
- Producer: The Baseball Project with Adam Selzer

The Baseball Project chronology
Homerun EP (2009)	Volume 2: High and Inside (2011)	The Broadside Ballads (2011)

Volume 2: High and Inside is the second album from The Baseball Project, released by Yep Roc Records on March 1, 2011.

== Critical reception ==
Volume 2 received generally favorable reviews from critics.

Professional ratings
Aggregate scores
Source	Rating
Metacritic	74%
Review scores
Source	Rating
AllMusic	4/5 stars
Robert Christgau	A–
Paste	7.8/10
Spin	7/10

== Track listing ==
1. "1976" (Wynn/Buck) – 3:37
2. "Panda and The Freak" (McCaughey) – 2:40
3. "Fair Weather Fans" (Wynn/McCaughey/Pitmon) – 3:37
4. "Don't Call Them Twinkies" (Wynn/Finn) – 4:26
5. "Chin Music" (Wynn) – 3:47
6. "Buckner's Bolero" (McCaughey) – 5:45
7. "Tony (Boston's Chosen Son)" (Wynn) – 3:09
8. "Ichiro Goes to the Moon" (McCaughey) – 2:06
9. "The Straw that Stirs the Drink" (Wynn) – 4:00
10. "Look Out Mom" (McCaughey) – 3:31
11. "Pete Rose Way" (McCaughey) – 2:04
12. "Twilight of My Career" (Wynn) – 3:32
13. "Here Lies Carl Mays" (McCaughey) – 4:08

iTunes Store bonus tracks

14. "Dizzy Dean – 2:57
15. "The Magic Mitt of Jason Byles" – 1:51

== Personnel ==
The Baseball Project

- Steve Wynn – vocals, guitars
- Linda Pitmon – drums, percussion, vocals
- Scott McCaughey – vocals, guitars, keyboards, bass, percussion
- Peter Buck – bass, 12-string guitar

Guests

- Craig Finn – lead vocal (4)
- Ben Gibbard – backing vocals (8)
- Robert Lloyd – piano (5, 7, 9, 12), organ (1, 7, 9, 12)
- Steve Berlin – baritone sax (3, 9), farfisa organ (5)
- Chris Funk – dobro (11), banjo, (11, 13), lap steel, 12-string, tenor guitar (13)
- Paul Brainard – pedal steel (6, 12, 13), trumpet (6)
- John Moen – backing vocals (1, 13)
- Ira Kaplan – guitar (6)
- Rodrigo D'Erasmo – violin (7)

Production

Produced by The Baseball Project and Adam Selzer.
Recorded by Adam Selzer at Type Foundry, Portland OR.
Mixed by John Agnello at Headgear Studios, Brooklyn, NY
Additional recording by:

- Scott McCaughey (The Record Room, Portland and Headgear, Brooklyn)
- Kevin Jarvis (Sonic Boom Room, Venice CA)
- and by Ben Gibbard, Chris Funk, Rodrigo D'Erasmo, and James McNew (various mystery locales)

Mastered by Greg Calbi at Sterling Sound NYC
