= Filthy Friends =

Alternative rock supergroup

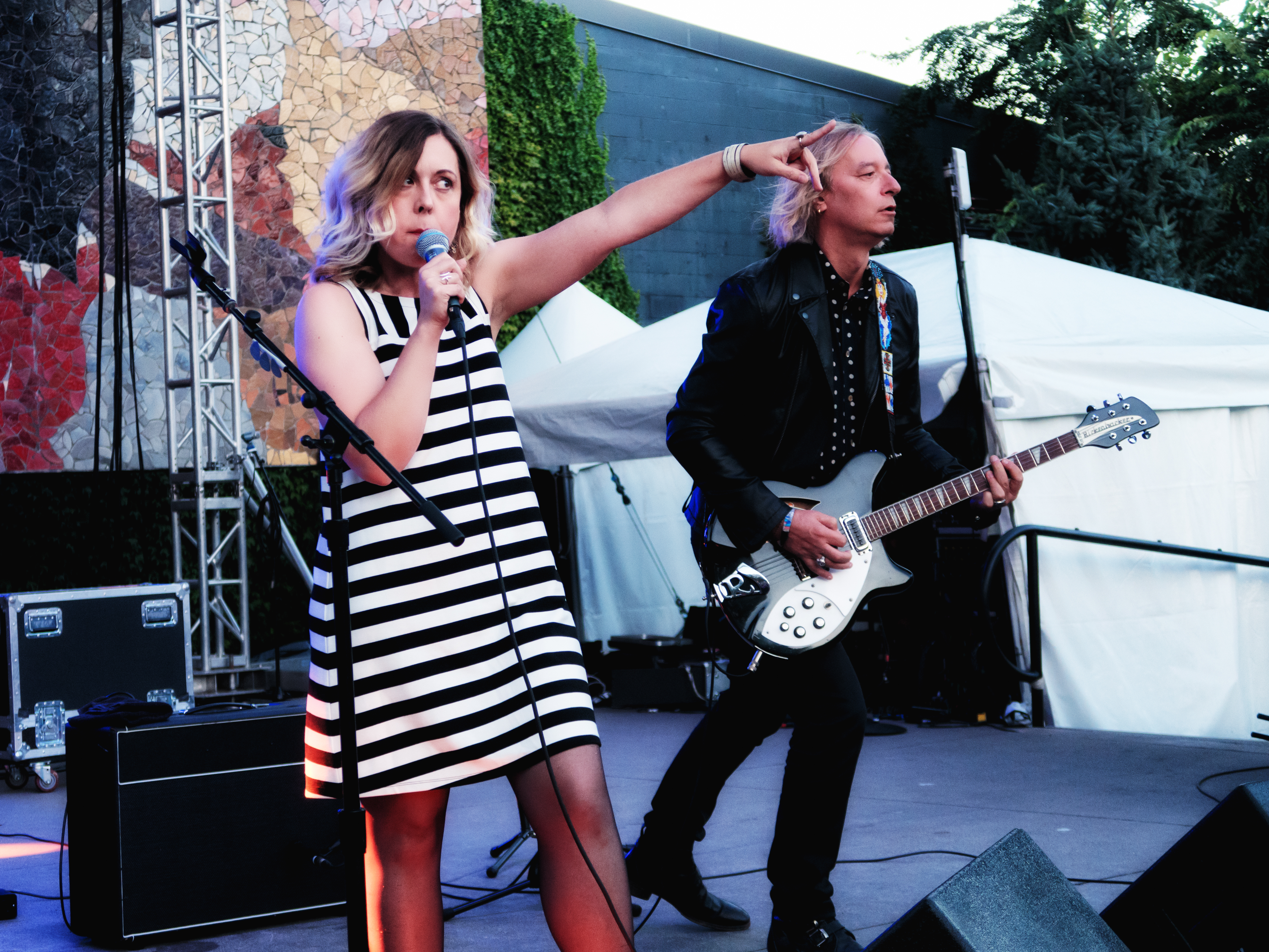
- Filthy Friends in 2017

Background information
- Also known as: Super Earth (2014–2016)
- Origin: United States
- Genres: Alternative rock
- Years active: 2014–present
- Labels: Kill Rock Stars
- Spinoff of: R.E.M.; Sleater-Kinney; The Minus 5; King Crimson; The Baseball Project; Steve Wynn & the Miracle 3
- Members: Kurt Bloch; Peter Buck; Scott McCaughey; Linda Pitmon; Corin Tucker
- Past members: Krist Novoselic; Bill Rieflin

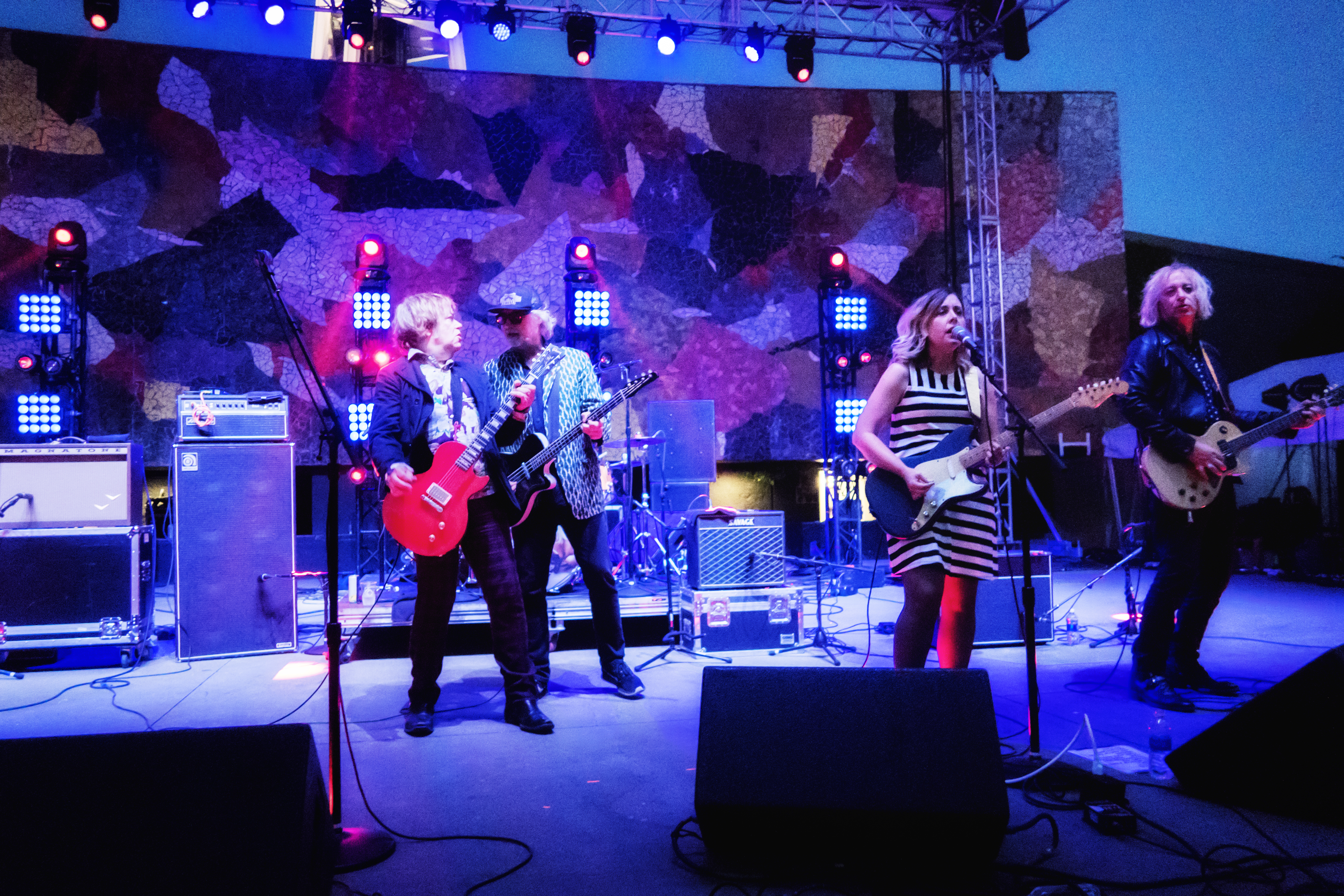
Filthy Friends in 2017, from left to right: Kurt Bloch, Scott McCaughey, Corin Tucker, Peter Buck (Linda Pitmon is obscured)

Filthy Friends is an alt-rock supergroup based in Portland, Oregon. The band is fronted by Corin Tucker (of Sleater-Kinney) and guitarist Peter Buck (formerly of R.E.M.) The other members of the band include alumni from bands such as the Minus 5, King Crimson, The Baseball Project and Steve Wynn & the Miracle 3.

== History ==
The band, with the tentative name of Super Earth, first convened in the studio in 2014. This line-up consisted of Tucker, Buck, former Nirvana bassist Krist Novoselic, Minus 5 and Young Fresh Fellows multi-instrumentalist and singer Scott McCaughey, Fastbacks and Young Fresh Fellows guitarist Kurt Bloch, and Ministry drummer Bill Rieflin. Regardless of the lineup, the band requested that it not be called a "supergroup," and considered the band to be a "passion-project."

After Super Earth's first show in 2014, another band with a similar name sent a letter asking the group to change its name. In 2016, now under the official moniker of Filthy Friends, the band performed a series of live shows in tribute to the late David Bowie. Later that year, the group released its first song. "Despierta" – Spanish for "awake" – criticized then-U.S. presidential candidate Donald Trump, and was written as part of the 30 Days, 30 Songs project. "Any Kind of Crowd", the group's debut single, was released on March 1, 2017, which was later included on a 7" that also featured a cover of Roxy Music's "Editions of You" as its B-side. It was released via Kill Rock Stars the following April.

Their debut album, Invitation, was announced June 20, 2017, along with the release of the lead single "The Arrival". Invitation was released that August. One reviewer noted that "the band dabbles in blues, throwback college rock, even T. Rex-style glam." Although Novoselic and Rieflin played on the album, both had left the band by the time it was released. McCaughey took over Novoselic's bass duties and Rieflin was replaced by Linda Pitmon who had worked with both Buck and McCaughey in their band The Baseball Project. In an interview, Buck said, "The first record was an accident really, we just wrote some songs when I had days off from making records with other people or my solo records."

In February 2019, the band announced its second studio album, Emerald Valley, which was released on May 3. The announcement came with the release of the single "Last Chance County." According to Tucker, the songs on this album focus around the impact of climate change in the Northwest. In a review in Pitchfork, Sash Geffen noted that Emerald Valley "sharpens the group’s political fangs, letting shiny happy instrumentation serve as a backdrop for protest songs about the pre-apocalypse." Emerald Valley was supported by a nationwide tour with twelve dates.

Creatively, the majority of Filthy Friends' songs are collaboration between Buck and Tucker, with Buck developing the music and Tucker providing vocals and guitar arrangements. Tucker says she prefers the writing in person: "That's the way I want to write. It's easiest for me. I enjoy it more. I can do the songwriting with files, but for this band, I really enjoy doing it in person."

== Members ==
Current members

- Kurt Bloch – lead guitar (2014–present)
- Peter Buck – rhythm and lead guitar (2014–present)
- Scott McCaughey – bass (2015–present), keyboards, backing vocals (2014–present), rhythm guitar (2014–2015)
- Corin Tucker – lead vocals, rhythm guitar (2014–present)
- Linda Pitmon – drums, backing vocals (2017–present)

Former members

- Krist Novoselic – bass (2014–2015)
- Bill Rieflin – drums (2014–2017; died 2020)

== Discography ==
- "Despierta" (Self-released, October 21, 2016, for 30 Days, 30 Songs)
- "Any Kind of Crowd"/"Editions of You" (Kill Rock Stars, April 22, 2017, for Record Store Day)
- Invitation (Kill Rock Stars, August 25, 2017)
- Emerald Valley (Kill Rock Stars, May 3, 2019)
