= Volume 1: Frozen Ropes and Dying Quails =

Studio album by The Baseball Project
- Released: July 8, 2008
- Recorded: Jackpot! Studios, Portland, Oregon, United States, 2008
- Length: 44:44
- Language: English
- Label: Yep Roc

The Baseball Project chronology
Volume 1: Frozen Ropes and Dying Quails (2008)	Homerun EP (2009)

Professional ratings
Aggregate scores
Source	Rating
Metacritic	76%
Review scores
Source	Rating
AllMusic	4/5 stars
The Boston Phoenix	3/4 stars
MSN Music (Consumer Guide)	A
NOW	4/5
PopMatters	7/10
Pitchfork	7.4/10
Uncut	4/5 stars

The Baseball Project's first album, Volume 1: Frozen Ropes and Dying Quails was released on Yep Roc Records on July 8, 2008. The album is available on compact disc and digitally on Yep Roc's site.

== Track listing ==
1. "Past Time" (McCaughey) – 2:57
2. "Ted Fucking Williams" (Wynn) – 3:04
3. "Gratitude (For Curt Flood)" (Wynn) – 3:23
4. "Broken Man" (McCaughey) – 2:52
5. "Satchel Paige Said" (McCaughey) – 2:25
6. "Fernando" (Wynn) – 3:47
7. "Long Before My Time" (Wynn) – 3:14
8. "Jackie's Lament" (Wynn) – 3:25
9. "Sometimes I Dream of Willie Mays" (McCaughey) – 3:33
10. "The Death of Big Ed Delahanty" (Scott & Kevin McCaughey) – 3:35
11. "Harvey Haddix" (Wynn) – 4:25
12. "The Yankee Flipper" (McCaughey) – 3:40
13. "The Closer" (Wynn) – 4:24

Pre-order bonus track

14. "Blood Diamond" – 2:59

On-line bonus tracks

15. "Golden Sombrero" – 2:16
16. "The Ballad of Mike Kekich and Fritz Peterson" – 2:33

== Personnel ==
The Baseball Project

- Steve Wynn – vocals, guitars, organ, melodica
- Scott McCaughey – vocals, bass, guitars, piano, accordion, harmonica, percussion
- Linda Pitmon – drums, vocals, percussion
- Peter Buck – guitars, electric sitar, mandolin, bouzouki, 6-string bass

Production

Recorded by Adam Selzer at Jackpot!, Portland.
Mixed by Adam with Scott at Type Foundry, Portland
Mastered by Kurt Bloch for Light Bulb Ministries, Inc., Seattle
