= Games pitched =

Baseball statistic

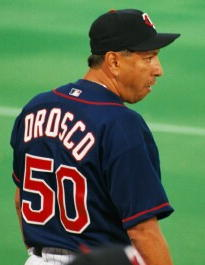
Jesse Orosco is the career leader in games pitched among Major League Baseball (MLB) players.

In baseball statistics, games pitched (denoted by Games G in tables of only pitching statistics) is the number of games in which a player appears as a pitcher. The statistic is also referred to as appearances, especially to refer to the number of games a relief pitcher has pitched in.

Normally, a pitcher must face at least one batter (or three batters in some relief situations), but exceptions are made in the case of injury. A notable example was Larry Yount, who suffered an injury while throwing warmup pitches after being summoned as a reliever in a Major League Baseball (MLB) game on September 15, 1971. He did not face a batter, but was credited with an appearance because he had been announced as a substitute. Yount never appeared in (or actually played in) any other MLB game.

== Major League Baseball career leaders ==
Listed below are all MLB players with at least 1,000 games pitched. The first player to reach the mark was Hoyt Wilhelm, in May 1970. LaTroy Hawkins is the most recent player to reach the mark, having achieved it in September 2014. As of April 2025, no active player has reached the milestone; Kenley Jansen leads active players, with over 870 games pitched.

Key
Pitcher	Name of the pitcher
Appearances	Career games pitched in MLB
MLB seasons	The seasons the pitcher played in the major leagues
†	Elected to the Baseball Hall of Fame
‡	Denotes a pitcher who is still active

Players with 1,000 or more games pitched
Pitcher	Appearances	MLB seasons	
Pitcher	Appearances	First	Last
Jesse Orosco	1,252	1979	2003
Mike Stanton	1,178	1989	2007
John Franco	1,119	1984	2005
Mariano Rivera^{†}	1,115	1995	2013
Dennis Eckersley^{†}	1,071	1975	1998
Hoyt Wilhelm^{†}	1,070	1952	1972
Dan Plesac	1,064	1986	2003
Mike Timlin	1,058	1991	2008
Kent Tekulve	1,050	1974	1989
LaTroy Hawkins	1,042	1995	2015
Trevor Hoffman^{†}	1,035	1993	2010
José Mesa	1,022	1987	2007
Lee Smith^{†}	1,022	1980	1997
Roberto Hernández	1,010	1991	2007
Mike Jackson	1,005	1986	2004
Goose Gossage^{†}	1,002	1972	1994

== See also ==
- Games started
- Games finished
