= Stephanie Dorgan =

American lawyer and entrepreneur

Stephanie Elizabeth Dorgan
- Occupation: Lawyer
- Known for: Crocodile Cafe
- Children: 2

Stephanie Elizabeth Dorgan is a lawyer and entrepreneur. She was the founder of the Crocodile Cafe, a music venue in Seattle.

== Early life ==
Dorgan is the oldest of four children. She grew up in the Tri-Cities in Eastern Washington.

As an undergraduate, she studied economics at Whitman College, which is located in Walla Walla, graduating in 1977. She studied law at the University of California, Berkeley School of Law, which is commonly known as "Boalt Hall."

== Career ==
Dorgan was admitted to the Washington State Bar in October 1988. She practice law as an associate of the Davis Wright Tremaine law firm in Seattle where she specialized in First Amendment cases. In the evenings, she explored the burgeoning Seattle music scene. One day, a co-worker asked if she would be interested in contributing to a start-up fund for a group of recent University of Washington graduates, who had started Club Belltown and wanted to open a larger dance club. This let to an epiphany by Dorgan to start a live music club.

While living in an apartment below the Market, she began taking walks in Belltown to scout spaces. She found a space she liked and initially wanted to call it the "Live Bait Lounge featuring the Crocodile Cafe," however, a bar in New York had a national trademark on the "Live Bait Lounge" name. In late 1990 and early 1991, Dorgan and her associates began to work on their new restaurant, bar and nightclub. At the time, Belltown was an "earthy and grimy" area with "unsavory" people, dilapidated buildings and artist squats with few other businesses. At the time, Belltown was not an obvious choice for a live music venue because most successful clubs were located in Pioneer Square. Nonetheless, Dorgan formed a limited partnership (to which she served as general partner) and spent $65,000 renovating and decorating the new space. At the time, the economy was in a slump and she was able to salvage furnishings and decorations from local businesses that had failed. The club officially opened on April 30, 1991, with a listed capacity of 381 people. Initially, Dorgan didn't even advertise, and yet the club took off.

Despite the depressed economy, the timing proved excellent for the "Croc" as it is known locally. The Seattle music scene was starting to gain national international attention due to groups like Nirvana and Pearl Jam. Within a few years, the "Croc" was the center of the local music scene with out-of-town tourists trying to see the next big group to come out of Seattle.

In 1992, Dorgan's business partners (Jerold Everard and Erickson Shirley) sued her alleging she failed to keep proper financial records and cash receipts disappeared under suspicious circumstances. Specifically, they accused Dorgan of failing to keep cash receipts from live-music admission fees, the sales of cigarettes and t-shirts, as well as revenue from pinball machines and a pool table. Dorgan settled the suit in less than a month and persuaded the court commissioner to seal the case records. The records were unsealed in August 2010 at the request of The Seattle Times, which had filed to open dozens of sealed cases.

Beginning in 1993, Dorgan's sister, Constance, served as the general manager for the club. Constance had been active in the Seattle music scene even before her sister.

When Dorgan began a relationship with Peter Buck of R.E.M., his star power helped bring famous musicians to the Croc, and Buck invested as a co-owner in the club. This association was helpful in some ways, but ultimately overshadowed Dorgan's pivotal role, which was a common dynamic in Seattle where women started clubs but their roles were obscured by more famous musician partners. Indeed, some mistakenly believed Buck had founded the club even though he wasn't really involved in the running of the club at all and it was already a "pretty happening concern" before his involvement. R.E.M. didn't even play at the Croc until 2001.

Dorgan's marriage to Buck also led to her frequent absences from the Croc, which harmed its profitability. Beginning in 2000, the club was not able to pay Dorgan a salary. The economic slump after the 9/11 attacks in 2001 impacted the club, as did the gentrification of Belltown. Though when Dorgan established the "Croc" in Belltown the area was edgy, it was eventually gentrified and became more expensive than those neighborhoods surrounding it. The more affluent new residents of Belltown were not necessarily people who would attend live music performances, and the Croc had trouble competing with upscale new businesses in the area.

Washington State Liquor Board records indicate the Crocodile Cafe was issued one violation and several warnings between 1994 and 2010, mostly for minor issues.

In 2010, Dorgan was appointed by Mayor Greg Nickels to a task force to draft proposals for new rules governing local nightclubs. She was one of 15 club owners and neighborhood activists appointed by the mayor to serve on the task force to draft rules aimed at balancing the needs of the vibrant local music scene and residents concerned about noise, rowdy behavior and illegal conduct associated with nightclub patrons.

As of 2024, Dorgan was not entitled to practice law in the state of Washington because her license had been administratively suspended for failure to complete MCLE to maintain the license.

== Personal life ==
In 1986, Dorgan married David Ryan Walton in King County, Washington. He was a fellow lawyer and when she opened the Crocodile Cafe, she was known by her married name, Stephanie Walton. They divorced in 1993, at which time she resumed using her original last name.

In 1992, Dorgan met guitarist Peter Buck when his band R.E.M was in Seattle mixing their album Automatic for the People at the Bad Animals Studio in Belltown. Buck visited the "Croc" where he and Dorgan hit it off. Buck soon separated from his wife, Barrie Buck, the owner of the iconic 40 Watt Club in Athens, Georgia. Peter Buck moved to Seattle in 1993. He became a big part of the local music scene, became Kurt Cobain's neighbor and joined local bands.

In May 1994, Dorgan gave birth to twin daughters, Zoe and Zelda. In January 1995, Dorgan married Peter Buck in Perth, Australia while R.E.M. was on tour. The couple separated in January 2006, and a divorce was finalized in February 2007 without spousal support by either party.
