= Larry Yount =

American baseball player (born 1950)

- Pitcher
- Born: February 15, 1950 (age 76); Houston, Texas, U.S.
- Batted: Right Threw: Right

MLB debut
- September 15, 1971, for the Houston Astros

Last MLB appearance
- September 15, 1971, for the Houston Astros

MLB statistics
- Games played: 1
- Innings pitched: 0
- Batters faced: 0
- Stats at Baseball Reference

Teams
- Houston Astros (1971)

Lawrence King Yount (born February 15, 1950) is an American former professional baseball player. Yount is the only pitcher in Major League Baseball (MLB) history to be credited with one pitching appearance without facing a batter. In his only major league appearance, on September 15, 1971, he left the game during his warm-up pitches due to injury. He is the older brother of Hall of Famer Robin Yount.

== Early career ==
Yount went to Taft High School in Woodland Hills, California, and was a fifth round draft pick in the 1968 Major League Baseball draft. He impressed in the Carolina League in both 1968 and 1969 (he had a 2.25 ERA in 1969), and he was invited to spring training at the major league camp in 1970 and 1971. After a strong stint with the Astros' AAA affiliate in Oklahoma City, Yount was called up on September 2, 1971. Before he could join the big-league club, however, he had to serve a week-long stint in the military, which he later claimed tightened up his elbow.

== Houston and beyond ==
With the Astros trailing the Atlanta Braves 4–1 in the Astrodome on September 15, 1971, Yount was summoned to pitch the ninth inning. While warming up, however, Yount's elbow began to stiffen. "I went to the mound and took a couple of tosses," he later said, "but (the elbow) continued to hurt, so I came out." MLB rules state that any pitcher announced as being in the game must face at least one batter, except in case of injury. Since he was announced, Yount was credited for having played that one game, even though he did not actually face a batter. Yount is one of 31 pitchers—including Hall of Fame batter Stan Musial—to pitch at least one game in the majors with zero innings pitched; that is, they did not retire a batter. In addition, Yount is the only pitcher in major league history to be credited with zero batters faced. Yount went back to the bench, then back to the minors. In spring training in 1972, he was one of the last players cut.

Yount continued to play in the Astros organization until the end of the 1973 season. At the end of spring training, in 1974, he was traded along with another minor leaguer to the Milwaukee Brewers for outfielder Wilbur Howard. He was briefly in camp with his younger brother Robin, who was trying to make the squad as a rookie, but was quickly sent back to the minors.

The elder Yount retired after eight minor league seasons in 1976, later becoming a successful real estate developer in Arizona. He also represented his brother Robin as a sports agent.

== Personal life ==
Larry is the older brother of Robin Yount, a member of the National Baseball Hall of Fame.

Larry's son Austin Yount was drafted in the 12th round by the Los Angeles Dodgers in 2008. He had a solid year with the rookie-league Ogden Raptors that year, batting .301. His average slipped to .257 with Odgen in 2009, however, and plummeted to .152 in 2010. In 2011, Austin Yount played for the Winston-Salem Dash, a Class A affiliate in the Chicago White Sox organization, where he batted .214; he has not appeared on a pro baseball roster since.

Larry's nephew (and Robin's son) Dustin Yount played ten years in the Orioles and Dodgers organizations (and was a teammate of Austin's at Inland Empire in 2010), but never made it past AA ball, with a career batting average of .261.

The Baseball Project, a musical supergroup, included a song called "Larry Yount" on their 2014 album 3rd. Steve Wynn wrote the song after a curator at the Baseball Hall of Fame mentioned Yount's story to the band. The song is based loosely on Yount's brief major league career.

== Bibliography ==
- Tellis, Richard, Once Around The Bases, Triumph Books, Chicago, 1998, pp. 279–284.
