= William Tonks =

American musician

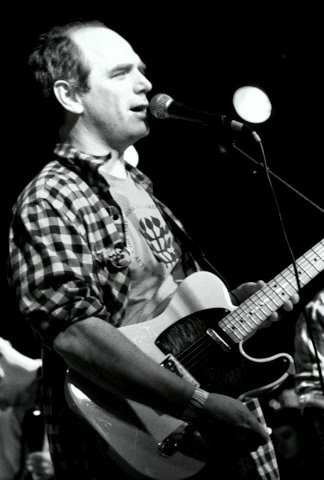
- Tonks playing guitar

Background information
- Origin: Montclair, New Jersey, United States
- Genres: Americana; Alternative Country; Ambient music
- Occupation: Musician
- Instruments: Guitar; Dobro; Vocals
- Years active: 1984 – present

William Tonks is an American musician based out of Athens, Georgia. He is most known as a dobro player, songwriter, and singer.

== Background ==
Tonks was raised in Montclair, New Jersey before moving south to Savannah, Georgia at the age of nine. His sister gave him his first guitar in Savannah, which he learned to play the instrument on. His inspiration to play the guitar came from watching the Beatles movie Help!. He began to take classical guitar lessons in Savannah, but towards the end of lessons he would work on rock songs with his teacher. Later on, in college, he formed his first popular band, Penguin Lust.

== Musical history ==
Tonks' first major musical act was that of Penguin Lust, a band he was the front man for in college at Sewanee: The University of the South in Tennessee. They played rock/Americana/reggae style music at local venues, and later recorded an album.

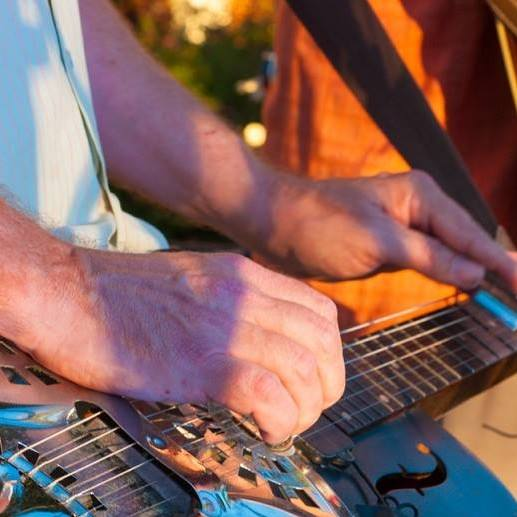

Tonks then moved to Athens, Georgia and became involved in the band Gravity Creeps, recording an album with John Keane. He at this point began to write more music and was introduced to the dobro, which he taught himself to play. Over the years, he also has been a member of bands such as Redneck Greece Deluxe, Workhorses of the Entertainment/Recreational Industry, The Hot Burritos, Barbara Cue and Bloodkin, all local bands around the Athens music scene. More recently he has played in groups such as Romper Stompers, with Todd Nance of Widespread Panic and MrJordanMrTonks, an Americana style music group. He has also performed on albums by Jack Logan, another Athens musician.

In 2007 Tonks released his debut solo album, Catch, with Ghostmeat Records. It features Athens musicians such as John Neff of Drive-By Truckers. The album has several original songs as well as covers.

Tonks’ most recent project is “Concerto for Violin, Rock Band, and String Orchestra” with noted R.E.M. bass player Mike Mills featuring violinist Robert McDuffie. The project has performed in venues all around the world such as Roy Thomson Hall in Toronto, Rome, and in the United States. The tour resumed in 2022, with a show at the Metropolitan Museum of Art in New York City. Tonks, McDuffie, and Mills have also worked together on “A Night of Georgia Music,” performing a set of songs by Georgia artists or relating to Georgia. The show was augmented by Chuck Leavell of the Allman Brothers Band, Sea Level, and The Rolling Stones on piano. A performance of the show filmed at The Grand Opera House in Macon, Ga aired on Georgia Public Television in July 2022.
