= Robert McDuffie =

American violinist

Robert McDuffie is an American violinist. He has played as a soloist with many of the major orchestras around the world including those of New York City, Los Angeles, Chicago, Montreal, Toronto, San Francisco, Philadelphia, Cleveland, Minnesota, Houston, St. Louis, Hamburg Symphony Orchestra, Leipzig Gewandhaus Orchestra, the North German Radio Symphony Orchestra, the Frankfurt Radio Orchestra, the Deutsche Kammerphilharmonie Bremen, Orchestra del Teatro alla Scala, Santa Cecilia Orchestra of Rome as well as the major orchestras of Australia and East Asia.

McDuffie has appeared on A&E's Breakfast with the Arts, CBS News Sunday Morning, NBC's The Today Show, PBS's Charlie Rose, National Public Radio, as well as the front page of The New York Times and The Wall Street Journal.

== Biography ==
McDuffie was born into a musical family in Macon, Georgia, United States. Both his mother, Susan McDuffie, and his younger sister, Margerie McDuffie, are pianists. He attended the Juilliard School in New York City as a student of Dorothy Delay, spending his summers in her studio at the Aspen Music Festival and School. He plays a Guarneri del Gesù violin made in 1735 named the "Ladenburg" that he purchased for $3.5 million. He was nominated for a Grammy in 1990 for his performance of concertos by Leonard Bernstein and William Schuman. McDuffie is a co-founder and artistic director for the Rome Chamber Music Festival in Rome, Italy. He currently lives in New York City with his wife Camille and two children, Eliza and Will.

In 2016, he toured to support a Concerto for Violin, Rock Band, and String Orchestra with childhood friend and former R.E.M. bassist Mike Mills, along with guitar players William Tonks and John Neff.

== Recordings ==
- Viennese Violin: The Romantic Music of Lehár, Kreisler & Strauss (1996)
- Violin Concerto of Samuel Barber (Part of a Collection) (1998)
- Violin Concertos of John Adams & Philip Glass (1999)
- Violin Concertos of Mendelssohn & Bruch (1999)
- Second Violin Concerto of Philip Glass (2010)

== Center for Strings ==
The Robert McDuffie Center for Strings of Mercer University offers conservatory-quality music training in a comprehensive university setting. McDuffie leads the center and has served as Distinguished University Professor of Music since 2004. The focus of the center, part of the Townsend School of Music at Mercer's main campus in Macon, Georgia, is to provide highly talented string students the opportunity to learn with some of the nation's most renowned string musicians. The center's home is the Bell House, an antebellum mansion built in 1855 and listed on the National Park Service’s National Register of Historic Places in 1972. Total enrollment is limited to 27 students: twelve violinists, six violists, six cellists and three bassists.
