= Barrie Buck =

American entrepreneur and community activist

Barrie Buck (née Greene) is an American entrepreneur and community activist. Since 1987, she has been the owner of the 40 Watt Club, a music venue in Athens, Georgia.

== Early life and education ==
Barrie Greene grew up in Atlanta in a family that loved music. She studied ballet and played flute in her school band. She has been a fan of live music since her teen years in Atlanta.

Greene moved to Athens to attend the University of Georgia, where she lived in the Creswell Hall dorm when it was not air conditioned. She graduated with a bachelor's degree in political science. She had been considering law school, but decided to stay in Athens to work after graduation.

While in Athens, she got involved in the burgeoning music scene as a bartender at O'Malley's, a music venue. Later, she began to bartend at the 40 Watt Club. Eventually, the 40 Watt Club owners wanted to go into a different career direction, and Greene bought it.

== Career ==
In 1987, she became a co-owner of the 40 Watt Club, an Athens music venue that had existed since 1978 at different locations and had had various owners. The corporate legal entity, 40 Watt Club, Inc., was formed in 1987 with Barrie Buck and Jared Bailey as co-directors, as well as the two equal shareholders. Originally, Bailey was the corporation's president, and Buck was the Secretary-Treasurer. When the corporation did not perform well financially, Bailey resigned in June 1994 and relinquished management to Buck to start his own business. Buck then ran the corporation by herself. In a 1996 lawsuit, Buck prevailed against Bailey who had sued her after she refused to give him keys to the corporate premises.

Buck is considered a trailblazer. Under her leadership, the 40 Watt Club became iconic in the music industry and is one of the largest private clubs in the nation. Buck is also one of the few female owners of a major music venue. She has named the 40 Watt Club a place that supports the local community. It hosts events like the "Boybutante Ball" benefitting a local AIDS charity, and events for Nuçi's Space, a nonprofit aimed at ending suicide. When the rival Athens venue, the Georgia Theatre, burned in 2009, Buck used the resources of the 40 Watt Club to fundraise to help the Georgia Theatre rebuild. Under Buck's leadership, the 40 Watt Club has been an incubator for new talent, often offering free space to new acts.

== Personal life ==
In the spring of 1987, Barrie Greene married Peter Buck of the alternative rock band, R.E.M.

Barrie and Peter Buck divorced in 1994, but Barrie kept her married name. That same year, Peter became a father of twins with Stephanie Dorgan.

In addition to his professional work, Buck serves on the board of directors for the nonprofit Nuçi's Space.
