= The Baseball Project =

American rock band

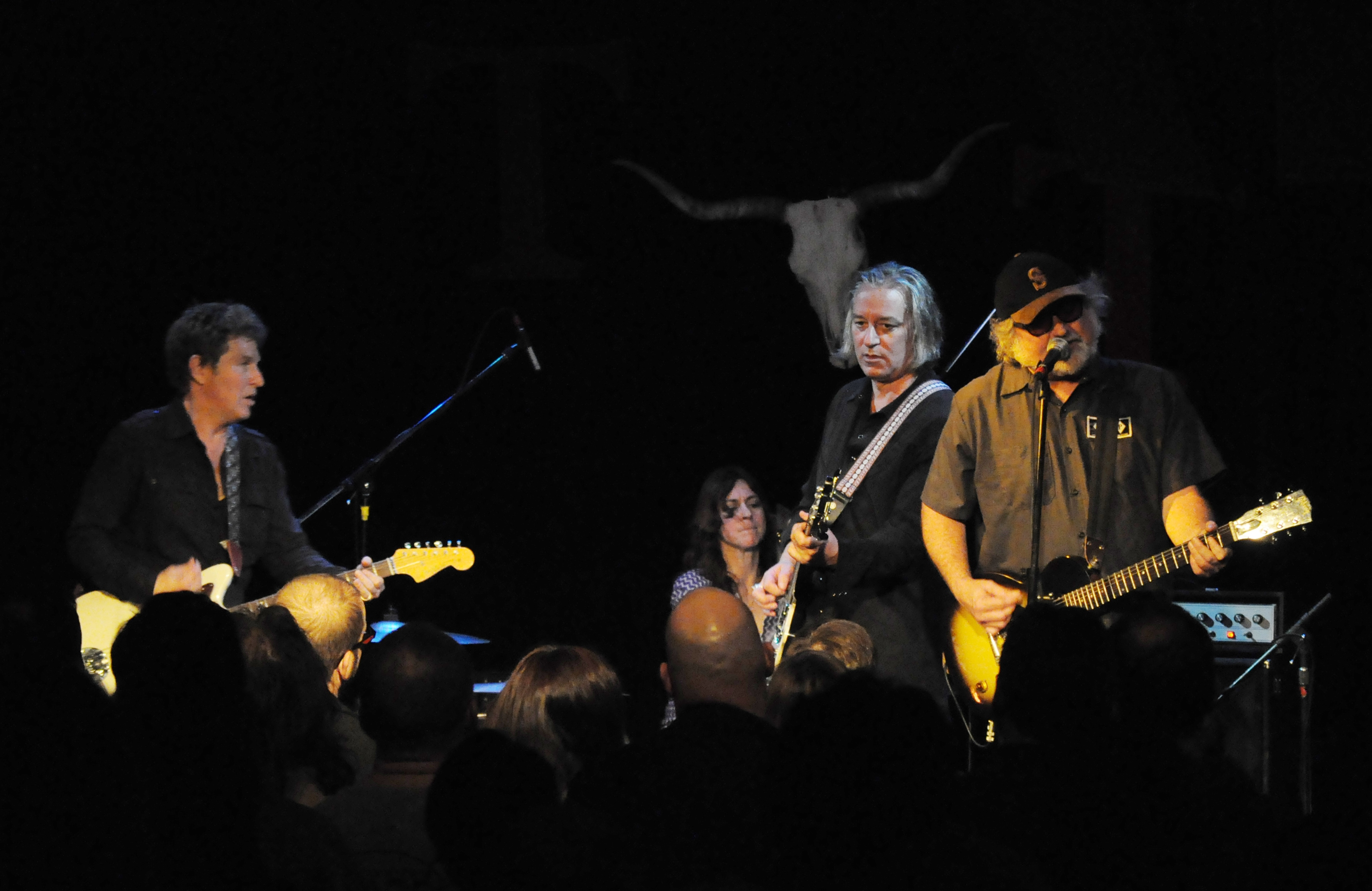
- The Baseball Project, 2011 (left to right: Steve Wynn, Linda Pitmon, Peter Buck, and Scott McCaughey)

Background information
- Genres: Rock
- Years active: 2007–present
- Label: Yep Roc
- Members: Peter Buck; Scott McCaughey; Linda Pitmon; Steve Wynn; Mike Mills
- Website: www.baseballproject.net

The Baseball Project is a supergroup composed of Peter Buck, Mike Mills, Scott McCaughey, Steve Wynn and Linda Pitmon formed in 2007. The performers came together from discussions between McCaughey and Wynn at R.E.M.'s March 21, 2007 induction into the Rock and Roll Hall of Fame at the Waldorf-Astoria Hotel in New York City. They invited Buck to play bass guitar and Pitmon on drums and recorded their first album, Volume 1: Frozen Ropes and Dying Quails later that year. Their first public appearance was on The Late Show with David Letterman in June 2008, preceding the release of any recorded material.

Buck and McCaughey have previously played together in Robyn Hitchcock and The Venus 3, The Minus 5, R.E.M., and Tuatara. Wynn is the former leader of The Dream Syndicate as well as Gutterball and has played with Pitmon in Steve Wynn & the Miracle 3. Pitmon also plays with Buck and McCaughey in Filthy Friends (with Kurt Bloch and Corin Tucker) and their project with Luke Haines (of the Auteurs).

The band also recorded a 'real time' commentary on the 2010 baseball season for ESPN.com: one song every month made available as a free download. The collection was released in 2011 as The Broadside Ballads and also includes a few unreleased extra tracks from Volume 1: Frozen Ropes and Dying Quails and Volume 2: High and Inside.

The second album from The Baseball Project, Volume 2: High and Inside, was released on March 1, 2011, on Yep Roc Records. The band followed the record's release with a tour covering the U.S. and appearances at spring training games in Arizona's Cactus League. Mike Mills begins touring regularly with the band in 2012, taking over bass duties from Peter Buck. Buck moves over to his signature 12-string guitar role around this time.

Their third album, 3rd, includes Mike Mills playing bass on all tracks for the first time on a Baseball Project recording, and was released in 2014. Not long after that the band played a special show in Cooperstown, New York, at the Baseball Hall of Fame. In 2019 they played a 3-day residency at the Rock and Roll Hall of Fame in Cleveland as a part of the All-Star Game festivities in the city.

Their fourth album, Grand Salami Time, was recorded with early R.E.M. collaborator Mitch Easter at his Fidelitorium Recordings studio in Kernersville, N.C., and was released on June 30, 2023, on Omnivore Recordings. Special guests on release include Stephen McCarthy of the Long Ryders and the Jayhawks and Steve Berlin of Los Lobos.

== Discography ==
=== Studio albums ===
- Volume 1: Frozen Ropes and Dying Quails (Yep Roc, 2008)
- Volume 2: High and Inside (Yep Roc, 2011)
- The Broadside Ballads (Book, 2011)
- 3rd (Yep Roc, 2014)
- Grand Salami Time (Omnivore Recordings, June 30, 2023)

=== EPs and singles ===
- The Homerun EP (Yep Roc, 2009, collaboration with Reckless Kelly, Todd Snider, and The Young Fresh Fellows)
- "El Hombre" (Euclid Records single, 2012)
