= Hindu Love Gods (album) =

Studio album by Hindu Love Gods
- Released: October 5, 1990
- Recorded: January–February 1987
- Studio: Record One, Sherman Oaks, California; A&M Studios, Los Angeles
- Genre: Blues rock
- Length: 36:58
- Label: Giant/Reprise/Warner Bros. Records
- Producer: Niko Bolas; Andrew Slater

Professional ratings
Review scores
Source	Rating
Allmusic	4.5/5 stars

Hindu Love Gods is the only album by American band Hindu Love Gods, which was released in 1990. The album was recorded around the same time as Warren Zevon's album Sentimental Hygiene, for which Zevon had enlisted Bill Berry, Peter Buck and Mike Mills of R.E.M. as players. The musicians also recorded this set of songs, mainly cover versions of old blues tunes, reputedly during late-night recording sessions, not originally intending them for release. According to Zevon and Mills, Zevon's manager made the decision to publish the album without consulting the musicians, creating a public rift between Zevon and the musicians.

== Track listing ==
1. "Walkin' Blues" (Robert Johnson) – 4:12
2. "Travelin' Riverside Blues" (Robert Johnson) – 4:02
3. "Raspberry Beret" (Prince Rogers Nelson) – 3:53
4. "Crosscut Saw" (Fred Ingrahm, Bill Sanders) – 3:06
5. "Junko Pardner" (Bob Shad) – 2:39
6. "Mannish Boy" (Bo Diddley, Melvin London, Muddy Waters) – 6:57
7. "Wang Dang Doodle" (Willie Dixon) – 3:51
8. "Battleship Chains" (Terry Anderson) – 3:06
9. "I'm a One-Woman Man" (Tillman Franks, Johnny Horton) – 2:16
10. "Vigilante Man" (Woody Guthrie) – 2:56

== Personnel ==
Hindu Love Gods

- Bill Berry – drums
- Peter Buck – guitar
- Mike Mills – bass guitar
- Warren Zevon – vocals, guitar

Production

- Niko Bolas – production, engineering
- Richard Landers – engineering
- Rail Jon Rogut – engineering
- Andrew Slater – production
- Bob Vogt – engineering

== Sales chart performance ==
Year	Chart	Position
1990	Billboard 200	168

=== Singles ===
Year	Single	Chart	Position
1990	"Raspberry Beret"	Modern Rock Tracks	23
