= Emerald Valley =

Studio album by Filthy Friends
- Released: May 3, 2019
- Length: 34:49
- Label: Kill Rock Stars

Filthy Friends chronology
Invitation (2017)	Emerald Valley (2019)

Singles from Emerald Valley
- 1. "Last Chance County" Released: February 11, 2019

Emerald Valley is the second studio album by American band Filthy Friends. It was released on May 3, 2019 under the Kill Rock Stars label.

== Critical reception ==
Professional ratings
Aggregate scores
Source	Rating
Metacritic	68/100
Review scores
Source	Rating
AllMusic	3.5/5 stars
American Songwriter	2/5 stars
Consequence of Sound	B-
Pitchfork	6.1/10

According to the review aggregator Metacritic, Emerald Valley received "generally favorable reviews" based on a weighted average score of 68 out of 100 from 12 critic scores.

== Track listing ==
No.	Title	Length
1.	"Emerald Valley"	3:58
2.	"Pipeline"	4:14
3.	"November Man"	3:00
4.	"Only Lovers Are Broken"	3:24
5.	"Angels"	3:54
6.	"The Elliott"	3:23
7.	"One Flew East"	3:34
8.	"Break Me"	2:45
9.	"Last Chance County"	2:51
10.	"Hey Lacey"	3:46

== Charts ==
Chart performance for Emerald Valley
Chart (2019)	Peak
US Independent Albums (Billboard)	30
US Heatseekers Albums (Billboard)	8
US Tastemaker Albums (Billboard)	14
