= Hindu Love Gods (band) =

Blues rock band

- Hindu Love Gods, 1990. From left to right: Peter Buck, Bill Berry, Mike Mills, and Warren Zevon

Background information
- Origin: Athens, Georgia, US
- Genres: Blues rock
- Years active: 1984–1990
- Label: Giant/Reprise/Warner Bros. Records
- Past members: Bryan Cook; Bill Berry; Peter Buck; Mike Mills; Michael Stipe; Warren Zevon

Hindu Love Gods was an American rock band that was, in essence, an occasional side project of members of R.E.M., that at times also included Warren Zevon and Bryan Cook.

== History ==
The band debuted with three scattered gigs (all in Athens, Georgia) in 1984. The group played mostly cover tunes, though a few unreleased originals also made it into the mix. The first gig took place on February 15, 1984, and featured Bryan Cook (vocals and organ, a member of Athens bands Is/Ought Gap, Club Gaga, Thumb Attack, Oh-OK and Time Toy), and R.E.M. members Bill Berry (drums), Peter Buck (guitar) and Mike Mills (bass). The follow-up gig took place on February 29, two weeks later; added to the line-up was R.E.M. lead singer Michael Stipe on vocals, and Warren Zevon on vocals, keyboards, and guitar. Zevon had known the R.E.M. members "for years" through a mutual acquaintance dating back to Peter Buck's university years. Zevon performed his hit "Werewolves of London", as well as several other songs that were, at that point, unrecorded (including "Boom Boom Mancini" and "Trouble Waiting to Happen"). The final 1984 gig took place on June, and featured the Cook/Berry/Buck/Mills line-up.

The group entered the studio as a quintet on February 28 (the day before their second gig), with the line-up of Berry/Buck/Cook/Mills/Zevon. They recorded two songs for release as a single, which were eventually released in 1986. The A-Side, "Gonna Have a Good Time Tonight", was a cover of an Easybeats tune; the B-side, "Narrator," was a Bill Berry composition that R.E.M. had played live, but never recorded. (The song's composition was credited to Berry/Buck/Mills/Stipe.) Cook was the lead vocalist on both tracks.

After a period of inactivity, Hindu Love Gods played one 1986 gig in Athens as a benefit for the family of the recently deceased musician D. Boon of San Pedro band Minutemen who had once toured with R.E.M. The personnel for this performance was Berry, Buck, Cook, Mills and Stipe.

Buck, Mills and Berry later joined Zevon as his back-up band while recording Zevon's solo album Sentimental Hygiene (1987). During an all-night session in the midst of recording Zevon's album, the four recorded ten cover songs, mostly blues standards. In a 2025 retrospective interview Peter Buck refuted a rumor that that session was recorded while drunk, noting there was no alcohol in the studio out of respect for Warren's sobriety. Although originally not intended for publication, these recordings were finally released by Giant Records on the album Hindu Love Gods (1990), with the artist credit going to Hindu Love Gods. Zevon's management offered him an advanced payment to release the album, which Zevon had stated he needed for his financial troubles and to pay for his children's college; the other band members agreed to the deal to support Zevon but felt resentment towards his management for pushing the deal. The song that received the most attention was a rock version of Prince's 1985 hit "Raspberry Beret", which reached No. 23 on the Modern Rock charts.

During a concert at The Shadow in Kansas City in December 1990, Zevon commented that the album was "selling by the shitload," whereupon one of his backing band informed him that it was "selling like shit." The album peaked at No. 168 on Billboard's Top Album Charts. Zevon and Buck would retain a friendship talking about books with each other for a few years after the album's release, but Zevon and the R.E.M. members would eventually drift apart. Zevon would publicly state there was some resentment between the rest of the group and himself, and Buck would later note he had told Zevon his management had screwed them over.

After the public announcement of Zevon's cancer diagnosis in 2002, the other members of the band attempted to reconnect with Zevon, but were only able to get in touch with his management to whom they expressed their condolences. A vinyl reissue of the band's album was released for 2025's Record Store Day to which Buck expressed excitement for people to rediscover the band.

== Discography ==
=== Albums ===
List of albums, with selected details and chart positions
Title	Album details	Peak chart positions	
Title	Album details	US	AUS
Hindu Love Gods	Released: 1990; Label: Reprise (759924406-2); Format: CD	168	81

=== Singles ===
- "Gonna Have a Good Time Tonight"/"Narrator" (7" single)
- "Raspberry Beret" (single)
