= Peter Buck =

American guitarist and songwriter (born 1956)

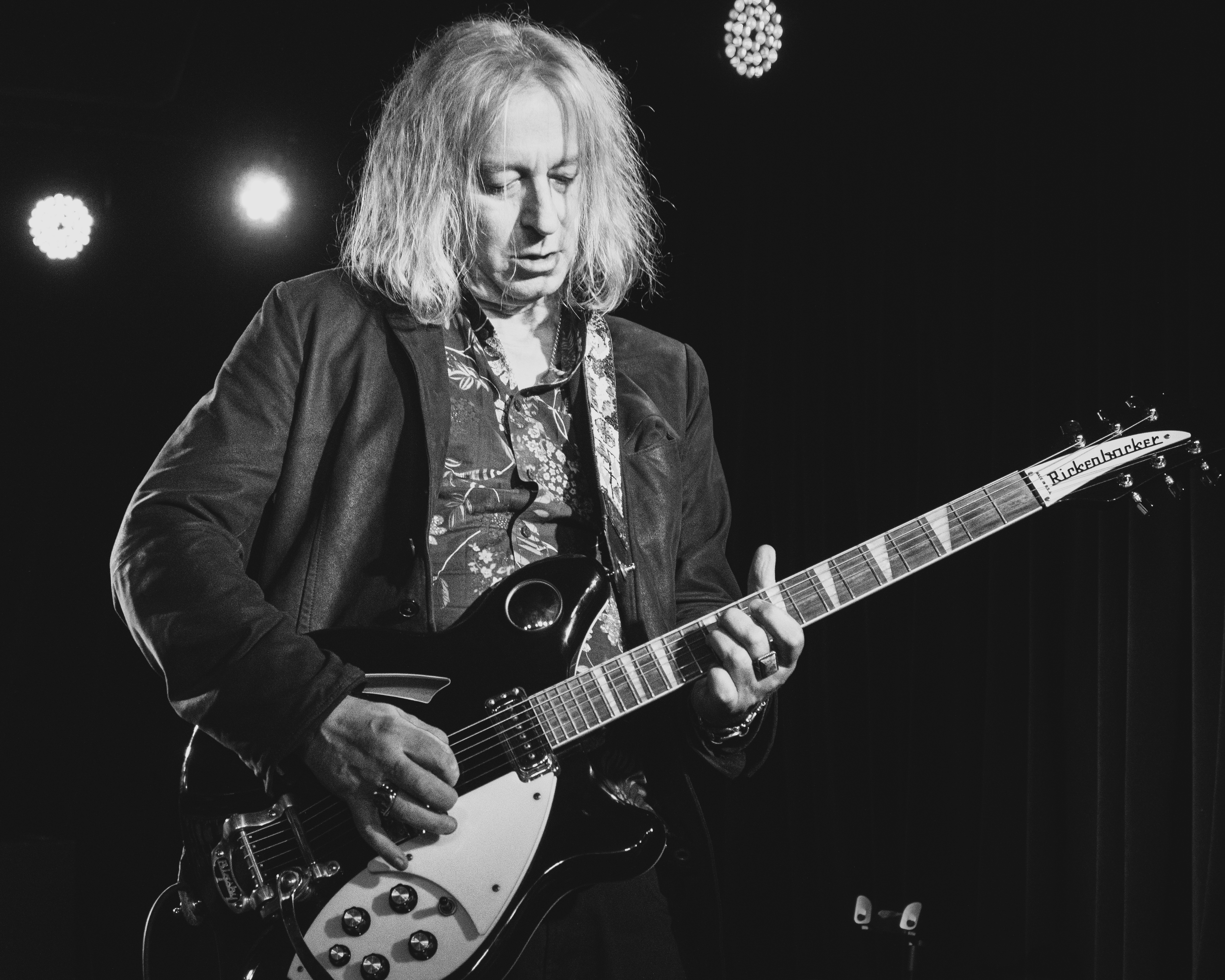
- Buck in 2022

Background information
- Born: Peter Lawrence Buck; December 6, 1956 (age 69); Berkeley, California, U.S.
- Genres: Alternative rock, folk rock, punk rock
- Occupations: Musician, songwriter
- Instruments: Guitar, mandolin, banjo, bass guitar
- Years active: 1976–present
- Formerly of: R.E.M.

Peter Lawrence Buck (born December 6, 1956) is an American musician and songwriter. He was a co-founder and the lead guitarist of the alternative rock band R.E.M.; he played the banjo and mandolin on several R.E.M. songs. Throughout his career with R.E.M. (1980–2011), as well as during his subsequent solo career, Buck has been at various times a member of numerous side project groups. These groups included Arthur Buck (with Joseph Arthur), Hindu Love Gods, The Minus 5, Tuatara, The Baseball Project, Robyn Hitchcock and the Venus 3, Tired Pony, The No-Ones, and Filthy Friends, each of which have released at least one full-length studio album. Additionally, the experimental combo Slow Music have released an official live concert CD. Another side project group called Full Time Men released an EP while Buck was a member. As well, ad hoc "supergroups" Bingo Hand Job (Billy Bragg and R.E.M.), Musical Kings (Michelle Malone, Peter Buck, John Keane) and Nigel & The Crosses (Robyn Hitchcock, Peter Buck, Glenn Tilbrook and others) have each commercially released one track. Buck's latest project as of 2025 is Drink The Sea (with Lizette Garcia, Duke Garwood, Alain Johannes and Barrett Martin), and the band has released a self-titled double album in Autumn 2025.

Richard M. Nixon, a band Buck founded in 2012 to support the release of his solo album with live gigs, has never issued an official recording. Richard M. Nixon consisted of Buck, Scott McCaughey and Bill Rieflin, the same three musicians who comprise The Venus 3.

Buck has a career as a record producer including releases by Uncle Tupelo, Vigilantes of Love, Dreams So Real, The Fleshtones, The Feelies, and The Jayhawks, as well as a session musician (The Replacements, Billy Bragg, Decemberists and Eels).

== Early life ==
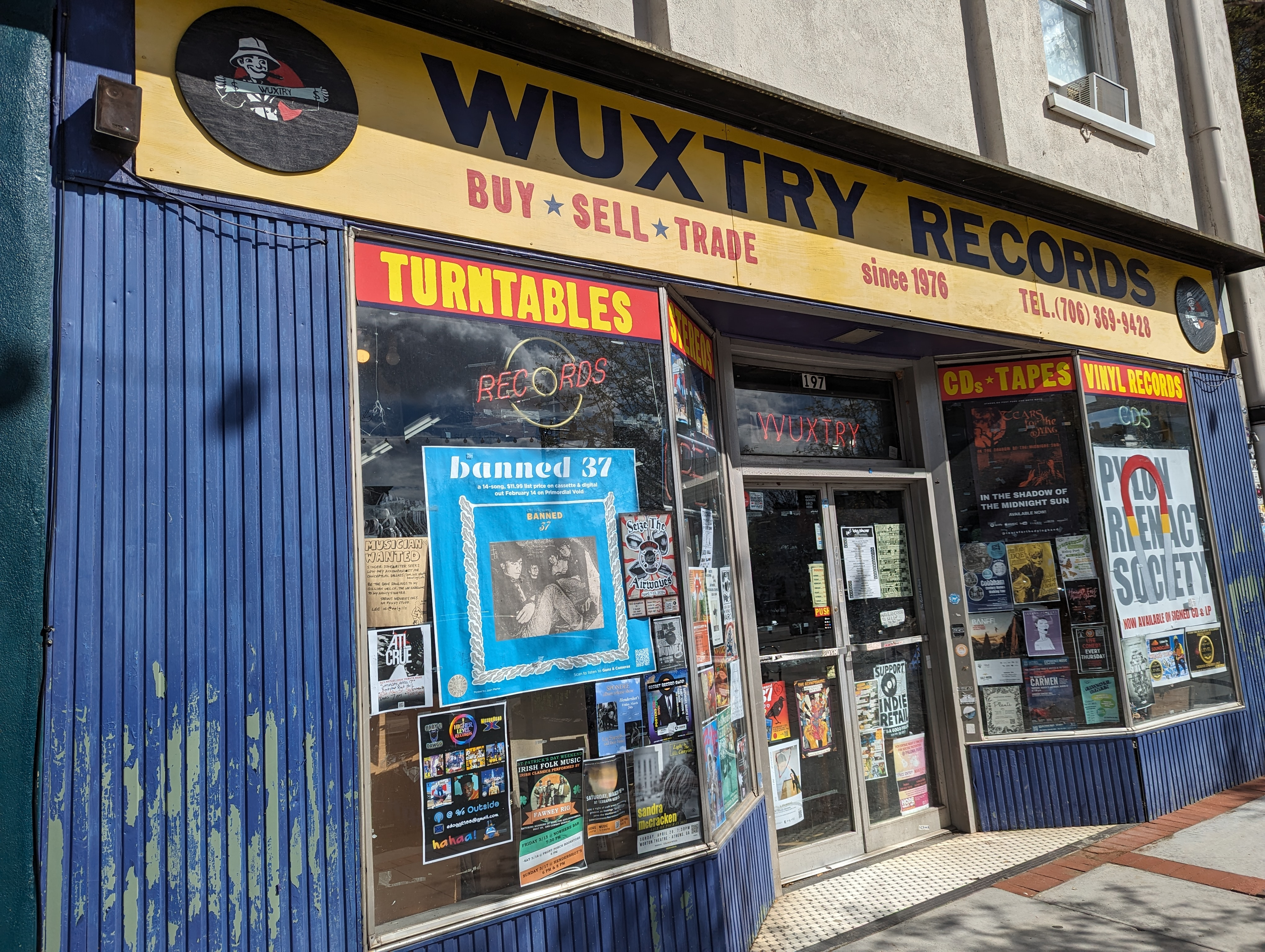
Buck was an employee at Wuxtry Records (pictured) in Athens, Georgia when he met Michael Stipe.

Peter Lawrence Buck was born on December 6, 1956, in Berkeley, California, to Peter and Violet Buck. After spending time in Los Angeles and San Francisco, the Buck family moved, via Roswell, Georgia, to Atlanta. After graduating with honors from Crestwood High School in 1975, Buck attended Emory University and joined Delta Tau Delta fraternity. He eventually dropped out of Emory. Buck moved to Athens, Georgia, and attended the University of Georgia as well. While in Athens, Buck worked at the Wuxtry Records store, where he met future bandmate Michael Stipe as well as R.E.M.'s future manager, Bertis Downs.

== Music ==
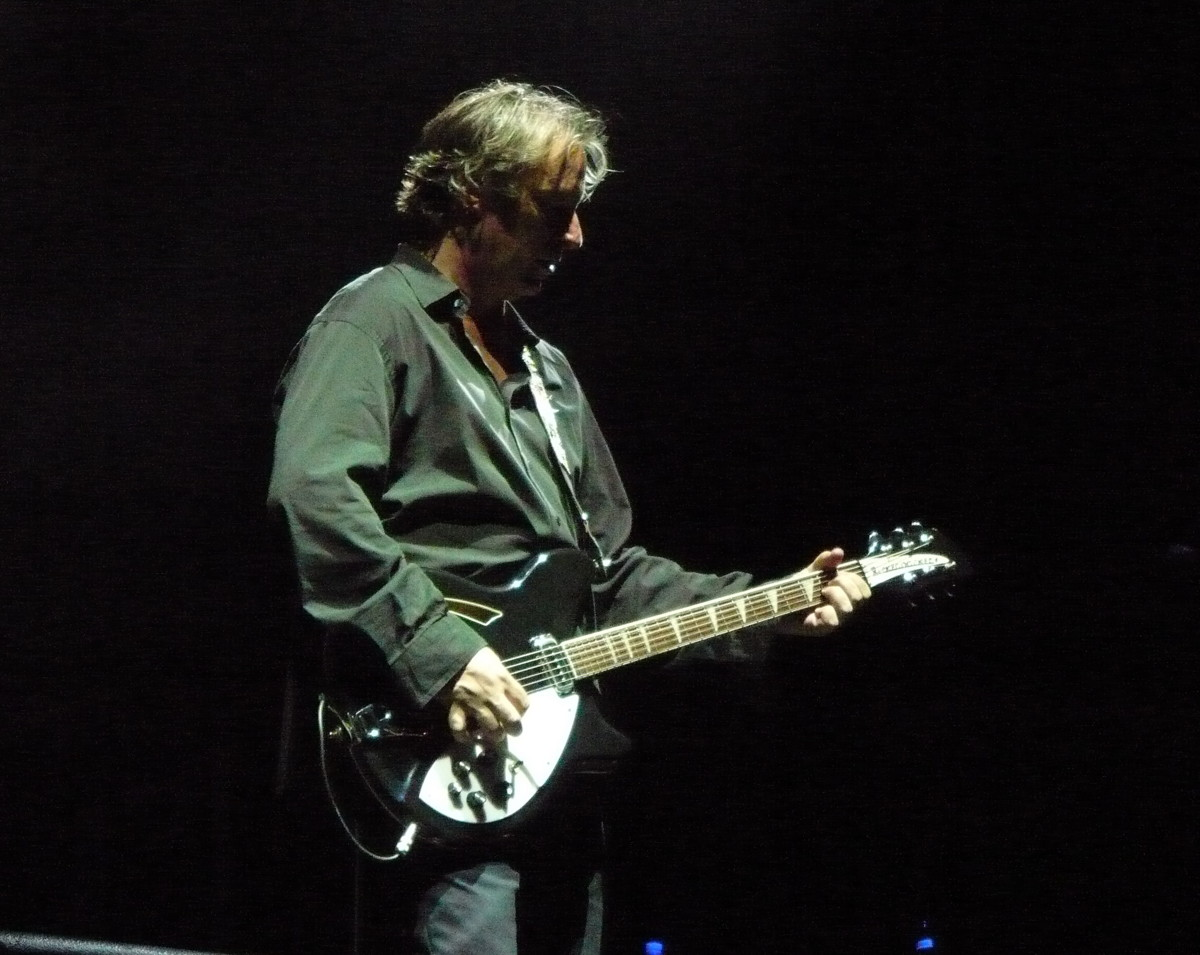
Buck on stage in Naples, Italy, in 2008

Buck interviewed in 1988, shortly after the release of R.E.M.'s Green

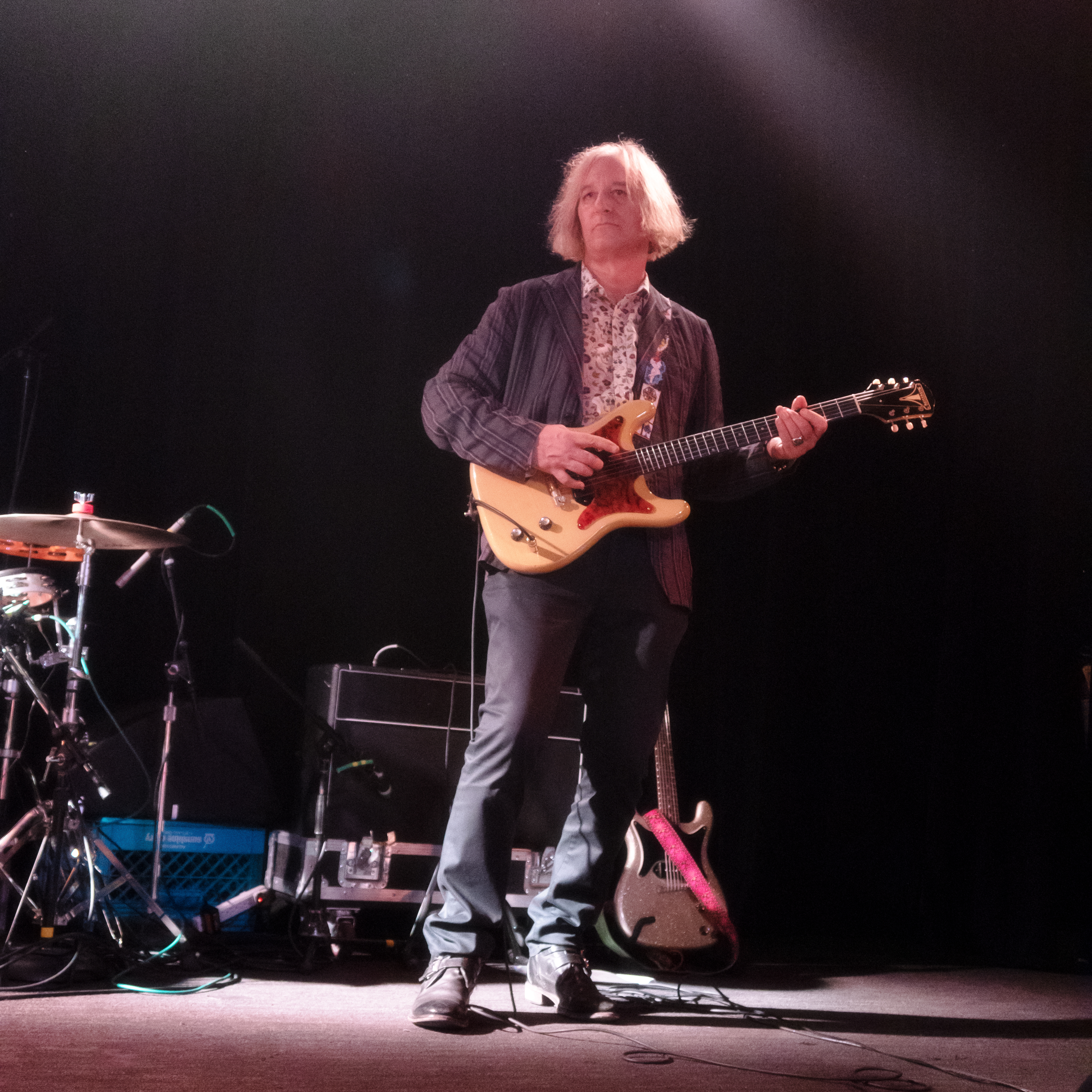
Buck with Arthur Buck in 2018

Buck's style of guitar playing is simple and yet distinctive. His arpeggiated picking makes wide use of open strings while chording to create chiming and memorable pop melodies. His sound, especially on mid-period R.E.M. albums that saw the band break through to international popularity, has been associated with Rickenbacker guitars, particularly a Jetglo (black) model 360. He has also used a wide variety of other instruments as the group continued to experiment and develop. On some more recent R.E.M. releases prior to Accelerate (2008), his guitar parts have been less prominent.

"When Peter plays guitar, there's a strong sense of fuck off that comes from his side of the stage. And you feel that he wants to be in a band because he likes what they do... but that's all," explained U2's lead singer Bono in 2003. "And it's almost like performing and having to deal with all of that is a bit of a compromise for him, so just fuck off. And I like that energy a little bit, and that gives them their aggression."

Buck has produced many bands, including Uncle Tupelo, Dreams So Real, Drivin N Cryin, The Fleshtones, Charlie Pickett, and The Feelies. Buck also has made contributions on many other musicians' albums, including The Replacements, Billy Bragg, The Decemberists, Robyn Hitchcock, and several Eels albums.

Buck, Mike Mills, Bill Berry and Warren Zevon recorded an album under the band name Hindu Love Gods, while the R.E.M. bandmates and Zevon were recording tracks for Zevon's 1987 album Sentimental Hygiene. Hindu Love Gods is one of many names the members of R.E.M. have used performing around the Athens area. Buck also continued to play live locally with the Normaltown Flyers, performing country and rock standards in local bars.

The three instrumentalists from R.E.M. all performed on Nikki Sudden's 1991 album The Jewel Thief, including the single "I Belong to You".

Buck also coproduced the 1992 Vigilantes of Love album, Killing Floor, with songwriter Mark Heard. He co-wrote, produced, and performed on Mark Eitzel's 1997 album West. He recorded an EP with Keith Streng of The Fleshtones as Full Time Men in 1985, and along with R.E.M. sideman Scott McCaughey has been a partner in The Minus 5 and a member of the instrumental band Tuatara. Additionally, In October 2005, he joined R.E.M. studio drummer Bill Rieflin, King Crimson guitarist Robert Fripp and three others in forming an improvisational performance band called Slow Music. His voice can be heard on one R.E.M. song: "I Walked with a Zombie" from the Roky Erickson tribute album Where the Pyramid Meets the Eye. In 2006, Buck toured with Robyn Hitchcock, McCaughey, and Rieflin as lead guitarist for Robyn Hitchcock and the Venus 3 in the wake of the band's first release, Olé! Tarantula. In 2008, after McCaughey and Steve Wynn decided to work together, the duo asked Buck to be the bass player in their new band, The Baseball Project, along with drummer Linda Pitmon.

Buck has contributed liner notes to compilations, reissues, and special editions, both of R.E.M.'s own material (the best-of compilations Eponymous and In Time, the rarities, B-sides and out-takes collection Dead Letter Office, and the special edition of New Adventures in Hi-Fi) and of other artists' work (such as The Beach Boys' Love You). On September 9, 2008, immediately following the band's concert in Helsinki, Buck's signature Rickenbacker guitar, used live and in the studio since Chronic Town in 1982, was stolen from the stage. It was returned on September 18, 2008, by an anonymous source.

In March 2012, six months after R.E.M.'s September 2011 dissolution, Buck, now signed to Mississippi Records, announced intentions of working on a solo album, backed by singer-songwriter Joseph Arthur. The first track from the self-titled solo album, "10 Million BC," was released via SoundCloud on June 21, 2012. His eponymous first album was released later that same year.

In the final days of 2013, Buck announced he would be releasing his second solo album soon. The new project, titled I Am Back to Blow Your Mind Once Again, was released on February 18, 2014, again on vinyl only.

In 2015, Buck released his third solo album, Warzone Earth, under Little Axe Records.

In April 2017, Buck released the first single "Any Kind of Crowd" from his latest collaborative project with Filthy Friends, a super group with long time associates Scott McCaughey, Bill Rieflin, Kurt Bloch and Corin Tucker of Sleater-Kinney. The same month also saw another new release with Buck and McCaughey teaming up with Frode Strømstad and Arne Kjelsrud Mathisen of Norwegian band I Was A King to form the group The No Ones. The first song from their Sun Station EP was released, with the EP set to follow later in the year.

Arthur Buck, a side project with singer-songwriter Joseph Arthur in which Buck and Arthur share songwriting duties, released their eponymous debut album in June 2018. The following year, the Luke Haines collaboration Beat Poetry for Survivalists was released.

== Personal life ==
Buck has been married three times, each ending in divorce. He was first married to Barrie Greene, the owner of Athens' 40 Watt Club. He and Greene married in 1987 and divorced in 1994.

He has twin daughters, born in May 1994, with Stephanie Dorgan, the owner of Seattle's Crocodile Cafe music club. Buck and Dorgan married in January 1995 while in Perth, Australia, during R.E.M.'s Monster World Tour. The couple separated in 2006, and Dorgan sued Buck for divorce in 2007. During his marriage to Dorgan, Buck became a partner in Crocodile Cafe and often played there with his other band, The Minus 5.

Buck married his third wife, Chloe Johnson, on June 1, 2013, in Portland, Oregon. The three other original bandmates of R.E.M. were all in attendance and performed at the ceremony. They divorced in 2019.

He is known for his encyclopedic knowledge of music, as well as his extensive record collection. Buck estimated his record collection to be around 25,000 in the late 1990s (he estimated he had 10,000 vinyl singles, 6,000 LPs and 4,000 CDs).

Buck is an atheist.

In the 1990s, Buck relocated to the Pacific Northwest and divided time between Portland, Oregon, and Seattle, Washington. He has also lived in Todos Santos, Baja California Sur, Mexico.

=== Airline incident ===
On April 21, 2001, Buck was aboard a transatlantic flight (British Airways #48) from Seattle to London to play a concert at Trafalgar Square. Witnesses alleged that Buck exhibited various bizarre behaviors on the flight, including shoving a compact disc into a drinks trolley thinking it was a CD player, tearing up the "yellow card" warning notice handed to him by the flight crew, claiming "I am R.E.M." and being involved in a struggle over a yogurt cup with two flight attendants, which resulted in the cup exploding. Buck's actions led to two charges of common assault on the flight attendants, one charge of being drunk on a plane and one charge of damaging British Airways cutlery and crockery.

At the ensuing trial in London, Buck's defense claimed that the moderate amount of wine he had drunk had reacted adversely with the brand of sleeping pill he was taking and rendered him unable to control his actions. The prosecution argued that he was simply intoxicated from supposedly consuming 15 glasses of wine. After the trial, which included testimony from Bono, the lead singer of the Irish rock band U2, Buck was cleared on the grounds of non-insane automatism.

== Discography ==
With R.E.M.

- Chronic Town EP (I.R.S.) 1982
- Murmur (I.R.S.) 1983
- Reckoning (I.R.S.) 1984
- Fables of the Reconstruction (I.R.S.) 1985
- Lifes Rich Pageant (I.R.S.) 1986
- Document (I.R.S.) 1987
- Green (Warner Bros.) 1988
- Out of Time (Warner Bros.) 1991
- Automatic for the People (Warner Bros.) 1992
- Monster (Warner Bros.) 1994
- New Adventures in Hi-Fi (Warner Bros.) 1996
- Up (Warner Bros.) 1998
- Reveal (Warner Bros.) 2001
- Around the Sun (Warner Bros.) 2004
- Accelerate (Warner Bros.) 2008
- Collapse into Now (Warner Bros.) 2011

Solo

- Peter Buck (Mississippi) 2012
- I Am Back to Blow Your Mind Once Again (Mississippi) 2014
- Opium Drivel (Mississippi) 2014
- Warzone Earth (Mississippi) 2015
- Dear December (Yep Rock) 2017

Produced

- Eyelids: The Accidental Falls (Jealous Butcher Records) 2020
- Dreams So Real: Father's House (Coyote) 1986
- Alejandro Escovedo: Burn Something Beautiful (Fantasy) 2016
- The Feelies: The Good Earth (Twin/Tone) 1986
- The Fleshtones: Beautiful Light (Naked Language) 1993
- John Wesly Harding: Greatest Other People's Hits (Omnivore) 2018
- The Jayhawks: Paging Mr. Proust (Thirty Tigers/Sham) 2016
- Kevn Kinney: MacDougal Blues (Island Records) 1990
- Run Westy Run: Green Cat Island (Twin/Tone) 1990
- Hector Tellez Jr.: The Great Unknown 2023
- Uncle Tupelo: March 6–20, 1992 (Rockville) 1992
- Vigilantes of Love: Killing Floor (Fingerprint/Sky) 1992

Recorded with

Arthur Buck

- Arthur Buck (New West) 2018
- Arthur Buck 2 2025

The Baseball Project

- Volume 1: Frozen Ropes and Dying Quails (Yep Rock) 2008
- Volume 2: High and Inside (Yep Rock) 2011
- 3rd (Yep Rock) 2014
- Grand Salami Time! (Yep Rock) 2023

Drink the Sea

- Drink the Sea I and II (Echo Base) 2025

Luke Haines

- Beat Poetry for Survivalists (Omnivore) 2020
- All The Kids Are Super Bummed Out (Cherry Red) 2022
- Going Down To The River To Blow My Mind (Cherry Red) 2025

Mark Eitzel

- West (Warner Bros.) 1997

Filthy Friends

- Invitation (Kill Rock Stars) 2017
- Emerald Valley (Kill Rock Stars) 2019

Full Time Men

- Full Time Men EP (Coyote) 1985

Hindu Love Gods

- Hindu Love Gods (Reprise) 1990

The Minus 5

- Old Liquidator (Glitterhouse Records) 1995
- The Lonesome Death of Buck McCoy (Hollywood/Malt) 1997
- Let the War Against Music Begin (Mammoth/Malt) 2001
- I Don't Know Who I Am (Let the War Against Music Begin, Vol. 2) (Return to Sender) 2003
- Down with Wilco (Yep Rock) 2003
- In Rock (The Minus 5 album) (Yep Rock) 2004
- Gun Album (Yep Rock) 2006
- The Minus 5 (Yep Rock) 2006
- Killingsworth (Yep Rock) 2009
- Of Monkees and Men (Yep Rock) 2010
- Dear December (Yep Rock) 2017
- Stroke Manor (Yep Rock) 2019

Tuatara

- Breaking the Ethers (Epic) 1997
- Trading with the Enemy (Fast Horse) 1998
- Cinemathique (Fast Horse) 2002
- The Loading Program (Fast Horse) 2003
- East of the Sun (Fast Horse) 2007
- West of the Moon (Fast Horse) 2007
- The Here and the Gone (Fast Horse) 2008
- Underworld (Sunyata) 2014
- Shamanic Nights (Sunyata) 2016

Robyn Hitchcock and the Venus Three

- Olé! Tarantula (Yep Rock) 2006
- Goodnight Oslo (Yep Rock) 2009
- Propellor Time (Yep Rock) 2010

Tired Pony

- The Place We Ran From (Fiction/Polydor) 2010
- The Ghost of the Mountain (Fiction Records|Fiction/Polydor) 2013

Chuck Prophet

- Night Surfer (Yep Rock) 2014

Nando Reis

- Uma Estrela Misteriosa Revelará o Segredo (Relicário) 2024

The No Ones

- The Great Lost No Ones Album (Yep Rock) 2020
- My Best Evil Friend (Yep Rock) 2023

Slow Music Project

- Live at the Croc 19 Oct 2005 (Slow Music) 2005
