= Linda Pitmon =

American drummer

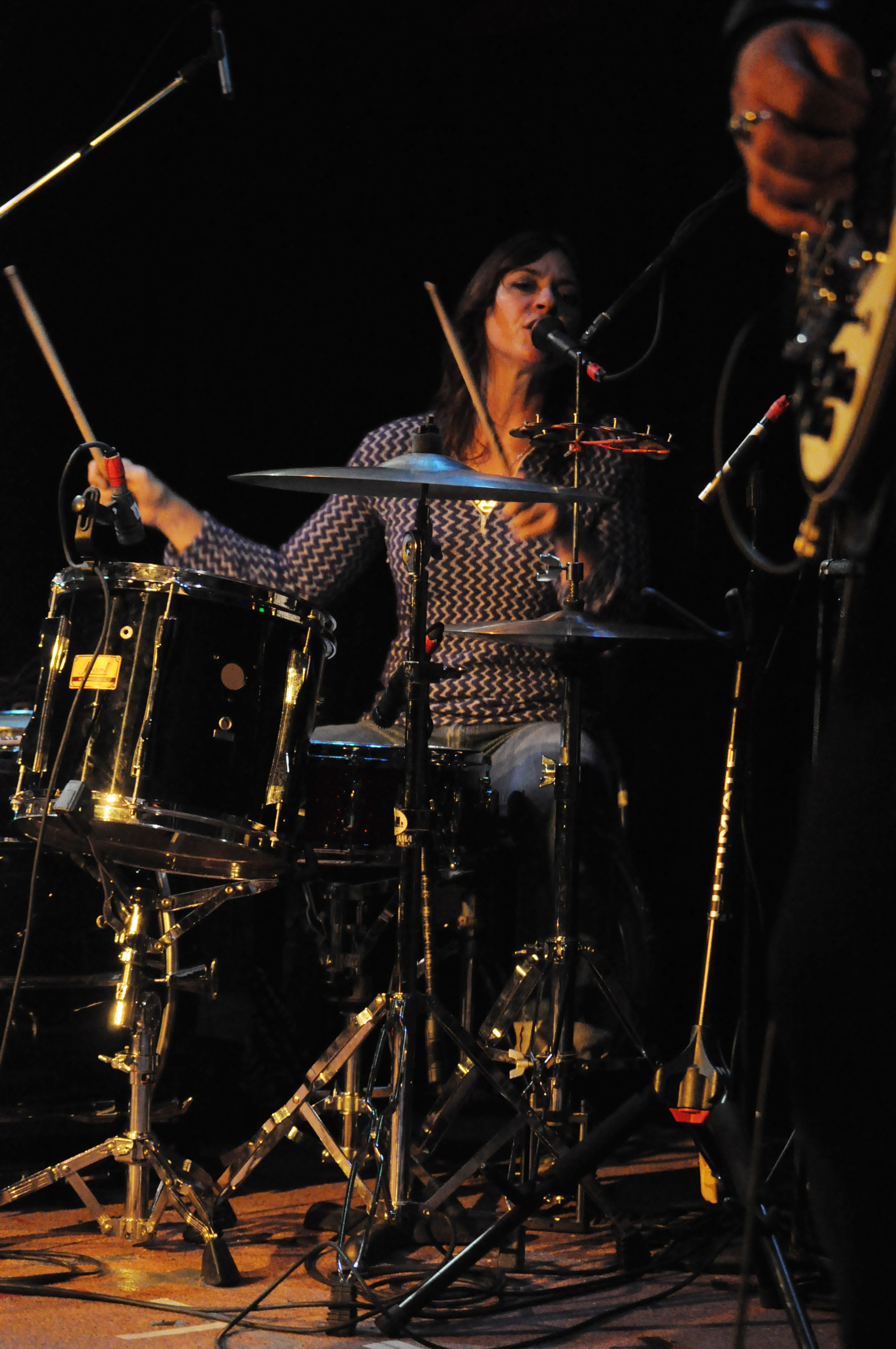
- Pitmon in 2011

Background information
- Occupation: Drummer
- Instruments: Drums; backing vocals
- Member of: The Baseball Project; Filthy Friends; Psycher; the Minus 5; Luke Haines & Peter Buck

Linda Pitmon is an American drummer known for her work with the supergroup the Baseball Project (with Peter Buck and Mike Mills, both members of R.E.M., Scott McCaughey of the Young Fresh Fellows and Steve Wynn of the Dream Syndicate), Steve Wynn & the Miracle 3, Luke Haines & Peter Buck, Filthy Friends (with Corin Tucker of Sleater-Kinney), Zuzu's Petals, the Fauntleroys with Alejandro Escovedo, Ivan Julian, and Nicholas Tremulis, the Minus 5, Golden Smog (with members of the Jayhawks, Soul Asylum, and Wilco) and her transatlantic supergroup Psycher with Cait O'Riordan of the Pogues, Kathy Valentine of the Go-Go's and Brix Smith of the Fall

Pitmon studied drums and percussion in band and orchestra through high school. Her first shows were in 1985 with the Minneapolis band the Funseekers but it wasn't until 1990 when she joined another local band, Zuzu's Petals with her workmates Coleen Elwood and Laurie Lindeen that she got serious about band life. Zuzu's Petals toured the U.S. relentlessly (including a month opening for Adam Ant) and went on to record two records for Restless Records/ Twin/Tone. They were critics darlings in the U.K. press and did two tours of England before they broke up in 1995. She plays vintage Slingerland and Ludwig 4-piece kits." She cites Kenney Jones, Jody Stephens from Big Star, Stan Lynch, and Dave Mattacks, Ringo Starr, Keith Moon, Jaki Liebezeit, Chris Frantz, and Pete Thomas (drummer) as some of her influences.

She has also toured with Alejandro Escovedo and the Burn Something Beautiful Band, Amy Rigby, and Marty Willson-Piper. She's played extensively with Tammy Faye Starlite, John Wesley Harding (singer) and Freedy Johnston and has backed numerous others onstage including John Paul Jones (musician), Paul Westerberg, Semisonic, the Jayhawks, Lee Ranaldo, Michael Cerveris, Suzanne Vega, Willie Nile, Eugene Hütz, Robyn Hitchcock, Kevn Kinney, Chuck Prophet, Howe Gelb, Gerry Leonard, Jamie Perrett, Tony Shanahan, and Jon Langford

During the COVID era, she and her husband Steve Wynn performed thirty shows online from their home and studio, "The Chimp Factory", via Facebook.

== Gear ==
Pitmon has a few vintage drum kits: a 1961 red sparkle Slingerland, a 1976 bicentennial-stripe Ludwig, a '70s-era blue Ludwig Vistalites, and a '60s-era Slingerland set. Her extra Ludwig snares include a '70s-era Acrolite and a 1964 Supraphonic. She uses 20" or 24" vintage Paiste 602 cymbals as well as an 18" Zildjian Kerope, an 18" A. Zildjian & CIE "Vintage" reissue, 15" Paiste Giant Beat hi-hats, and a 16" model from the Cymbal & Gong company. She also uses lightweight single-braced Yamaha stands, a DW 9000 bass drum pedal, Vic Firth 8D woodtip sticks, and Remo Vintage A heads.

== Personal life ==
Pitmon was raised in Minneapolis, Minnesota and began playing on "Tupperware and Tinker Toys" as a three year old. She had early jobs as a record store employee and as a radio DJ. She moved to New York City in 1995 and began touring with and eventually married musician Steve Wynn. They live in Jackson Heights, Queens.
