= Scott McCaughey =

American musician

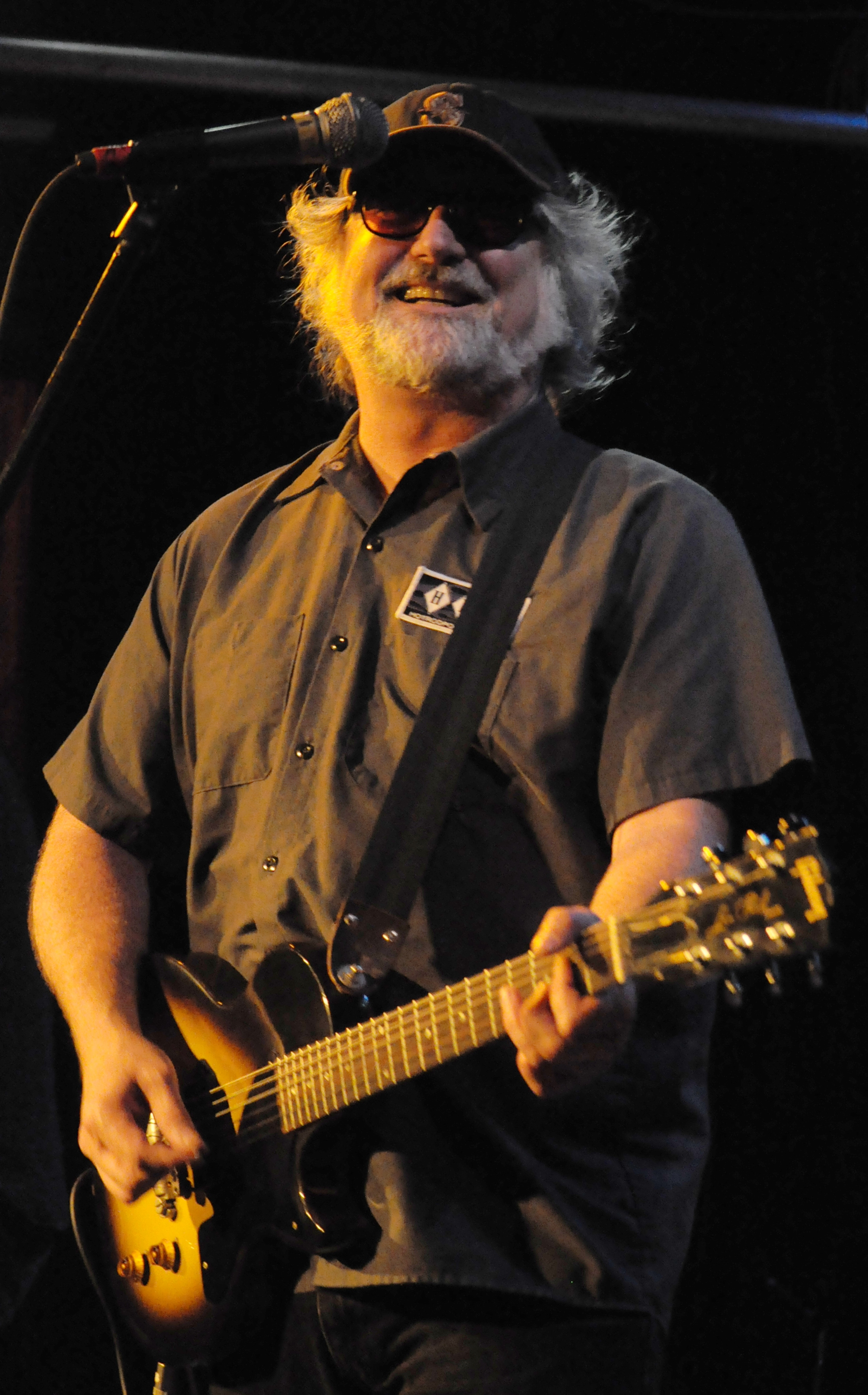
- McCaughey in 2011

Background information
- Genres: Alternative rock
- Occupation: Musician
- Instruments: Guitar; bass; vocals; keyboards

Scott Lewis McCaughey is an American singer, guitarist, and songwriter. He is the leader of The Young Fresh Fellows from Seattle and The Minus 5 based in Portland, Oregon. He was also an auxiliary member of R.E.M., a rock band, from 1994 until they broke up in 2011. He contributed to the studio albums New Adventures in Hi-Fi, Up, Reveal, Around the Sun, Accelerate and Collapse into Now.

== Career ==
=== The Young Fresh Fellows ===
McCaughey began his career with the indie rock band The Young Fresh Fellows. Starting in January 1980, he was also a writer for the Seattle music magazine The Rocket.

=== R.E.M. ===
From 1994 until 2011, McCaughey worked with R.E.M. both on stage and in the studio. "When R.E.M. came to Seattle to work on Automatic for the People, Peter [Buck] called me up. He probably didn't know anybody else in town. We'd go out to eat or have drinks pretty regularly while he was here... then he ended up moving out here. Once he was here, we started playing together a lot, doing all The Minus 5 stuff." McCaughey introduced Buck to his future wife, Stephanie. Buck invited McCaughey to join R.E.M. on their 1995 Monster tour, initially as a second guitarist. "[Peter] said, 'I wouldn't ask you if the Fellows were playing a lot.' But the Fellows were not really doing anything; we'd kind of brought it down to a crawl. I told him, 'Sure, I'd like to try.' I had to audition because I didn't know the rest of the guys as well as Peter."

McCaughey remained with R.E.M. in various capacities until the band's dissolution. He contributed to the studio albums New Adventures in Hi-Fi, Up, Reveal, Around the Sun, Accelerate, and Collapse into Now. Additionally, he has credits for his work on the live albums R.E.M. Live and Live at The Olympia album and their 2003 greatest hits collection, In Time. When working with R.E.M., McCaughey played guitar, bass guitar, keyboards, and sang backing vocals.

=== The Minus 5 and Tuatara ===
R.E.M. members and side musicians formed The Minus 5 and Tuatara in the mid-1990s.

=== Moween ===
In June 2003, McCaughey recorded a song with Moween (Peter Schoemaker/Bram van den Berg), at the IDQ studio in Utrecht, the Netherlands titled "Move On."

=== The Baseball Project ===
In 2008, McCaughey formed the side band The Baseball Project with Buck, Steve Wynn, and Linda Pitmon. The band's first album, Volume 1: Frozen Ropes and Dying Quails was released later in 2008, and their first public appearance was on Late Night with David Letterman. Since then, Mike Mills joined The Baseball Project and they recorded Volume 2: High and Inside, Volume 3: 3rd, and Volume 4: Grand Salami Time (it came out on June 30, 2023 on Omnivore Recordings).

=== The Venus Three ===
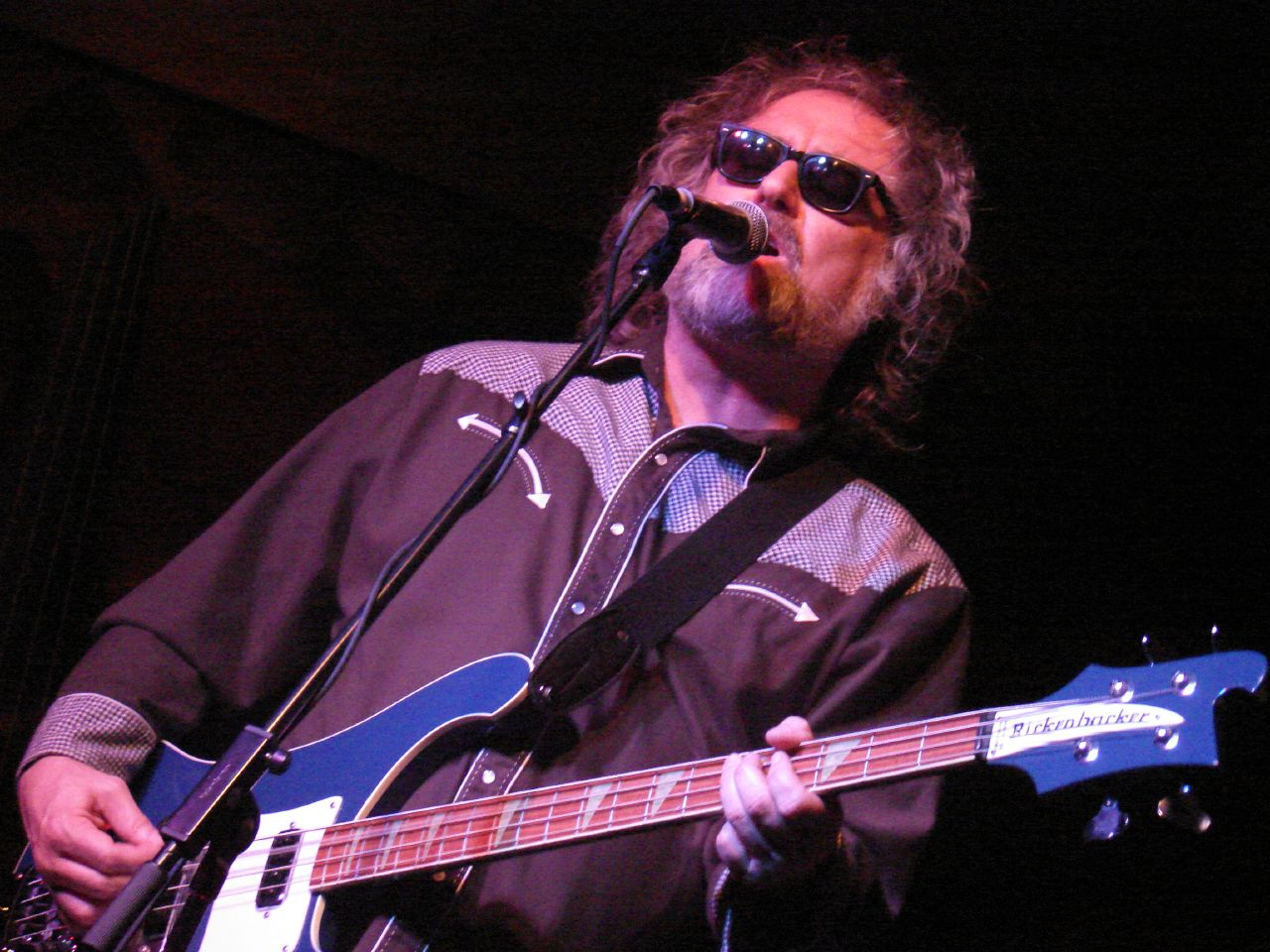
McCaughey performing with the Venus 3 at Ram's Head On Stage in Annapolis, Maryland, March 2007

McCaughey is also the bassist for English singer Robyn Hitchcock's touring band The Venus 3, which has included Bill Rieflin on drums and Peter Buck playing guitar.

=== Tuatara ===
McCaughey plays in Tuatara, an instrumental group which features Buck.

=== The No Ones ===
McCaughey is a member of The No Ones, a jangle pop supergroup. Other members include Buck, Frode Strømstad, and Arne Kjelsrud Mathisen (from I Was A King). Their debut EP The Sun Station (Coastal Town Recordings) features guest appearances by Steve Wynn and Patterson Hood.

== Stroke ==
McCaughey suffered a stroke on November 16, 2017. Two benefit concerts were held in January 2018, to raise money for his medical bills. The artists performing included Peter Buck, Mike Mills, Bill Berry, Alejandro Escovedo, M. Ward, James Mercer of The Shins, Corin Tucker from Sleater-Kinney, the Dharma Bums, the Decemberists, and Patterson Hood. McCaughey recovered substantially from his stroke in 2018, with the help of his wife, Mary Winzig. He began playing a series of well received shows at venues in Portland, Oregon where they live.

== Discography ==
=== Solo releases ===
- 1989: My Chartreuse Opinion (PopLlama Records)
- 2015: Spain Capers (Rock & Roll Inc. / Book) as Scott the Hoople
- 2020: Sad Box and Other Hits as Scott the Hoople
