= When Worlds Collide (Thin White Rope album) =

Studio album by Thin White Rope
- Released: 1994
- Genre: Rock
- Length: 73:07
- Label: Frontier
- Producer: Various

When Worlds Collide is a 1994 compilation album by Thin White Rope. Intended as a "best of" compilation and released after the band's demise, it brings together some highlights from all five studio albums, plus some bonus tracks. The title comes from the lyrics of the song Tina and Glen.

== Track listing ==
1. "Down In The Desert" 3:24 (Kyser/Becker) (From Exploring The Axis)
2. "Valley Of The Bones" 2:54 (Kyser) (From Bottom Feeders)
3. "Moonhead" 4:45 (Kyser/Becker/Kunkel/Tesluk) (From Moonhead)
4. "Elsie Crashed The Party" 3:36 (Kyser) (From In The Spanish Cave)
5. "Red Sun (Original Version)" 2:07 (Kyser) (From Red Sun)
6. "Eleven" 2:23 (Kyser) (From Exploring The Axis)
7. "Ruby Sea" 4:22 (Kyser/Abourezk) (From The Ruby Sea)
8. "Crawl Piss Freeze" 5:34 (Kyser/Tesluk) (From Moonhead)
9. "Tina And Glen" 2:22 (Kyser) (From The Ruby Sea)
10. "Macy's Window" 3:44 (Kyser) (From In The Spanish Cave)
11. "Triangle Song" 4:40 (Kyser/Kunkel/Abourezk) (From Sack Full Of Silver)
12. "Diesel Man" 3:40 (Kyser) (From Sack Full Of Silver)
13. "Some Velvet Morning" 4:40 (Hazlewood) (From Red Sun)
14. "The Napkin Song" 1:28 (Kyser) (From Sack Full Of Silver)
15. "Burn The Flames" 5:30 (Erickson) (From Where the Pyramid Meets the Eye)
16. "Fish Song" 3:53 (Kyser) (From The Ruby Sea)
