= Under the Blue Marlin =

Studio album by Naked Prey
- Released: 1986
- Genre: Rock 'n' roll
- Label: Frontier
- Producer: Paul Cutler

Naked Prey chronology
Naked Prey (1984)	Under the Blue Marlin (1986)	40 Miles from Nowhere (1987)

Under the Blue Marlin is the second album by the American band Naked Prey, released in 1986. They supported it by touring with Frontier Records labelmates the Pontiac Brothers and Thin White Rope on The Good, the Bad, and the Ugly Tour, sponsored by Spin.

== Production ==
The album was produced by Paul Cutler. The drummer Tommy Larkins joined the band prior to the recording sessions. Frontman Van Christian decided to use less first-person narration in his lyrics, although the band struggled to finish enough songs for the sessions. "Dirt" is a cover of the Stooges song.

== Critical reception ==
Professional ratings
Review scores
Source	Rating
AllMusic	2/5 stars
The Daily Illini	4/5 stars
The Encyclopedia of Popular Music	3/5 stars
The Great Indie Discography	7/10

LA Weekly said that "'dirty' and 'raw' are the operative terms here, but the product's well-assembled". The Rocket called the album "bluesy 'n brawlin' 'n rockin' 'n ravin'". The Daily Illini praised the rock 'n' roll and concluded that Naked Prey "listened to too many early Slash records". Spin noted that Christian is not "hopping a freight bound for Cougarville or anything, but Naked Prey's second long-player has a high consumability quotient."

Martin C. Strong called the music "galloping desert-rock fusing Neil Young & Crazy Horse-esque dirty guitar solos with sun-parched, whiskey-throated vocals". The Trouser Press Record Guide opined that "Christian's colorful singing and [David] Seger's guitar work remain the group's virtues, as Prey's songs don't make much of an impression." In 2001, Magnet stated that the album shared musical characteristics with the 1980s Paisley Underground sound.

== Track listing ==
No.	Title	Length
1.	"The Ride"
2.	"A Stranger (Never Says Goodbye)"
3.	"Dirt"
4.	"Train Whistle"
5.	"How I Felt That Day"
6.	"Come On Down"
7.	"Rawhead"
8.	"Voodoo Godhead"
9.	"Fly Away"
10.	"What Price for Freedom"
