= Shut Up, It's Christmas =

EP by Suddenly, Tammy!
- Released: December 1995
- Genre: Indie pop, Christmas music
- Length: 21:27
- Label: Warner Bros.
- Producer: Suddenly, Tammy!

Shut Up, It's Christmas is a promo-only EP released by Suddenly, Tammy! in 1995.

== Track listing ==
1. "There in My Head"
2. "Linus and Lucy"
3. "Plant The Halls"
4. "Snowman"
5. "Whole Lotta Girl"
6. "Merry"
7. "Rock'n'Roll Santa Claus"

== Notes ==
- "Plant The Halls" is an adaptation of the song "Plant Me" from the 1993 album Suddenly, Tammy!; singer Beth Sorrentino lays the lyrics of "Deck the Halls" over "Plant Me" instrumentation.
- "Snowman" is a 1989 demo version, not the version that appears on (We Get There When We Do.).
- "Whole Lotta Girl" is a 1993 demo version of a song later released on the album Comet.
- "Merry" was later released on Comet.
