= Eccsame the Photon Band =

Studio album by Lilys
- Released: December 1994
- Recorded: Studio 45, Hartford, Connecticut, 1994
- Genre: Dream pop, space rock
- Label: spinART, Frontier
- Producer: Kurt Heasley, Rich Costey

Lilys chronology
A Brief History of Amazing Letdowns (1994)	Eccsame the Photon Band (1994)	Better Can't Make Your Life Better (1996)

Eccsame the Photon Band is the second album by the American indie rock band Lilys, released in 1994 on the spinART label. The album saw the band move towards dream pop. The notoriously nomadic Kurt Heasley refers to this period of Lilys history as EPOCH I, also included is his first seven-inch single " February Fourteenth", the mini LP A Brief History of Amazing Letdowns and Lilys' first full-length album, In The Presence of Nothing. Eccsame the Photon Band was recorded at Mike Deming's Studio 45 in Hartford, Connecticut, largely as duo of Heasley and Harold Evans (of the band Poole).

This album marks Kurt Heasley's Lilys shift to a slower, moodier, and more spaced-out sound. "I went closest to what my 23 year-old brain could stand with Eccsame— to the edge of my own mortality and sanity", Heasley says. "as far as the period, the energy, the zeitgeist of what we were intending, that was the only time we ever did it."

While Lilys' musical style and approach shifts continually, the early recordings, the debut album In the Presence of Nothing and Eccsame the Photon Band were strongly influenced by My Bloody Valentine. The first seven-inch single “February Fourteenth,” released on Slumberland in 1991, even gives direct tribute to their impact. My Bloody Valentine frontman Kevin Shields is a huge fan of Heasley’s work, and in his book on MBV's Loveless for Continuum’s 33 1/3 series, writer Mike McGonigal called Lilys “the only post-MBV ‘shoegaze’ band that mattered."

Producer, Rich Costey helped to create the album's iconic textures. Interviewed on the history of Eccsame by Edward Charlton of Clicky Clicky Music, Costey explains: "The drum sound was a combination of several things: the hard, open space that the live room at Studio .45 presented...and also the minimal and incredibly powerful, tasteful playing of Harry Evans. Listening to it today, it seems a study in how a drummer should play to the sound presented to him or her, as opposed to the other way around."

Out of print for over twenty years, a remastered vinyl version is being re-issued through Frontier Records . This 21st anniversary re-release includes original artwork and has an enhanced dynamic range with the reordering of songs. "The Hermit Crab" has been moved and now begins side two, allowing for a deeper cut of side one, and allowing increased audio fidelity.

== Critical reception ==
Professional ratings
Review scores
Source	Rating
AllMusic	4/5 stars

The album was described as "one of the Lilys' best" by Jason Ankeny, writing for AllMusic. It was described as "a hallucinatory revelation" by Marc Hogan of Pitchfork Media. Comparing it with the band's previous album, Douglas Wolk, writing for Trouser Press, called it "a much crazier record, and a much quieter one". Andrew Unterberger of Stylus Magazine stated that the album was "not influenced by shoegazing as a genre, but rather as a principle", calling it "a masterpiece of mood, atmosphere and production." Andrea Moed of CMJ New Music Monthly stated that on the album Heasley "sounds like David Gilmour's slightly less evil twin, numb but not quite comfortable".

"The obscurely titled, Eccsame the Photon Band, is the Lilys' detour into spartan dream-pop," describes AllMusic, "Kurt Heasley's soft, distanced voice is ideally suited to the coldly atmospheric textures of tracks like the languorous opener "High Writer at Home" and the narcotically catchy 'The Hermit Crab', the album is still one of the Lilys' best."

== Track listing ==
1. "High Writer at Home" - 5:53
2. (untitled) - 0:12
3. "Day of the Monkey" - 3:49
4. "FBI and Their Toronto Transmitters" - 3:36
5. (untitled) - 0:18
6. "The Turtle Which Died Before Knowing" - 7:56
7. "The Hermit Crab" - 3:34
8. (untitled) - 0:16
9. "Overlit Canyon (The Obscured Wingtip Memoir)" - 5:15
10. "Hubble" - 6:06
11. "Kodiak (Reprise)" - 0:49
12. "Radiotricity" - 3:41
13. "Your Guest and Host" - 4:40
14. (untitled) - 4:54

== Personnel ==
- Kurt Heasley - guitar, vocals, bass guitar, organ, synthesizers, vibraphone
- Harold "Bear" Evans - drums, percussion, bass guitar, vibraphone, vocals
- Michael Deming - organ, vibraphone, bass, tone cluster
- Rich Costey - loops, synthesizer
- Robert Andreano - french horn, flugelhorn, cello, slide guitar
- Dave Frank - drums
