= Zero population growth (disambiguation) =

Zero population growth may refer to:

- Zero population growth, demographic balance (stable population size)
- Zero Population Growth, former name of the organisation Population Connection
- Z.P.G., a 1972 Danish-American dystopian science fiction film
- Zero Population Growth: Bliss Out Volume 15, a music album

== See also ==
- ZPG (disambiguation)
