= Prozac Nation (film) =

2001 film by Erik Skjoldbjærg

- Promotional poster
- Directed by: Erik Skjoldbjærg
- Screenplay by: Frank Deasy; Larry Gross
- Adaptation by: Galt Niederhoffer
- Based on: Prozac Nation by Elizabeth Wurtzel
- Produced by: Galt Niederhoffer; Brad Weston; R. Paul Miller
- Starring: Christina Ricci; Jason Biggs; Anne Heche; Michelle Williams; Jonathan Rhys Meyers; Jessica Lange
- Cinematography: Erling Thurmann-Andersen
- Edited by: James Lyons
- Music by: Nathan Larson
- Production companies: Millennium Films; Cinerenta
- Distributed by: Miramax Films
- Release dates: September 8, 2001 (TIFF); March 19, 2005 (United States)
- Running time: 95 minutes
- Countries: United States; Germany
- Language: English
- Budget: $9 million
- Box office: $129,364

Prozac Nation is a 2001 psychological drama film directed by Erik Skjoldbjærg, starring Christina Ricci, Jason Biggs, Anne Heche, Michelle Williams, Jonathan Rhys Meyers, and Jessica Lange. It is based on Elizabeth Wurtzel's 1994 memoir of the same name, which describes Wurtzel's experiences with atypical depression. That book helped to change the view of Americans on mental illness. The title is a reference to Prozac, the brand name of an antidepressant she was prescribed.

== Plot ==
In 1986, Elizabeth "Lizzie" Wurtzel is a 19-year-old accepted into Harvard with a scholarship in journalism. She has been raised by her divorced mother since she was two years old and has not seen her father at all in the last four years. Despite his lack of interest and involvement, Lizzie still misses her father, a contributing factor to her depression. Through a series of flashbacks, it is clear that there was a total communication breakdown between Lizzie's parents, which is soon reflected in Lizzie's own relationship with her mother, Lynne.

Soon after arriving at Harvard, Lizzie decides to lose her virginity to an older student, Noah. Lizzie proceeds to alienate Noah by throwing a loss-of-virginity party immediately afterwards with the help of her roommate Ruby. Although she and Lizzie begin as best friends, Ruby soon becomes another casualty of Lizzie's instability. Although Lizzie's article for the local music column in The Harvard Crimson earns her an award from Rolling Stone early into the semester, she soon finds herself unable to write, stuck in a vicious cycle with substance abuse.

Lizzie's promising literary career is at risk, as is her mental and physical health. Lynne sends her to expensive psychiatric sessions with Dr. Sterling towards which her father, pleading poverty, implacably refuses to contribute anything. She begins a relationship with another student, Rafe, but struggles with trust issues and fears of abandonment. During the holiday break, she visits his home in Texas. Upon discovering that his sister is severely autistic, Lizzie accuses Rafe of being "a creepy voyeur" who gets off on witnessing the pain of others. Rafe breaks up with her.

Dr. Sterling prescribes Lizzie medication to cope with her spiraling depression following her breakup. Meanwhile, Lynne is hospitalized after a violent mugging. Lizzie helps take care of her, and a relationship of honesty, accountability, and mutual support develops between them. After a long period of treatment under medication and a suicidal gesture, Lizzie stabilizes and begins to adjust to her life.

== Cast ==
- Christina Ricci as Elizabeth Wurtzel
  - Zoe Miller as Young Elizabeth Wurtzel
- Jason Biggs as Rafe
- Anne Heche as Dr. Sterling
- Michelle Williams as Ruby
- Jonathan Rhys Meyers as Noah
- Jessica Lange as Lynne Wurtzel
- Nicholas Campbell as Donald Wurtzel
- Lou Reed as Himself
- Jesse Moss as Sam
- Sheila Paterson as Elizabeth's Grandmother

== Release ==
Prozac Nation had its world premiere at the Toronto International Film Festival on September 8, 2001 (three days before the September 11 attacks); That same month, Miramax Films acquired the distribution rights for the United States, United Kingdom, Ireland and Italy, with the intent of giving the film a wider theatrical release later in 2002. Months of subsequent test screenings and re-edits of the film never led to a broad commercial release. It was released in Norway, Skjoldbjærg's native country, on August 22, 2003. The film was never given a theatrical release in the United States, where it instead premiered on the Starz! channel on March 19, 2005, and was released on DVD on July 5, 2005.

Frank Deasy, who co-wrote the screenplay, offered his opinion to The Guardian on Miramax's failure to release the film:

It's a truthful depiction of depression. And I think the reason Miramax has struggled is the fact that it doesn't have a traditional dramatic structure, in terms of a clear, unqualified ending. Look at the book: Elizabeth is very clear that Prozac has helped her, but you're left with a dilemma, because perhaps she no longer knows who she is. We didn't want to come down heavily on one side or the other. People who've experienced depression like that aspect of the film, but a lot of people don't like it. Miramax certainly don't seem to like it.

== Reception ==
The film received a generally negative reception upon release. It currently holds a 29 percent rating on Rotten Tomatoes, based on 24 reviews. Todd McCarthy of Variety felt it had a "precise visual style" and that Ricci gave a "smart performance", but criticised some of the editing choices and its overall inability to explore the nuances of depression. In a similarly mixed review, Slant Magazine's Ed Gonzalez felt the visuals were "contrived" and owed more to films like Requiem for a Dream than to director Skjoldbjærg's own vision, but said of Ricci, "[she's] splendid when the atomic bomb inside her character's head goes off", further commending her chemistry with co-star Lange.

== Soundtrack ==
What follows is a list of the songs that were played according to the end credits.

1. "The Promise" – Bruce Springsteen
2. "Mystery Achievement" – The Pretenders
3. "I Will Dare" – The Replacements
4. "Perfect Day" – Lou Reed
5. "Sweet Jane" – Lou Reed
6. "Keep the Promise" – The Pontiac Brothers
7. "Ivory Tower" – The Long Ryders
8. "Who Is Who" – Adolescents
9. "The Real West" – Thin White Rope
10. "Das Testament des Dr. Mabuse" – Propaganda
