= Naked Prey (disambiguation) =

Naked Prey is an American rock band from Arizona.

Naked Prey or The Naked Prey may also refer to:

- Naked Prey (album), the band's 1984 debut album
- The Naked Prey, a 1965 survival film

- The Naked Prey (album), the 1966 soundtrack for the film
- Cornel Wilde's The Naked Prey, the 2004 CD release of the soundtrack

- Naked Prey (novel), a 2003 novel in John Sandford's Prey series
- Shabütie (Nguni word meaning "naked prey"), former name of Coheed and Cambria, an American rock band from New York
- Hitch-Hike (film), a 1977 Italian crime film
- "Bar Wars VII: The Naked Prey", an episode of the American television sitcom Cheers
