= The 3 Way =

Studio album by Lilys
- Released: 1999
- Genre: Indie rock
- Length: 36:16
- Label: Sire Records
- Producer: Michael Deming

Lilys chronology
Better Can't Make Your Life Better (1996)	The 3 Way (1999)	Zero Population Growth: Bliss Out Volume 15 (1999)

Professional ratings
Review scores
Source	Rating
Allmusic	4.5/5 stars
Entertainment Weekly	(C+)
Nashville Scene	(favorable)
Pitchfork Media	(8.6/10)
Rolling Stone	2.5/5 stars

The 3 Way is a 1999 album by the American indie rock band, Lilys.

The album continued Lilys leader Kurt Heasley's 1960s rock influence, with Pitchfork Media's Michael Sandlin stating "Heasley's ransacking encompasses almost the entire stylistic sprawl of the '60s on the groove- a- minute shindig that is The 3-Way," with the influence of The Kinks strongly in evidence.

== Track listing ==
1. "Dimes Make Dollars" – 2:24
2. "Socs Hip" – 7:12
3. "Accepting Applications at University" – 2:51
4. "And One (on One)" – 4:06
5. "Leo Ryan (Our Pharoah's Slave)" – 7:17
6. "Solar Is Here" – 1:42
7. "The Spirits Merchant" – 4:27
8. "The Lost Victory" – 1:42
9. "The Generator" – 2:16
10. "A Tab for the Holiday" – 2:15

== Personnel ==
Kurt Heasley, Michael Deming, Torben Pastore, Aaron Sperske, and David Shuman
