= In the Presence of Nothing =

Studio album by Lilys
- Released: September 1992
- Genre: Shoegaze
- Length: 54:10
- Label: Slumberland; SpinART
- Producer: Jay Sorrentino; Ken Heitmueller

Lilys chronology
In the Presence of Nothing (1992)	A Brief History of Amazing Letdowns (1994)

Professional ratings
Review scores
Source	Rating
AllMusic	3.5/5 stars
Select	3/5

In the Presence of Nothing is the debut studio album by American indie rock band Lilys, co-released in 1992 by Slumberland Records and SpinART. The album was written and recorded in Lancaster, Pennsylvania.

The album's title is a dig at Velvet Crush, who released In the Presence of Greatness the previous year. The album features Lilys frontman Kurt Heasley backed by members of Velocity Girl, the Ropers and Suddenly, Tammy!. The band's early My Bloody Valentine influence is strongly evident, with Jason Ankeny of AllMusic even going as far as calling the album "the quick follow-up to Loveless that My Bloody Valentine never made", and Douglas Wolk of Trouser Press calling it "even more a product of hero-worship". Ankeny also called the album "a wonderful testament to shoegazing's brief but seminal moment in the sun."

== Track listing ==
All songs written by Lilys.

1. "There's No Such Thing as Black Orchids" – 5:14
2. "Elizabeth Colour Wheel" – 6:58
3. "Collider" – 4:20
4. "Tone Bender" – 3:16
5. "Periscope" – 5:14
6. "It Does Nothing for Me" – 4:08
7. "Snowblinder" – 4:34
8. "The Way Snowflakes Fall" – 12:09
9. "Threw a Day" – 3:44
10. "Claire Hates Me" – 4:33

== Personnel ==
- Kurt Heasley – guitar, vocals
- Archie Moore – guitar
- Harold "Bear" Evans – drums
- Mike Hammel – drums
- Ken Heitmueller – backing vocals
- Beth Sorrentino – backing vocals
- Jay Sorrentino – backing vocals
