= Moonhead (disambiguation) =

Moonhead is a 1987 album by Thin White Rope.

Moonhead may also refer to:

== People ==
- Claude Kelly, singer-songwriter, in reference to the lyrics of "Price Tag"
- John Wilson (Caddo) (ca. 1845–1901), a Caddo-Delaware peyote roadman

== Music ==
- "Moonhead" (song), a song by Pink Floyd
