= Fuzzy Little Piece of the World =

Studio album by the Pontiac Brothers
- Released: 1992
- Studio: The Sound Factory
- Label: Frontier
- Producers: Paul du Gré, the Pontiac Brothers

The Pontiac Brothers chronology
Johnson (1988)	Fuzzy Little Piece of the World (1992)

Fuzzy Little Piece of the World is an album by the American band the Pontiac Brothers, released in 1992. A one-time reunion album, the band recorded it because they missed playing together. They supported the album with a North American tour.

== Production ==
The album was produced by Paul du Gré and the band. Fuzzy Little Piece of the World was put together in a month, with recording taking place over six days in July 1992. "Liberace's Dead" is a tribute to Liberace.

== Critical reception ==
Professional ratings
Review scores
Source	Rating
AllMusic	3/5 stars
Los Angeles Times	3.5/4 stars

Trouser Press wrote that, "though apparently conceived as a casual one-off, the album retains the balance of beery abandon and wounded introspection that originally made the band special, while maintaining the requisite level of tunefulness on numbers like 'Cry' and 'Clowns Join the Circus'." Rolling Stone called Fuzzy Little Piece of the World "an album of bittersweet celebration, one that evinces an absurdist's sense of camaraderie through minor gems such as 'Suicide Note' and 'Clowns Join the Circus'."

The Los Angeles Times concluded that the album "comes across as a now-raucous, now-sentimental Irish wake for a dead rock band, in which the four guys who are supposed to be in the coffin get to enjoy the delicious privilege of popping out of the box to drain a few drams and lead the festivities of mourning"; the paper later deemed it one of the 25 best Orange County albums of the 1990s. The St. Petersburg Times determined that "the unit is not as Stonesy or bluesy as before."

AllMusic wrote that "the overall tone is, surprisingly enough, sentimental—friendship is a recurring theme on this album, and on the closing I-miss-my-buddies number, 'Being with You', you almost imagine someone would burst into tears if not for being all drunk and giggly."

== Track listing ==
No.	Title	Length
1.	"Cry"
2.	"Clowns Join the Circus"
3.	"Hard to Tell"
4.	"Rock Music"
5.	"Suicide Note"
6.	"Rockabilly Revolution #9"
7.	"Feelgood"
8.	"Fuzzy Little Piece of the World"
9.	"Little Big Man"
10.	"Last Saturday"
11.	"Liberace's Dead"
12.	"Little by Little"
13.	"Being with You"
