= Better Can't Make Your Life Better =

Studio album by Lilys
- Released: 1996
- Genre: Indie rock
- Length: 37:06
- Label: Ché Trading Limited; Primary Recordings/Elektra
- Producer: Michael Deming

Lilys chronology
Eccsame the Photon Band (1995)	Better Can't Make Your Life Better (1996)	The 3 Way (1999)

Better Can't Make Your Life Better is the fourth studio album by the American indie rock band Lilys, released in 1996.

== Recording ==
The album was recorded for the British label Ché and picked up by Elektra Records subsidiary Primary for release in the US. The album originally had a budget of $8,000, but this needed to be more than doubled to $17,000, with the projected studio time of one month extended to two. Battles with the label over finance led to several compromises; Lilys leader Kurt Heasley had originally planned the album to sound "like Badfinger backed by the London Philharmonic Orchestra", and a big band had been planned but was replaced by xylophone and trumpet players, with samples of clarinet and bassoon added later, and by the end of the recordings Heasley claimed to have been a nervous wreck and 50 pounds underweight from eating only garlic.

== Critical reception ==
Professional ratings
Review scores
Source	Rating
AllMusic	4/5 stars
The Guardian	4/5 stars
NME	8/10

Mark Jenkins of The Washington Post described the album as "remarkably seamless" and "assembled from shards of mid-'60s rock". Jason Ankeny, writing for AllMusic, described the album's sound as "the Lilys hop into the time machine and travel back to the mid-'60s, immersing themselves in the style of the British Invasion." Neil Gladstone, writing for CMJ New Music Monthly, identified the Kinks, the Monkees and the Zombies as influences on the album. Robert Hickey, writing for PopMatters, called it "a great CD, sounding like something the Kinks would have made had Ray Davies embraced psychedelia instead of taking up charter membership in the Village Green Preservation Society." Tom Cox of The Guardian gave the album four stars, calling it "an album of scrambled, dreamstate intellect and endless hooks...like The Byrds getting high and beating up The Monkees on fast forward."

== Singles ==
"Returns Every Morning" was the first single taken from the album, released in April 1996. "A Nanny In Manhattan" was first released as a single in November 1996 on 7-inch vinyl only. It was used in a Roman Coppola-directed ad for Levi's prompting its re-release (with new sleeve art and B-sides) in February 1998 and it became a hit on the UK Singles Chart, reaching #16, the band's only major hit single.

== Track listing ==
1. "Cambridge California" – 2:16
2. "A Nanny in Manhattan" – 1:58
3. "Shovel into Spade Kit" – 3:47
4. "Elevator Is Temporary" – 2:29
5. "Can't Make Your Life Better" – 4:23
6. "Who Is Moving" – 3:01
7. "The Tennis System (and Its Stars)" – 5:04
8. "Paz en el Hogar" – 3:34
9. "Bring Up the Stamp" – 3:59
10. "The Sammael Sea" - 3:06
11. "Returns Every Morning" - 3:22

== Personnel ==
- Kurt Heasley - guitar, vocals
- Michael Deming - bass guitar
- Thom Monahan - bass guitar, vocals
- Aaron Sperske - drums, percussion
- David Shuman - bass guitar
