= A Brief History of Amazing Letdowns =

Studio album by Lilys
- Released: March 1994
- Genre: Power pop, indie rock
- Length: 22.03
- Label: SpinART, Frontier Records

Lilys chronology
In the Presence of Nothing (1992)	A Brief History of Amazing Letdowns (1994)	Eccsame the Photon Band (1995)

A Brief History of Amazing Letdowns is a 1994 mini-album by the American indie rock band, Lilys, released on the SpinART label on 10-inch vinyl and CD. The lead track, "Ginger", was used in a CK1 commercial. The album was issued in the UK in 1998. The album saw the band make their first major stylistic shift; The early My Bloody Valentine-influenced sound had given way to what Trouser Press described as "pleasant, straightforward guitar pop".

== Critical reception ==
Professional ratings
Review scores
Source	Rating
Allmusic	4/5 stars

Tim DiGravina of Allmusic described the mini-album as "a brief mini-album of amazing songs" and gave it a four-star review. He described it as "an essential release for fans of the Lilys and indie fans in general," going on to state "If music could define words, the first five songs here would be a pop/rock definition for the word beautiful." Trouser Press writer Douglas Wolk described "Any Place I've Lived" as "the best melody Heasley's written to date".

== Track listing ==
=== CD Version ===
All tracks are written by Lilys.

No.	Title	Length
1.	"Ginger"	5:34
2.	"Ycjcyaqftj"	1:40
3.	"Any Place I've Lived"	1:58
4.	"Jenny, Andrew and Me"	4:09
5.	"Dandy"	4:52
6.	"Evel Knievel"	3:58

=== 10" Vinyl Version ===
Side A
No.	Title	Length
1.	"Ginger"
2.	"Ycjcyaqftj"
3.	"Any Place I've Lived"

Side B
No.	Title	Length
1.	"Dandy"
2.	"Glosseder"
3.	"Jenny, Andrew and Me"

=== 2021 Reissue 12" Vinyl Version ===
Side A
No.	Title	Length
1.	"Ginger"
2.	"Ycjcyaqftj"
3.	"Any Place I've Lived"
4.	"Jenny, Andrew & Me"
5.	"Dandy"
6.	"G. Cobalt Franklin"

Side B
No.	Title	Length
1.	"Elsa"
2.	"Coby"
3.	"Timber"
4.	"Hymn"

== Personnel ==
- Kurt Heasley – guitar, vocals
- Harold "Bear" Evans – drums
- Paul "Pablo" Naomi – bass guitar

- Adam Lasus - engineering, production, mixing
