= Danger Zone (EP) =

EP by China White
- Released: 1981
- Studio: Redondo Pacific
- Genre: Hardcore punk; punk rock
- Length: 19:31
- Label: Frontier
- Producer: Mike Patton; Thom Wilson

China White chronology
Danger Zone (1981)	Addiction (1995)

Danger Zone is the debut EP by the American hardcore punk band China White.

A longer early version of the title track, "Dangerzone", recorded in June 1980, would be later released as "Danger Zone" on the 1983 New Underground Records compilation album Life Is Beautiful So Why Not Eat Health Foods? (Note: New Underground Records #NU-44)

== Production and release ==
Record producer by Mike Patton (Note: Mike Patton was the bassist of the punk rock band Middle Class. Not to be confused with the lead singer of the alternative metal band Faith No More.) and Thom Wilson, Danger Zone was recorded at Redondo Pacific Studios in Redondo Beach, California.

The EP was released by Frontier Records in 1981 on 12-inch vinyl disc. (Note: Frontier #FLP 1005).

== Cover art ==
The photo on the front cover, portraying a murder scene, was taken by Southern Californian punk photographer Edward Colver.

"The most interesting attribute of 1981's Dangerzone 12" ... was its Edward Colver cover shot of a murder scene he came across after a Fear show, using the available light of a police car."

— Steven Blush, author of American Hardcore: A Tribal History

The band members photographs on the back cover were taken by Glen E. Friedman, another American photographer.

== Critical reception ==
Charles P. Lamey of Trouser Press was of the view that:

"China White ... was an early force on the California beach-punk scene. These six songs show them to be a solid hardcore unit, playing loud, fast and spirited, lacking only distinctiveness."

== Reissues ==
In 1996, Danger Zone was re-released on a split CD (Note: Frontier #FLP 31005-2) shared with the Flyboys' self-titled EP from 1980. (Note: Frontier #FLP 1001)

In 2013, Frontier, in collaboration with Burger Records, reissued the original EP as a 300-copy limited edition, hand-numbered cassette. (Note: Burger #BRGR354)

== Track listing ==
All tracks are written by Frank Ruffino and Marc Martin, except where noted.

Side A
No.	Title	Length
1.	"Dangerzone"	2:30
2.	"Live in Your Eyes"	3:43
3.	"Addiction"	4:06

Side B
No.	Title	Lyrics/Music	Length
1.	"Daddy's Little Queen" (The Outsiders (Note: Frank Ruffino's first band, the Outsiders (originally named the Fucked), from the small Surfside community in Seal Beach, were part of the first wave of Orange County punk rock.) cover)	The Outsiders	2:35
2.	"Anthem"		2:29
3.	"Nightlife"		4:08
Total length:			19:31

== Personnel ==
China White

- Marc Martin (name misspelled as Mark) – vocals
- Frank Ruffino (surname misspelled as Raffino) – guitar
- James Rodriguez – bass
- Joey Ruffino (surname misspelled as Raffino) – drums

Production

- Mike Patton – Record producer
- Thom Wilson – production
- Diane Zincavage – graphic design
- Edward C. Colver – photography (front cover)
- Glen E. Friedman – photography (back cover)
