= China White (band) =

American hardcore punk band

- China White in 1981. From left to right: Frank Ruffino, James Rodriguez, Marc Martin, Joey Ruffino.

Background information
- Origin: Huntington Beach, California, U.S.
- Genres: Hardcore punk, punk rock
- Years active: 1979–2013
- Labels: Frontier, Lethal Records, Malt Soda Recordings
- Members: Frank Ruffino †; Scott Sisunik; Marc Martin; James Rodriguez; Richard Katchadoorian; Joey Ruffino; Vince Mesa; Corey Stretz; Steven Barrios; Jeff Porter; James Lugo

China White was an influential hardcore punk band from Huntington Beach, California, best known for their EP Danger Zone. They were, along with The Crowd, Adolescents, Social Distortion, T.S.O.L. and Shattered Faith, the prominent figures of the early Orange County punk scene. In 1982, photographer Glen E. Friedman wrote: "Full doses of China White will send staggering chills through your veins as you experience this nitro-punk injection."

== History ==
In the late 1970s, Huntington Beach was seeing a surge in punk rock, with nine bands creating a specific 'beach punk' sound: The Outsiders, The Slashers, The Crowd, The Voyeurs, The Klan, The Screwz, The Idols, the Non-Fascists and Fourth Reich. These bands had an aggressive or violent approach; they and their growing fan base were facing push-back from the Hippie movement and the Jock scene. Street violence was increasing, bands were competing for domination in the mosh pits and Huntington Beach was gaining a reputation for street violence.

Within this atmosphere, guitarist Frank Ruffino formed China White, naming the band after the drug China white and the Johnny Thunders and The Heartbreakers song Chinese Rocks. The band's logo was inspired by an image seen in a 1964 episode of The Twilight Zone.

Alien symbol from The Twilight Zone episode "Black Leather Jackets".

Ruffino recruited singer Scott Sisunik, guitarist Marc Martin, bassist James Rodriguez and drummer Richard "Skitchblade" Katchadoorian. Within a year, Sisunik had left to form the band Social Task; Katchadoorian to join the band Shattered Faith. Martin took over as vocalist and drummer Vince Mesa joined the band. A few months later, he would leave to join The Vandals and was replaced by Ruffino's older brother, drummer Joey Ruffino.

The band made its mark on both the O.C. and L.A. club circuits and, in 1981, was signed to Frontier Records. In 1981, they released the EP, Danger Zone, whose cover was a murder scene photographed by Edward Colver. (In the EPs credits, Frank and Joey's name was incorrectly spelled 'Raffino'; Marc Martin was identified as 'Mark' Martin and, elsewhere, as 'Mike' Martin.)

In 1981, their songs "Criminal" and "Solid State" were included on the New Underground Records' compilation Life Is Ugly So Why Not Kill Yourself; in 1982, New Underground included the song "Danger Zone" on the compilation Life Is Beautiful So Why Not Eat Health Foods.

In 1983, Martin, Rodriguez and Joey Ruffino quit the band. Frank Ruffino joined a band called Radio Head (not the English band Radiohead), and recorded one album. In 1984, Ruffino revived China White. He brought back Sisunik as vocalist. Corey Stretz joined on bass and Steven "Spanky" Barrios became the drummer. After a show at the Olympic Auditorium in 1985, they disbanded.

The band resurfaced in 1993 and, in 1995, recorded China White's first full-length album, Addiction, with Stretz, Jeff Porter on vocals and drummer James Lugo. The Los Angeles Times reviewer called the album "soulless and tired" and "a lame stroll down memory lane". The band played some gigs on the West Coast but disbanded a few months after the release of Addiction.

In 2002, Martin, Rodriguez and the Ruffino brothers reappeared for a reunion tour. They released two albums on Malt Soda Recordings: the limited edition Live Cheap CD, which is clips from concerts and, in 2006, Addiction.2, a re-release of their Addiction material plus two new 1997 studio tracks and ten live songs from a 2003 show.

In 2009, Frank Ruffino was diagnosed with Liver failure, the result of years of hard drinking and drug abuse. By 2013, he was suffering from Cirrhosis and needed a liver transplant.

Vans Warped Tour founder Kevin Lyman created the Unite the United Foundation to raise money for Ruffino's medical expenses. Members of Pearl Jam, The Stooges, Social Distortion, Bad Religion, Black Flag, Slayer, Motörhead and Rancid, among others, donated signed guitars and memorabilia for an online auction that began on April 20. There was a viewing party at the Los Angeles Punk Rock Museum on April 14 and another in Huntington Beach on April 20. On March 20, members of China White and The Crowd, plus Cadillac Tramps, and The Stitches played a benefit concert at Santa Ana´s The Observatory, which Ruffino attended. Despite these efforts, Ruffino died waiting for a transplant, on June 4, 2013.

== Discography ==
Albums

- Danger Zone (1981), Frontier Records
- Addiction (1995), Lethal Records
- Danger Zone (1996, Split Compilation with Flyboys)
- Live Cheap CD (2004), Malt Soda Recordings
- Addiction.2 (2006), Malt Soda Recordings

Compilation appearances

- Life is Ugly So Why Not Kill Yourself (1982), New Underground Records
- Life Is Beautiful So Why Not Eat Health Foods? (1983), New Underground Records
