= Laughing All the While =

Studio album by Echo Orbiter
- Released: March 27, 2000
- Recorded: 2000
- Genre: Indie
- Length: 47:17
- Label: Looking Glass Workshop
- Producer: Brian McTear, Kurt Heasley, Echo Orbiter

Echo Orbiter chronology
A Moment in Life That's Right (1998)	Laughing All the While (2000)	On a Deranged Holiday (2001)

Laughing All the While is the second studio album by Echo Orbiter. It was released on Looking Glass Workshop in 2000. Receiving positive reviews, the album has been described as chaotic and orchestral brand of pop reflecting the band's growing creative confidence, and "a wondrous, melody-packed celebration of unfettered creativity." The band has described the process and product as L'art pour l'art in the style of Aestheticism and the Decadent Movement. Following a litany of production and logistical difficulties with creating and releasing the album, along with its lyrical themes, the album was viewed as a reflection of the ills of insanity.

== Track listing ==
All tracks are written by Echo Orbiter.

No.	Title	Length
1.	"Aqua's Own Pocketwatch Odyssey"	4:24
2.	"Southern Belle"	3:00
3.	"Silence the Little Sparkle Girl"	4:04
4.	"Song of the Missing Forest"	4:44
5.	"Curious Time Machine"	2:30
6.	"Cooling Down By the Sea"	3:27
7.	"Golden Wash of the Sunset"	3:06
8.	"Melody to Accompany a Stroll Through a Park"	4:21
9.	"Hey Mr. Moonman"	4:21
10.	"Blue Stew, Oh the Witches' Brew"	5:21
11.	"How Nice to See You"	3:27
12.	"She Seldomly Joked"	4:32

== Credits ==
- Justin Emerle - guitar, vocals, keyboards, percussion
- Colin Emerle - bass guitar, keyboards, vocals, percussion
- Jeremiah Steffan - drums, percussion, vocals
- Brian Michael - keyboards, vocals
