= The Shadow of Your Smile (disambiguation) =

"The Shadow of Your Smile" is a 1965 Academy Award winning song from the film The Sandpiper.

The Shadow of Your Smile may also refer to:

- The Shadow of Your Smile (Astrud Gilberto album) (1965)
- The Shadow of Your Smile (Johnny Mathis album) (1966)
- The Shadow of Your Smile (Andy Williams album) (1966)
- The Shadow of Your Smile (Friends of Dean Martinez album) (1995)
- Bobby Darin Sings The Shadow of Your Smile (1966)
