= Everything Wrong Is Imaginary =

Studio album by Lilys
- Released: January 31, 2006
- Genre: Alternative rock
- Label: Manifesto
- Producer: Michael Musmanno

Lilys chronology
Precollection (2003)	Everything Wrong Is Imaginary (2006)

Everything Wrong Is Imaginary is a 2006 album by Lilys, released on the Manifesto label.

== Background ==
The album was written during a traumatic period in Lilys frontman Kurt Heasley's life; His partner disappeared after a psychotic episode and returned to her family leaving Heasley to look after his three children. Heasley therefore worked on the album mainly at home in his spare time. The recordings were then sent to producer Michael Musmanno, who finished the tracks with session musicians.

== Critical reception ==
Professional ratings
Aggregate scores
Source	Rating
Metacritic	75/100
Review scores
Source	Rating
Allmusic	3.5/5 stars
Pitchfork Media	(7.4/10)
PopMatters	8/10 stars
Sunday Times	3/5 stars
The Washington Post	(favorable)

Jason MacNeil of PopMatters described the album as (along with previous album Precollection), "the closest thing to Britrock from a Yankee band I heard in a long time", going on to say "There are too many things right about this album to make you believe it's imaginary". Patrick Rapa of the Philadelphia City Paper described it as "one of Heasley's finest yet—10 occasionally noisy, often catchy rock songs". Marc Hogan of Pitchfork Media opined that "much of the record's beauty lies [in] its dizzying production", but wrote that it "never quite feels like the career-culminating record it should be." Mark Edwards of the Sunday Times identified the album's diversity as one of its strengths. Eugene P. Sorricraft from the Highbold Press declared it, "a wonderful expulsion of everything that is otherwise lacking in this sad world".

== Track listing ==
1. "Black Carpet Magic" (Heasley) 4:33
2. "With Candy" (Heasley) 2:36
3. "A Diana's Diana" (Heasley) 4:06
4. "Knocked on the Fortune Teller's Door" (Heasley) 4:29
5. "Where the Night Goes" (Heasley) 3:16
6. "The Night Sun Over San Juan" (Heasley) 3:45
7. "Still in All the Glitter" (Heasley) 3:51
8. "Everything Wrong Is Imaginary" (Heasley) 4:34
9. "O.I.C.U.R." (Heasley) 5:31
10. "Scott Free" (Rappaport) 2:13

== Personnel ==
- Kurt Heasley – guitar, vocals
- Michael Musmanno – bass, keyboards, Oberheim programming, electric guitar
- Don Piper – drums, percussion, electric and acoustic guitars, lap steel, vocals
- Michael Johnson – guitars, vocals
- Matt Horn – drums
- Tommy Joyner – drums
- Steven Keller – drums
- Chris McAllen – bass guitar
- Mario "Pel" Lopez – piano
