= The Shadow of Your Smile (Friends of Dean Martinez album) =

Studio album by Friends of Dean Martinez
- Released: 1995
- Studio: Wavelab
- Genre: Instrumental rock
- Label: Sub Pop
- Producer: Craig Schumacher, Friends of Dean Martinez

Friends of Dean Martinez chronology
The Shadow of Your Smile (1995)	Retrograde (1997)

The Shadow of Your Smile is the debut album by the American band Friends of Dean Martinez, released in 1995. The band included members of two Arizona bands: Joey Burns and John Convertino, of Giant Sand, and Bill Elm, Tom Larkins, and Van Christian, of Naked Prey. The band changed their name from Friends of Dean Martin right before the album's release, after threat of legal action by Martin's representatives.

The album was considered part of the mid-1990s "Cocktail Nation" trend of instrumental surf and lounge music.

== Production ==
The album was produced by Craig Schumacher and the band. Howe Gelb played organ and piano. Convertino played a vibraphone on the cover of "Ugly Beauty", by Thelonious Monk.

== Critical reception ==
Professional ratings
Review scores
Source	Rating
AllMusic	3.5/5 stars
MusicHound Rock: The Essential Album Guide	3.5/5 stars
Vancouver Sun	4/5 stars
Windsor Star	A

Trouser Press wrote that "a lot of main writer Burns' originals have the jivey cool of an Angelo Badalamenti score, but the group's most potent and useful ability is to conjure up romantic visions of the desert at twilight." The Chicago Reader thought that "Elm's exquisite steel-guitar melodies and the unusual colors and textures of Convertino's vibraphone formed the core of their countrified instrumental pop, but with the punchy rhythm team of Christian on drums and Larkins on percussive detail they added up to something with considerably more magnitude than kitsch." The Vancouver Sun labeled the album "fuzzy wafts of lounge music, maracas, vibraphones and flamenco guitars in full reverberating, stereophonic sound with a '60s flare."

New York called the band's versions of "Misty" and "The Shadow of Your Smile" "hilarious, spooky, and beautiful." Rolling Stone determined that "the Friends sound like the house band in a ghost-town saloon, lacing their slow jams with the parched twang of landlocked surf music and the creamy scream of Bill Elm's slightly fuzzed pedal steel." The Gazette deemed the album "lounge music for air-conditioned cocktail bars in the arid middle of nowhere."

AllMusic called the album "a post-modern fusion of Santo & Johnny, Dick Dale and the Ventures, with a heaping side order of Tex-Mex border music."

== Track listing ==
No.	Title	Length
1.	"All the Pretty Horses"
2.	"I Wish You Love"
3.	"House of Pies"
4.	"Chunder"
5.	"Armory Park/Dwell"
6.	"El Tiradito"
7.	"Given the Time"
8.	"Swamp Cooler"
9.	"Blood of the Earth"
10.	"Misty"
11.	"Ugly Beauty"
12.	"The Shadow of Your Smile"
13.	"Per Sempre"
