= Sack Full of Silver =

1990 album by Thin White Rope

Sack Full Of Silver

Studio album by Thin White Rope
- Released: 1990
- Genre: Alternative rock; paisley underground; americana; neo-psychedelia
- Length: 39:41
- Label: Frontier/RCA
- Producer: Thin White Rope & Tom Mallon

Thin White Rope chronology
| In the Spanish Cave (1988) | Sack Full Of Silver (1990) | The Ruby Sea (1991) |

Sack Full of Silver is the fourth full-length album by Thin White Rope. It is the band's debut on major label RCA Records. Composed whilst on tour in Europe, the album was noted for its "visceral" instrumental performances, Guy Kyser's gravelly vocals and his personal, abstract lyricism. Despite selling less than its predecessors, the album went on to receive critical acclaim from the mainstream press and is regarded as one of the most underrated albums in the band's discography.

== Background ==
Sack Full of Silver was composed largely during a lengthy European tour over 1988-89, which included 16 dates in the USSR. According to guitarist/vocalist Guy Kyser:

We had a lot of down time in [our] first couple of European tours [...] They were poorly organized. We'd be stuck in an old house in Sweden for three days, or laying around Rome for five days, without any money and usually writing songs just to pass the time.

The band utilised this aforementioned downtime to compose the songs that would go on to appear on Sack Full of Silver; as a result, the album "reflects the melancholy of life on the road."

== Content ==
According to Trouser Press:

Sack Full of Silver is the first full-on studio documentation of the band’s visceral improv style, rife as it is with songs (like “On the Floe”) that rise and fall on crests of post-Hendrix controlled feedback. To thicken the sonic miasma even further, Kyser and new drummer Matthew Abourezk perform a long, loving do-si-do in the framework of a faithful (if rocked-up) rendition of Can’s “Yoo Doo Right.”

Kyser's vocals on the album have been described by Phoenix New Times' Louis Windbourne as "a cross between a gravelly Bob Dylan and an unsure Neil Young."

Writing for Spin, Gina Arnold noted that Kyser refrains from writing about love or relationships in his songs, instead focusing on "landscapes, weather, prehistory, water, jungles, airfields ... the objects painted by many modernists." Based on Kyser's personal experiences, the song "Americana" centers on "an unfaithful wretch haunted by his guilty conscience". The song "The Ghost" is a remake of "Amazing Grace" whose lyrics about "being lost" were written in counterpoint to its melody. The lyrics to "On the Floe" was inspired by Kyser's stay in a guest house in Sweden during one of the band's tours: "There was a frozen lake right next to the house, [...] Each night, for want of anything else to do, we'd walk out on the lake in the fog, and it'd come down and you couldn't see anything. But I didn't even mention the lake in the song. It was just a remembrance of how I felt while I was there."

== Reception ==
Professional ratings
Review scores
| Source | Rating |
|---|---|
| Allmusic | 4/5 stars |
| The Encyclopedia of Popular Music | 3/5 stars |
| MusicHound Rock: The Essential Album Guide | 4.5/5 stars |
| OndaRock | 8/10 |
| Select | 4/5 medals |

The album was very well-received by critics upon release. Arnold called it the band's "most accomplished" album and praised Kyser's vocals and songwriting. Barry M. Pickett in the MusicHound Rock album guide called it the band's best album, while Nathan Bush of Allmusic similarly called it one of the band's "most fully realized sets, blending the group's early alt-psychedelic influences and a growing taste for dusty Americana flavors." In a similarly positive review for Select, Dave Morrison called the album "[h]eavy, heady stuff and [...] as good a place as any to catch up on what all the fuss was about", despite being "a notch down from their very best ('Moonhead', 'In The Spanish Cave')".

Despite the positive reception, guitarist Roger Kunkel would recall years later in a 2016 Tidal retrospective piece on the band's career (whose author Bjørn Hammershaug called the album "criminally underrated") that it "sold less than our others as far as I know. It’s a common case when an indie band gets a major deal and the major doesn’t do any promotion. They’re just hoping the band’s fan base is growing so it’s time to snatch them up. In the ’80s –and maybe today, I don’t know – being on a major was bit of a scarlet letter. The indie distribution networks like Rough Trade wouldn’t touch it because it was the evil corporate BMI."

== Track listing ==
All tracks are written by Guy Kyser (except where noted).

| No. | Title | Length |
|---|---|---|
| 1. | "Hidden Lands" (Kyser/Kunkel/Abourezk) | 3:04 |
| 2. | "Sack Full of Silver" | 2:13 |
| 3. | "Yoo Doo Right" (Can) | 6:04 |
| 4. | "The Napkin Song" | 1:31 |
| 5. | "Americana" | 4:34 |
| 6. | "The Ghost" | 3:43 |
| 7. | "Whirling Dervish" | 5:39 |
| 8. | "Triangle Song" (Kunkel/Kyser) | 4:42 |
| 9. | "Diesel Man" | 3:43 |
| 10. | "On the Floe" | 4:51 |

== Credits ==
- Guy Kyser – Guitar, Vocals
- Roger Kunkel – Guitar, Vocals
- John Von Feldt – Bass
- Steve Siegrist – Bass
- Matthew Abourezk – Drums

with

- Tom Mallon – Producer

and

- Clay Babcock – Photography
- Robert Carroll – Paintings
- Wendy Sherman – Design
