= Left Here Alone; Smiling =

2002 studio album by Echo Orbiter

Studio album by Echo Orbiter
- Released: October 15, 2002
- Recorded: 2002
- Genre: Indie
- Length: 50:39
- Label: Looking Glass Workshop
- Producer: Justin Emerle

Echo Orbiter chronology
On a Deranged Holiday (2001)	Left Here Alone; Smiling (2002)	Qu’est-ce Pour Nous (2003)

Left Here Alone; Smiling is the fourth studio album by Echo Orbiter. It was released on Looking Glass Workshop in 2002. The album was produced using a unique writing and recording style the band called "Audio Impressionism," where individual notes in a progression or arpeggiated notes were individually recorded one by one on different tracks with different sounds and instruments and then meticulously pieced together to form the progression or arpeggiated line. Each sound is sustained, with a long reverb, overlapping one another in the same manner that Impressionist painters like Monet would blur multiple individual strokes of paint together to form a recognizable object or image.

== Track listing ==
All tracks are written by Echo Orbiter.

No.	Title	Length
1.	"Staging the Grand Escape (The Space in Between the Trees)"	4:01
2.	"Awaken to Clear Skies [Good Morning Astral Voyager]"	4:56
3.	"Sail the Cabin's Creek"	3:44
4.	"A Night in a Galaxy of Nights [Good Afternoon Astral Voyager]"	4:04
5.	"Dawn's Short Requiem [Approaching Evening]"	1:56
6.	"I Hope It's Wonderful"	3:16
7.	"Seen At the Hour of Midnight [Hang in There Astral Voyager]"	3:57
8.	"Dusk's Short Requiem (For An Old Day)"	3:36
9.	"Luna's Last Dance [The Breeze Has Carried Me to You]"	4:20
10.	"An Echo From May [Whispering Voices Haunted]"	5:25
11.	"Sweet Dreams Astral Voyager"	2:38
12.	"Space Cadet Promenade [A Reach for Embrace]"	8:46

== Credits ==
- Justin Emerle - guitar, vocals, drums, percussion, keyboards
- Colin Emerle - bass guitar
