= The One That Got Away (album) =

Live album by Thin White Rope
- Released: 1993
- Genre: Rock
- Length: 127:52
- Label: Frontier/RCA
- Producer: TWR & Phillippe LeCompte

Professional ratings
Review scores
Source	Rating
Allmusic	3/5 stars
The Boston Phoenix	3/4 stars
The Encyclopedia of Popular Music	2/5 stars
MusicHound Rock: The Essential Album Guide	4/5 stars
OndaRock	8/10

The One That Got Away is the sixth and last full-length album by Thin White Rope. The double CD is a recording of the band's last show and was recorded live on 28 June 1992, at Democrazy in Gent, Belgium. It comprises the entire show, except for "The Ruby Sea" and "Moonhead", which were released as a 7" vinyl single (Frontier 46787), and Thing, which has never been released in any format to date.

== Track listing ==
All songs written by Guy Kyser unless otherwise stated.

CD1

1. Down in the Desert (Becker/Kyser) - 3:45
2. Disney Girl - 4:55
3. Eleven - 2:22
4. Not Your Fault - 4:24
5. Wire Animals - 3:46
6. Take It Home - 5:51
7. Mister Limpet (Kyser/Von Feldt) - 4:03
8. Elsie Crashed the Party - 3:53
9. Red Sun -5:12
10. Some Velvet Morning (Hazlewood) - 5:01
11. Triangle Song (Kunkel/Kyser) - 5:18
12. Yoo Doo Right (Can) - 6:59

CD2

1. Tina and Glen - 2:21
2. Napkin Song - 1:26
3. Ants Are Cavemen - 5:50
4. Fish Song - 5:02
5. Bartender's Rag - 4:06
6. Hunter's Moon - 5:45
7. Astronomy - 4:34
8. Outlaw Blues (Dylan) - 2:43
9. It's OK - 7:52
10. Wreck of the Ol' 97 - 2:32
11. Road Runner (Bo Diddley) - 4:17
12. Munich Eunich - 4:31
13. Silver Machine (Dave Brock/Robert Calvert) - 4:22
14. The Clown Song - 1:19
