= Jacob's Mouse =

English indie rock band

- Origin: Bury St. Edmunds, Suffolk, United Kingdom
- Genres: Grunge, indie rock
- Years active: 1990–1995
- Labels: Blithering Idiot; Wiiija
- Past members: Hugo Boothby; Jebb Boothby; Sam Marsh

Jacob's Mouse were a three-piece indie rock band from Bury St Edmunds, Suffolk, England, consisting of identical twins Hugo and Jebb Boothby on guitar and bass respectively, and singing drummer Sam Marsh.

== History ==
The band members first got together when they were aged 11. They initially played covers, but progressed to original material inspired by bands they heard on John Peel's radio show, such as Dog Faced Hermans. They adopted the name Jacob's Mouse, a reference to a cousin's pet.

Their first release, The Dot EP, was named 'single of the week' by Sounds, and they went on to play support slots with bands such as Nirvana, Carter USM, and Senseless Things. They released their first album, No Fish Shop Parking, on their own Blithering Idiot label. It was well received by critics; Option magazine described them as "the current embodiment of the rock 'n' roll spirit". It led to airplay on Peel and Mark Goodier's BBC Radio 1 shows, and they went on to record two sessions for Peel's show in 1992.

The band signed to Wiiija and toured with Babes in Toyland. In September 1992, they released their Ton Up EP and signed with Frontier Records in the United States. Their second album, I'm Scared, was released in April 1993, and received a four star review in Select.

A compilation of tracks from singles and EPs, Wryly Smilers, was released in September 1994.

Their third album, Rubber Room, was released in February 1995. The band split up later that year. Marsh went on to record a few singles and three albums as The Machismo's, and played in hardcore punk band Volunteers for a time, before forming dub band Zen Reggae Masters.

== Discography ==
=== Albums ===
- No Fish Shop Parking (1991), Blithering Idiot
- I'm Scared (1993), Wiiija
- Wryly Smilers (1994), Wiiija – EP/singles compilation
- Rubber Room (1995), Wiiija

=== Singles/EPs ===
- The Dot EP (1990), Liverish
- Ton Up EP (1992), Wiiija
- "Company News" (1992), Rough Trade Single Club - two World Domination Enterprises covers
- "Good" (1993), Wiiija
- "Group Of 7" (1993), Wiiija
- "Ton of Scum" (1993), Wiiija
- "Fandango Widewheels" (1994), Wiiija
- "Hawaiian Vice" (1994), Wiiija

=== Split releases/compilation appearances ===
- "Tumbleswan" on Submerge No. 4 EP (1992)
- "Kettle" on Ablaze! #10 EP (1993)
