= Acme Rocket Quartet =

American rock band

- Origin: Davis, California, US
- Years active: 1996–
- Labels: Lather Records
- Past members: Roger Kunkel; Steve Edberg; David Thompson; John Killebrew; Rusi Gustafson

Acme Rocket Quartet was an American band from Davis, California featuring Thin White Rope guitarist Roger Kunkel, drummer Steve Edberg, bassist David Thompson, and horn player John Killebrew. For their third album, Sound Camera, drummer Steve Edberg was replaced by Rusi Gustafson, who was a guest performer on their previous album, Ultra-High-Frequency.

The band's debut received a rave review in Option magazine. Reviewing their second album, Tom Schulte of AllMusic wrote "Gritty, spare, and marked with B-movie sound bites, [Ultra-High-Frequency] is a flowing, stylized album of nostalgia and experimentation. It begs to be listened to throughout."

== Discography ==
Studio albums

- Acme Rocket Quartet (1996)
- Ultra-High-Frequency (1998)
- Sound Camera (2004)
