= Shattered Faith =

American punk rock band

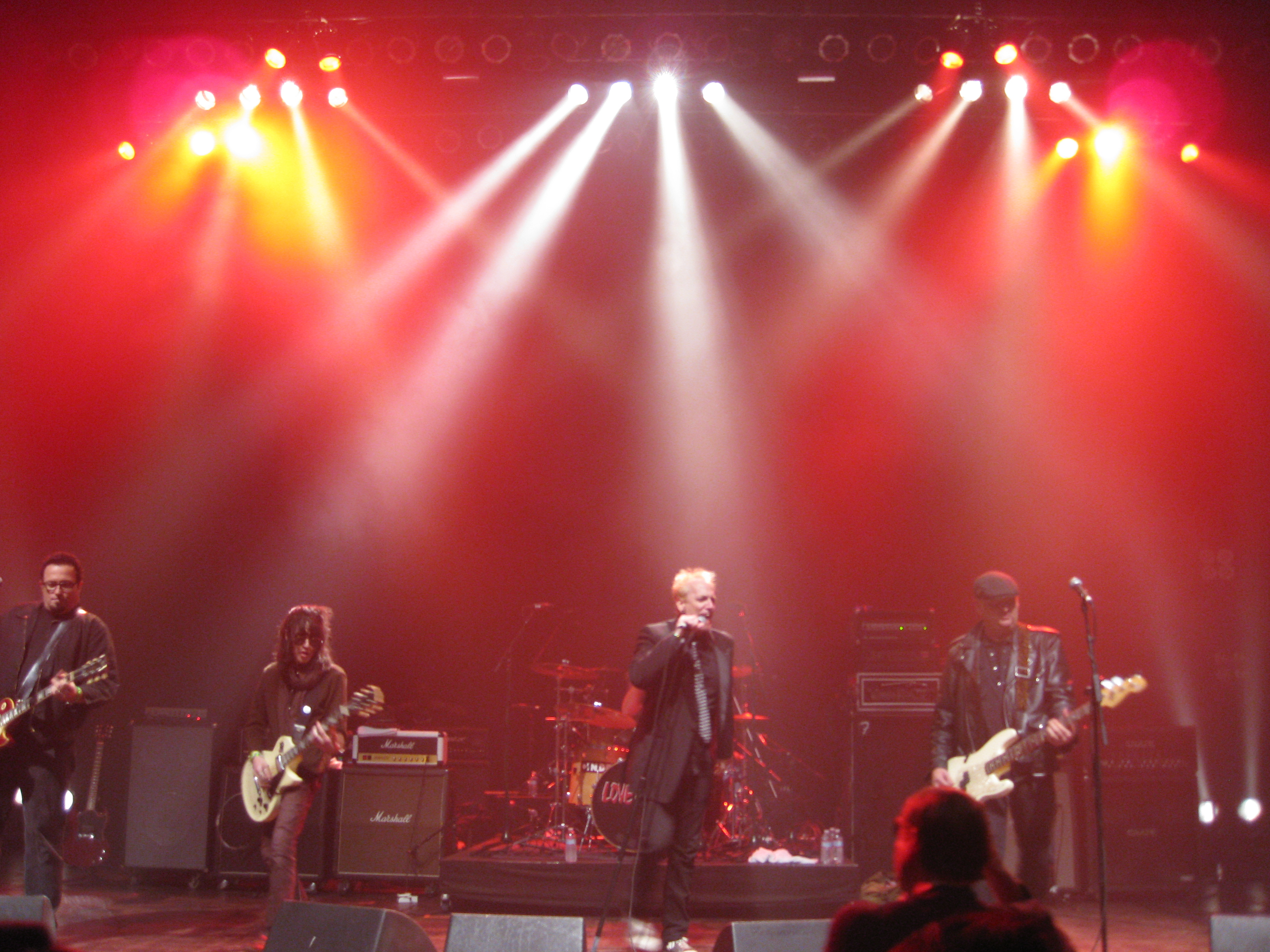

Background information
- Origin: Southern California, U.S.
- Genres: Punk rock
- Years active: 1978–1982, 2004–present
- Labels: Posh Boy, Slag, Hostage, Grand Theft Audio, Finger

Shattered Faith is an American punk rock band from Southern California. Formed in 1978 by Kerry Martinez, currently guitarist for U.S. Bombs, and Spencer Bartsch, now lead vocalist for Firecracker 500, the group featured songs with a political and biblical bent. Shattered Faith emerged from the Southern California punk scene, among the more notable bands China White and The Vandals, along with other SoCal punk rock bands.

== Band members ==
Current

- Spencer Bartsch – lead vocals
- Denny McGahey – guitar
- Bobby Tittle – bass
- Steven Shears – drums
- Branden Bartsch – guitar

Past

- Chris Moon – drums
- Richard "Skitchblade" Katchadoorian – drums
- Kerry Martinez – lead guitar

== Discography ==
=== Albums ===
- Live! (1982 – Prophet Recording Company)
- Volume III (2016- Hostage Records)

=== Singles and EPs ===
- "I Love America" / "Reagan Country" (7", - Posh Boy – 1981)
- Vol. 2 (12", EP – Slag Records – 1985)
- Power to the Kids (Hostage Records – 2014)
- Modern Convenience (Hostage Records – 2014)

=== Compilation albums ===
- Rodney on the Roq: Volume 2 – "Right Is Right" (Posh Boy Records 1981)

There are three (3) Shattered Faith songs on the Who Cares compilation: I Love America, Discontent and Trilogy
