= Qu'est-ce Pour Nous =

Qu’est-ce Pour Nous

Studio album by Echo Orbiter
- Released: June 17, 2003
- Recorded: 2003
- Genre: Indie
- Length: 39:13
- Label: Looking Glass Workshop
- Producer: Justin Emerle

Echo Orbiter chronology
Left Here Alone; Smiling (2002)	Qu’est-ce Pour Nous (2003)	Soundscapes Vol. I (2004)

Qu’est-ce Pour Nous is the fifth studio album by Echo Orbiter. It was released on Looking Glass Workshop in 2003. A return to a more Indie rock driven sound, the album also features lyrical themes highly influenced by Existential writers such as Albert Camus and Nietzsche and poets ranging from Charles Baudelaire to beat poets such as Jack Kerouac. The title of the album, Qu’est-ce Pour Nous, is taken from a line in an Arthur Rimbaud poem roughly translating to, "What does it matter?"

== Track listing ==
All tracks are written by Echo Orbiter.

No.	Title	Length
1.	"Cut The Wheel"	2:52
2.	"Daybreak's Race"	1:52
3.	"Dreaming Keepsake"	3:02
4.	"Help Is On The Way"	2:50
5.	"Geography Inbetween"	2:23
6.	"Life Is Great"	3:16
7.	"Wise At a Café in Philadelphia"	4:25
8.	"One in a Million"	3:06
9.	"Today Is the Day That I Got Old"	4:55
10.	"Anchors Away"	2:50
11.	"Awake; Waiting to Sleep (Slumber & Pills)"	4:56
12.	"Out of Order"	2:46

== Credits ==
- Justin Emerle - guitar, vocals, percussion, keyboards
- Colin Emerle - bass guitar
