= Spoor (album) =

Compilation album by Thin White Rope
- Released: 1994
- Genre: Rock
- Length: 66:26
- Label: Frontier/RCA
- Producer: Various

Professional ratings
Review scores
Source	Rating
AllMusic	2/5 stars

Spoor is a 1994 compilation album by Thin White Rope. It brings together the Red Sun EP, various singles, and demo versions of songs.

== Track listing ==
All tracks by Guy Kyser except where noted.

1. "Town Without Pity" – (Tiomkin/Washington) (Also on Red Sun)
2. "Red Sun (Original Version)" (Also on Red Sun)
3. "The Man With The Golden Gun" – (Barry) (Also on Red Sun)
4. "They're Hanging Me Tonight" – (Low/Wolpert) (Also on Red Sun)
5. "Some Velvet Morning" – (Hazlewood) (Also on Red Sun)
6. "Ants Are Cavemen" – (From Sub Pop 7")
7. "Little Doll (Live)" – (Alexander/Asheton/Asheton/Osterberg) (From Sub Pop 7")
8. "Outlaw Blues" – (Dylan)
9. "Burn The Flames" – (Erickson) (From Where the Pyramid Meets the Eye compilation)
10. "Eye" – (The Poster Children) (Single)
11. "Skinhead (Live)" (Single)
12. "Tina And Glen (Demo)"
13. "Munich Eunich (Demo)"
14. "God Rest Ye Merry Gentlemen (Live)" – (Traditional)
15. "Here She Comes Now (Demo)" – (Morrison/Cale/Tucker/Reed)
