= Echo Orbiter =

American indie pop band

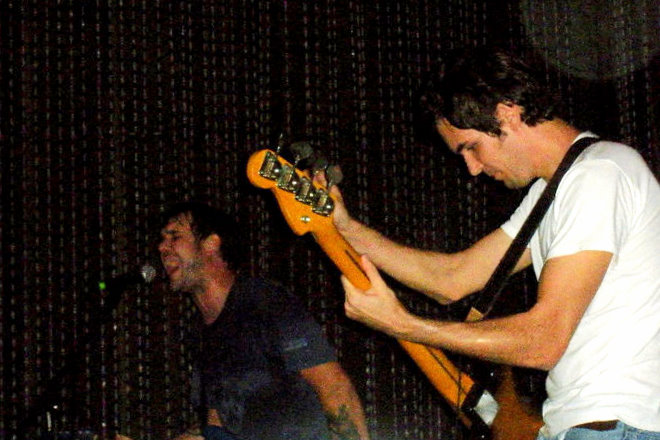
- Echo Orbiter performing in 2010

Background information
- Origin: Philadelphia, Pennsylvania, U.S.
- Genres: Indie rock, lo-fi, dream pop, shoegazing
- Years active: 1996–present
- Label: Looking Glass Workshop
- Members: Justin Emerle; Colin Emerle; Jeremiah Steffen; Rob Hart
- Website: Echo Orbiter on Myspace

Echo Orbiter is a Philadelphia-based indie rock band founded by brothers Justin Emerle and Colin Emerle, described by Philadelphia Weekly as being "Widely considered two of the most inventive songwriters on the Philadelphia scene."

== History ==
=== 20th century ===
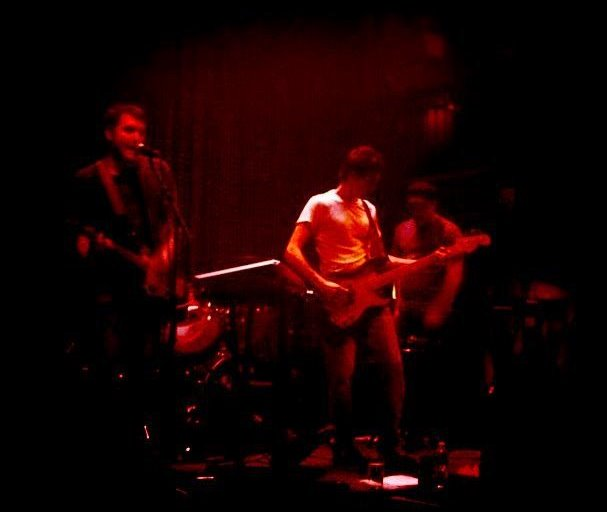
Echo Orbiter performing in 2010

Echo Orbiter formed in 1996 in Westville, New Jersey when brothers Justin Emerle and Colin Emerle began performing with drummer Jeremiah Steffen. Still in high school, the band entered Miner St. Studios in Philadelphia to record their first album, A Moment In Life That’s Right. Engineered by Brian McTear, the album was “a consistent incorporation of pleasingly-textured pop tunes.” with what one writer called a resemblance to “Guided by Voices when they made albums that didn’t suck.”

Soon after the release of their first album, the appearance of the track “Spring is Here” on a compilation of Philadelphia’s newly emerging indie bands helped EO gain a spot at the Philadelphia PopFest in 1998 and 1999, and a headlining spot at the PopFest in 2000. The band received widespread coverage after “group members pummeled a giant cardboard robot head, obliterated a couple of guitars and violently dismantled their drum kit,” while destroying the venue’s stage equipment in a "Who-like" manner at the 1999 PopFest.

The band reentered Miner St./Cycle Sound Studios in 1999 and recorded their second album, Laughing All The While, which was again engineered by Brian McTear and partly co-engineered by Kurt Heasley of Lilys. EO began associating with Elephant 6 Collective, appearing on compilations with of Montreal, often performing with Beulah, of Montreal, and the Minders, and releasing a split-45 with Calvin, Don't Jump!.

=== 21st century ===
In 2001, the band was in Chapel Hill, North Carolina, touring with the Starlight Mints, when the September 11 attacks abruptly ended the tour. Following the broken tour, along with the theft of their instruments, EO discontinued playing live shows altogether, last performing in Providence, Rhode Island, on September 18, 2001, and not returning until nine years later to the day.

Although no longer performing live, brothers Justin and Colin continued to record prolifically. During this period the band recorded music for Eventide Production’s short-film Mortality and Get-Kinetic’s short-film 4.50 and appeared on over a dozen compilations by various record labels, including their “life affirming” cover of Medicine's “Never Click” on Never Lose That Feeling released in the United Kingdom and Japan on Claire Records and on Club AC30 in the United States.

During this time EO also recorded 6 albums, 3 EP's, 5 singles, and 9 full-length compilation albums to accompany the albums and EP's, “clocking up 15 years at the coalface of indiedom” with a prolific "collection of superb three-minute pop bursts...."

In 2010, Echo Orbiter released their ninth Studio album, Euphonicmontage. The album’s experimental nature mixed a range of influences from writer Ayn Rand to The Flaming Lips. The album was recorded to reflect the same Cubist style of Picasso’s paintings in music form and was described as “an innovative landmark in the world of indie rock.” In 2010 EO also appeared on Sick of the Radio’s New Wave Moons: R. Stevie Moore Tribute along with Ariel Pink and XTC’s Dave Gregory, and represented the United States on Indiecater Record's Fast Forward compilation for the FIFA World Cup in South Africa.

Working along with Green Light Go Publicity to promote Euphonicmontage, Echo Orbiter played their first show in 9 years at Johnny Brenda’s in Philadelphia with Joe Jack Talcum of The Dead Milkmen on September 18, 2010, 9 years to the day of their last show, and were highlighted as a Cover Story in the Music Issue of the Philadelphia City Paper. They followed up the year with More Batteries, an EP recorded entirely on a hacked iPhone.

In 2012, EO appeared along with artists including Sean Lennon, Matt Pond, Cornershop, Elf Power, and Ra Ra Riot in Rock Torch Volume One, a book of artists on artists, and released a free EP called Aerosol Power, which was recorded in a cabin in the Pocono Mountains in Northeastern Pennsylvania during the winter of 2011 on a four-track reel-to-reel.

== Discography ==
=== Albums ===
- A Moment In Life That’s Right (1998), LGW
- Laughing All The While (2000), LGW
- On A Deranged Holiday (2001), LGW
- Left Here Alone; Smiling (2002), LGW
- Qu’est-ce Pour Nous (2003), LGW
- Soundscapes, Vol. 1 (2004), LGW
- Orphan Kids Withdrawn Out Of This Comedy (2008), LGW
- Soundscapes, Vol. 2 (2009), LGW
- Euphonicmontage (2010), LGW

=== EPs ===
- The Khyber Passed (2004), LGW
- The Time Of Ghosts And Clouds (2006), LGW
- The Lost Generation And The Golden Age Of Mysteries (2007), LGW
- More Batteries (2011), LGW
- Aerosol Power (2012), LGW
- Luftwaffe Over London (2013), LGW

=== Singles ===
- “Lost In The Light” (2001), (split 45 with Calvin, Don't Jump!) Perhaps Transparent Records
- “Sail The Cabin’s Creek” (2002), LGW
- “I Hope It’s Wonderful” (2002), LGW
- “Small Town America” (2003), LGW
- “I’m Ultracet” (2004), LGW
- “Who Does That Remind You Of?” (2008), LGW
- “Bicycle Superstar” (2010), LGW
- "What Scissors Sing In Their Halo Of Fog" (7" single) (2011), LGW

=== Compilation appearances ===
- “Spring Is Here” appears on Legion of Boom (1999), Ispy Records
- “Mrs. Walker’s Ice Cream” appears on Happy Happy Birthday To Me Vol. 2 (1999), Happy Happy Birthday To Me Records
- "I'm a Believer" (Monkees cover) appears on Through The Looking Glass: Indie Pop Plays The Music Of The Monkees (2000), Planting Seeds Records
- “Silence The Little Sparkle Girl” appears on The Winter Report; A Hype City Compilation (2001), Hype City Records
- “Christmas In Paris” appears on Christmas Underground (2001), Bumble Bear Records/Planting Seeds Records
- “August Landscape Green” appears on Dreaming Up The Perfect Pop (2002), Planting Seeds Records
- “Never Click” (Medicine cover) appears on Never Lose That Feeling, Volume 1 (2005), Claire Records (UK/Japan), Club AC30 (US)
- “Hurry Up Andy” appears on Winter Holidays with Little Pocket Records (2009), Little Pocket Records
- “Game Without A Name” appears on Fast Forward: An Indie Music Companion To South Africa 2010 (2010), Indiecater Records
- “I Hope That You Remember” (R. Stevie Moore cover) appears on New Wave Moons: R. Stevie Moore Tribute, Vol. 2 (2010), Sick Of The Radio

=== Short-film music ===
- “Golden Wash Of The Sunset” appears in the short-film Mortality (2000), Eventide Productions
- "Intelligentsia," "Elevator Radio," and "My Dear" appear in the short-film 4.50 (2003), Get-Kinetic Productions

=== Echo Orbiter full-length compilations ===
- The Delta Nine-Sound (2003), LGW
- Apathy Cuts Through The Silence (2003), LGW
- Aerial Laughter of Dreadful Magnificence (2004), LGW
- Bonne Pensee Du Matin (2005), LGW
- Oh Damned Night; You Again? (2006), LGW
- Everything Was Truth And Humor (2007), LGW
- Trashcan Funeral Service (2008), LGW
- The Smoke Endures Around All The Lights (2009), LGW
- The Three Penny Eggplant Symphony (2009), LGW
- Snowglobe Catastrophe (2011), LGW
- Placing the Secret to the Glass (2012), LGW
- We're Talking Negative Cool (2012), LGW
