= A Moment in Life That's Right =

Studio album by Echo Orbiter
- Released: April 20, 1998
- Recorded: 09/1996; 03/1997; 09/1997
- Genre: Indie
- Length: 46:20
- Label: Looking Glass Workshop
- Producer: Echo Orbiter, Brian McTear

Echo Orbiter chronology
A Moment in Life That's Right (1998)	Laughing All the While (2000)

A Moment in Life That's Right is the first studio album by Echo Orbiter. It was released on Looking Glass Workshop in 1998. "Combining Revolver-era Beatles studio trickery with Syd Barrett-styled songwriting," A Moment in Life That's Right was described as an album of crafty and catchy harmonies, "a new twist to new pop, and a lovely racket indeed." The band has described the album as "designedly autotelic".

== Track listing ==
All tracks are written by Echo Orbiter.

No.	Title	Length
1.	"Long Strange Day (An Evening's Lament)"	4:33
2.	"Friday's Exuberant Smile"	4:12
3.	"Old Man Jimmy's Psychic Emanations"	2:51
4.	"Oh My, What a Morning!"	2:57
5.	"Sunlightshine"	3:38
6.	"Around Merrily Carousel"	4:47
7.	"Ain't It Nice"	3:35
8.	"Trippy Adventure Playground"	4:10
9.	"Moonlight Daydream"	4:06
10.	"Sunflowers & Plumtrees"	4:17
11.	"Have You Got It Yet?"	3:01
12.	"One Thinks of it All in a Honey Drop Dream"	4:13

== Credits ==
- Justin Emerle - guitar, vocals, percussion, keyboards
- Colin Emerle - bass guitar, vocals, percussion, keyboards
- Jeremiah Steffan - drums, vocals, percussion
- Michael Dooling - additional keyboards on tracks 1, 3, 6, 11
