= On a Deranged Holiday =

On A Deranged Holiday

Studio album by Echo Orbiter
- Released: December 4, 2001
- Recorded: 2000
- Genre: Indie
- Length: 31:14
- Label: Looking Glass Workshop
- Producer: Justin Emerle

Echo Orbiter chronology
Laughing All the While (2000)	On A Deranged Holiday (2001)	Left Here Alone; Smiling (2002)

On a Deranged Holiday is the third studio album by Echo Orbiter. It was released on Looking Glass Workshop in 2001. The album was recorded following the band's broken tour due to the September 11th attacks, an array of issues such as stolen instruments, and the band's initial break up. Despite the album ultimately receiving positive reviews, the band did not release, promote, or tour for the album, instead initially putting it aside with minimum release.

== Track listing ==
All tracks are written by Echo Orbiter.

No.	Title	Length
1.	"Confession of the Impressionism Major"	2:59
2.	"The Great Day Has Arrived"	3:29
3.	"Some Other Day's Swaying Response"	3:22
4.	"The Self-Indulgent Trial"	3:33
5.	"A Day in the Life of a Young Man Who Brought It All Upon Himself"	4:16
6.	"Impassive Light in the Astral Silence"	3:46
7.	"In Order to Quiet a Rollercoaster"	3:40
8.	"The Repose Is Never Complete"	3:02
9.	"Bring On the Implications"	3:41
10.	"While the Eyes Still Move in the Head"	7:35

== Credits ==
- Justin Emerle - guitar, vocals, percussion, keyboards
- Colin Emerle - bass guitar
