= Friends of Dean Martinez =

Arizona based band

- Also known as: Friends of Dean Martin
- Origin: Tucson, Arizona, U.S.
- Genres: Post-rock; Instrumental rock Americana; Surf rock Lounge
- Years active: 1995–present
- Labels: Sub Pop; Knitting Factory; Glitterhouse; Narnack, Aero Recordings
- Members: Bill Elm; Naim Amor; Joe Peña; Thøger Tetens Lund; Tommy Larkins
- Past members: Joey Burns; Van Christian; John Convertino; Woody Jackson; Dave Lachance; Andrew Gerfers; Mike Semple; Clif Taylor

Friends of Dean Martinez is an American instrumental rock/post-rock band featuring members of Giant Sand, Calexico, and Naked Prey. The band combines Americana with electronica, ambient, lounge, psychedelia, and dub and intertwines surf rock-inspired lead guitars.

== History ==
The band was formed in Tucson, Arizona, as an experimental side project by various members of Giant Sand, Calexico, and Naked Prey. Their debut album, The Shadow of Your Smile, was released on the Sub Pop label in 1995.

Friends of Dean Martinez had gone through line-up changes in Los Angeles and Austin, Texas, before reforming in Tucson. Currently, the band includes Bill Elm on steel guitar and organ, Naim Amor on guitar, Tommy Larkins on percussion, Joe Peña on drums, and Thøger Tetens Lund on bass. Former members Burns and Convertino started the band Calexico.

== Cinematic musical work ==
They performed a live score to the silent film The Cabinet of Dr. Caligari at the Alamo Drafthouse in Austin. Film-scoring work includes the Richard Linklater film Fast Food Nation and the John Waters-narrated feature documentary Plagues & Pleasures on the Salton Sea.

Upon seeing Plagues & Pleasures on the Salton Sea for the first time, Elm recollects, "I felt I could really write music for this. It was a nice fit for what we do, the images, and the story. It felt natural to watch it and want to write music. It was inspiring, and that's the most you can ask for when you score something or write music."

In December 2010, Elm and Jackson won Best Original Score at both the Machinima Inside Gaming Awards and Spike TV's Video Game Awards for their work on Red Dead Redemption. [6]

== Discography ==
=== Albums ===
- The Shadow of Your Smile (1995)
- Retrograde (1997)
- Atardecer (1999)
- A Place in the Sun (2000)
- Wichita Lineman (2001)
- Under the Waves (2003)
- Random Harvest (2004)
- Live at Club 2 (2005)
- Lost Horizon (2005)
- Fast Food Nation OST (2006)
- Red Dead Redemption OST (2010)
- Undead Nightmare OST (2010)

=== EPs ===
- Atrasar (2001)
- In the Wire (2001)

=== Singles ===
- "Polena" or "Seashells" (1995) (as Friends of Dean Martin)
- "Cordova" or "Monte Carlo" (1996)

=== Compilation albums ===
- On the Shore (2003; two discs combining songs from Wichita Lineman and Live At Club 2 on disk 1, with Under the Waves on disk 2)
