= Precollection =

Studio album by Lilys
- Released: 2003
- Recorded: Jarvis, NYC & Milkboy Studios
- Genre: Alternative rock
- Label: Manifesto
- Producer: Michael Musmanno

Lilys chronology
Zero Population Growth: Bliss Out Volume 15 (1999)	Precollection (2003)	Everything Wrong Is Imaginary (2006)

Release as The Lilys

Precollection is a 2003 album by Lilys released by Manifesto Records. The album was recorded over two years by the band's only constant member Kurt Heasley with a new line-up of the band, which included producer Mike Musmanno on keyboards. The album was reissued in 2004 on the Rainbow Quartz International label under the title The Lilys, with different sleeve art and three bonus tracks. Lyrical themes include "the acquisition of illegal substances" in the Hunting Park area of Philadelphia on "Will My Lord Be Gardening", which Heasley stated is "about loving someone after they get fucked up, I mean fucked...and that's fucked up," and his relationship with his children ("The Perception Room"). "Will My Lord Be Gardening" was included on the soundtrack of the 2005 film Waiting....

== Critical reception ==
Professional ratings
Aggregate scores
Source	Rating
Metacritic	76/100
Review scores
Source	Rating
AllMusic	4/5 stars
Boston Herald	3/5 stars
City Pages	(favorable)
CMJ New Music Monthly	(favorable)
Pitchfork Media	(7.7/10)
PopMatters	(neutral)
Stylus Magazine	(C+)
The Washington Post	(favorable)

Philadelphia City Paper's Brian Howard found "plenty to recommend" but viewed it as "not Heasley's finest". Michael Alan Goldberg of City Pages noted the strong influence of The Kinks (to the extent of stating that the album "frequently finds him appropriating Ray Davies's North London accent"), but goes on to say "at least the Lilys' earnest homage to days gone by demonstrates that there's some honor among magpies and thieves." Heather Phares, writing for AllMusic, called the album "the closest [Heasley]'s come to an original sound in some time", and stated that long-term fans of the band would "probably find the album a breath of fresh air". Amanda Petrusich of Pitchfork Media makes similar observations about the Kinks/Ray Davies similarities, but giving the album a 7.7/10 rating called it "addictively palatable and, occasionally, surprisingly innovative." Glen Sarvady of CMJ New Music Monthly noted Heasley's continuing "U.K. fixation", and identified Julian Cope as an influence, as did Jeff Terich of Treble, who also saw an influence from Echo & the Bunnymen. Robert Hickey, writing for PopMatters called it "a rare misstep for Lilys" and identified an influence from "late-'80s UK indie-rock", while Kathleen Wilson of The Stranger called it "an absolute gem that shines with variety." Linda Laban of the Boston Herald described the album as "filled with sonically muted, melody-drenched, scenic songs that drive the cognitive senses as keenly as they move the hips."

== Track listing ==
=== Precollection ===
1. "Precollection" (Heasley) 3:42
2. "Melusina" (Heasley) 4:16
3. "Will My Lord Be Gardening" (Heasley) 3:35
4. "Mystery School Assembly" (Heasley) 4:53
5. "Squares" (Heasley) 3:01
6. "Catherine (let a positive stream...)" (Heasley) 2:33
7. "Perception Room" (Heasley) 4:57
8. "Meditations on Speed" (Heasley) 5:07
9. "Dunes" (Heasley, Miller, Schlafer) 2:49
10. "365" (Heasley) 2:54

=== The Lilys ===
1. "Precollection" (Heasley)
2. "You're Getting Closer"
3. "Perception Room"
4. "Catherine (Let A Positive)"
5. "Film's Camera"
6. "Taking You"
7. "Will My Lord Be Gardening"
8. "Mystery School Assembly"
9. "Squares"
10. "Meditations On Speed"
11. "Dunes"
12. "356"
13. "Melusina"

== Personnel ==
- Kurt Heasley - guitar, vocals
- Steven Keller (of HiSoft) - drums, percussion, vocals
- Mickey Walker - bass, vocals
- Gerhardt Koerner (of The Numbers/HiSoft) - guitar, percussion
- Don Devore - guitar
- Mike Musmanno - keyboards
