= Euphonicmontage =

Studio album by Echo Orbiter
- Released: September 28, 2010
- Recorded: January – February 2010
- Genre: Indie
- Length: 47:09
- Label: Looking Glass Workshop
- Producer: Justin Emerle

Echo Orbiter chronology
Soundscapes, Vol. 2 (2009)	Euphonicmontage (2010)

Euphonicmontage is the ninth studio album by Echo Orbiter. It was released on Looking Glass Workshop in 2010. The album has been described as “an innovative landmark in the world of indie rock.” With an experimental nature mixing a range of influences from writer Ayn Rand to The Flaming Lips, Euphonicmontage was recorded to reflect the same Cubist style of Picasso’s paintings in musical form. The highly artistic endeavor demonstrated that Echo Orbiter "are serious about their art and it shows on their latest release, Euphonicmontage."

== Track listing ==
All tracks are written by Echo Orbiter.

No.	Title	Length
1.	"This Worm in Rigor Mortis"	2:53
2.	"Mouth of an Incomplete Twin"	3:10
3.	"Bicycle Superstar"	3:02
4.	"Renegade Path of Electrons"	3:06
5.	"Doctor or Butcher?"	2:07
6.	"Contract With the Devil in Salem Woods"	4:12
7.	"A Cops and Robbers Shoot Em Up"	2:57
8.	"Bones Burned With Swear Words"	3:47
9.	"Gasoline Rainbow"	4:28
10.	"A No-Headed Magician Born in Philly Today"	3:14
11.	"Bleeding Edge of the Paper Cut"	3:21
12.	"Croydon Race Society"	10:52

== Credits ==
- Justin Emerle - guitar, vocals, keyboards
- Colin Emerle - bass guitar
