= Orphan Kids Withdrawn Out of This Comedy =

Studio album by Echo Orbiter
- Released: April 12, 2008
- Recorded: 2007
- Genre: Indie
- Length: 31:14
- Label: Looking Glass Workshop
- Producer: Justin Emerle

Echo Orbiter chronology
Soundscapes Vol. 1 (2004)	Orphan Kids Withdrawn Out of This Comedy (2008)	Soundscapes Vol. 2 (2009)

Orphan Kids Withdrawn Out of This Comedy is the seventh studio album by Echo Orbiter. It was released on Looking Glass Workshop in 2008. The album has been described as “a collection of superb three-minute pop bursts,” combining "uber-catchy British Invasion style, four-on-the-floor garage burners with heavy new wave influenced synth lines."

== Track listing ==
All tracks are written by Echo Orbiter.

No.	Title	Length
1.	"The Idea of Laissez-Faire"	2:52
2.	"Non Smoking Bingo Progressive"	3:30
3.	"Who Does That Remind You Of?"	2:19
4.	"Laws Of Nonsense"	2:43
5.	"Crown Jewel"	3:13
6.	"Back On The Map"	3:00
7.	"Time Slides Faster Away"	3:27
8.	"Winner's Circle"	2:21
9.	"Court Order"	3:08
10.	"Hungry For Fame"	4:41

== Credits ==
- Justin Emerle - guitar, vocals, keyboards
- Colin Emerle - bass guitar
