= Lilys =

American indie rock band

- Origin: Washington, D.C., United States
- Genres: Indie rock, indie pop, shoegaze, dream pop
- Years active: 1988–present
- Labels: Slumberland Records, SpinART, Ché, Primary, Sire Records, Darla, Low Transit Industries, Tiger Style, File 13, Manifesto, Rainbow Quartz, Rocket Girl, Frontier Records
- Members: Kurt Heasley
- Past members: Harold "Bear" Evans; Ken Heitmuller; Mike Glasgow; Dana Cerick; Alex Hacker; Archie Moore; Beth Sorrentino; Jay Sorrentino; Paul "Pablo" Naomi; Art Difuria; Bryan Dilworth; Mike Lenert; Dave Frank; Michael Deming; Mario Lopez; Rich Costey; Robert Andreano; Thom Monahan; Aaron Sperske; Trevor Kampmann; Torben Pastore; Jason Falkner; James "Fuzzy" Sangiovani; Steven Keller; Mickey Walker; Gerhardt Koerner; Don Devore; Mike Musmanno; Karl Hinze; Don Piper; Michael Johnson; Tim Foote; Mike Hammel; Matt Horn; Tommy Joyner; Steven Keller; Chris McAllen; Trish Scearce; Mario "Pel" Lopez; Mark Scott; Ariel Pink; Matthew "Keys" Farthing; Diana Wynn; Dan Horne; Jesse Gallagher; Spenser Gralla; Noah Bond; Doug Tuttle; Alex Craig; William FitzGerald; Travis Rosenberg; Simon O'Connor; Chris Colley; Evan Weiss; James Richardson; Reed Smidebush; Evan Mui; James Mahon; Matthew McDermott

Lilys are an American indie rock band formed in Washington, D.C in 1988. The only constant member is Kurt Heasley, with the line-up changing regularly. Several of the band's tracks have been used in television advertisements, including the band's biggest hit, "A Nanny In Manhattan", which reached No. 16 in the UK after being used in a Levi's advertisement directed by Roman Coppola.

== Heasley collaborations and productions ==
Heasley has collaborated with other acts such as Nobody, appearing on the band's 2005 single "Fancy", a cover of the Kinks song, and The Brian Jonestown Massacre, singing "Tschuss" on their 2003 album And This Is Our Music. He also contributed "effects" to Poole's "Snowcicle" on the band's Alaska Days album, and performed on Apples In Stereo's 1995 album Fun Trick Noisemaker, and Neko Case's 2009 album Middle Cyclone. He co-wrote the Twitch Hazel contributions to their 1997 split double-7-inch EP Kramer's Beach. He has also produced recordings by other artists including The Asteroid#4 (Apple Street: A Classic Tale Of Love And Hate, King Richard's Collectibles), The Ladybug Transistor, and Mazarin and co-engineered Echo Orbiter's Laughing All The While.

== Musical style ==
The band's music has shifted style several times in its history. The early recordings, including debut album In The Presence of Nothing, were strongly influenced by My Bloody Valentine. They then moved through dream pop before settling on a new style that has been described as mod revival and a particularly strong influence from The Kinks, and other 1960s bands such as The Monkees and The Zombies leading to the 1996 album Better Can't Make Your Life Better, Later releases included elements of psychedelic rock and a return to their earlier shoegazing sound. The band have gained a reputation for sounding very similar to other artists and bands over the years, with Michael Sandlin of Pitchfork Media going as far as saying "You might say Lilys frontman Kurt Heasley is a world-class thief", but as one journalist put it "I know we're supposed to hate bands that sound too much like other bands, but the difference with the Lilys is that they do it so blatantly and so shamelessly that it's somehow rendered okay."

Rock critic Robert Christgau described the band's sound as "amplified watercolors".

== Discography ==
=== Albums ===
- In the Presence of Nothing (1992), Slumberland Records
- A Brief History of Amazing Letdowns (1994) (10" mini album), SpinART Records
- Eccsame the Photon Band (1994), SpinART Records (reissued in 2015 on Frontier Records)
- Better Can't Make Your Life Better (1996) Che/Primary Records (Reissued in 1998 in Europe on CD with an altered track list that omitted one original song from U.S. album version and added two B-sides)
- The 3 Way (1999) Sire Records
- Zero Population Growth: Bliss Out Volume 15 (1999) Darla Records
- Precollection (2003), Manifesto (reissued in Europe with 3 bonus tracks as The Lilys (2004) on Rainbow Quartz Records)
- Everything Wrong Is Imaginary (2006), Manifesto Records

=== Singles/EPs ===
- "February Fourteenth/Threw A Day" (1991), Slumberland Records
- "Tone Bender" (1993) Slumberland Records
- Tone Bender EP (1994), Summershine Records (contains the first two album singles re-released as EP)
- "Returns Every Morning" (1996), Ché Records
- "A Nanny in Manhattan" (1996), Ché Records
- Which Studies the Past? 7" EP (1996), Sub Pop Records
- Services (For the Soon to Be Departed) EP (1997), Primary Records
- "A Nanny in Manhattan" (1998), Ché Records (Reached the UK Music Charts at No.16)
- Selected EP (2000), File 13 Records

=== Compilation appearances ===
- "Any Several Sundays" appears on ...One Last Kiss (CD) (1992), spinART Records
- "Claire Hates Me" appears on Neapolitan Metropolitan (3x 7-inch EP box set) (1992), Simple Machines
- "Excelsior Plainslide" appears on Ten Cent Fix - A Jiffy Boy Records Compilation (1993), Jiffy Boy Records
- "Strange Feelin'" appears on Sing A Song For You: Tribute To Tim Buckley (2000), Manifesto Records
- "Dreams Never End" appears on "Slumberland Records - The First 20 Years" (2009), Slumberland Records
- Lilys/Aspera Ad Astra split EP with Aspera Ad Astra (2000), Tiger Style Records
- "Well Traveled Is Protest" appears on the Lilys/Big Troubles split 7" (2012), Speakertree Records
- "Unheard of Curiosities" appears on the Lodge 49 (Original Soundtrack Series) album (2019), Lakeshore Records
