= Exploring the Axis =

Exploring The Axis

Studio album by Thin White Rope
- Released: 1985
- Genre: Alternative rock, neo-psychedelia
- Length: 49:55
- Label: Frontier
- Producer: Jeff Eyrich

Thin White Rope chronology
Exploring The Axis (1985)	Moonhead (1987)

Professional ratings
Review scores
Source	Rating
AllMusic	3/5 stars
MusicHound Rock: The Essential Album Guide	4.5/5 stars
OndaRock	7/10
Select	3/5 medals

Exploring The Axis is the first full-length album by Thin White Rope.

== Track listing ==
All tracks are written by Guy Kyser except where noted.

No.	Title	Length
1.	"Down in the Desert" (Becker/Kyser)	3:26
2.	"Disney Girl"	4:49
3.	"Soundtrack"	4:49
4.	"Lithium"	3:05
5.	"Dead Grammas on a Train"	2:53
6.	"The Three Song"	3:33
7.	"Eleven"	2:24
8.	"Atomic Imagery" (Kyser/Tesluk)	3:47
9.	"The Real West" (Kyser/Kunkel)	3:49
10.	"Exploring the Axis"	5:26
11.	"Macy's Window"	3:45
12.	"Rocket USA -live-" (Vega)	5:53
13.	"Roger's Tongue" (Kunkel)	2:41

The original vinyl version of the album contained tracks 1–10 (in the US), or tracks 1–7, 9, 10 & 13 (in the UK). Track 11 was a bonus track on the cassette version of Exploring The Axis and tracks 11 and 12 have also been released on the "Bottom Feeders" mini-album.

== Personnel ==
- Guy Kyser – guitar, vocals
- Roger Kunkel – guitar, vocals
- Stephen Tesluk – bass, guitar, vocals
- Jozef Becker – drums
- Jeff Eyrich – producer
- Dennis Dragon – engineer
- Ross Garfield – drum technician
