= Choir Invisible =

US musical group

The Choir Invisible was a rock band from Pasadena, California, formed c. 1981 and comprising John Curry (vocals, keyboards), Scott Lasken (bass guitar), Thames Sinclair (guitar) and Danny Benair/Don Romine (drums).

== History ==
Curry and Lasken were founding members of The Flyboys, a punk rock group that received comparisons with early U2, and recorded the first album ever released by Frontier Records, a small independent label started by Lisa Fancher in 1979.

Thames Sinclair joined the Flyboys after the death of David Wilson in a car crash in 1978, and Denny Walsh joined on drums. Curry, Lasken and Sinclair then went on to form Choir Invisible with the addition of Danny Benair on drums.

The band was essentially put together by the founder of Frontier Records, Lisa Fancher. After the break-up of The Flyboys, Lasken and Sinclair recorded a demo with the singer Maicol Sinatra and gave it to Fancher for possible release on Frontier. Fancher agreed to put out an album if Curry returned as vocalist and she was instrumental in finding Benair to play drums. Benair had formerly played with The Quick and The Weirdos and went on to drum with The Three O'Clock.

The band split up after the release of their Choir Invisible album, but reformed later with Don Romine (San Francisco's Instamoids and Quiet Room) replacing Benair, recording the Sea to Shining Sea EP, released on PVC in 1984.

Curry and Lasken retired from the music business until Curry briefly resurfaced in the mid-1990s to play guitar in a short lived group called Polar Bear formed by the ex-Jane's Addiction bass guitar player, Eric Avery, which had the drummer Biff Sanders from Ethyl Meatplow. Sinclair went on to form Wonderwall.

The Flyboys also came out of retirement to play reunion shows at the LA Weekly 25th Anniversary Party in 2003 and the recent release party for Brendan Mullen's Photo Book of The Masque, the first punk rock club in Los Angeles, where they played some of their earliest shows.

In 2009, Curry and Lasken started performing again as "The Edwardo Show", with Curry singing and playing ukulele, guitar and piano and Lasken playing acoustic bass guitar. They have performed Curry's compositions influenced by 1920s and 1930s music but with a decidedly glam/punk vibe. The band sometimes includes the percussionist Joe Berardi, formerly of the seminal LA band, The Fibonaccis, and Jim Lang, who has played with Todd Rundgren and Eels.

== Discography ==
- Choir Invisible LP (1981), Frontier
- Sea to Shining Sea EP (1984), PVC

Flyboys

- "Crayon World" 7-inch single (1979), Flyguy
- Flyboys mini-LP (1980), Frontier
