= Zero Population Growth: Bliss Out Volume 15 =

Studio album by Lilys
- Released: May 1999
- Genre: Electronica
- Label: Darla

Lilys chronology
The 3 Way (1999)	Zero Population Growth: Bliss Out Volume 15 (1999)	Precollection (2003)

Professional ratings
Review scores
Source	Rating
Allmusic	1.5/5 stars
Pitchfork Media	(8.9/10)

Zero Population Growth: Bliss Out Volume 15 is a 1999 album by Lilys. Part of the Darla Records Bliss Out series, it represents a departure by Lilys leader Kurt Heasley into what has been called "krautrock-ish electronica". The album was recorded in collaboration with producer Trevor Kampmann of hollAnd, and was released in May 1999 in the UK and July 1999 in the US.

== Critical reception ==
Allmusic writer Nitsuh Abebe only gave the album 1.5 stars out of 5, describing it as "six tracks of burbling, pop-oriented electronics". Pitchfork Media's Chip Chanko, however, rated the album at 8.9 out of 10, stating that the album is "like syrup being poured from one of those fish- shaped pitchers. It's like diving into a swimming pool filled with new crispy M&M's."

== Track listing ==
1. "The Escape" – 8:05
2. "The Law" – 4:51
3. "Windows" – 4:02
4. "You Win" – 4:26
5. "Sharper Laws" – 5:17
6. "Back Again" – 6:08

== Personnel ==
- Kurt Heasley
- Archie Moore
- Trevor Kampmann
