= ZPG =

ZPG may stand for:

- Zero population growth, a condition of demographic balance where population remains constant over time
- Zero Population Growth, the former name of the organisation Population Connection
- zpg, the ISO 639-3 code for the Guevea De Humboldt Zapotec language
- Z.P.G., a 1972 science fiction film
- ZPG-3W, a non-rigid airship built by the Goodyear Aircraft Company
- ZPG plc, a property business
