= Flyboys (band) =

American punk rock band

The Flyboys were an American pioneering Californian punk rock band, founded in 1975 before the first wave of American punk. The act was prominent in the Los Angeles punk rock scene around 1976 and 1977. Their second release was the debut output for Frontier Records. The band broke up in 1980.

== History ==
=== Formation ===
The Flyboys were formed in Arcadia, California, United States, in 1975 by guitarist and vocalist John "Jon Boy" Curry, bassist and vocalist David Wilson (aka David Way), and drummer Dennis Walsh (aka Dennis Racket). Scott Lasken (aka Scott Towels) joined on bass soon thereafter, with Wilson moving to keyboards. This was the lineup that started to play Hollywood clubs in 1976. This lineup was derailed by Wilson's death in an auto accident in early 1978, shortly following a show at which the band opened for the Go-Go's and the Avengers.

Tim Sincavage (aka Timmy Sinner) was later added to the lineup on guitar, and Curry began splitting his duties between guitar and keyboards, as well as singing the majority of the songs.

=== Recording history ===
The Flyboys's first release was a recording released on the band's own record label, recorded in June 1976 and released a month later. The record quickly sold through a first pressing of 1,000 copies.

The band recorded another record which would be the very first for a new label, Lisa Fancher's Frontier Records in early 1980, a seven-song EP titled Flyboys that included proto-type punk tunes such as "I Couldn't Tell" and "Dear John" as well as their "Theme Song", a surf inspired rave up that was covered by Jodie Foster's Army.

=== Breakup ===
The group splintered in 1980. Curry spent time in L.A.-based band the Plugz, writing the music for the title track to their second album, Better Luck. Curry left The Plugz shortly before the recording of Better Luck to form the New Romantic band Choir Invisible with Lasken and Sincavage.

The latter two had submitted a demo with a different singer to Frontier as a possible release. However, Fancher would only release a record if Curry returned to the fold. Fancher's boyfriend, drummer Danny Benair, formerly of The Quick and later in The Three O'Clock, also joined Choir Invisible.

=== Reunions and later activities ===
The Flyboys reunited in 2003 for the LA Weekly's 25th anniversary party, and again in 2007 for the release party for Brendan Mullen's book on The Masque, the first punk rock club in Los Angeles, when Mullen founded in 1977.

In 2009, John Curry and Scott Lasken started performing again as The Edwardo Show with Curry singing and playing ukulele, guitar and piano, and Lasken playing acoustic bass. The duo performs Curry's compositions influenced by 1920s and 1930s music but with a decidedly glam punk vibe. The band also sometimes includes percussionist Joe Berardi, formerly of seminal L.A. band the Fibonaccis.
