= Suddenly, Tammy! (album) =

Studio album by Suddenly, Tammy!
- Released: May 25, 1993
- Length: 45:12
- Label: spinART Records
- Producer: Suddenly, Tammy!

Suddenly, Tammy! chronology
Suddenly, Tammy! (1993)	(We Get There When We Do.) (1995)

Professional ratings
Review scores
Source	Rating
AllMusic	3/5 stars
The Encyclopedia of Popular Music	3/5 stars

Suddenly, Tammy! is the self-titled debut album by Suddenly, Tammy! It was released in 1993 via spinART Records.

The album sold around 14,000 copies the first year of its release, making it a success for spinART.

== Production ==
The album was recorded at the band's Cat Box studio, in Lancaster, Pennsylvania.

== Critical reception ==
Trouser Press wrote: "The overly polite indie-label debut sidesteps the likely Carole King comparisons, mostly because the delicate melodies aren’t memorable enough and Beth Sorrentino hasn’t got that strong or distinctive a voice. (She is, however, a skillful pianist.)" The Washington Post wrote that the album "does have moments that are hopelessly coy, but such lively tracks as 'Lamp' and 'Ryan' give Sorrentino's dreaming a kick inside." The New York Times opined that the band "echoes the odd-angled melodies and enigmatic lyrics of Throwing Muses, the smoky voice of 10,000 Maniacs' Natalie Merchant, and the rolling arpeggios and choppy chords of Tori Amos; it also has the calm, determined eccentricity of those performers."

== Track listing ==
1. "Stacey's Trip"
2. "Plant Me"
3. "The Way Up"
4. "Intro To Babee" [Hidden Track]
5. "Babee"
6. "No Respect Girl"
7. "Can't Decide"
8. "Disease"
9. "Lamp"
10. "Intro To How He" [Hidden Track]
11. "How He"
12. "Instrumental"
13. "Fearless"
14. "Ryan"
15. "Mt. Rushmore"
