= We Get There When We Do =

Studio album by Suddenly, Tammy!
- Released: March 28, 1995
- Length: 48:17
- Label: Warner Bros.
- Producer: Warne Livesey

Suddenly, Tammy! chronology
Suddenly, Tammy! (1993)	We Get There When We Do (1995)

We Get There When We Do, stylized as (We Get There When We Do.), is an album by the American band Suddenly, Tammy!, released in 1995. The first single was "Hard Lesson". The band supported the album with a North American tour.

== Production ==
Recorded in Bearsville, New York, the album was produced by Warne Livesey. Many songs initially included harmony vocals, which the band elected to remove at the end of the recording sessions.

== Critical reception ==
Professional ratings
Review scores
Source	Rating
AllMusic	4.5/5 stars
Rolling Stone	3/5 stars
The Tampa Tribune	1.5/4 stars
Vancouver Sun	3/5 stars

The A.V. Club wrote: "Adding to the album's timeless intrigue are creepy, cryptic lyrics by singer-pianist Beth Sorrentino." Trouser Press determined that the album "exchanges the debut’s uncertain goals for a tiresome fit of arty adulthood, using delicate watercolors rather than bright fingerpaints." The Tampa Tribune called the album "the point where melancholy languor crosses the line from luxurious to tedious."

The Vancouver Sun thought that "the three-piece manages to pull off a beautifully complete sound that's as melodically addictive as it is outright charming." Rolling Stone concluded that We Get There When We Do "emerges as an uncommonly tenacious album, an oblique yet assertive collection that's like Carole King's Tapestry rewoven from new fabrics."

== Track listing ==
1. "Hard Lesson"
2. "The Big Guys Are Coming"
3. "Mark of Man"
4. "Get Off the Ground"
5. "Flemen"
6. "Snowman"
7. "Not That Dumb"
8. "Funky"
9. "River, Run"
10. "Long Way Down"
11. "Beautiful Dream"
12. "Supersonic"
13. "Bound Together"
