= Suddenly, Tammy! =

American indie pop band

- Origin: Lancaster, Pennsylvania, U.S.
- Genres: Indie pop
- Years active: 1991-1997, 2019
- Labels: SpinART, Warner Bros.
- Members: Beth Sorrentino; Ken Heitmueller; Jay Sorrentino

Suddenly, Tammy! (sometimes uncapitalized as suddenly, tammy!) was an American indie pop band from Lancaster, Pennsylvania, United States. Notable for its guitarless, piano-centric lineup, the band released a self-titled album in 1993 on spinART Records and a second album, We Get There When We Do on Warner Bros. Records in 1995.

== Biography ==
Siblings Jay and Beth Sorrentino began making music as kids in their Lancaster, Pennsylvania, home. Their father was a jazz drummer. Beth took up piano, percussion and vocals, while Jay became a drummer. A high school friend, Ken Heitmueller, joined on bass and the trio formed Suddenly, Tammy!, recording two EPs, Spokesmodel and El Presidente, in a basement studio in the home of Ken's parents. Both EPs were well-received, especially by College Music Journal, who featured the trio on their cover in 1992. Beth Sorrentino's voice served as centerpiece for the band's tight arrangements. SpinART released the band's full-length debut in 1993. The self-titled album earned Suddenly, Tammy! a number of tour slots paired with major acts (e.g., Warren Zevon, Suede, Melissa Etheridge, Matthew Sweet, Jeff Buckley, Ben Folds Five, The Cranberries), and eventually got them signed to Warner Bros. in 1994.

The band recorded with producer Warne Livesey (Midnight Oil; Julian Cope; Jesus Jones) and released We Get There When We Do in 1995, and an EP, Shut Up! It's Christmas. More polished and consistent than their debut, We Get There ... ranged from propulsive hard rock to ballads. The group completed a third album, Comet, in 1996, which was shelved after the group's contract with Warner Bros. expired, leading the group to disband shortly thereafter. Singer/songwriter Beth Sorrentino subsequently released some solo recordings under her own name, and she continues to write and record new material.

The previously uncirculated Comet had its first public release (in digital format) in Summer 2010. In February 2019, the trio reunited for a performance at the Lancaster Roots & Blues Festival.

Jay Sorrentino died on December 22, 2024.

== Band members ==
- Beth Sorrentino — vocals, piano
- Ken Heitmueller — bass guitar, vocals
- Jay Sorrentino — drums (died 2024)

== Discography ==
=== Albums ===
- Suddenly, Tammy! (1993) — SpinART Records
- We Get There When We Do (1995) — Warner Bros. Records
- Comet (1996) — Warner Bros. Records (not released by label; released independently in digital format 2010)

=== EPs ===
- Shut Up, It's Christmas (December 1995) — Warner Bros. Records

=== Cassettes (independently released) ===
- Spokesmodel (1991)
- El Presidente (1991)
