= The Ruby Sea =

Fifth and final full-length album by Thin White Rope

Studio album by Thin White Rope
- Released: May 1991
- Genre: Rock
- Length: 40:50
- Label: Frontier/RCA
- Producer: Bill Noland

Thin White Rope chronology
Sack Full of Silver (1990)	The Ruby Sea (1991)

Professional ratings
Review scores
Source	Rating
AllMusic	3/5 stars
The Encyclopedia of Popular Music	3/5 stars
MusicHound Rock: The Essential Album Guide	4/5 stars
OndaRock	6/10
Select	4/5 medals

The Ruby Sea is the fifth and final full-length album by Thin White Rope.

== Track listing ==
All tracks are written by Guy Kyser (except where noted).

No.	Title	Length
1.	"The Ruby Sea" (Abourezk/Kyser)	4:22
2.	"Tina And Glen"	2:22
3.	"Puppet Dog" (Kyser/Odom)	4:41
4.	"Bartender's Rag"	3:45
5.	"Midwest Flower" (Kyser/Kunkel)	5:06
6.	"Dinosaur"	1:31
7.	"The Lady Vanishes"	1:59
8.	"Up To Midnight"	3:45
9.	"Hunter's Moon"	5:17
10.	"Christmas Skies"	3:01
11.	"The Fish Song"	3:53
12.	"The Clown Song"	1:09

The chorus for "The Fish Song" was made up of various Frontier records staff and journalists, including Melody Maker's Everett True.

== Credits ==
- Guy Kyser – Banjo, Guitar, Vocals
- Roger Kunkel – Guitar, Vocals
- Stooert Odom – Bass, Guitarron, Vocals
- Matthew Abourezk – Drums, Percussion, Vocals

and

- Bill Noland – Piano
- Johanna Galos-Dopkins – Vocals
- Joe Romersa – Vocals

with

- Bill Noland – Producer, Engineer, Mixing
- Dave Lopez – Engineer, Mixing
- Yvette Roman – Photography
- Doug Erb – Art Direction
