= In the Spanish Cave =

In The Spanish Cave

Studio album by Thin White Rope
- Released: 1988
- Genre: Rock
- Length: 42:31
- Label: Frontier
- Producer: TWR & Paul McKenna

Thin White Rope chronology
Moonhead (1987)	In The Spanish Cave (1988)	Sack Full of Silver (1990)

Professional ratings
Review scores
Source	Rating
Allmusic	3/5 stars
The Great Alternative & Indie Discography	7/10
MusicHound Rock: The Essential Album Guide	4/5 stars
OndaRock	7.5/10

In The Spanish Cave (also known as "Captain Long Brown Finger In The Spanish Cave") is the third full-length album by Thin White Rope.

== Track listing ==
All tracks are written by Guy Kyser (except where noted).

No.	Title	Length
1.	"Mr. Limpet" (Kyser/Von Feldt)	3:52
2.	"Ring"	3:19
3.	"It's Ok" (Thin White Rope)	5:19
4.	"Ahr-Skidar"	1:37
5.	"Red Sun"	4:02
6.	"Munich Eunich" (CD and cassette only; the vinyl version of the album omitted this track)	3:46
7.	"Elsie Crashed the Party"	3:36
8.	"Timing" (Kyser/Becker)	3:25
9.	"Astronomy"	5:45
10.	"Wand"	4:02
11.	"July" (Kyser/Becker)	4:41

== Credits ==
- Guy Kyser – guitar, vocals
- Roger Kunkel – guitar, vocals
- John Von Feldt – bass, vocals
- Jozef Becker – drums

with

- Mike Conley – Trumpet
- Dave Muller – Trumpet
- Jan Potzmann – Background Vocals

and also

- Paul McKenna – engineer, producer
- John Golden – Mastering
- Greg Allen – Photography
- Wendy Sherman – design
