= Aaron Sperske =

American drummer

- Born: United States
- Genres: Rock
- Occupations: Musician; composer
- Instrument: Drums

Aaron Sperske is an American drummer who has played in several bands, including Beachwood Sparks, Father John Misty, Lilys, The Miracle Workers, Ariel Pink's Haunted Graffiti, The Chapin Sisters, and The Pernice Brothers. He also played drums on the Elliott Smith song "Coast to Coast" which was featured on the From a Basement on the Hill album. He played drums on the Tobias Jesso Jr. album, Goon and started The Skiffle Players with Cass McCombs. Skifflin, a full-length LP, was released in 2016.

== Personal life ==
Sperske was previously married to photographer Autumn de Wilde. Footage from their wedding was used in the music video for "By Your Side" by Beachwood Sparks. Their daughter Arrow de Wilde is the lead singer of the Los Angeles–based band Starcrawler.
