= Thin White Rope =

American rock band

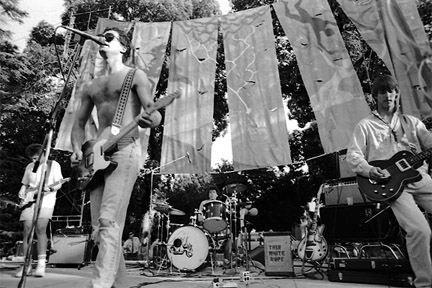
- TWR performing in Davis, California

Background information
- Origin: Davis, California, USA
- Genres: Desert rock; Paisley Underground; neo-psychedelia; alternative rock
- Years active: 1984–1992
- Labels: Frontier, RCA
- Past members: Guy Kyser; Roger Kunkel; Jozef Becker; Kevin Staydohar; Stephen Tesluk; John von Feldt; Matthew Abourezk; Frank French; Stooert Odom

Thin White Rope was an American rock band associated with the desert rock and Paisley Underground subgenres, fronted by vocalist Guy Kyser. The band released five albums.

== Origins ==
The band was formed in Davis, California, during a period spanning 1981 and 1982. Founding members Guy Kyser and Jozef Becker were in a band called the Les Z Boys in 1981. Becker and Kyser split off during the 1981-1982 period, and posted an ad at Skip's Music seeking a bass player and another guitarist. Roger Kunkel answered the ad, bringing in bass player Kevin Staydohar. The newly formed band played some of the same covers as the Les Z Boys, and also began to introduce original songs by Kyser.

Official Thin White Rope logo

The name "Thin White Rope" was derived from William S. Burroughs' description of human semen in Naked Lunch. It was suggested by a friend of Becker and agreed upon by the four original members during the 1981–1982 period.

== Career ==
Steve Tesluk (bass) and Frank French (drums) joined the group in 1983, replacing Staydohar and Becker, both of whom left to join True West.

In 1984, a four-track recording with about 14 songs was sent to a number of labels, and an additional demo was recorded in December with Scott Miller producing. At this time, Jozef Becker rejoined the group, replacing French. Lisa Fancher of Frontier Records, who heard of Thin White Rope through a magazine review of the 14-song demo, signed the group to Frontier, and the band then recorded Exploring the Axis.

Over time, the band retained singer/songwriter/guitarist Guy Kyser and guitarist Roger Kunkel, with a changing line-up of drummers and bass guitarists. Like Television, it was noted for its twin guitar attack, innovative use of feedback structures and oblique lyrics. The Rough Guide to Rock called Thin White Rope "one of the few worthwhile traditional American guitar rock bands of their era. While most of the essential groups of the time were pushing back the limits of the form, Thin White Rope had the distinction of managing to breathe new life into the genre."

The band contributed a cover of Roky Erickson's "Burn the Flames" to the 1990 tribute album Where the Pyramid Meets the Eye.

British rock journalist Graeme Thomson attributed the band's 1992 breakup to their having "proved much too idiosyncratic to join the ranks of US breakout alternative bands", citing more successful contemporaries such as R.E.M., The Replacements, American Music Club, and Pixies.

The double live LP The One That Got Away chronicled TWR's last show in Ghent, Belgium, on June 28, 1992. Guitarist Roger Kunkel went on to form the band Acme Rocket Quartet.

== Critical response ==
According to Thomson's 2015 retrospective in The Guardian, Thin White Rope "often made a slightly terrifying sound, but it was beautiful, too. Kyser wrote fantastic melodies, and while his charred voice could out-Beefheart Beefheart, it also possessed a quavering tenderness. Their use of twin guitars was as thrilling and distinctive as anything Thin Lizzy or Television achieved with 12 strings: coiling, concentric lines, overloaded and unfailingly malevolent, with brutally deployed and expertly controlled feedback. They were kind of funny, as well, though it’s impossible to explain why." The albums Moonhead (1987) and In the Spanish Cave (1988) were praised as "remarkable albums, the finest examples of the band’s ability to capture and sustain a mood of roiling, heat-stroked intensity," and the band's later albums Sack Full of Silver (1990) and The Ruby Sea (1991) were cited as "a little patchier, but still mighty."

== Discography ==
Studio Albums

- Exploring the Axis (1985)
- Moonhead (1987)
- In the Spanish Cave (1988)
- Sack Full of Silver (1990)
- The Ruby Sea (1991)

Live Album

- The One That Got Away (1993)

Compilation Albums

- When Worlds Collide (1994)
- Spoor (1995)

EPs

- Bottom Feeders (1987)
- Red Sun (1988)
- Squatter's Rights (1991)

Singles

- "Skinhead" (1988)
- "Ants Are Cavemen" (1991)
- "Eye" (1991)
- "Moonhead (live)" (1993)
