= The Pontiac Brothers =

American hard rock band

The Pontiac Brothers were an American hard rock band formed in 1983.

Ward Dotson founded the Pontiac Brothers after splitting with The Gun Club in 1983. Their debut, Big Black River, was issued in France in 1985, which eventually landed them a Stateside deal with Frontier Records. Doll Hut, their first release for Frontier, featured half the songs from Big Black River and several newly recorded songs. Guitarist Jon Wahl left the group in 1986, shortly before they issued Fiesta en la Biblioteca. After the release of Johnson in 1988, the band went on hiatus, returning in 1992 to release one final album and do a tour of the West Coast. Dotson later played in The Liquor Giants, and Wahl went on to form the group, Claw Hammer.

== Members ==
- Ward Dotson – guitar
- Matt Simon – vocals
- Glen Floyd - guitar
- Jon Wahl - guitar
- Kurt Bauman – bass
- D. A. Valdez – drums

== Discography ==
- Big Black River (Lolita Records, 1985; reissued on Sympathy for the Record Industry)
- Doll Hut (Frontier Records, 1985)
- Fiesta en la Biblioteca (Frontier, 1986)
- Johnson (Frontier, 1988)
- Fuzzy Little Piece of the World (Frontier, 1992)
