= Naked Prey =

American band

- Origin: Tucson, Arizona, United States
- Genres: Alternative rock Desert rock Country rock Cowpunk; Paisley Underground
- Years active: 1982–1996
- Labels: Enigma Records, Down There; Frontier Records; Epiphany
- Past members: Van Christian; David Seeger; Richard Baden; Tommy Larkins; Jason Steed; Pete Holmes

Naked Prey was an American rock band from Tucson, Arizona. United States, which was formed in 1982 by the former Green on Red drummer Van Christian and David Seeger, who had been in the original line-up of the Giant Sandworms (who later became Giant Sand) as well as The Pedestrians, a band credited with having performed the first punk rock show in Tucson. Other artists who recorded or performed with the band included members of Green on Red and the Sand Rubies, John Convertino and Joey Burns, later of Calexico, Chuck Prophet, Rainer Ptacek and longtime drummer Tommy Larkins, who currently plays with Jonathan Richman, famously appearing with him as half of the two-man Greek chorus in There's Something About Mary. Christian himself also performed with The Band of Blacky Ranchette (an occasional project of Giant Sand's Howe Gelb) and was in the original lineup of The Friends of Dean Martinez.

Naked Prey's aggressive, distorted sound was characterized as "rough-edged country rock" and "folk-distorto-rock" and the band was credited with helping to pioneer the guitar-heavy "Desert Rock" sound associated with Tucson in the 1980s and 1990s. The band was also associated with the vaguely psychedelic Paisley Underground scene out of Los Angeles.

In 1984 Naked Prey recorded their first record, produced by Dan Stuart of Green on Red for the Down There label of Steve Wynn (Dream Syndicate). Two subsequent releases were on Los Angeles–based independent label Frontier Records. Though they never achieved commercial success, they, like many Tucson bands, acquired a substantial following in Europe. The band broke up in the late 1990s, but Christian re-unites Naked Prey from time to time for occasional performances.

== Members ==
- Van Christian – Vocals, guitar
- David Seger – Guitar, vocals
- Richard Baden – Bass, vocals
- Tommy Larkins – Drums

== Discography ==
- Naked Prey (1984)
- Under the Blue Marlin (1986)
- 40 Miles from Nowhere (1987)
- Kill the Messenger (1989)
- Live in Tucson (1990)
- Jumbo's Shinebox (1992)
- And then I Shot Everyone (1995)
