= Beth Sorrentino =

American singer-songwriter

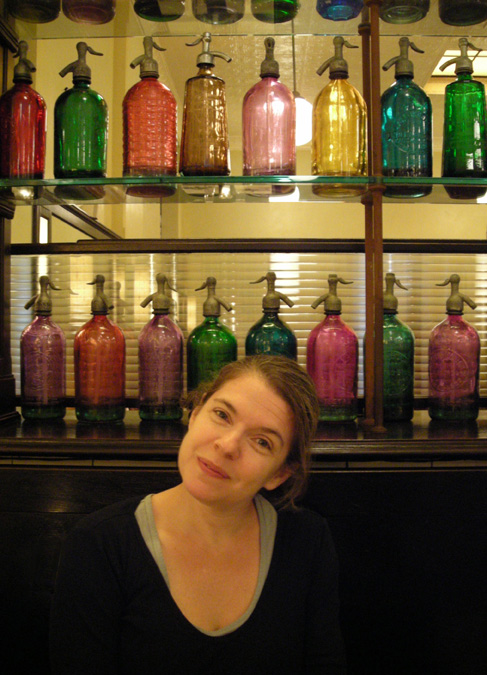
- Sorrentino in 2010

Background information
- Also known as: Beth Sorrentino
- Born: Elizabeth Sorrentino
- Genres: Indie pop, children's music
- Occupations: Singer, composer, recording artist, music teacher
- Instruments: Vocals, piano
- Years active: 1992–present
- Labels: SpinART, Warner Bros., Basta
- Formerly of: Suddenly, Tammy!
- Website: BethSorrentino.com

Elizabeth Sorrentino is an American pianist and singer-songwriter from Lancaster, Pennsylvania. She lives in Los Angeles.

== Suddenly, Tammy! ==
In the early 1990s, Sorrentino, her brother Jay (drums), and high school friend Ken Heitmueller (bass) formed the music trio Suddenly, Tammy!. The band was signed by spinART Records, which released two EPs (Spokesmodel, El Presidente), produced by Sean Slade, and a self-titled debut album. In 1992, the band was featured on the cover of College Music Journal. That same year, Sorrentino contributed backing vocals to the debut album by The Lilys.

Suddenly, Tammy! subsequently signed with Warner Bros. Records, for whom they recorded the album We Get There When We Do, which was produced by Warne Livesey and released in 1995. That same year, Sorrentino made an appearance on the children's TV series Kidsongs. In 1996, the group recorded and released a third album titled, Comet, but the album was shelved after the band was dropped from the label. The trio disbanded in 1997. (Comet was released digitally by an independent label in 2010.)

In 2019, the band reunited for one concert at the Lancaster Roots and Blues Festival. The gig took place at the Chameleon Club, where they often performed during the 1990s.

== Solo career ==
Following the breakup of the band, Sorrentino moved to New York City and became a music teacher. She taught at several schools on the Upper West Side of Manhattan, and was a private piano and vocal instructor.

Sorrentino recorded a series of demos between 2002 and 2003, produced by Irwin Chusid and engineered by Peter Katis at Tarquin Studios, in Bridgeport, Connecticut. The material mostly consisted of new original compositions, with cover versions of two Leonard Cohen songs. After sporadic returns to public performance in New York clubs, Sorrentino approved the demos for digital release in 2006 under the title Nine Songs, One Story. In 2008, two live solo sessions performed and recorded in 2001 at radio station WFMU were released digitally. These sets included a number of Suddenly, Tammy! songs, as well as new original material.

From 2006 to 2011, she composed music for a series of children's theatrical productions at the Lucy Moses School of Manhattan's Kaufman Center.

In 2009, her recording of her original song "Such a Beautiful Day" (a.k.a. "Beautiful Day") was included on The Believer magazine's compilation CD Fantastic And Spectacular, compiled by Daniel Handler.

In 2010, Sorrentino reunited with producer Sean Slade, and over 2010–2011 recorded a collection of songs composed by Sunshine Pop progenitor Curt Boettcher. The completed album, entitled Would You Like To Go, was released on the Netherlands-based Basta label on April 22, 2013, in Europe, and on May 27, 2014, in North America.

Sorrentino recorded a theme song for WFMU radio's weekly conceptual comedy program Seven Second Delay. The composition is an adaptation of the Johnny Rivers hit "Secret Agent Man," with new lyrics and retitled "Andy Breckman Man" (after one of the show's co-hosts). During 2011 and 2012, Sorrentino provided keyboard accompaniment on an intermittent basis at the program's biweekly live broadcasts from the Upright Citizens Brigade Theatre on West 28th Street.

Sorrentino provided hospice care for her mother for over a year; in 2015, following the death of her mother, she relocated to Los Angeles. In 2019, she moved to Brooklyn, New York but has since returned to Los Angeles where she lives, teaches, and writes.

== Discography ==
=== Albums ===
(compositions by Sorrentino except where noted)

- Nine Songs, One Story (2006)
  1. Amazing
  2. Such a Beautiful Day
  3. What I'm On
  4. Very Bad Today
  5. Child
  6. Tighten My Grip
  7. Wave
  8. Famous Blue Raincoat (Cohen)
  9. One Condition
- Hiding Out (2011)
  1. Care of Cell 44 (Argent)
  2. Constellation
  3. 100,000 Fireflies (Merritt)
  4. We Are the Girls
  5. I Want You in My Life (Moore)
  6. Hiding Out
  7. You Never Know (Tweedy)
  8. Back in Kind
  9. Andy Breckman Man
  10. Wishlist
  11. A Rose For Emily (Argent)
  12. Snowday
  13. Lay Down (Candles in the Rain) (Safka)
  14. Hounds of Love (Bush)
  15. End of Another Day
- Would You Like To Go: A Curt Boettcher Songbook (released in Europe April 2013; in North America April 2014)
  1. Would You Like To Go (Boettcher/Alexander)
  2. I Just Want to Be Your Friend (Boettcher)
  3. The Island (Boettcher)
  4. I'm Not Living Here (Boettcher)
  5. You Know I've Found a Way (Boettcher/Mallory)
  6. Baby, Please Don't Go (trad. arr. Boettcher)
  7. Another Time (Boettcher)
  8. Along Comes Mary (Almer)
  9. Prelude (Rhodes/Edgar)
  10. The Know-It-All (Boettcher)
  11. There Is Nothing More To Say (Boettcher/Fennelly/Mallory)
  12. Wearing Levi's (Boettcher)

=== Singles ===
- Swingin' Single (2003) — Comfort Stand Records
  1. Beautiful Day
  2. Amazing
