= Moonhead =

Studio album by Thin White Rope
- Released: February 1987
- Genre: Alternative rock Neo-psychedelia
- Length: 53:45
- Label: Frontier
- Producer: TWR & Paul McKenna

Thin White Rope chronology
Exploring the Axis (1985)	Moonhead (1987)	In the Spanish Cave (1988)

Professional ratings
Review scores
Source	Rating
AllMusic	4.5/5 stars
The Encyclopedia of Popular Music	3/5 stars
The Great Alternative & Indie Discography	8/10
MusicHound Rock: The Essential Album Guide	4/5 stars
OndaRock	7/10
Select	5/5 medals

Moonhead is the second full-length album by Thin White Rope, released in 1987.

== Critical reception ==
Trouser Press wrote that the album "alters the modus operandi a bit, stretching song lengths and forging a provocative, embryonic bond between wiry, Television-styled guitar interplay and groove-conscious kraut-rock rhythms (held in place by Jozef Becker’s incredibly focused drumming)." The Los Angeles Times called the album "excellent," writing that the band's "fuzzy, often dissonant twin-guitar solos recall such diverse groups as Television and Spirit, as its material takes traditional forms and bends them into something unexpected, going from Western gallops to psychedelic dirges."

The Guardian deemed "Crawl Piss Freeze" "not so much a song as an apocalyptic death march," while AllMusic described it as a postcard "from the edge." Spin wrote that the track creates "an unforgiving atmosphere of sparked vocals supplanted by an eardrum-piercing fretboard roar."

== Track listing ==
All tracks are written by Guy Kyser (except where noted).

No.	Title	Length
1.	"Not Your Fault" (Becker/Kyser)	3:45
2.	"Wire Animals"	4:00
3.	"Take It Home"	4:36
4.	"Thing"	2:54
5.	"Moonhead" (Kyser/Becker/Kunkel/Tesluk)	4:45
6.	"Wet Heart"	4:34
7.	"Mother" (Kunkel/Kyser)	4:27
8.	"Come Around"	2:19
9.	"If Those Tears"	3:16
10.	"Crawl Piss Freeze" (Kyser/Kunkel/Tesluk)	5:34
11.	"Waking Up"	2:43
12.	"Valley Of The Bones"	2:54
13.	"Atomic Imagery" (Kyser/Tesluk)	3:36
14.	"Ain't That Lovin' You Baby" (Jimmy Reed)	3:54
15.	"Take It Home (Long Version)"	6:17

== Credits ==
- Guy Kyser – guitar, vocals
- Roger Kunkel – guitar, vocals
- Stephen Tesluk – bass, vocals
- John Von Feldt – bass
- Jozef Becker – drums

with

- Paul McKenna – engineer, producer
- John Golden – Mastering
- Ross Garfield – Drum Technician

and

- Greg Gavin – Cover Painting, Paintings
- Merril Greene – Photography
- Robin K. – Photography
- Wendy Sherman – design
