= Frontier Records =

American independent record label

- Founded: 1980
- Founder: Lisa Fancher
- Genre: Punk, hardcore punk, deathrock, alternative rock, indie rock, progressive metal
- Country of origin: U.S.
- Location: Los Angeles, California
- Official website: www.frontierrecords.com

Frontier Records is an independent record label, started in 1980 in Sun Valley, Los Angeles by Lisa Fancher, a former employee of BOMP! Records and writer of the liner notes for the first album by The Runaways.

== History ==
Frontier Records first found success with the release of the Circle Jerks album Group Sex. The label went on to put out records by such bands as Suicidal Tendencies, American Music Club, Heatmiser, Redd Kross, Thin White Rope, T.S.O.L., Christian Death, and the Young Fresh Fellows, among others.

On November 7, 2010, Frontier Records hosted a party for their 30th anniversary at the Echoplex in Los Angeles which featured a reunion by seminal punk band Middle Class, their first performance in nearly 30 years. The Adolescents, Rikk Agnew, T.S.O.L., the Avengers, and the Flyboys also performed.

== Discography ==
Cat. No.	Artist	Title	Release date	Notes
1001	Flyboys	Flyboys	March 1980	
1002	Circle Jerks	Group Sex	October 1980	
1003	Adolescents	Adolescents	May 1981	a.k.a. The Blue Album
1004	T.S.O.L.	Dance with Me	June 1981	
1005	China White	Danger Zone (EP)	August? 1981	
1006	Choir Invisible	Choir Invisible	November 1981	
1007	Christian Death	Only Theatre of Pain	March 1982	
1008	The Salvation Army	The Salvation Army	May 1982	Later reissued on Frontier 1049 as by Befour Three O'Clock
1009	Rikk Agnew	All by Myself	October 1982	
1010	The Three O'Clock	Baroque Hoedown	October 1982	
1011	Suicidal Tendencies	Suicidal Tendencies	July 1983	
1012	The Three O'Clock	Sixteen Tambourines	October 1983	
1013	The Long Ryders	Native Sons	October 1984	
1014	The Pontiac Brothers	Doll Hut	October 1985	Later reissued as part of Frontier 1047
1015	Thin White Rope	Exploring the Axis	October 1985	
1016	Naked Prey	Under the Blue Marlin	March 1986	
1017	E*I*E*I*O	Land of Opportunity	May 1986	
1018	Redd Kross	Born Innocent	August 1986	
1019	The Pontiac Brothers	Fiesta en la Biblioteca	September 1986	Later reissued as part of Frontier 1047
1020	Thin White Rope	Moonhead	January 1987	
1021	The Young Fresh Fellows	The Men Who Loved Music	1987	
1022	Flying Color	Flying Color	1987	
1023	American Music Club	Engine	1987	
1024	Naked Prey	40 Miles from Nowhere	1987	
1025	EIEIO	That Love Thing	1988	
1026	The Pontiac Brothers	Johnson	1988	
1027	Thin White Rope	In the Spanish Cave	1988	
1028	The Young Fresh Fellows	Totally Lost	1988	
1029	Circle Jerks	Wild in the Streets	1988	Originally released in 1982 by Faulty Products.
1030	Mallet-Head	Mallet-Head	1988	
1031	American Music Club	California	October 1988	
1032	Dharma Bums	Haywire		Reissue. Originally issued on PopLlama
1033	The Damned	Damned Damned Damned	1989	Reissue of band's 1977 debut, originally on Stiff Records.
1034	The Young Fresh Fellows	This One's for the Ladies		
1035	Thin White Rope	Squatter's Rights		
1039	(Various Artists)	Dangerhouse, Volume 1		Compilation of tracks originally issued on Dangerhouse label
1040	Weirdos	Weird World Volume 1		
1041	The Young Fresh Fellows	Electric Bird Digest		
1042	Thin White Rope	The Ruby Sea		
1047	The Pontiac Brothers	Doll House/Fiesta en la Biblioteca		Compilation of Frontier 1014 & 1019.
1048	Thin White Rope	Sack Full of Silver		Reissue. Initially issued on RCA Records.
1049	Befour Three O'Clock	Happen Happened		Reissue of Frontier 1008, with 9 bonus tracks
1050	(Various Artists)	Dangerhouse, Volume 2: Give Me a Little Pain		Compilation of tracks originally issued on Dangerhouse label
1051	Flop	Flop & the Fall of the Mopsqueezer		
1052	Thin White Rope	The One That Got Away		Live recording of band's final concert
1053	The Young Fresh Fellows	It's Low Beat Time		
1054	The Pontiac Brothers	Fuzzy Little Piece of the World	1992	
1055	Jacob's Mouse	No Fish Shop Parking		
1056	Thin White Rope	The Axis Calls (DVD-R)		Concert video
1057	Heatmiser	Dead Air		
1058	Jacob's Mouse	I'm Scared		
1059	Flop	Whenever You're Ready		Reissue of Sony release. Picture disc only.
1060	The Affected	A Fate Worse Than a Fate Worse Than Death		
1061	The Blackeyed Susans	All Souls Alive	1994	
1062	Heatmiser	Yellow No. 5		
1063	Heatmiser	Cop and Speeder		
1064	Thin White Rope	Spoor		Compilation of outtakes, demos, b-sides, and rarities
1065	Sacrilicious	When You Wish Upon a Dead Star		
1066	Shame Idols	I Got Time		
1067	Flop	World of Today		
1068	Meanies	10% Weird	1995	
1069	The Damned	Music for Pleasure		Reissue of band's second 1977 album, originally on Stiff Records.
1071	Shame Idols	Rocket Cat		Marc Webb's first video My Star
1073	The Damned	Not the Captain's Birthday Party?	April 1997	Reissue of live material, originally on Demon Records.
1074	Mummydogs	Mummydogs		
1075	Weirdos	Weird World Volume 2		
1076	Adolescents	Complete Demos 1980-1986		
1077	Flat Worms	Live in Los Angeles		

== See also ==
- List of record labels
