= Now Hear This =

Now Hear This may refer to:

== Music ==
- Now Hear This (The Hi-Lo's album), a 1957 album by The Hi-Lo's
- Now Hear This (Duke Pearson album), a 1968 album by jazz pianist Duke Pearson
- Now Hear This (Hanson album), a 1973 album by British band Hanson
- Now Hear This (Hal Galper album), a 1977 album by jazz pianist Hal Galper
- Now Hear This (Howe II album), a 1991 album by Howe II
- Now Hear This (The Split Squad album), 2014
- Now Hear This (KRS-One album), 2015 album
- Now Hear This (PBS Classical Music TV Series) 2020 (presented by PBS Great Performances)-2 seasons

== Other uses ==
- NHT Loudspeakers, an American electronics company
- Now Hear This, a live storytelling series on Australian ABC Radio, curated by Melanie Tait
- Now Hear This (film), a 1963 cartoon film
- Now hear this (nautical command)
