= The Fleshtones =

American garage rock band

Fleshtones
- The Fleshtones in 2023

Background information
- Origin: Queens, New York, U.S.
- Genres: Rock and roll, garage rock
- Years active: 1976–present
- Labels: Red Star Records (1978–80); I.R.S. Records (1980–85); ROIR; Ichiban Records (1992–98); Telstar Records (1997–99); Yep Roc Records (2003–present)
- Members: Keith Streng; Peter Zaremba; Bill Milhizer; Ken Fox
- Past members: Jan Marek Pakulski; Lenny Calderon; Danny Gilbert; Gordon Spaeth; Mitchell Ames; Walter Scezney; Robert Burke Warren

The Fleshtones are an American garage rock band from Queens, New York, formed in 1976. The band's core of guitarist/vocalist Keith Streng and vocalist/keyboardist Peter Zaremba has remained constant since its founding, with drummer Bill Milhizer joining in 1980 and bassist Ken Fox in 1990; the lineup has been stable since. They describe their blend of garage rock, R&B, and psychedelia as "Super Rock."

Their debut was at CBGB in May 1976, and they were signed to I.R.S. Records in 1980, where they released albums including Roman Gods (1982) and Hexbreaker! (1983). Zaremba hosted I.R.S. Records Presents The Cutting Edge on MTV from 1984 to 1987. Despite a devoted following in the United States and Europe, the band did not achieve significant commercial success and left I.R.S. in the mid 1980s. After a period on Ichiban Records, they signed with Yep Roc Records in 2003, where they have continued to release studio albums. Their career is the subject of Joe Bonomo's authorized biography Sweat: The Story of The Fleshtones, America's Garage Band (2007) and a feature documentary, Pardon Us for Living, But the Graveyard Is Full (2009).

== History ==
=== 1976–1979 ===
The Fleshtones were formed in 1976 in Whitestone, New York, by Keith Streng (born 1955 in New York City) and Jan Marek Pakulski (born 1956 in Lewiston, Maine), two roommates who discovered that a previous tenant had left behind some instruments in the basement of the house they were renting. Streng, on guitar, and Pakulski, on bass, were soon joined by neighborhood friends Peter Zaremba (born 1954 in New York City), on harmonica, keyboards, and vocals, and Lenny Calderon (born 1956 in New York City), on drums. Starting in 1978, the group was often joined onstage by Action Combo, a horn section composed of brothers Gordon and Brian Spaeth (alto sax/harmonica and tenor sax, respectively). Gordon Spaeth (1951–2005) was an official member of The Fleshtones from 1983 to 1988.

They debuted at CBGB on May 19, 1976. In the late 1970s, The Fleshtones earned a local following and played often in Manhattan at CBGB and Max's Kansas City. Later, they found a favorite venue at Club 57 on St. Mark's Place. The Fleshtones were the first band to be booked or to play at several famous venues, including Irving Plaza and Danceteria in Manhattan, Maxwell's in Hoboken, New Jersey, and the original 9:30 Club in Washington, D.C.

Also, they shared a rehearsal space with The Cramps on the Bowery in Manhattan in 1977. The following year, The Fleshtones signed with Marty Thau's Red Star Records, and recorded their first album. In addition, filmmaker/artist M. Henry Jones and the band produced Soul City, a performance-animation video composed of hand-painted cutouts that is a historic representation of the band and Jones' art form. The Fleshtones' first single, titled "American Beat", was issued on Red Star in 1979.

=== 1980–1989 ===
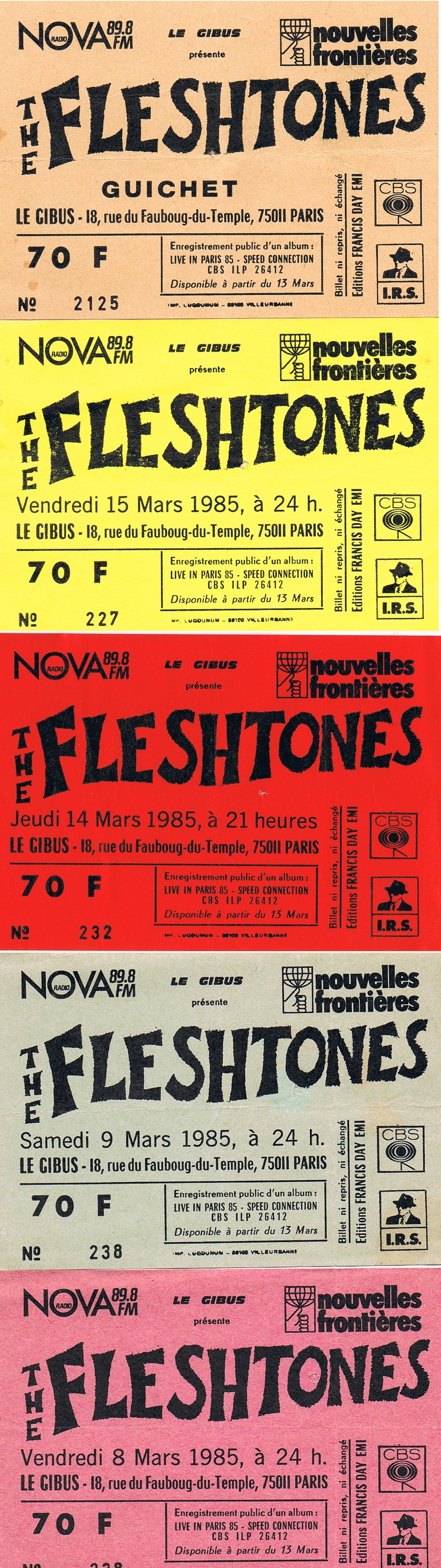
Tickets for the Fleshtones concerts at the Gibus club in Paris, March 1985, where the Speed Connection album was recorded

In 1980, with the Red Star Records album not released (but later issued on cassette on ROIR, and subsequently on CD and vinyl), the Fleshtones were signed by Miles Copeland III at I.R.S. Records, where they worked with producers Richard Mazda and Richard Gottehrer. It was at this time that the band replaced Calderon with drummer Bill Milhizer (born 1948 in Troy, New York), and appeared in the British punk/new wave film Urgh! A Music War, and released its first EP Up-Front. Four albums on I.R.S. followed: Roman Gods (1982), Hexbreaker!! (1983), and the live Speed Connection and Speed Connection II (1985). In 1982, they appeared on Dick Clark's American Bandstand TV show. In 1984 they re-recorded "American Beat" as part of the soundtrack of the Tom Hanks movie Bachelor Party.

Despite having a large cult following, the band never achieved commercial success: Roman Gods debuted at No. 174 on Billboard's album chart, the highest position that a Fleshtones release would attain until 2020, when Face of the Screaming Werewolf debuted at No. 9 on Billboard's Alternative New Artist Albums Chart, and 2021, when the "Mi Engañaste Bien" single entered the Billboard Hot Singles Chart at No. 38.

Zaremba was the host of I.R.S. Records Presents The Cutting Edge on MTV from 1984 to 1987. The I.R.S. Records-produced show featured up and coming underground artists. The program was short-lived but the format prefigured 120 Minutes. Zaremba's MC talents surfaced again in the late 1990s at New York City's "Cavestomp" Garage Rock festivals.

In the mid-1980s, The Fleshtones regularly played at the Pyramid Club on Avenue A in the East Village, and were instrumental in helping to start Wigstock, the drag queen festival that became a New York City staple. In the late 1980s, The Fleshtones were without major-label support, though they continued to tour America and Europe steadily, including shows opening for Chuck Berry and James Brown. In 1987, The Fleshtones made an appearance on the final episode of Andy Warhol's Andy Warhol's Fifteen Minutes, an MTV program, during which they backed up famed English stage actor Ian McKellen as he recited William Shakespeare's Twentieth Sonnet.

The Fleshtones recorded the title track to the 1987 horror comedy film I Was a Teenage Zombie. They released the albums Fleshtones vs. Reality (studio) in 1987 and Soul Madrid (live) in 1989. I.R.S. Records released a best-of compilation, Living Legends, in 1989.

In late 1986, Pakulski left the Fleshtones. He was replaced by Robert Burke Warren, who left the band in 1988. Fred Smith of Television and Andy Shernoff of The Dictators were interim bass players in the studio and on tour until 1990.

=== 1990–2000 ===
Ken Fox (born 1961 in Toronto, Ontario) joined the Fleshtones on bass in July 1990. Fox had formed Raving Mojos in Toronto and played with Joan Osborne and in Jason & the Scorchers. Since Fox joined, the Fleshtones lineup has remained stable.

In 1992, the Fleshtones signed with Ichiban Records, where they stayed until the label's demise. In the 1990s, the Fleshtones worked with musician-producers Dave Faulkner, Peter Buck, and Steve Albini.

=== 2001–2010 ===
In the 21st century, the Fleshtones collaborated with musician-producers Rick Miller, Jim Diamond, Lenny Kaye, and Ivan Julian, as well as self-producing work in Paul Johnson's Compactor basement studio in Brooklyn. The Fleshtones signed with Yep Roc Records in 2003.

The Fleshtones were one of the last bands to play at Windows on the World atop the World Trade Center. In 2002, they played at a Night of Remembrance and Hope festival at CBGB.

In December 2003, the Fleshtones played at a CBGB 30th Anniversary show along with The Dictators, and in August of the next year, played Little Steven's Underground Garage Festival at Randalls Island in New York City with 39 other bands, including The New York Dolls, Iggy Pop, The Strokes, and Bo Diddley.

=== 2010–present ===
In September 2016, the Fleshtones toured China for the first time in the band's career. The tour was organized by Shanghai-based punk band Round Eye. In December 2024, they supported The Damned and Doctor and the Medics on their UK tour., and in January 2026 toured India for the first time in their career.

On August 7, 2026 the Fleshtones played a 50th anniversary show, introduced by Little Steven, at The Bowery Ballroom in New York City. They were joined by Goons and The Minus Five, which featured Scott McCaughey, Steve Wynn, Linda Pitmon, and R.E.M.'s Peter Buck and Mike Mills. Also playing at the performance was founding Fleshtones bass player Marek Pakulski, Lenny Kaye, Ivan Julian, Andy Shernoff, Paul Johnson, Jesse Bates, Mike Giblin, Vibeke Saugestad, Steve Greenfield, Eric Fusco, and others. The show was emceed by writer, editor, and musician Mike Edison.

== Book, tribute, feature documentary and reissues ==
- In 2007, Continuum Books (now Bloomsbury) published Sweat: The Story of The Fleshtones, America's Garage Band, an authorized biography by Joe Bonomo. Camion Blanc released a French-language edition, The Fleshtones: Histoire d'un Groupe Garage Américain, in 2012.
- Vindicated! A Tribute to The Fleshtones was released in 2007 on vinyl by Larsen Records (France) and on CD by Dirty Water Records (UK). The album features 23 international bands (including Hoodoo Gurus, the Nomads with Handsome Dick Manitoba, the Slickee Boys, the Woggles, Snax, the Swingin' Neckbreakers, Richard Mazda, the Subway Surfers, the Insomniacs, and others) covering songs spanning the Fleshtones' career.
- Pardon Us For Living, But The Graveyard's Full,, a feature documentary directed by Geoffray Barbier based on Joe Bonomo's biography Sweat: The Story of The Fleshtones, America's Garage Band, was released from Cold Cuts Productions in 2009.
- In 2010, the Australian label Raven released a CD compilation of the Fleshtones' I.R.S. Records material entitled It's "Super-Rock" Time!: The IRS Years 1980–1985 and a Hexbreaker! / Speed Connection CD.

== Members ==
- Keith Streng — guitar & vocals (1976–present)
- Peter Zaremba — lead vocals, harmonica & organ (1976–present)
- Bill Milhizer — drums & vocals (1980–present)
- Ken Fox — bass & vocals (1990–present)

Former members

- Jan Marek Pakulski — bass, vocals (1976–79, 1979–86)
- Lenny Calderon — drums, vocals (1976–79)
- Danny Gilbert — guitar (1976)
- Gordon Spaeth — sax, harmonica, organ, vocals (1978–88)
- Mitchell Ames — guitar (1979)
- Walter Scezney — bass (1979)
- Robert Burke Warren — bass, vocals (1986–88)

Session/Touring

- Clem Burke – drums (1979)
- Fred Smith — bass, vocals (1988–89)
- Andy Shernoff — bass, vocals (1989–90)

Horn players

- Brian Spaeth — sax (1978–81)
- Gregory D Grinnell — trumpet (1986)
- Ken Fradley — trumpet (1988)
- Mark McGowan — trumpet (1988–90)
- Steve Greenfield — sax (1988–92)
- Joe Loposky — trumpet (1990–94)
- Markus Arike — sax (1992–94)

Timeline

== Discography ==
=== Studio albums ===
- Blast Off! [recorded in 1978] (1982) (ROIR) cassette + CD (ROIR) 1990 + CD (ROIR/Fr. Danceteria) 1993 + CD (Red Star) 1997 + LP (Sp. Munster) 2001 + LP (Get Hip Records) 2002
- Roman Gods (1982) [LP/cassette (I.R.S.) 1982 + CD [limited] (Eur. I.R.S.) 1990]
- Hexbreaker! (1983) [LP/cassette (I.R.S.)]
- Fleshtones vs. Reality (1987) [LP/cassette/CD (Emergo)]
- Powerstance! (1991) [CD/LP/cassette (Aus. Trafalgar) 1991 + CD/LP/cassette (UK Big Beat ) 1991 + CD (Naked Language/Ichiban) 1992 + download (Ichiban) 2006]
- Beautiful Light (1994) [(Naked Language/Ichiban also Forever Fleshtones – Gr. Hitch Hyke)]
- Laboratory of Sound (1995) [CD (Ichiban International) 1995 + LP (Gr. Hitch Hyke) 1996 + download (Ichiban) 2006]
- Hitsburg USA! (1996) [LP (Telstar Records) + CD (Sp. Imposible) also Fleshtones Favorites CD (Flesh)]
- More Than Skin Deep (1997) [CD (Ichiban International) 1997 + LP (Telstar) 1997 + CD/LP (Eur. Epitaph) 1999 + download (Ichiban) 2006]
- Hitsburg Revisited (1999) [CD (Telstar) + CD/LP (Eur. Epitaph)]
- Solid Gold Sound (2001) [CD/LP (Blood Red) + CD (Fr. Fantastika) + download (Blood Red) 2009]
- Do You Swing? (2003) [CD/LP (YepRoc)]
- Beachhead (2005) [CD/LP (YepRoc) 2005 + LP (It. Nicotine)]
- Take A Good Look (2008) [CD/LP (YepRoc)]
- Stocking Stuffer (2008) [CD/LP (YepRoc)]
- Brooklyn Sound Solution with Lenny Kaye (2011) [CD/LP (YepRoc)]
- Wheel Of Talent (2014) [CD/LP (YepRoc)]
- The Band Drinks For Free (2016) [CD/LP (YepRoc)]
- Face Of The Screaming Werewolf (2020) [CD/LP (YepRoc)]
- It's Getting Late (...and More Songs About Werewolves) (2024) [CD/LP (YepRoc)]

=== Live albums ===
- Speed Connection: Live In Paris 85 (1985) LP (Fr. I.R.S.)
- Speed Connection II – The Final Chapter (Live In Paris 85) (1985) LP/cassette (I.R.S.) 1985 + download (I.R.S.) 2010
- Soul Madrid (1989) LP (Sp. Imposible)
- Live at Yep Roc 15: The Fleshtones (2020) [digital (YepRoc)]

=== Singles ===
- American Beat b/w Critical List (1979) - 7" (Red Star)
- The Girl from Baltimore b/w Feel the Heat (1980) - 7" (I.R.S.)
- The World Has Changed b/w All Around the World (1981) - 7" (I.R.S.)
- Ride Your Pony b/w Roman Gods (1982) - 7" (I.R.S.)
- Roman Gods [Dance Remix] b/w Ride Your Pony + Chinese Kitchen (1982) - 12" (I.R.S.)
- Shadow-Line b/w All Around the World (1982) - 7" (I.R.S.)
- Right Side of a Good Thing b/w (Legend Of A) Wheelman (1983) - 7" (I.R.S.)
- Screamin' Skull b/w Burnin' Hell (1983) - 7" (I.R.S.)
- American Beat '84 b/w Hall of Fame (1984) - 7" (I.R.S.)
- Armed and Dangerous b/w Let It Rip + Electric Mouse (1991) - 7" (UK Big Beat)
- Beautiful Light ["Big Mix"] + Treat Me Like a Man + Mushroom Cloud (1994) - CD (Naked Language)
- Take a Walk with The Fleshtones b/w One of Us (1994) - 7" (Naked Language)
- Gentleman's Twist b/w Red Sunset + Gentleman's Twist (featuring Alan Vega) (1998) - 7" (Eur. Epitaph)
- Jetset Fleshtones b/w Les Temps Dira (2007) - 7" (YepRoc)
- Bite of My Soul b/w Remember The Ramones (2011) - 7" (YepRoc)
- I Can't Hide b/w B-Side (2011) - 7" (YepRoc)
- For a Smile (featuring Mary Huff) b/w Everywhere Is Nowhere (featuring Mary Huff) (2013) - 7" (YepRoc)
- Available b/w Let's Live (2013) 7" – (YepRoc)
- Gotta Get Away b/w 2000 Light Years from Home (Los Straitjackets) (2015) - 7" (Norton)
- I Surrender! b/w Dominique Laboubee (2015) - 7" (YepRoc)
- The End of My Neighborhood b/w Cardboard Casanova (2016) - 7" (YepRoc)
- The Band Drinks for Free b/w Love My Lover (2016) - 7" (YepRoc)
- Ama Como Un Hombre b/w Ama Mas (2016) - 7" (YepRoc)
- Layin' Pipe b/w Lady Nightshade (2019) - 7" (YepRoc)
- Lost on Xandu b/w 'Lost on Xandu (Version) with Lenny Kaye (2019) - 7" (YepRoc)
- Santa Claus Conquers the Martians (Milton DeLugg & The Little Eskimos) b/w Hooray for Santa Claus (2020) - 7" (Modern Harmonic)
- Mi Engañaste Bien b/w Decimos Yeah! (2021) - 7" (YepRoc)
- Festa di Frankenstein b/w The Dedication Song (2024) - 7" (YepRoc)
- Float Your Showboat b/w Hear Today (2026) - 7" (YepRoc)

=== EPs ===
- Up-Front (I.R.S.) 1980
- American Beat '84 (Fr. I.R.S.) 1984
- Los Fleshtones: Quatro x Quatro (Yep Roc) 2012

=== Compilations ===
- The Fleshtones: Living Legends Series CD (I.R.S.) 1989
- Angry Years 1984–1986 CD (Sp. Imposible) 1994 + CD (Amsterdamned) 1997
- It's "Super-Rock" Time!: The IRS Years 1980–85 CD (Aus. Raven) 2010
- Hexbreaker! / Speed Connection CD (Aus. Raven) 2010
- Roman Gods / Up-Front / Speed Connection II CD (Aus. Raven) 2011
- Budget Buster: Just the Hits! CD/LP (YepRoc) 2017

=== Selected compilation appearances ===
- Marty Thau Presents 2 X 5 (Red Star Records) 1980 + 2005
- Start Swimming (Stiff Records) 1981
- Bachelor Party (OST I.R.S.) 1984 + (Superfecta Records) 2003
- 688 Presents (688 Records) 1986
- I Was a Teenage Zombie (OST Columbia Records) 1987
- Time Bomb: Fleshtones Present the Big Bang Theory (Skyclad Records) 1988
- New York Rockers: Manhattan's Original Rock Underground (ROIR) 1989
- Shangri-La: A Tribute to The Kinks (Imaginary Records) 1989
- Turban Renewal: A Tribute to Sam the Sham & The Pharaohs (Norton Records) 1994
- Dictators Forever Forever Dictators: A Tribute to The Dictators, Vol. 1 (Roto Records) 1996
- Super Bad @ 65: A Tribute to James Brown (Zero Hour) 1998
- Guitar Ace: Tribute to Link Wray (Musick Recordings) 2003
- Children of Nuggets: Original Artyfacts from the Second Psychedelic Era, 1976–1995 (Rhino) 2005
- Little Steven's Underground Garage Presents: The Coolest Songs In The World Vol. 3 (Wicked Cool Records) 2007
- So Indie It Hurts: Roir Rocks Volume Two (ROIR) 2010
- Mondo Zombie Boogaloo (YepRoc) 2013

== Videos and DVDs ==
- "Right Side of a Good Thing," The Beast of I.R.S. Video Vol. 1 VHS (I.R.S. Home Video) 1984
- "F-f-fascination," Back in the Day: Live at Hurrah's New York City DVD (WEA) 2006
- The Fleshtones: Brooklyn à Paris! Live at La Maroquinerie DVD (Big Enough) 2006
- The Fleshtones—Live at the Hurrah Club DVD (Cherry Red) 2008
- Pardon Us for Living, but The Graveyard Is Full (Cold Cut Productions) 2009

== Side projects ==
- Peter Zaremba's Love Delegation
- Full Time Men (Streng's side band which featured Peter Buck)
- The Tall Lonesome Pines (Pakulski's side band with George Gilmore)
- The Master Plan (Streng's side band with Milhizer, Paul Johnson, and Andy Shernoff)
- The Split Squad (Streng's side band with Clem Burke, Eddie Munoz, Michael Giblin, and Josh Kantor).
- Strengsbrew (Streng's Sweden-based side band with Robert Erikson of The Hellacopters, Jim Heneghan of The Solution, and Måns P. Månsson of The Maggots)
