= Speed Connection II – The Final Chapter (Live in Paris 85) =

Live album by The Fleshtones
- Released: September 1985
- Recorded: March 7, 1985
- Venue: The Gibus Club, Paris, France
- Genre: Punk rock, garage rock
- Label: I.R.S. Records
- Producer: Henri Padovani, Robert Singerman

The Fleshtones chronology
Hexbreaker! (1983)	Speed Connection II – The Final Chapter (Live in Paris 85) (1985)	Fleshtones vs. Reality (1987)

Speed Connection II – The Final Chapter (Live in Paris 85) is a live album by the Fleshtones. The album was recorded live at The Gibus Club, Paris, France on March 7, 1985. The band were booked to play nine shows at the club over a two-week span, in two segments (March 5–9 and March 13–16). The opening band for these shows were Les Playboys.

The band had recorded the first show (March 5, 1985) and – at the urging of the French division of I.R.S. Records' vice-president Henri Padovani – subsequently rush-released it to sell at the venue during their two-week stay. The record was titled Speed Connection: Live in Paris 85 (ILP 26412) and was only released in France. However the band was unhappy with the record as lead singer Peter Zaremba had a severe case of laryngitis the night that show was recorded.

The band owed the American I.R.S. Records one more record to fulfil their contractual obligations. In September 1985 the label released Speed Connection II – The Final Chapter (Live in Paris 85) – a recording of their third night (3/7/85) at the Gibus Club. "Return to the Haunted House" was actually an unreleased demo recording produced by Pakulski with canned applause added later. The same recording also later appeared (minus the canned applause) on the Angry Years 84–86 compilation album on Impossible Records in 1993.

The album contained many cover versions of songs by other artists. "Trouble" and "Haunted House" by the Kingsmen, "Wind Out" by R.E.M., "La La La La Reprise" by the Blendells, "When the Night Falls" by the Eyes, "Twelve Months Later" by The Sheep (the Strangeloves under a pseudonym) and "Hide & Seek" by Bunker Hill.

The cover artwork was by Peter Zaremba.

AllMusic note about the album, "it comes close enough to be one of their most purely enjoyable albums."

== Track listing ==
All songs by Peter Zaremba and Keith Streng, except as indicated.

Side one

1. "Hide & Seek" (Bunker Hill) – 2:36
2. "Watch This" (Gordon Spaeth, Keith Streng, Peter Zaremba) – 2:19
3. "Kingsmen-Like Medley" – 4:16
  - "Trouble (Is Her Middle Name)" (Arthur Resnick, Joey Levine)
  - "Hauted Castle" (Lynn Easton)
  - "Twelve Months Later" (Bob Feldman, Jerry Goldstein, Richard Gottehrer)
4. "Return to the Haunted House" – 2:15
5. "Hope Come Back" – 1:52
6. "B.Y.O.B. – 2:22

Side two

1. "One More Time" (Streng) – 2:58
2. "The Dreg" – 3:23
3. "Extended Super Rock Medley" – 9:14
  - "Stop Fooling Around" (Zaremba)
  - "Theme from the Vindicators" (Zaremba)
  - "Hexbreaker" (The Fleshtones)
  - "Roman Gods" (The Fleshtones)
4. "When the Night Falls" (T-Bone Burnett) – 3:10
5. "Wind Out" (Ayers, Berry, Buck, Mills, Stipe) – 2:17
6. "La La La La Reprise" (The Blendells) – 1:55

== Personnel ==
The Fleshtones

- Bill Milhizer – drums
- Jan Marek "Buck" Pakulski – bass, vocals
- Gordon Spaeth – saxophone
- Keith Streng "The Beautiful Angel" – guitar, vocals
- Count Peter Zaremba – vocals, harmonica, organ and cover illustration

Additional personnel

- Geoff Blythe – tenor saxophone
- Sid Gould – trumpet
- Peter Buck – guitar on "When the Night Falls" and "Wind Out".
- Richard Gottehrer – producer "An Instant Record"
- James A. Ball – mixer, engineer
- Lauren Thibaut – engineer [Additional]
- Richard Dumas – photography
- Robert Singerman – executive producer
- Henri Padovani – executive producer
