= The Split Squad =

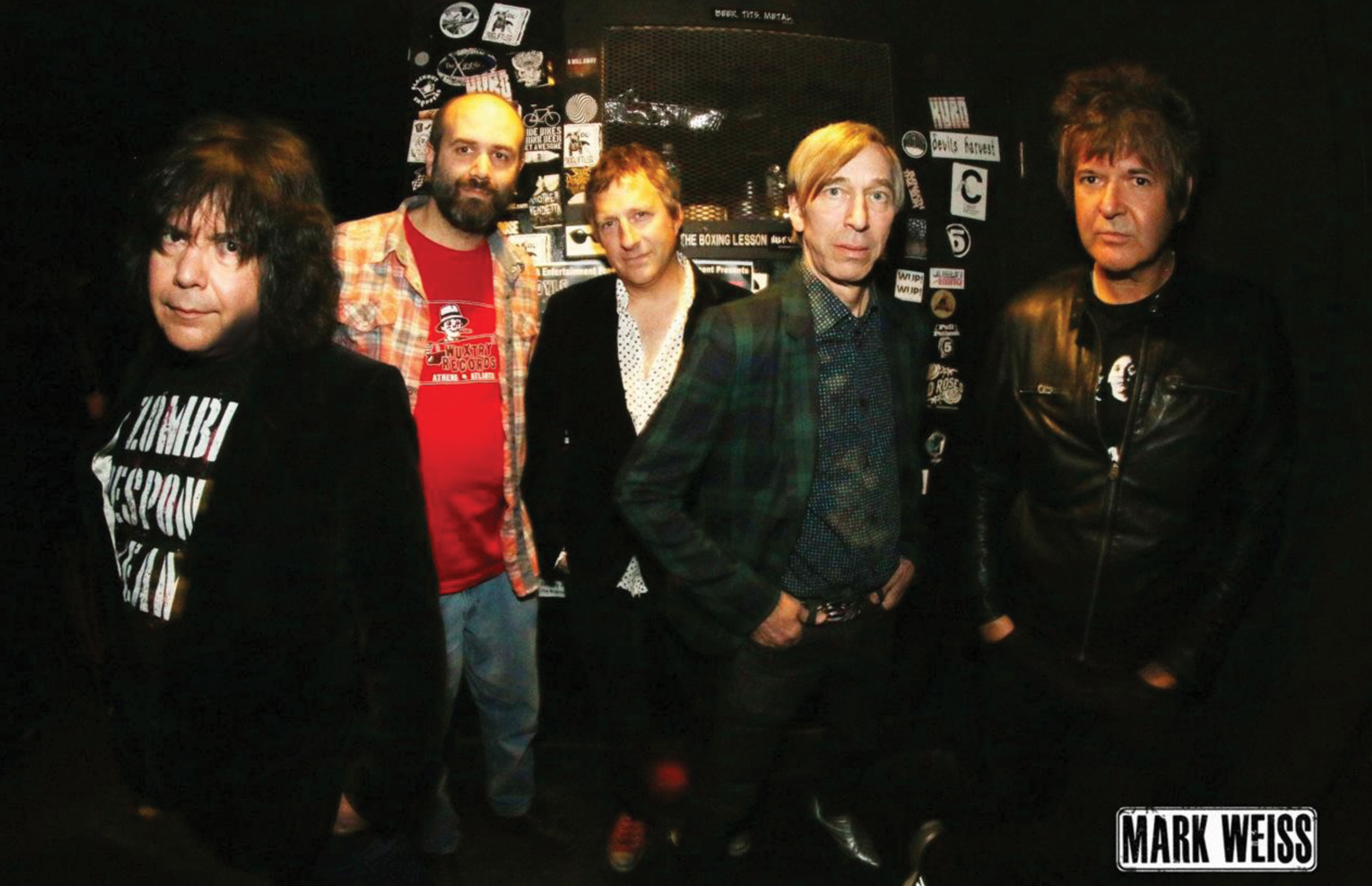
- The Split Squad at the Brighton Bar, Long Branch, NJ, April 28, 2014.

Background information
- Origin: New York City, United States
- Genres: Rock and roll, garage rock, blues rock, Paisley Underground, power pop, pop music
- Years active: 2012–present
- Labels: Red Chuck Records, Closer Records, FOLC
- Members: Michael Giblin, Josh Kantor, Eddie Munoz, Keith Streng
- Past members: Clem Burke
- Website: www.thesplitsquad.com

The Split Squad is a Rock and Roll band composed of Michael Giblin (bass/vocals), Josh Kantor (keyboards), Eddie Munoz (guitar/backing vocals), and Keith Streng (guitar/vocals). Some members came to the public's attention in other bands: Kantor with The Baseball Project, Munoz with The Plimsouls, Streng with The Fleshtones, and, before his death, Clem Burke with Blondie. Since many of the members of the band follow baseball, Annie Laurent Streng, Keith Streng's former wife, proposed the band's name. The term refers to a practice used during Major League Baseball's Spring training.

== Formation ==
The formation of The Split Squad can be attributed to the friendship Parallax Project bandleader Giblin had with Munoz of The Plimsouls, and Giblin's inclination to work collaboratively with other musicians. Giblin and Munoz had worked together off and on through the 1990s, and rekindled their friendship in the mid-2000s during a SXSW Festival. This led to Giblin organizing an East Coast tour for The Plimsouls in 2006. A few years later, Giblin organized several shows where Parallax Project shared the bill with Magic Christian and The Fleshtones. This brought Giblin into close contact with Burke and Streng. Over the course of that tour, Streng and Giblin started talking about forming a new band. Munoz enthusiastically endorsed the formation, and joined as the second guitarist. Burke liked everyone involved and agreed to join. Around the same time, Giblin had become friends with Josh Kantor, keyboardist in Jim's Big Ego, a band he'd arranged to have perform in Harrisburg, PA. Later, Parallax Project shared the bill with The Baseball Project, which Kantor also was in, so when the band was recording the album in David Minehan's Woolly Mammoth studio in Boston, they contacted Kantor, who added keyboards to some of the tracks. Kantor tours with the rest of the band when show dates don't interfere with his job as the Fenway Park organist for the Boston Red Sox. The Split Squad made their live debut on March 16 at the 2013 SXSW Festival.

A number of notable underground rock personalities have sat in with them at various gigs across the United States, including Peter Zaremba, Chuck Prophet, Steve Wynn, Peter Buck, Jason Victor, Amy Gore, Nikki Corvette, Andy Babiuk, and Brian Hurd (aka Daddy Long Legs).

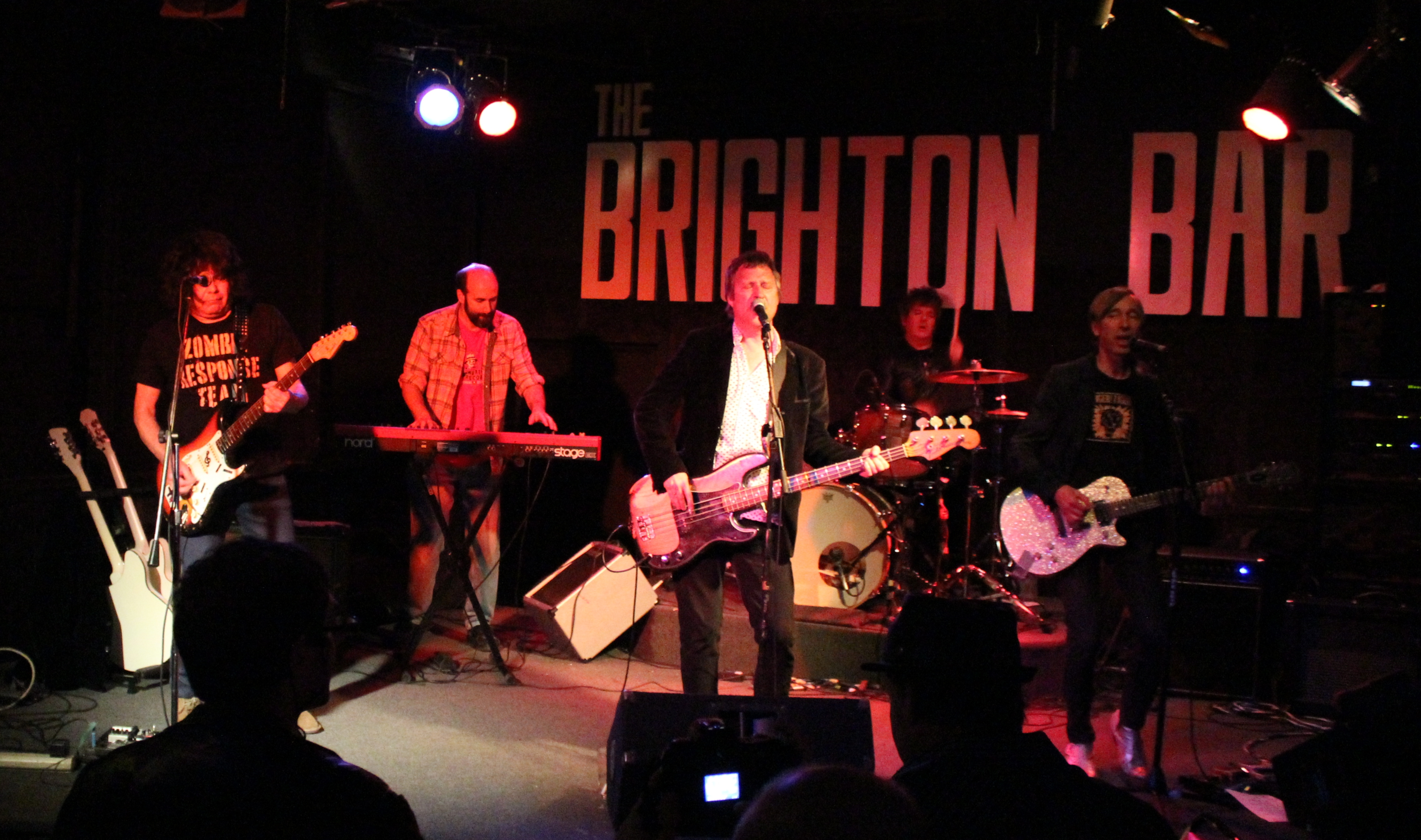
The Split Squad performing at the Brighton Bar, Long Branch, NJ, on April 28, 2014

== Tours ==
The Split Squad has performed at both the 2013 and 2014 South By Southwest music festivals. From Nov. 9 - Nov. 15, 2013 the band launched the "West Of Wherever Tour 2013" with The Fleshtones, touring cities in California, Seattle WA, Vancouver BC Canada, ending with a Big Bang-Up in Portland OR. From early March through late April 2014, the band played venues on the East Coast, with appearances at SXSW sandwiched between. This tour included a live performance on the Evan "Funk" Davies show in the studios of WFMU. Their 13 date "Summer 2014 Tour", from July 3 - August 3, 2014, starting in the Midwest, then touring up the East Coast, the Mid-Atlantic, and Toronto and Hamilton, ON Canada. The early (July 3–6) Split Squad shows on this tour had Florent Barbier on drums, as Burke was on tour with Blondie. Linda Pitmon, like Barbier, also filled in on drums when Burke was unavailable. The band had a short tour of the Northeast in the Spring of 2015 and has begun touring again in the Winter of 2016, as discussed below. Reviews of their shows have been uniformly positive.

== Activities ==
In August 2014, the group returned to Boston and the Woolly Mammoth Studio to record an original Christmas song, "Another Lonely Christmas”, that was released in the Fall of 2014 as part of a compilation album, "A Kool Kat Kristmas Volume 2". Proceeds benefited the Susan Giblin Foundation for Animal Wellness and Welfare. On 3 December 2015, the band website announced that their debut record was now being distributed by the French independent label Closer Records. During the 13 February 2016 concert at The Windup Space in Baltimore, MD, bandleader Michael Giblin announced that an EP of new material would be released in 2016. Two songs on the EP will be "Stop Me (If You've Heard This One Before", penned by Giblin, debuted the night before at the Harrisburg Midtown Arts Center, Harrisburg, PA, and the Keith Streng-penned "Showstopper". For the two concert series with the Paul Collins Beat, drummer Florent Barbier filled in for Clem Burke, who was in studio, recording the next Blondie album. A 3 date tour in late March 2016 was with The Fleshtones. During summer 2019, they toured with Southern Culture on the Skids.

== Discography ==
=== Albums ===
- Now Hear This... (2014) RCO1311 (vinyl) RCO1321 (CD) Closer Records CL135
- Another Cinderella (2021) FOLC 168

=== Album compilations ===
- "Teenarama" on Starry Eyed ~ The Records Tribute Zero Hour Records (released June 9, 2013)
- "Another Lonely Christmas" on A Kool Kat Kristmas Volume 2 PURR2050 Kool Kat Musik (released November 3, 2014)

== Members ==
- Michael Giblin - lead vocals & bass guitar
- Josh Kantor - keyboards
- Eddie Munoz - backing vocals & guitar
- Keith Streng - Vocals & guitar

Bullpen

- Florent Barbier - drums
- Scott McCaughey - vocals & guitar
- Linda Pitmon - drums
