= Roman Gods (album) =

Studio album by The Fleshtones
- Released: January 7, 1982
- Recorded: Skyline Studios NYC, June 1981 (except "The World Has Changed", RKO Studios, London, February 1981)
- Genre: Punk rock, garage rock
- Length: 34:00
- Label: IRS
- Producer: Richard Mazda

The Fleshtones chronology
Up-Front EP (1980)	Roman Gods (1982)	Hexbreaker! (1983)

Professional ratings
Review scores
Source	Rating
AllMusic	4.5/5 stars
Christgau's Record Guide	B+
Record Mirror	4/5 stars
Rolling Stone	4/5 stars
Smash Hits	8/10

Roman Gods is the first album by The Fleshtones. The album was produced by Richard Mazda and largely recorded at Skyline Studios in New York City in June 1981, with the exception of one track ("The World Has Changed"), which was recorded at RKO Studios in London in February 1981. The record sleeve was designed by lead singer Peter Zaremba.

Trouser Press called Roman Gods a "big leap forward" from the band's debut EP Up-Front, noting that it adds "new personality and passion to the beat".

The song "Shadow-line (to J. Conrad)" was performed by The Fleshtones in the concert film Urgh! A Music War.

== Track listing ==
Side one
No.	Title	Writer(s)	Length
1.	"The Dreg (Fleshtone-77)"	Keith Streng, Peter Zaremba	3:17
2.	"I've Gotta Change My Life"	Keith Streng, Peter Zaremba	2:32
3.	"Stop Fooling Around!"	Peter Zaremba	4:06
4.	"Hope Come Back"	Keith Streng, Peter Zaremba	2:25
5.	"The World Has Changed"	Keith Streng, Peter Zaremba	3:10

Side two
No.	Title	Writer(s)	Length
1.	"R-I-G-H-T-S"	Keith Streng, Peter Zaremba	2:32
2.	"Let's See the Sun"	Peter Zaremba	2:40
3.	"Shadow-line (to J. Conrad)"	Keith Streng, Peter Zaremba	3:13
4.	"Chinese Kitchen"	Keith Streng, Gordon Spaeth	2:12
5.	"Ride Your Pony"	N. Neville	3:21
6.	"Roman Gods"	The Fleshtones	4:40

== Personnel ==
The Fleshtones

- Bill Milhizer – drums
- Jan Marek Pakulski – bass guitar
- Keith Streng – guitar
- Gordon Spaeth – alto saxophone, harmonica, art direction
- Peter Zaremba – vocals, illustrations, design

Additional musicians and production

- David Arnoff – photography
- Carl Grasso – illustrations
- David Lichtenstein – engineering
- Richard Mazda – production
- Dave Le Neve-Foster – engineering on "The World Has Changed"
- Arthur Payson – engineering
- John Weiss – tenor saxophone

== Charts ==
Album

Year	Chart	Position
1982	The Billboard 200	174

Single

Year	Single	Chart	Position
1982	"Roman Gods/Ride Your Pony"	Billboard Dance Music/Club Play Singles	29
