= Laboratory of Sound =

Studio album by the Fleshtones
- Released: 1995
- Recorded: May 1995
- Genre: Rock
- Label: Ichiban
- Producer: Steve Albini

The Fleshtones chronology
Beautiful Light (1994)	Laboratory of Sound (1995)	Hitsburg USA! (1996)

Laboratory of Sound is an album by the American band the Fleshtones, released in 1995. They supported it with a North American tour. The album sold around 20,000 copies in its first decade of release.

== Production ==
Recorded over two weeks in May 1995, the album was produced by Steve Albini. "High on Drugs" was first recorded by guitarist Keith Streng's band with Peter Buck, Full Time Men. The band, for the first time, wrote about their experiences, with "We'll Never Forget" a tribute to the music scene that had sustained the Fleshtones for almost 20 years. An unlisted 69th track, "I Don't Live Today", is a cover of the Jimi Hendrix Experience song.

== Critical reception ==
Professional ratings
Review scores
Source	Rating
The Age	2/5 stars
All Music Guide to Rock	2/5 stars
Alternative Rock	3/10
The Encyclopedia of Popular Music	3/5 stars
The Great Indie Discography	5/10
MusicHound Rock: The Essential Album Guide	3/5 stars

The Advocate called the Fleshtones "the B-movie version of the Ramones." Stereo Review praised the "loud, funny, kinetic set of Sixties-styled garage rockers", but criticized Albini's production, saying that "doubtless he had some rigorous alterna-rock theoretical reason for why the sound lacks conspicuous oomph." The Age deemed it "a good, straight up rock 'n' roll album, sticking to the same old garage/soul/swamp". The Telegraph & Argus opined that "the tunes simply aren't there" to support the "low-fi type of sound".

The Trouser Press Guide to '90s Rock concluded that "the monochromatic rock performances of constricted melodies leaves Laboratory—the casualty of inadequate preparation and overly casual execution—a disappointing write-off."

== Track listing ==
No.	Title	Length
1.	"Let's Go!"
2.	"High on Drugs"
3.	"Sands of Our Lives"
4.	"Nostradamus Jr."
5.	"The Sweetest Thing"
6.	"Hold You"
7.	"Accelerated Emotion"
8.	"Train of Thought"
9.	"One Less Step"
10.	"A Motor Needs Gas"
11.	"Psychedelic Swamp"
12.	"Fading Away"
13.	"We'll Never Forget"
69.	"I Don't Live Today"
