= Hexbreaker! =

Studio album by the Fleshtones
- Released: 1983
- Recorded: March 1983
- Studios: Skyline, New York City
- Genres: Punk, garage rock
- Label: IRS
- Producer: Richard Mazda

The Fleshtones chronology
| Roman Gods (1982) | Hexbreaker! (1983) | Fleshtones vs. Reality (1987) |

Hexbreaker! is an album by the Fleshtones, released in 1983.

== Production ==
The album was recorded at NYC's Skyline Studios, in March 1983, and was produced by Richard Mazda. All the songs were composed by the band, with the exception of "Burning Hell", a cover of a John Lee Hooker song. A dance remix was made of the title track with engineer David Lichtenstein and retitled "Super Hexbreaker"; it later appeared on the European EP of "American Beat '84".

The record sleeve was designed by lead singer Peter Zaremba, with Carl Grasso, George Dubrose and Richard Mazda, and featured "fey devil photos" by Dubrose. The back cover of the original LP displayed the following message:

"The theme of this album is NEW, because after all, this is the FLESHTONES newest LP. And not only is it their newest but it's also their wildest, most emphatic, most super-rock record yet! It's been said that the FLESHTONES aren't just a pop group but an outlook, a way of life. But - although a lot of things have been said about the FLESHTONES, you'll agree that their new hexbreaking record album renders all praise not only superfluous, but unnecessary. The Guys"

Singles were released in Europe for "Right Side of a Good Thing" and "Screamin' Skull". A promotional music video was made for "Right Side of a Good Thing".

== Critical reception ==
Professional ratings
Review scores
| Source | Rating |
|---|---|
| AllMusic | 4/5 stars |
| Robert Christgau | B− |
| The Encyclopedia of Popular Music | 4/5 stars |
| The Rolling Stone Album Guide | 3/5 stars |

Maximum Rocknroll thought that "great tunes like 'New Scene' and 'Screamin’ Skull' are emasculated by a slick, squeaky-clean sound." Trouser Press called the album "an ultimate ’80s garage-rock classic" and "an exuberant collection of memorable numbers made even better by brilliant playing and spot-on production by Richard Mazda." The New York Times called it "a delightful surprise, a disk that captures the raw excitement of a Fleshtones performance while suggesting that life can add up to more than a round of parties."

The Morning Call deemed the album a "bona-fide" classic. In 2004, Hexbreaker! was one of ten representative albums included in Spin's "garage rock" record guide list.

== Track listing ==
All songs by Peter Zaremba and Keith Streng, except as indicated.

Side one

1. "Deep in My Heart" (Zaremba)
2. "What's So New (About You)"
3. "Screamin' Skull"
4. "Legend of a Wheelman" (Spaeth)
5. "New Scene" (Zaremba)
6. "Hexbreaker" (Fleshtones)

Side two

1. "Right Side of a Good Thing" (Zaremba)
2. "Brainstorm"
3. "This House Is Empty" (Pakulski, Zaremba)
4. "Want!"
5. "Burning Hell" (J.L. Hooker, B.Besman)

== Personnel ==
The Fleshtones

- Peter Zaremba — vocals, maracas
- Keith Streng — guitar, vocals, "world famous orchestra leader"
- Bill Milhizer — drums
- Jan Marek Pakulski — bass, vocals, "thanks for just being you"
- Gordon Spaeth — organ, harmonica, saxophone

Additional personnel

- John Weiss — tenor saxophone
- Peter Doyle — trumpet
- Richard Mazda — producer, also played various unspecified instruments
- David Lichtenstein — engineer
- Roger Moutenot — assistant
- Paul Shook — assistant
- Avi Kipper — engineer
- Frank DeLuna — mastering
