= I Was a Teenage Zombie =

1987 film

- Directed by: John Elias Michalakis
- Written by: James Aviles Martin; (additional scenes and dialogue by): George Seminara
- Produced by: Richard Hirsh; John Elias Michalakis
- Starring: Michael Rubin; Steve McCoy; George Seminara; Robert C. Sabin; Peter Bush; Allen Lewis Rickman; Kevin Nagle; Cassie Madden
- Cinematography: Peter Lewnes
- Edited by: John Elias Michalakis
- Music by: Jonathan Roberts; Craig Seeman
- Production company: Periclean Motion Pictures
- Distributed by: Horizon Films; Charter Entertainment
- Release date: July 1987
- Running time: 90 minutes
- Country: United States
- Language: English

I Was a Teenage Zombie is a 1987 American comedy horror film.

== Plot ==
The film begins with teens looking to purchase some marijuana. The film plays with comedy horror conventions, when a drug dealer is pushed into the river and becomes a zombie.

== Production ==
The film was shot on location in and around New York City, especially Brooklyn, Fort Lee, Englewood, Tenafly, Riverside Park, and Rockland County. Some of the scenes near the beginning of the film were shot at Brooklyn College in Flatbush, Brooklyn.

== Original Motion Picture Soundtrack ==
The film's title track was recorded by the American band The Fleshtones, and the subsequent video was given rotation on MTV. Other bands and artists appearing on the film's soundtrack include: The Del Fuegos, The dB's, The Dream Syndicate, Violent Femmes, The Waitresses, The Smithereens, Los Lobos, Alex Chilton and the Ben Vaughn Group. The original soundtrack record is out of print.

== Reception ==
Writing in the Zombie Movie Encyclopedia, academic Peter Dendle called it an "irreverent amateur parody of high school romance films in the Sixteen Candles tradition." Dendle cited the film as one of the forebears of the zombie romantic comedy trend of the 1980s and 1990s.
