= Up-Front (EP) =

EP by The Fleshtones
- Released: 1980
- Genre: Punk, garage rock
- Label: IRS Records
- Producer: Paul Wexler

The Fleshtones chronology
Up-Front (1980)	Roman Gods (1982)

Up-Front is a 12-inch, 45 rpm EP by the Fleshtones released in 1980. It was the band's first EP and predates their first album, Roman Gods. The EP featured the "Action Combo," brothers Gordon and Brian Spaeth on saxophones. The record sleeve was designed by lead singer Peter Zaremba.

== Track listing ==
All songs by Peter Zaremba, except as indicated.

=== Side one ===
1. "The Girl from Baltimore"
2. "Cold, Cold Shoes" (Zaremba, Keith Streng)
3. "Feel the Heat" (Zaremba, Streng)

=== Side two ===
1. "Play with Fire" (Mick Jagger, Keith Richards, Brian Jones, Bill Wyman, Charlie Watts)
2. "The Theme from 'The Vindicators'"

== Personnel ==
- Keith Streng — guitar & vocals
- Peter Zaremba — lead vocals, harmonica & organ
- Bill Milhizer — drums & vocals
- Jan Marek Pakulski — bass, vocals
- Gordon Spaeth — alto saxophone
- Brian Spaeth — tenor saxophone
