= Beautiful Light =

Studio album by the Fleshtones
- Released: 1994
- Genre: Garage rock
- Label: Naked Language
- Producer: Peter Buck

The Fleshtones chronology
Powerstance! (1991)	Beautiful Light (1994)	Laboratory of Sound (1995)

Beautiful Light is an album by the American band the Fleshtones, released in 1994. It was regarded as a comeback album.

Beautiful Light was issued in France as Forever Fleshtones, with a different track listing.

== Production ==
Recorded in Athens, Georgia, the album was produced by Peter Buck. Buck had wanted to produce the band since 1986. He played guitar on the album; Mike Mills played organ. "Whistling Past the Grave" was cowritten by Michael Stipe.

== Critical reception ==
Professional ratings
Review scores
Source	Rating
AllMusic	2/5 stars
The Encyclopedia of Popular Music	3/5 stars
Entertainment Weekly	B+
MusicHound Rock: The Essential Album Guide	4/5 stars
Orlando Sentinel	3/5 stars
The Tampa Tribune	2.5/4 stars

Entertainment Weekly wrote that the band, "with the help of lean, rootsy production by R.E.M.'s Peter Buck, crafted their most earnest release." Trouser Press noted that "'Mushroom Cloud' reconnects the band to the organ-powered psychedelia that has served it well in the past." The Vancouver Sun panned Buck's "thin and even" production work.

Stereo Review determined that "the Fleshtones rise to the occasion with a hunka-hunka burning blues/psych originals and enough garage-bred mustiness to keep things honest." Rolling Stone concluded that, "when the Fleshtones resist the archness that sometimes infects their artful trash, they deliver grins." The Tampa Tribune lamented the "somber mood" of Beautiful Light.

AllMusic called the album "a solid record," writing that "Pickin' Pickin'" "features a fast, scale-climbing bass guitar rounded out by a slick horn section and barroom piano." MusicHound Rock: The Essential Album Guide deemed it "a pure pop record."

== Track listing ==
No.	Title	Length
1.	"Mushroom Cloud"
2.	"Take a Walk with the Fleshtones"
3.	"Beautiful Light"
4.	"Big Heart"
5.	"Not Everybody's Jesus"
6.	"Whistling Past the Grave"
7.	"Outcast"
8.	"D.T. Shadows"
9.	"Pickin' Pickin'"
10.	"Pocketful of Change"
11.	"Push on Thru'"
12.	"Worried Boy Blues"
