= Roto Records =

- Founded: 1956
- Defunct: 1980s
- Status: Defunct
- Country of origin: U.S.
- Location: Lincoln, Nebraska

Roto Records was a record label based in Lincoln, Nebraska. The name "Roto" was chosen simply because "it [a record] goes round and round."

The label's first releases were in 1956 by local artists Bobby Lowell and The Rock-a-Boogie Boys. The label continued releasing recordings by Lowell and other local artists through the mid-1980s.

== Notable artists ==
Artist	Album	Format	Year
Norman Sullivan	She Called Me Baby / Folsom Prison	7", Single	1966
University of Nebraska Band	Go Big Red	7", Single	Unknown
Bobby Lowell	Umm Baby Baby	7", Single	1955
Bobby Lowell	Sixteen Chicks	7", Single	1955
