= Now hear this (nautical command) =

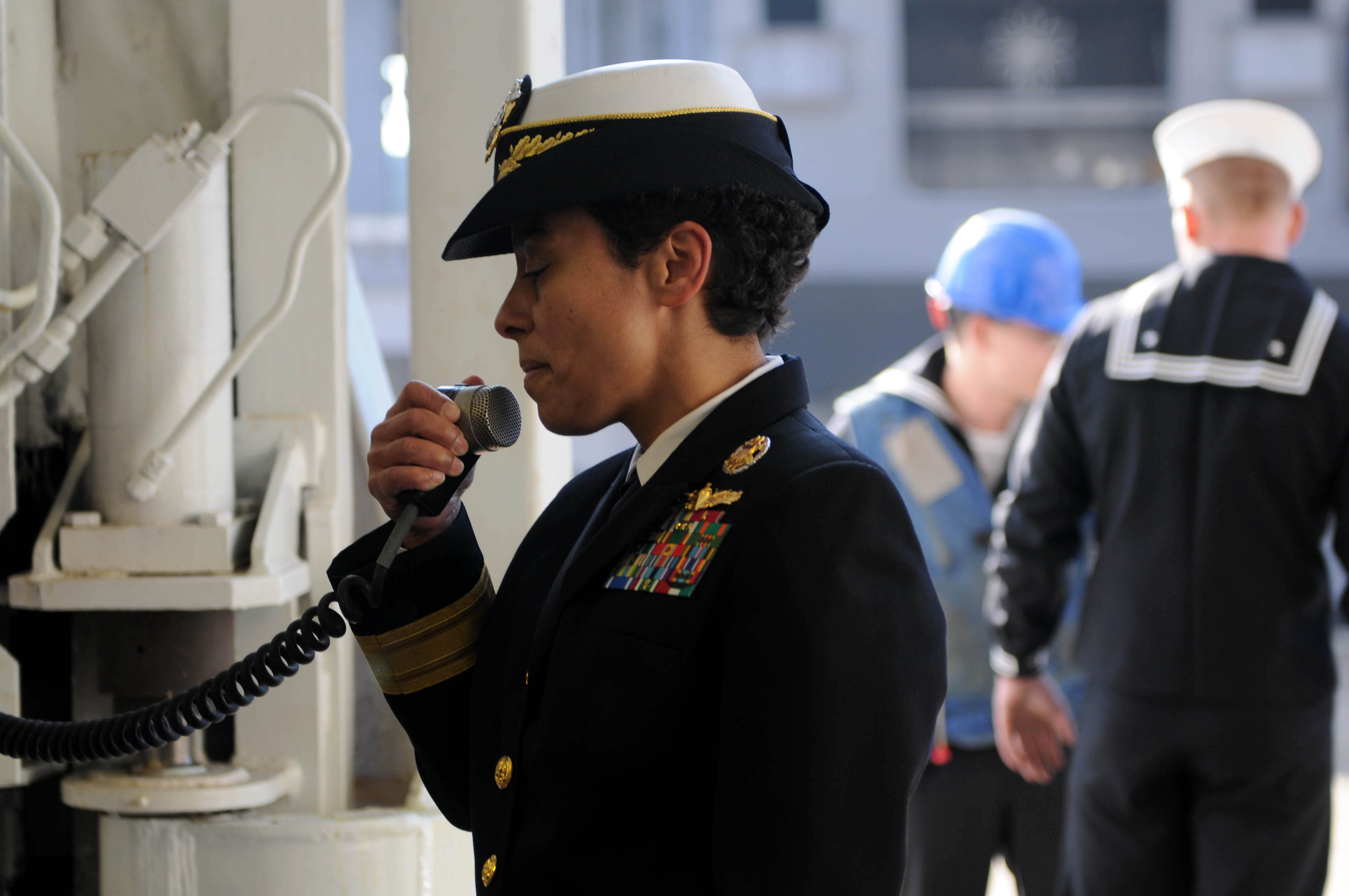
Admiral Michelle Howard using 1 Main Circuit to address the crew of USS Wasp (December 2009)

"Now hear this" is a phrase used in the United States Navy, to instruct personnel to give "attention to an order or command about to follow".
