= Fleshtones vs. Reality =

Studio album by The Fleshtones
- Released: March 13, 1987
- Venue: fall 1986
- Studio: Record Plant NYC and Axis Sound Studio, Atlanta, Georgia
- Genre: Punk, Garage rock
- Label: Emergo Records
- Producer: James A. Ball

The Fleshtones chronology
| Hexbreaker! (1983) | Fleshtones vs. Reality (1987) |

Professional ratings
Review scores
| Source | Rating |
|---|---|
| AllMusic | 3/5 stars |
| The Rolling Stone Album Guide | 2.5/5 stars |

Fleshtones vs. Reality is an album by The Fleshtones, released on Emergo Records in 1987. The album was recorded at the Record Plant in New York City in the fall of 1986 with the exception of two songs, "Return of the Leather Kings" and "Too Late To Run", which were recorded in May 1986 at Axis Sound Studio in Atlanta, Georgia. All songs were composed by band members with the exception of "Treat Her Like a Lady", a cover of the 1971 hit by the Cornelius Brothers and Sister Rose.

The back cover artwork (created and designed by Zaremba ) displays a large image of a person's right hand with about 20 mystical symbols (a triangle, a rectangle, the symbol for infinity, the Astrological symbols for Taurus, Virgo, the Sun, Moon, Jupiter, and Venus, and more) drawn on the palm of the hand in ink. Also highlighted in ink are the "life line" and "heart line"(from palm reading). Photos of the five band members appear where the five fingers should be, surrounded by handwriting identifying the band members and listing the instruments that they played on the album. The remaining liner notes are also hand written on the album cover at various orientations. A long humorous message to the reader occupying most of the left side of the album reads as follows:

Somebody had to do it! . . . and after waiting four years and studying the prophetic content of 'I'm gonna build me a Cave!' by John Lee Hooker, the FLESHTONES decided to do it themselves! The FLESHTONES are the FIVE ELEMENTS - combining to provide their 'special brand' of alchemy. . . passing the Philosopher's Stone over the discarded - transforming the discredited - rescuing and revivifying the bones rummaged from the musical glue factory. They reverse the rotting effects of reality, creating a world where a playboy (Horst Bucholst)(sic) helps an FBI agent find a kidnapped scientist (That Man in Istanbul). Our kind of world!!! But ask the mealy-mouthed, doesn't the FLESHTONES collective pitching arm ever tire of lobbing 'curve-balls' at boredom and pomposity? Can't anybody stop them? WHO WOULD WANT TO!!! Although internationally known as 'Nice Guys', the FLESHTONES henceforth operate on a SUPER-REVENGE MOTIF, ensuring 'Great Music' - and lots of laughs as their plans invariably explode in their faces. Do not attempt to recreate these stunts at home, merely purchase this LP and let these trained professionals get your kicks for you. GO AHEAD. IT'S ALRIGHT. This is NOT just a brittle snag to break the head-long plunge into the chasm of obscurity. NO - this is a 'rare opportunity' as well a 'standing invitation' from the FLESHTONES to step outside of time and claim the birthright they hold in trust for YOU! The FLESHTONES vs. Reality. . . YOU BE THE JUDGE!!!

== Critical reception ==
The Washington Post wrote that "for those who prefer to lose, rather than sooth, their minds, Fleshtones vs. Reality amplifies the noisiest sounds of the '60s in a perfectly mindless way." Rolling Stone wrote: "The Fleshtones are nearly legendary on the basis of their survival alone, and their latest album, Fleshtones vs. Reality (on Emergo), is a testament to their tenacity."

== Track listing ==
All songs by Peter Zaremba and Keith Streng, except as indicated.

=== "The First Side" ===
1. "Another Direction" (Zaremba)
2. "Way Up Here"
3. "Way Down South" (Zaremba)
4. "Treat Her Like a Lady" (Eddie Cornelius)
5. "Too Late To Run"
6. "The Return of the Leather Kings"

=== "The Other Side" ===
1. "Our Own Time" (Streng, Wild, Zaremba)
2. "What Ever Makes You Happy" (Zaremba)
3. "Mirror Mirror"
4. "The End of the Track" (Spaeth, Streng, Zaremba)
5. "Nothing's Gonna Bring Me Down"

== Personnel ==
The Fleshtones

- Peter Zaremba — vocals, harmonica, piano, organ, marimba, and FLEX unbreakable pocket comb
- Keith Streng — guitar, backing vocals, percussion, and bells
- Bill Milhizer — drums, percussion, backing vocals, marimba
- Jan Marek Pakulski — bass, backing vocals, marimba
- Gordon Russell Spaeth — harmonica, alto sax, baritone saxophone, organ, soprano and tenor recorders, brain-storms
- Robert Warren— bass on "What Ever Makes You Happy" and "Way Down South"

Additional personnel

Horns

In New York (The "Urban Blight")

- Danny Lipman — trumpet
- Nelson Keene Carse — trombone
- Tony Orbach — tenor saxophone
- Paul Vercesi — alto saxophone

In Atlanta

- Philip Rains — tenor saxophone
- Kenny Gregory — trumpet

Squad Car - Ed, Dan, and Joe, 'Mid-Town North' (Hell's Kitchen)

Super-Gang vocals

The King Family of the Lower East Side, Kenny Endicott, Sarah Fader, Keith Filbert, 'Baby' Gregor Jose Hayot, Sharon Hyland, Jody Kurilla, Andrew Lavar, Tom Pakulski, Pomme Nicole, Sabrina, Bob Singerman, Peggy Stephaich, Phillip Stahl, Michael Ullmann, Anita Verdun, Wendy Wild, and Peggy H. Wolf.

Backing vocals on "What Ever Makes You Happy"

The L.D.'s - Barrence Whitfield, Wendy Wild, Michael Ullmann and Keith Streng

Special "Phone-a-Rama" guest - "Mustang" Mike Cerezo

- James A. Ball - producer
- Teddy Treuhella - additional engineering
- George Pappas - additional engineering (in New York), co-producer of "Return of the Leather Kings" and "Too Late To Run" (in Atlanta)
- Paul Special - assistant engineer (in New York)
- Joe Hennehan - assistant engineer (in New York)
- Dan Vajanek - assistant engineer (in Atlanta)
- Mixed at the Record Plant by J.A.B. with various combinations of the Fleshtones and George Pappas
- Mastered by Greg Calbi
- Special assistance in Studio "D" (Smith's Bar and Grill) - Joe and Mike
- Cover photo - Lawrence Ivy
- Art and design, etc. - P.Z.
- Carrie Hamilton - graphics consultant
