= Now Hear This (The Split Squad album) =

Now Hear This...

Studio album by The Split Squad
- Released: January 21, 2014
- Recorded: 2012–2013
- Studio: Woolly Mammoth Sound Recording Studios (Boston); The Dungeon of Horror & The Type Foundry (Portland); Red Chuck (Mechanicsburg); Andy's House of Hits (Brooklyn); Strictly Vintage (Seattle)
- Genre: Rock, blues rock, power pop, pop, underground music
- Length: 41:56
- Label: Red Chuck Records, Closer Records
- Producer: Scott McCaughey

Now Hear This... is the debut album by American rock band The Split Squad. Featuring the lineup of Clem Burke, Michael Giblin, Josh Kantor, Eddie Munoz, and Keith Streng, it was released on January 21, 2014 on Red Chuck Records and features contributions from Scott McCaughey and Peter Buck of R.E.M. and The Baseball Project, Hugo Burnham of Gang of Four and Mike Gent of The Figgs.

== Background ==
According to bandleader and bassist Giblin, the band's "...sound might be best described as a trip through our record collections. A little punk, a little soul, a little glam, a lot of attitude!" About half of the songs were written by Giblin. According to him, some of the songs had been in his notebook at one stage or another, ""e.g."", the title song began to take form about 4 years before it was finished for the album. Not all songs took so long, "I Can't Remember" was created "...in about 40 minutes in a hotel room in India". The first collaboratively-written song was "Touch & Go". On that song, guitarist Streng wrote almost all the music, and Giblin wrote the lyrics and melody. Giblin and McCaughey collaborated on "Superman Says", with Giblin having the verses and the melody, but no chorus. He emailed the song to McCaughey, and about 20 minutes later received an email with an mp3 containing the lyrics. The album set of 10 original songs is rounded out with four covers. Steng takes over on vocals for a cover of 1960s and 1970s British musician Terry Reid "Tinker Taylor" - misspelled "Tinker Tailor" on the CD and back cover. The band covers "Put It Down", by Pennsylvania power pop/garage rock band The Jellybricks. The third cover is of The Small Faces "Sorry She's Mine". In the album acknowledgements, they list The Small Faces, adding "[especially The Small Faces]". The final cover is "You'll Never Change" first performed by Bettye LaVette, and covered by others.

== Recording ==
In an interview with Giblin, the band had been performing many of the songs on the album for nearly a year, but it took 4 months to coordinate everyone's schedules to book, in May 2013, a week of "summer camp", as producer Don Dixon calls it, in David Minehan's Woolly Mammoth Studios in Boston. A photogallery of that week is available on the group's web site. During that week, about 85% of 14 tracks were recorded. All the basic instrument tracks as well as all lead vocals were recorded then. During that week's recording session, drummer Hugo Burnham, who lives in the Boston area, was invited by the band to sit in and perform with them. He played congas on "Messin' Around" while during "I've Got A Feeling"'s breakdown, he overdubbed, on a separate drum kit, a second drum part. The individual kits were flanged and panned far left and right, with Burke on the left. Later, Streng's vocal and some lead guitar overdubs in "Tinker Tailor" were done in Andy Shernoff's studio in Brooklyn. At Woolly Mammoth Studios, the signal path was analog, through a Neotech Elite console, until digitized with a Pro Tools HD-2 digital audio workstation. Giblin subsequently went to Portland to Scott McCaughey's Dungeon of Horror studios to do most of what remained.

== Reception ==
Reviews of the album have been uniformly positive. Blurt reviewed the album, giving it 5 out of 5 stars. Writing for Carolina Orange, Richard Rossi wrote that with this collaboration"...there is more collective genius in the making of this disc than any that’s come along in a very long time." After receiving the album from Closer Records, Joe Whyte opened his review with "Powerpop/garage nobility with quite possibly the who-the-hell-are- they-and why didn’t I know-about-them album re-release of the year!" giving the album a 9 of 10 rating.

== Track listing ==
No.	Title	Length
1.	"Now Hear This"	3:44
2.	"Touch & Go"	3:17
3.	"She Is Everything"	3:16
4.	"Sorry She's Mine"	2:43
5.	"I've Got a Feeling"	3:28
6.	"I Can't Remember"	3:30
7.	"Feel the Same About You"	3:04
8.	"Superman Says"	2:25
9.	"Put It Down"	2:19
10.	"Tinker Tailor"	3:16
11.	"Hey Hey Baby"	2:02
12.	"You'll Never Change"	4:15
13.	"Messin' Around"	4:31
Total length:		41:56

== Personnel ==
=== Band members ===
- Clem Burke - drums, congas, percussion
- Michael Giblin - Vocals, electric bass and 6 and 12-string guitars piano, recording and mixing engineer
- Josh Kantor - keyboards
- Eddie Munoz - Electric 6 and 12-string guitars
- Keith Streng - Vocals, electric 6 and 12-string guitars, 6 string acoustic guitar,

=== Additional musicians ===
- Peter Buck - 12 string guitar on "Superman Says"
- Hugo Burnham - backing vocals, aka "Yob Vox" on Track 1, 2nd drums on Track 5, congas on Track 13
- Mike Gent - "Yob Vox" on Track 1, electric 12 string guitar on Track 8
- Scott McCaughey - vocals, electric 6 string guitar, keyboards, harmonica, percussion

=== Additional personnel ===
- Kurt Bloch - recording engineer
- Rick West - drum technician
- David James Minehan - recording and mix engineer
- Adam Seltzer - recording engineer
- Andy Shernoff - recording engineer
- Scott McCaughey - producer
- Roger Seibel - mastering engineer, SAE Digital & Analog Mastering, Phoenix, Arizona
