= Jim's Big Ego =

American band

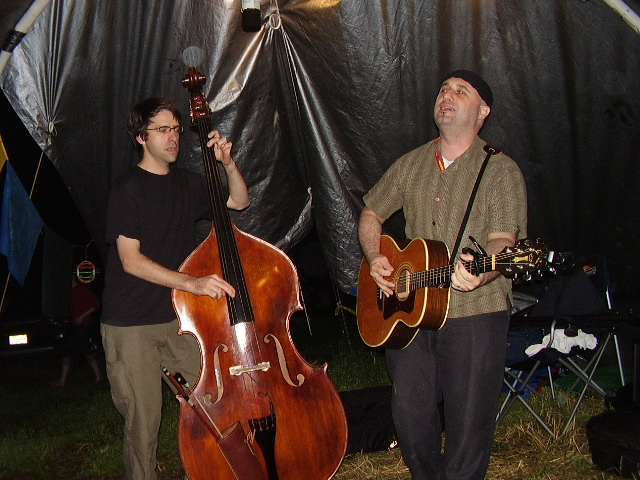
Flack and Infantino at the Budgiedome at the 2006 Falcon Ridge Folk Festival

Jim's Big Ego is a Boston, Massachusetts-based band formed in 1995 under the leadership of singer/songwriter Jim Infantino, who was named as the best new artist of 1995 by the National Academy of Songwriters.

Among the band's songs are "The Ballad of Barry Allen," about the DC superhero Barry Allen/The Flash, a character co-created by Infantino's uncle Carmine Infantino; "Asshole", a song about the George W. Bush administration that went viral, and "New Lang Syne" (sometimes also called "Thank God It's Over"), a new New Year's Eve song featured on National Public Radio's All Things Considered in 2001.

== Discography (as Jim Infantino) ==
- Strawman (1993)
- The World of Particulars (1995)
- Utopia Revisited (2023)

== Members ==
- Jim Infantino – guitar, lead vocals
- Jesse Flack – double bass, vocals
- Dan Cantor – drums, vocals
- Josh Kantor – Keyboards, vocals

== Discography ==
- 1996 – Titanic
- 1996 – More Songs About Me
- 1998 – Don't Get Smart
- 1999 – Y2K – Hooray! (EP)
- 2000 – Noplace Like Nowhere
- 2003 – They're Everywhere!
- 2005 – Support the Truth (EP E-Album)
- 2008 – free*
- 2012 – Stay
