= Josh Kantor =

US Musician and organist for the Boston Red Sox at Fenway Park

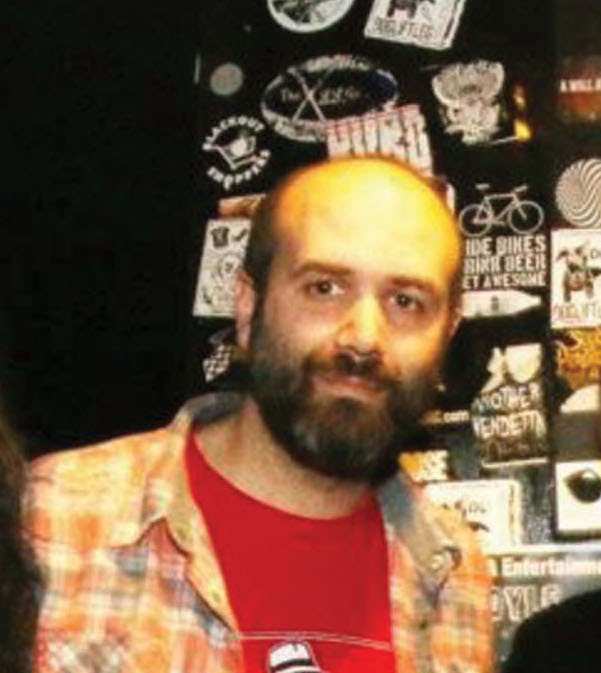
Josh Kantor

Joshua Kantor (born November 3, 1972) is the organist for Boston Red Sox home games at Fenway Park and plays keyboards and organ for the bands Jim's Big Ego, the Split Squad, and the Baseball Project.

== Early life ==
Kantor grew up in Athens, Georgia, where he began taking piano lessons at age "four or five," and developed an early interest in baseball through following the Atlanta Braves. He moved to the Chicago area when he was thirteen, and soon discovered Nancy Faust, the renowned organist for the Chicago White Sox. Kantor has repeatedly cited Faust as a major influence in his musical development as an organist.

Kantor continued to play music through high school and college. As a teen he was also mentored by Cantor Jeff Klepper at Evanston's Beth Emet The Free Synagogue. He attended Brandeis University, where he honed his improvisation skills playing piano with a campus sketch comedy group. After college, he remained in the Boston area and began to focus seriously on playing the organ, performing with local bands and comedy groups while supporting himself by working in libraries at Boston University and Harvard University.

== Boston Red Sox ==
When the Red Sox were looking for a new organist in 2003, Kantor was able to get an audition through the help of a friend who was working for the team. After two auditions in which he was asked to play a variety of popular songs and asked to improvise based on specific situations within a baseball game, he was hired. As of 2015, Kantor had not missed a single home game in twelve years.

During Red Sox home games at Fenway Park, Kantor plays organ music before and after games, mixing traditional favorites with current popular songs. During the ballgame, organ and recorded music alternate. Kantor works closely with TJ Connelly, the DJ for the Red Sox. Kantor takes requests from fans via his Twitter account (@jtkantor) and often plays songs suggested during the game by fans at the ballpark. Sometimes he learns those songs in advance so he can play them for the requestee, a process Steve Albini called "incredibly charming." Kantor has said that he got his idea in part from Yo La Tengo's live request fundraising shows on WFMU.

== Bands and other performances ==
In addition to his work with the Red Sox, Kantor plays regularly with Jim's Big Ego, a Boston-based rock band; The Split Squad, a so-called "super group" featuring former members of Blondie and The Fleshtones; and The Baseball Project, which writes and plays songs about baseball.

Kantor's high-profile job with the Red Sox has led to other notable performances including a program of ballpark music at Boston's Symphony Hall after the Red Sox's 2004 World Series championship; appearances on ESPN's SportsCenter, where he has played background music on the opening day of the baseball season for several years; and at the Todos Santos Music Festival, a multi-day arts and music festival founded by R.E.M. guitarist Peter Buck, at which Kantor plays keyboards and accordion in support of a variety of bands. He was the organist for the Dropkick Murphys "Streaming Outta Fenway" show on May 30, 2020.

== 7th-Inning Stretch ==
On March 26, 2020, with the baseball season cancelled, Kantor began livestreaming a daily show called the 7th-Inning Stretch on Facebook Live. He plays requested songs, shares baseball trivia, and participates in Q&A with viewers. The show, which is produced by his wife the Rev. Mary Jane Eaton (and Chloe Jr. a very small hippo), always includes the 7th Inning Stretch, a sing-a-long version of "Take Me Out to the Ballgame" with one changed lyric: "I DO care if I never get back." Kantor and Eaton encourage their viewers, who come from all around the world, to make donations to their local food banks in addition to being good to each other and washing their hands. The show has had a number of "secret surprise special guests" including Peter Gammons, Bob Kendrick, Joe Castiglione, Mike Mills, Kelly Hogan, Tanya Donelly, Ted Allen, Gary Louris and John Jackson, Ira Kaplan, Haben Girma, Dale Murphy, Ben Gibbard, Dave Davis, Steve Gorman, Kathy Valentine, Nate Query and Jenny Conlee, Shirley Burkovich, Maybelle Blair, and Nancy Faust. When baseball returned, Kantor and Eaton moved the show to a weekly one on Monday afternoons.
