= Richard Mazda =

British record producer, writer, and musician

Richard Mazda (born 5 May 1955) is a record producer, writer, musician, actor and director.

== Music career ==
Mazda was one of the co-founders of Poole punk/mod band Tours, singing and playing lead guitar.

They signed to Virgin Records in 1979 after releasing their self-produced and distributed "Language School/Foreign Girls" double A side 7" single. BBC Radio 1 DJs John Peel and Mike Read championed the band which led to a bidding war between Virgin, Polydor, Sire and EMI records. Eventually the band signed to Virgin, but the association was short-lived after an argument between the band and the label led the other founder/leader Ronnie Mayor to quit.

Mazda formed a new band, The Cosmetics, and went on to become the in house producer of IRS Records, working with punk/new wave acts such as The Fall, The Birthday Party, Wall of Voodoo, The Fleshtones, Tom Robinson (including playing guitar in his band), Alternative TV, Yello, Suburban Lawns, Brian James, The Scientists and The Folk Devils. He released a solo album, Hands of Fate, in 1983.

Later, Mazda turned his attention back to his first musical love and began working with R&B musicians such as Average White Band, The JBs, Neneh Cherry, Bootsy Collins and Ultra Nate.

== Songwriting ==
Mazda also pursued a parallel career as a songwriter. After signing to Warner Chappell Music in 1989 he wrote "How Long," a Billboard R&B No 2 hit for American singer Ultra Naté.

== Acting career ==
In January 2005 he formed his own acting troupe, The Queens Players and, a year after emigrating to the US, he scored an Off Broadway role as English in Scott Brooks's Bag Fulla Money. Mazda has appeared in various Hollywood films, including Saving Private Ryan, Batman Begins, Love Actually and Quills.

== Director ==
After several years in New York, Mazda built a custom theater complex, The Secret Theatre, which now is primarily an acting school that includes a thriving program for children. From 2008 to 2015 it hosted The Queens Players, a classical acting troupe founded by Mazda. In 2007, after a search for a home for The Queens Players, The Secret Theatre was built in a warehouse building, The LIC Arts Center, in Long Island City, Queens. The initial performance space was known as The Little Secret after a second larger space, The Big Secret, was constructed in 2009. This was followed by a third space, POCO, which opened in 2010, and then The Studio, which was built in 2012. It closed as a theater in 2020.

The Secret Theatre acted as a rental house for prestigious off off companies such as Flux Theatre Ensemble and Gideon Productions, and now has student shows. Notable productions included the NYIT Award-winning HoneyComb Trilogy and Adam Szymkowicz's Hearts Like Fists.

LIC Arts Open

== LIC Arts Open ==
Mazda co-founded the LIC Arts Open with sculptor/mosaicist, Karen Dimit, in 2011. It is the largest Art Festival in Queens, held in Long Island City. As of 2026, Mazda remains on the board of directors.
