= Fountains of Wayne discography =

Discography of American rock band

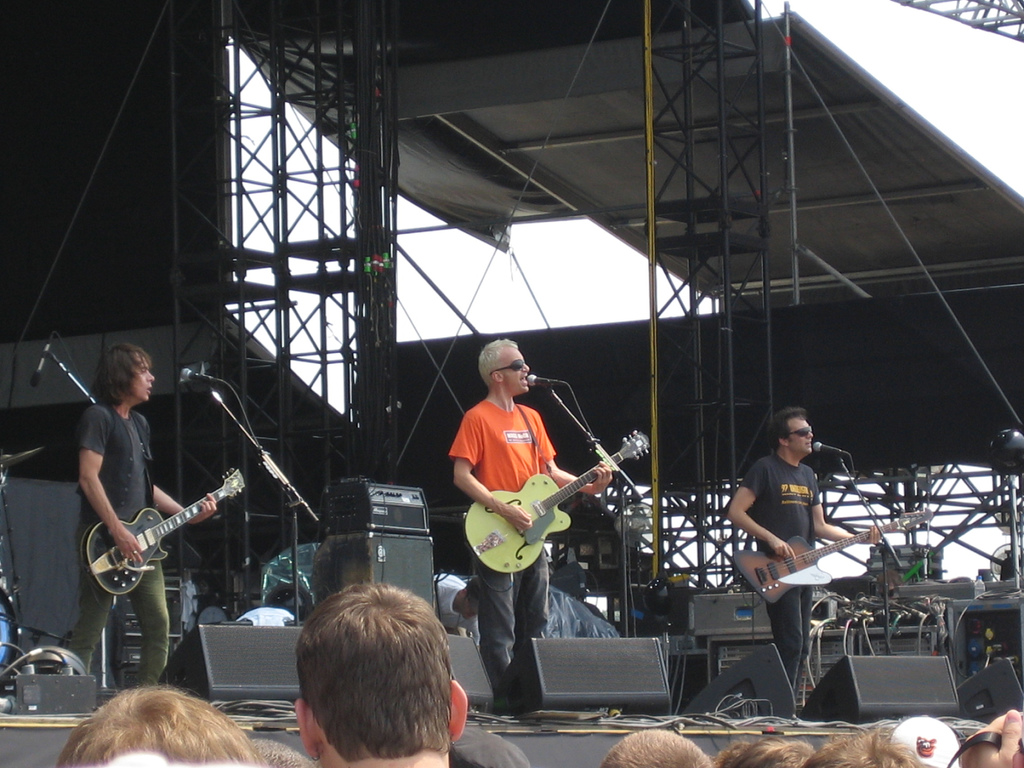
- Fountains of Wayne performing in 2007
- Studio albums: 5
- Compilation albums: 1
- Singles: 17
- Video albums: 1
- Music videos: 6
- Other appearances: 7

The discography of Fountains of Wayne contains five studio albums, one compilation album, 16 singles, one DVD, six music videos and seven other appearances.

Fountains of Wayne were formed in 1995 by bassist Adam Schlesinger and guitarist Chris Collingwood. They were joined by Jody Porter and Brian Young and recorded a demo.

The demo fell into the hands of Atlantic Records and in 1996, the band released their debut self-titled album. Two singles were released from it but it was the song "That Thing You Do", written by Schlesinger, that gained popularity through its use as the title song for the Tom Hanks' film of the same name. The track gained Schlesinger an Oscar nomination and the soundtrack gained RIAA gold certification.

The release of their second album, Utopia Parkway, in 1999 gained them mixed reviews and produced three singles. However, frustrations between the band and the label resulted in them being dropped by Atlantic Records. The band went into a hiatus, with all the members pursuing alternative musical paths. It wasn't until 2001 that the band resurfaced with a cover of The Kinks' "Better Things".

Welcome Interstate Managers, the third album, was released in 2003 on S-Curve Records. The single "Stacy's Mom" became an instant success earning a gold certification by the RIAA. The two follow-up singles, "Mexican Wine" and "Hey Julie" were not as popular; however, the track "All Kinds of Time" received commercial airtime through NFL promotions throughout the 2005 season. The success, particularly of "Stacy's Mom", led to the band being nominated for two Grammys; Best New Artist and Best Pop Performance by a Duo or Group with Vocals for "Stacy's Mom".

A compilation of B-sides was released in June 2005 entitled Out-of-State Plates. Two years later, in April 2007, a new album was released called Traffic and Weather. The track "I-95" from the album was named in Rolling Stone's Top 50 Songs of 2007.

The band's first DVD, No Better Place: Live in Chicago was released March 3, 2009. In 2011, the band released its final album, Sky Full of Holes, under Yep Roc Records.

== Albums ==
=== Studio albums ===
List of studio albums, with selected chart positions and sales figures
Title	Album details	Peak chart positions										Sales
Title	Album details	US	US Alt	US Indie	US Rock	AUS	JPN	NL	SCO	UK	UK Indie	Sales
Fountains of Wayne	Release date: October 1, 1996; Label: Atlantic; Formats: CD, LP	— (Note: Fountains of Wayne did not enter the US Billboard 200, but peaked at number 20 on the US Heatseekers Albums Chart.)	—	—	—	104	—	83	99	67	—	US: 153,000
Utopia Parkway	Release date: April 6, 1999; Label: Atlantic; Formats: CD, LP	— (Note: Utopia Parkway did not enter the US Billboard 200, but peaked at number 23 on the US Heatseekers Albums Chart.)	—	—	—	163	—	—	—	115	—	US: 90,000
Welcome Interstate Managers	Release date: June 10, 2003; Label: S-Curve/Virgin; Formats: CD, music download	115	—	—	—	198	—	— (Note: Welcome Interstate Managers did not enter the Dutch Album Top 100, but peaked at number 22 on the Dutch Alternative Albums chart.)	—	160	—	US: 448,000
Traffic and Weather	Release date: April 3, 2007; Label: S-Curve/Virgin; Formats: CD, music download	97	—	—	—	—	36	—	—	172	—	
Sky Full of Holes	Release date: August 2, 2011; Label: Yep Roc/Lojinx; Formats: CD, LP, music download	37	4	3	6	—	51	—	—	102	16	
"—" denotes releases that did not chart or was not released in that territory.

=== Compilation albums ===
Title	Details	Peak positions
Title	Details	US
Out-of-State Plates	Release date: June 28, 2005; Label: Virgin; Formats: CD, music download	168

== Singles ==
List of singles, with selected chart positions and sales figures, showing year released and album name
Title	Year	Peak chart positions										Certifications	Album
Title	Year	US	US Rock	AUS	CAN	IRL	JPN	NOR	NZ	SCO	UK	Certifications	Album
"Radiation Vibe"	1996	— (Note: "Radiation Vibe" did not enter the Billboard Hot 100, but peaked at number 71 on the Hot 100 Airplay chart.)	— (Note: "Radiation Vibe" did not enter the Hot Rock & Alternative Songs chart, but peaked at number 14 on the US Alternative Airplay chart.)	95	—	—	—	—	—	29	32		Fountains of Wayne
"Sink to the Bottom"	1997	—	—	153	—	—	—	7	—	36	42		Fountains of Wayne
"Leave the Biker"	1997	—	—	—	—	—	—	—	—	—	—		Fountains of Wayne
"Survival Car"	1997	—	—	—	—	—	—	—	—	58	53		Fountains of Wayne
"Barbara H."	1997	—	—	—	—	—	—	—	—	—	94		Fountains of Wayne
"I Want an Alien for Christmas"	1997	—	—	—	—	—	—	—	—	34	36		Non-album single
"Denise"	1999	—	— (Note: "Denise" did not enter the Hot Rock & Alternative Songs chart, but peaked at number 34 on the US Alternative Airplay chart.)	—	—	—	—	—	—	58	57		Utopia Parkway
"Red Dragon Tattoo"	1999	—	—	61	—	—	—	—	—	83	79		Utopia Parkway
"Troubled Times"	1999	—	—	—	—	—	—	—	—	—	134		Utopia Parkway
"Stacy's Mom"	2003	21	12	14	13	9	—	—	35	6	11	RIAA: Gold; ARIA: Gold; BPI: 2× Platinum; RMNZ: Platinum	Welcome Interstate Managers
"Mexican Wine"	2004	—	—	—	—	—	—	—	—	—	—		Welcome Interstate Managers
"Hey Julie"	2004	—	—	—	—	—	—	—	—	58	57		Welcome Interstate Managers
"Maureen"	2005	—	—	—	—	—	—	—	—	—	—		Out-of-State Plates
"Someone to Love"	2007	—	— (Note: "Someone to Love" did not enter the Hot Rock & Alternative Songs chart, but peaked at number 19 on the US Adult Alternative Airplay chart.)	—	—	—	—	—	—	—	— (Note: "Someone to Love" did not enter the UK Singles Chart, but peaked at number 22 on the UK Airplay chart.)		Traffic and Weather
"Song Of The Passaic"	2010	—	—	—	—	—	—	—	—	—	—		Non-album single
"Richie and Ruben"	2011	—	—	—	—	—	—	—	—	—	— (Note: "Richie and Ruben" did not enter the UK Singles Chart, but peaked at number 33 on the UK Physical Singles Chart Top 100.)		Sky Full of Holes
"Someone's Gonna Break Your Heart"	2011	—	—	—	—	—	—	—	—	—	— (Note: "Someone's Gonna Break Your Heart" did not enter the UK Singles Chart, but peaked at number 45 on the UK Physical Singles Chart Top 100.)		Sky Full of Holes
"The Summer Place"	2011	—	—	—	—	—	79	—	—	—	—		Sky Full of Holes
"—" denotes releases that did not chart or was not released in that territory.

== Video albums ==
Year	Video details
2009	No Better Place: Live in Chicago: Released: March 3, 2009; Label: Shout Factory; Formats: DVD

== Music videos ==
Year	Title	Director
1996	"Radiation Vibe"	Clark Eddy
1997	"Sink to the Bottom"	Chris Applebaum
1999	"Denise"	Tryan George
1999	"Troubled Times"	
2003	"Stacy's Mom"	Chris Applebaum
2004	"Mexican Wine"	Chris Applebaum
2007	"Someone to Love"	Adam Neustadter
2011	"The Summer Place"	David Dutton

== Other appearances ==
Year	Release details	Track(s)
2000	Scary Movie: Music That Inspired the Soundtrack: Released: July 4, 2000; Label: TVT Records; Format: CD, music download	"Too Cool for School"
2002	This Is Where I Belong – The Songs of Ray Davies & The Kinks: Released: April 2, 2002; Label: Rhino Entertainment; Format: CD, music download	"Better Things"
2003	Now That's What I Call Music! 14 (American series): Released: November 4, 2003; Label: Sony; Format: CD	"Stacy's Mom"
2004	2004 Grammy Nominees: Released: January 20, 2004; Label: BMG; Format: CD	"Stacy's Mom"
2004	Future Soundtrack for America: Released: August 17, 2004; Label: Barsuk Records; Format: CD	"Everything's Ruined (acoustic)"
2005	Robots: The Original Motion Picture Soundtrack: Released: March 1, 2005; Label: Virgin Records; Format: CD, music download	"Tell Me What You Already Did"
2008	Live from the Artists Den: Season One: Released: February 5, 2008; Label: Artists Den Records; Format: CD, music download	"Traffic & Weather (live)"
2013	Sandra Boynton's Frog Trouble: Released: September 3, 2013; Label: WMN/Boynton Recordings; Format: CD, music download	"Trucks"
