= Saving for a Custom Van =

Compilation album by Various artists
- Released: June 16, 2020
- Genre: Alternative rock, indie rock
- Label: Father/Daughter Records

Saving for a Custom Van is a 2020 tribute album to Adam Schlesinger, who died earlier that year to COVID-19. Schlesinger wrote or co-wrote all of the songs. The title is a lyric from the first track, "Utopia Parkway." It was released on June 16, 2020 on Bandcamp and as a colored vinyl LP in 2022.

Similar to the songwriting agreement of Lennon-McCartney (wherein both authors often wrote songs individually but were credited collectively no matter who actually wrote the track) songs credited to the team of Chris Collingwood and Adam Schlesinger are usually written by only one of the two. Several of the Collingwood/Schlesinger songs on this compilation (including "A Fine Day For A Parade" and "Valley Winter Song") were actually wholly written by Collingwood.

== Track listing ==
No.	Title	Writer(s)	Cover artist(s)	Length
1.	"Utopia Parkway"	Chris Collingwood and Adam Schlesinger	Apex Manor	3:22
2.	"Undertow"	Andy Chase, Dominique Durand, Schlesinger	Tanya Donelly and Gail Greenwood	4:37
3.	"Please Don't Rock Me Tonight"	Collingwood and Schlesinger	Jeff Rosenstock	2:34
4.	"Radiation Vibe"	Collingwood and Schlesinger	Kay Hanley	3:31
5.	"Way Back Into Love"	Schlesinger	Ben Lee and Sarah Silverman	4:23
6.	"Just the Girl"	Schlesinger	Remember Sports	3:37
7.	"Stacy's Mom"	Collingwood and Schlesinger	Rachel Bloom	4:07
8.	"Red Dragon Tattoo"	Collingwood and Schlesinger	Christian Lee Hutson	3:55
9.	"A Fine Day For a Parade"	Collingwood and Schlesinger	Sad13	4:13
10.	"What'll It Be"	Dolgen and Schlesinger	Jack Dolgen	2:46
11.	"A Dip in the Ocean"	Collingwood and Schlesinger	Motion City Soundtrack	3:16
12.	"Valley Winter Song"	Collingwood and Schlesinger	Field Mouse	3:38
13.	"That Thing You Do!"	Schlesinger	Cheekface	2:25
14.	"I've Got a Flair"	Collingwood and Schlesinger	Lucy Stone	2:28
15.	"Sick Day"	Collingwood and Schlesinger	Nada Surf	4:23
16.	"Four in the Morning"	Chase, Durand and Schlesinger	Jody Porter	4:51
17.	"All Kinds of Time"	Collingwood and Schlesinger	Suzy Shinn and Charlie Brand	3:53
18.	"Everyday"	Chase, Durand and Schlesinger	Ted Leo	4:43
19.	"I've Got a Feeling"	Chase, Durand and Schlesinger	Potty Mouth	2:58
20.	"Sink to the Bottom"	Collingwood and Schlesinger	Cocktails	2:52
21.	"Our Twisted Fate"	Rachel Bloom, Dolgen, Alden Derck and Schlesinger	Bree McKenna	2:29
22.	"Troubled Times"	Collingwood and Schlesinger	Ethan Eubanks	3:40
23.	"Hackensack"	Collingwood and Schlesinger	Ali Koehler	2:54
24.	"Pretend to Be Nice"	Schlesinger	Charly Bliss	3:51
25.	"Michael and Heather at the Baggage Claim"	Schlesinger	Julian Velard and Alex Dezen	4:14
26.	"Tess Don't Tell"	Chase, Durand and Schlesinger	HUNNY	4:32
27.	"Hey Julie"	Collingwood and Schlesinger	Mikey Erg	2:32
28.	"Come On"	Kenneth Edmonds, Harry Elfont, Jason Falkner, David Gibbs, Dionne Gipson, Kay Hanley, Steve Hurley, Deborah Kaplan, Schlesigner, and Jane Wiedlin	Off Book and the Family Band	3:31
29.	"Mexican Wine"	Collingwood and Schlesinger	Prince Daddy & The Hyena and Just Friends	3:50
30.	"Little Red Light"	Collingwood and Schlesinger	Lisa Prank	3:00
31.	"Survival Car"	Collingwood and Schlesinger	Joshua Stoddard	0:55
