= Someone to Love (Fountains of Wayne song) =

Single by Fountains of Wayne

from the album Traffic and Weather
- Released: February 9, 2007
- Genre: Disco; rock
- Length: 3:52
- Label: Virgin
- Songwriters: Chris Collingwood; Adam Schlesinger
- Producer: Schlesinger

Fountains of Wayne singles chronology
"Maureen" (2005)	"Someone to Love" (2007)	"Song Of The Passaic" (2010)

Music video
- "Someone to Love" on YouTube

"Someone to Love" is a song by American rock band Fountains of Wayne. It was released on February 9, 2007, as the lead single from their fourth studio album, Traffic and Weather. Written by Chris Collingwood and Adam Schlesinger, the song peaked at number 19 on the US Adult Alternative Airplay chart.

A music video featuring an appearance from comedian Demetri Martin, was released on May 2, 2007. It was released in the United Kingdom on May 28, 2007.

== Background ==
In January 2007, Fountains of Wayne announced that their fourth studio album Traffic and Weather would be released on April 3, 2007, with opening track "Someone to Love", featuring guest vocals from Melissa Auf der Maur of The Smashing Pumpkins. The track was released for streaming via Virgin Records' website on February 9, serving as the lead single from the album.

== Composition ==
"Someone to Love" was written by Chris Collingwood and Adam Schlesinger, the latter also produced the song. According to the sheet music published at Musicnotes.com, by Alfred Music Publishing, the track runs at 120 BPM and is in the key of B Minor. Collingwood's range in the song spans from the notes A3 to A♯5. Lyrically, the song has a message of hope. Musically, it is described as disco rock.

== Critical reception ==
Dan Pashman of NPR Music complimented the song with a review title of "The Best Song In The World Today", writing, "The catchiness may draw you in, but it's the juxtaposition of a bubble gum aesthetic and acidic lyrics, delivered with deadpan pop glee, that makes the music stand out."

== Chart performance ==
"Someone to Love" debuted at number 28 on the US Adult Alternative Airplay chart, before peaking at number 19. It also debuted at number 28 on the UK Airplay chart, later reaching number 22.

== Music video ==
The music video for "Someone to Love" was released on May 2, 2007. Director Adam Neustadter spoke about the plot behind the video stating,

"When I first heard 'Someone To Love,' I immediately thought of The Beatles' 'Eleanor Rigby'. Not just because of Beth's last name — which may be a reference to Father Mackenzie — but because of the accurate descriptions of these lonely people and how the song answers The Beatles' questions of, 'All the the [sic] lonely people, where do they all come from? All the lonely people, where do they all belong?' Was I reading into this too much? Absolutely [...] The story is about these two lonely characters living in New York, leading parallel lives right next door to each other, but with no idea the other exists. When their paths finally do cross, they blow the chance at finding love and we see that, despite being so lonely, they're still cutthroat New Yorkers who are too busy to care."

The video stars Demetri Martin playing Seth Shapiro and Faryl Millet playing Beth Mackenzie. The video premiered via MTV on May 9, 2007.

== Track listing ==
Digital download
No.	Title	Length
1.	"Someone to Love"	3:52

UK CD single
No.	Title	Length
1.	"Someone to Love" (radio edit)	3:43

== Personnel ==
Credits for "Someone to Love" retrieved from album's liner notes.

Fountains of Wayne

- Chris Collingwood – lead vocals, rhythm guitar
- Jody Porter – lead guitar, backing vocals
- Adam Schlesinger – bass, synthesizers, backing vocals
- Brian Young – drums, percussion

Additional musicians

- Melissa Auf der Maur – backing vocals

Production

- Adam Schlesinger – producer
- Michael Brauer – mixing
- George Marino – mastering
- Geoff Sanoff – engineer
- John Holbrook – engineer
- Arjun Agerwala – assistant recording, assistant engineer
- Rudyard Lee Cullers – assistant recording, assistant engineer

== Charts ==
Chart performance for "Someone to Love"
Chart (2007)	Peak position
UK Airplay (Music Week)	22
US Adult Alternative Airplay (Billboard)	19

== Release history ==
Release dates and formats for "Someone to Love"
Region	Date	Format	Label	Ref.
Various	February 9, 2007	Digital download; streaming	Virgin	
United States	February 19, 2007	Adult alternative radio	Virgin	
United Kingdom	May 28, 2007	CD	Virgin	
