= Mexican Wine (song) =

Single by Fountains of Wayne

from the album Welcome Interstate Managers
- Released: January 20, 2004
- Genre: Power pop; pop rock
- Length: 3:22
- Label: S-Curve; Virgin
- Songwriters: Chris Collingwood; Adam Schlesinger
- Producers: Collingwood; Schlesinger; Mike Denneen

Fountains of Wayne singles chronology
"Stacy's Mom" (2003)	"Mexican Wine" (2004)	"Hey Julie" (2004)

Music video
- "Mexican Wine" on YouTube

"Mexican Wine" is a song by American rock band Fountains of Wayne. It was released on January 20, 2004, as the second single from their third studio album, Welcome Interstate Managers. The song was released in Europe on May 17, 2004.

Though the song never charted, it was met with positive reviews from music critics, praising the track's sound and lyrics. It was written and produced by members Chris Collingwood and Adam Schlesinger.

== Background ==
After releasing "Stacy's Mom" as the lead single from Welcome Interstate Managers, the band planned on releasing "Mexican Wine" as the album's next single. It was released for radio airplay on January 20, 2004. It was released in Europe on May 17.

== Composition ==
"Mexican Wine" was written and produced by Chris Collingwood and Adam Schlesinger. The track was also produced by Mike Denneen. According to Schlesinger, he wanted to "imitate" the way Collingwood writes, stating, "Chris' have been more free associative. I was really jealous of his ability to write this semi-nonsense that still held together, so I tried to sit down and come up with a bunch of images that didn't make a whole lot of sense."

The song is described as power pop and pop rock. Lyrically, the song is about causalities, "built around a Beatles-y melody."

== Critical reception ==
Professional ratings
Review scores
Source	Rating
Drowned in Sound	8/10

"Mexican Wine" was met with positive reviews from music critics. Andrew Farley of Drowned in Sound rewarded the single an 8 out of 10 rating, praising the lyrics, describing it as "trademark Fountains Of Wayne." He also praised the track's sound stating, "It's odd that a bunch of thirty-something Americans can make such fantastic sounding '60s-influenced guitar pop, executed to near perfection and remain endearing to those who subscribe to their witty, self-aware lyrics and tunes." Ben Hogwood of MusicOHM wrote that the song "doesn't disappoint," praising the harmonies and melody on the track. Mark Martelli of Pitchfork called the song "the biggest rocker on the record" and remarked, "As soon as the seconds start ticking and the guitar starts strumming on 'Mexican Wine', you know what you're in for: fuzzy guitars, big Warner Bros. drums, and the gravelly voices of Schlesinger and Chris Collingwood." Writing for Entertainment Weekly, Beth Johnson compared the track to The Beatles' "Strawberry Fields Forever" due to its "horns and brass-ring fumbles." Alex Robert Ross of The Fader described the song as "perfect power pop song," praising its harmonies and melody.

Following the death of Schlesinger, The New York Times released their "Adam Schlesinger's 30 Essential Songs" list, where "Mexican Wine" was listed. Writing for the publication, Rob Tannenbaum wrote, "It's part John Cheever, part John Hughes. This slow-building rocker cycles around a great description of someone stuck in place." On Goldmine's "10 Great Fountains of Wayne Songs" list, author John M. Borack said of the song, "This startling pronouncement is quickly followed by a gently tinkling harpsichord, which is soon chased out by monster rock guitars riffing like mad. All this frivolity should be clue number one that this is not some garden variety power pop combo."

== Music video ==
The music video premiered in January 2004. Directed by Chris Applebaum, it was shot in Los Angeles in December 2003. The video opens with twin sisters Katie and Linda Lipschitz, returning champions of a talent show, being introduced by the pseudo show's host, played by Drew Carey. Asked what song they'll perform, the twins shout, "'Mexican Wine' by Fountains of Wayne!" and break into song. The scene shifts to the deck of a yacht during the second verse, where the band are performing for a crowd amid a line of dancers. The members also mingle with the crowd until a pillow fight breaks out. The set then changes to the band doing a spoof of Duran Duran's "Rio" video. The final scene returns to the talent show's soundstage.

== Track listing ==
US CD single
No.	Title	Length
1.	"Mexican Wine"	3:22

UK CD single
No.	Title	Length
1.	"Mexican Wine" (radio edit)	2:41

== Personnel ==
Credits for "Mexican Wine" retrieved from album's liner notes.

Fountains of Wayne

- Chris Collingwood – lead vocals, rhythm guitar
- Jody Porter – lead guitar, backing vocals
- Adam Schlesinger – bass, synthesizers, backing vocals
- Brian Young – drums, percussion

Additional musicians

- Ronnie James Buttacavoli – trumpet

Production

- Chris Collingwood – producer
- Adam Schlesinger – producer, additional engineer
- Mike Denneen – producer
- Tom Lord-Alge – mixing
- George Marino – mastering
- Matt Beaudoin – assistant engineer
- Rafi Sofer – assistant engineer
- Rudyard Lee Cullers – assistant engineer
- Richard Furch – additional engineer

== Release history ==
Release dates and formats for "Mexican Wine"
Region	Date	Format	Label	Ref.
United States	January 20, 2004	Contemporary hit radio	S-Curve; Virgin	
Europe	May 17, 2004	CD	S-Curve; Virgin	
