= Sky Full of Holes =

Studio album by Fountains of Wayne
- Released: July 20, 2011
- Genres: Alternative rock; power pop
- Length: 45:05
- Labels: Yep Roc (USA); Lojinx (Europe); Warner Music (Japan)
- Producers: Adam Schlesinger, Chris Collingwood

Fountains of Wayne chronology
Traffic and Weather (2007)	Sky Full of Holes (2011)

Singles from Sky Full Of Holes
- 1. "Someone's Gonna Break Your Heart" Released: July 18, 2011

Sky Full of Holes is the fifth and final studio album by the American rock band Fountains of Wayne. It was released on July 20, 2011, in Japan, on August 1, 2011, in Europe, and on August 2, 2011, in North America. It debuted at number 37 on the US Billboard 200, giving Fountains of Wayne their first Top 40 album on that chart, and debuted at number 16 on the UK independent chart.

== Background ==
Prior to working on their fifth album, Fountains of Wayne had done acoustic tours that would eventually influence the direction they took for the record. According to guitarist Jody Porter, "It’s a little bit more introspective and not as loud of a record as the last two. I think that came from the fact that we started last year doing acoustic-based tours because we didn’t have a record out. We wanted to get back out on tour and did it stripped-down. Overall it’s not as brash or guitar-heavy."

Having taken a back seat to bassist Adam Schlesinger during the writing and recording of previous album Traffic and Weather due to personal health issues, lead singer and co-songwriter Chris Collingwood became more involved this time around. Collingwood stated, "When we made the last record, I was not doing well in a lot of different ways, drunk a lot of the time. I didn’t contribute a whole lot to the last record, and I think we settled into a situation where Adam was taking control of a lot of things. I only wrote three songs on the previous Fountains of Wayne record, so when this one came along I had a lot more to bring. It was just a matter of bringing everything back into balance, and there was a lot of fighting about it."

During the making of the album, the relationship between Collingwood and Schlesinger had deteriorated to the point where they had to stop working and seek professional help. According to Collingwood in 2016, "Adam and I just fought constantly making that record. We stopped making that record in the middle of making that record to try to work out a whole bunch of things that were going on between us. We saw a psychiatrist and tried to work things out." In the end, they agreed to finish the album and tour behind it, before going their separate ways.

== Reception ==
Professional ratings
Aggregate scores
Source	Rating
Metacritic	68/100 link
Review scores
Source	Rating
AllMusic	link
Americana UK	link
Entertainment Weekly	A− link
The Guardian	link
The Irish Times	link
Melodic.net	link
Robert Christgau	A− link
Rolling Stone	link
Slant Magazine	link
Spin	7/10 stars

Jody Rosen, writing in Rolling Stone, had high praise for the album, and said the storytelling was "sharp" and the guitar hooks "crunchy," with the overall direction of the album darker than previous outings. Jill Menze of Billboard called the album "excellent", describing it as "a new minimal sound with a poppy, folk-leaning flair."

Spin gave the album a score of 7/10. Critic Stacey Anderson writes, "'Sky' eschews the occasional decade-hopscotching of 2007's Traffic and Weather, reaching a new, raw sincerity and cohesiveness: 'Hate to See You Like This' is an anxious entreaty to a depressed girlfriend exquisitely framed by a dramatic backdrop of electric and acoustic guitars."

Chris Willman of Reuters also strongly recommended the album, but cautioned listeners: "It may be a moot point that the new effort is FOW's least airplay-friendly, since neither radio nor MTV would likely play this kind of stuff anymore even if the group did manage to come up with a 'Stacy's Mom II.' But fans who prefer an abundance of power in their power-pop may worry about what the lopsided spunk-to-sadness ratio portends for the beloved band." He called "Action Hero" the best track on the album. Matt Diehl of the Los Angeles Times lauded the album. "Sky teems with immaculate power pop, spanning jangling Beatlesque rockers like “The Summer Place” through the bittersweet balladry of “I Hate to See You Like This”... It's a remarkably consistent album, full of snappy arrangements, surprising chord changes and tasteful instrumentation, but Collingwood's voice embodies its true appeal," he wrote. "That storytelling depth raises Fountains of Wayne to the apex of their genre, imparting a wry, cynical worldview that lingers well after the snap, crackle and fizz subsides."

Allison Stewart, reviewing the album for The Washington Post, was more mixed in her assessment. She said, "Sky, with its carefully detailed stories of suburban schlubs, feuding bar owners and luckless Acela riders, hits all the right notes, but something feels off. Slow and sentimental, more wistful than droll, Sky is as interested in loping, acoustic country-folk songs as it is in vigorous pop. If the band’s last album, 2007’s Traffic and Weather, was a Cars homage, Sky is an unofficial tribute to the Jayhawks. It’s not a misfire — one of its gentlest songs, “A Road Song,” is also one of the band's all-time finest — but those who expect the usual gimlet-eyed power pop (that is to say, most everyone) will be left wondering where it went."

In the United Kingdom, The Guardian critic Michael Hann described the album's music as "a more sedate sound, the dominant texture being acoustic guitar overlaid with muted electrics." But the sound was a good one for the band, he said, and named the final track, "Cemetery Guns," the album's best for being "beautifully arranged and written with calm understatement".

== Covers ==
America covered "A Road Song" on their 2011 Back Pages album.

== Track listing ==
All songs written by Chris Collingwood and Adam Schlesinger, except where noted.

No.	Title	Length
1.	"The Summer Place"	3:31
2.	"Richie and Ruben"	3:32
3.	"Acela"	3:13
4.	"Someone's Gonna Break Your Heart"	3:54
5.	"Action Hero"	4:00
6.	"A Dip in the Ocean"	3:35
7.	"Cold Comfort Flowers"	4:26
8.	"A Road Song"	3:04
9.	"Workingman's Hands"	2:39
10.	"Hate to See You Like This"	4:14
11.	"Radio Bar"	2:56
12.	"Firelight Waltz"	3:14
13.	"Cemetery Guns"	2:54

iTunes Store bonus track (US)
No.	Title	Length
14.	"Song of the Passaic" (John Alleyne Macnab, Fountains of Wayne)	2:51

Amazon MP3 bonus track (US)
No.	Title	Length
15.	"The Story in Your Eyes" (Justin Hayward)	3:04

== Personnel ==
Fountains of Wayne

- Chris Collingwood - lead vocals, rhythm guitar, keyboards, production
- Jody Porter - lead guitar, backing vocals
- Adam Schlesinger - bass, rhythm guitar, keyboards, backing vocals, production
- Brian Young - drums, percussion

Additional Musicians

- Ronnie Buttacavoli - trumpet on "Radio Bar"
- Garo Yellin - cello on "Cemetery Guns"

Technical Personnel

- Arjun Agerwala - engineer
- Violeta Alvarez - photography
- Rudyard Lee Cullers - engineer
- George Marino - mastering
- Atsuo Matsumoto - assistant engineer
- Mike Nesci - assistant engineer
- Geoff Sanoff - engineer
- Adam Tilzer - assistant engineer

== Charts ==
Chart performance for Sky Full of Holes
Chart (2011)	Peak position
Japan Top Album Sales (Billboard Japan)	51
UK Albums (OCC)	102
UK Independent Albums (OCC)	16
US Billboard 200	37
US Independent Albums (Billboard)	3
US Indie Store Album Sales (Billboard)	4
US Top Alternative Albums (Billboard)	4
US Top Rock Albums (Billboard)	6
