= Back Pages =

Studio album by America
- Released: July 26, 2011
- Recorded: British Grove Studios, London; Your Place or Mine, Glendale; Tracking Room, Nashville; Zoomar South Studios, Nashville
- Genre: Soft rock
- Length: 46:09
- Label: eOne
- Producer: Fred Mollin

America chronology
Hits: 40th Anniversary Edition (2011)	Back Pages (2011)	Lost & Found (2015)

Back Pages is the 17th studio album by America, released on July 26, 2011 by eOne. The album is the band's first studio album of cover versions of songs by some of their favorite songwriters. The album features guest appearances by Mark Knopfler and Van Dyke Parks.

== Recording ==
Back Pages was recorded at British Grove Studios in London, Your Place or Mine in Glendale, California, and the Tracking Room and Zoomar South Studios in Nashville.

== Release and promotion ==
Back Pages was released on July 26, 2011 by eOne. The release of Back Pages coincidentally fell two days after the sudden death of co-founding America band member Dan Peek.

== Musical style ==
The musical style of Back Pages consists of the classic America vocal and acoustic guitar sound, backed by top Nashville session players, and enhanced by producer Fred Mollin's inclusion of some period sounds, like the sitar-effected guitar on "Woodstock" and the "heavily overdone guitar effects" on "Time of the Season".

== Artwork ==
The album cover photo was taken by Chad Griffith and shows a brown leather-bound manuscript album containing sheet music, lying on a wooden table. The manuscript album cover contains the title words "Back" and "Pages" separated by the band's stylized logo.

== Touring ==
In 2011, America performed 85 concerts throughout the United States, Canada, Italy, France, Guatemala, Honduras, and Chile.

== Critical reception ==
Professional ratings
Review scores
Source	Rating
AllMusic	3/5 stars
American Songwriter	3.5/5 stars

In his review for AllMusic, Stephen Thomas Erlewine gave the album three out of five stars, noting the album's "intimate and friendly" production and the sometimes surprising arrangements, concluding, "It's comfortable and engaging without being complacent; it's a visit with old friends that still can do something unexpected after all these years."

In his review for American Songwriter, Rick Moore gave the album three and a half out of five stars, calling it "a well-done CD for baby boomers and their kids". He praised the song selection for including both older and modern standards, and remarked, "America's voices and ranges don't seem to have changed a bit; if anything, these guys are just getting better, as they sing with the confidence that only age can bring."

== Track listing ==
No.	Title	Writer(s)	Length
1.	"America"	Paul Simon	3:40
2.	"A Road Song"	Chris Collingwood, Adam Schlesinger	3:15
3.	"Woodstock"	Joni Mitchell	3:52
4.	"Caroline, No"	Tony Asher, Brian Wilson	3:22
5.	"Someday We'll Know"	Gregg Alexander, Danielle Brisebois, Debra Holland	3:37
6.	"Sailing to Philadelphia" (featuring Mark Knopfler)	Mark Knopfler	4:57
7.	"Crying in My Sleep"	Jimmy Webb	4:41
8.	"Time of the Season"	Rod Argent	3:39
9.	"Something in the Way She Moves"	James Taylor	4:21
10.	"On the Way Home"	Neil Young	2:37
11.	"Til I Hear It from You"	Marshall Crenshaw, Jesse Valenzuela, Robin Wilson	3:45
12.	"My Back Pages"	Bob Dylan	4:23
Total length:			46:09

== Personnel ==
America

- Gerry Beckley – vocals, acoustic guitar
- Dewey Bunnell – vocals, acoustic guitar

with:

- Larry Beaird – banjo, acoustic guitar
- Pat Buchanan – electric guitar
- Mark Knopfler – electric guitar (6)
- Fred Mollin – 12 string acoustic guitar, percussion, synthesizer, backing vocals
- John Willis – acoustic guitar, electric guitar
- Mike Johnson – pedal steel guitar
- Stuart Duncan – fiddle, mandolin
- Larry Paxton – bass guitar
- John Jarvis – piano, Wurlitzer electric piano
- Tony Harrell – harmonium, organ, piano, synthesizer, Wurlitzer
- Van Dyke Parks – accordion
- Greg Morrow – drums, percussion
- Jaime Babbitt – vocals
- Bill Linnane – piano
- Jeffrey Foskett – backing vocals
- Russell Terrell – backing vocals

Production

- Fred Mollin – producer
- Kyle Lehning – engineer, mixing
- Guy Fletcher – engineer
- Mark Linett – overdub engineer
- "Teenage" Dave Salley – overdub engineer
- Greg Calbi – mastering
- Paul Grosso – creative director
- Andrew Kelley – art direction, design
- Chad Griffith – cover photo
- Henry Diltz – photography
- Dmitri Kasterine – photography

== Release history ==
Year	Label	Format	Catalog
2011	eOne	CD	099923213727
