= Traffic and Weather =

Studio album by Fountains of Wayne
- Released: March 28, 2007
- Studios: Stratosphere Sound, New York City, New York; Bearsville Studios, Woodstock, New York
- Genre: Power pop
- Length: 47:27
- Label: Virgin
- Producer: Adam Schlesinger

Fountains of Wayne chronology
Out-of-State Plates (2005)	Traffic and Weather (2007)	Sky Full of Holes (2011)

Singles from Traffic and Weather
- 1. "Someone to Love" Released: February 9, 2007

Traffic and Weather is the fourth studio album by the American rock band Fountains of Wayne. It was first released on March 28, 2007, in Japan, before it was released elsewhere on April 3, 2007, via Virgin Records. The album's lead single "Someone to Love" was released on February 9, 2007. The album peaked at number 97 on the Billboard 200.

== Background ==
While previous Fountains of Wayne albums saw lead singer Chris Collingwood and bassist Adam Schlesinger write songs separately then arrange them with the rest of the band, initial work on their fourth album saw them trying a new approach in which they wanted to get guitarist Jody Porter and drummer Brian Young more involved by jamming together at Bearsville Studios in Woodstock, New York. While it yielded many ideas, it didn't result in any finished songs. In the end, "Strapped for Cash" was the only song developed from the Bearsville sessions, as the band reverted to their usual methods. However, Collingwood was suffering from depression and alcoholism during the making of the album. As a result, he only penned three songs for it — "Fire in the Canyon", "Hotel Majestic" and "Seatbacks and Traytables" — while Schlesinger wrote the rest. (In a Lennon/McCartney-like arrangement, the writing of each individual song is still credited to both Collingwood and Schlesinger, even though both in fact write separately. However, for this album, the publishing credits tell the story — all songs are published by Schlesinger's company Vaguely Familiar Music, except for Collingwood's contributions, which are published by Collingwood's company Monkey Demon Music.)

== Composition and recording ==
Describing their process for the album, Schlesinger said, "We'll bring a song in, then Brian will come up with a feel for it, cut a basic track, then we'll spend a lot of time with Jody experimenting with different guitar parts. On this album more than any, you can really hear Jody's playing and the incredibly wide range that he's capable of." The album was recorded at Bearsville Studios in Woodstock, and at Stratosphere Studios in Manhattan. About the recording sessions, Schlesinger said, "We had these grand ambitions to change our process, we went up to Woodstock and jammed, but in the end, only one thing from that session, 'Strapped for Cash,' turned into an actual song. For the rest of it, we went back to our usual method of writing on our own and bringing in a song to be arranged by everyone. Woodstock was good to get back together and loosen up, but I guess we're pretty set in our ways."

The song "Someone to Love" includes backing vocals from former Smashing Pumpkins and Hole bassist Melissa Auf der Maur. About the song, Schlesinger described it as "a little bit 'Eleanor Rigby'-esque, in that it's about these two lonely people living in New York. It has a disco-y beat, which is something we don't do a lot of." "Fire in the Canyon" contains backing vocals from the Candy Butchers' Mike Viola, "Seatbacks and Traytables" features former Smashing Pumpkins guitarist James Iha, and "Strapped for Cash" features trumpeters Ronnie Buttacavoli and Scott Wendholt; the former trumpeter also plays on "Yolanda Hayes". Speaking on the latter track, Schlesinger said was "about a woman who works at the DMV." On the track "'92 Subaru", he stated, "It kind of sounds like The Doobie Brothers or Little Feat or something."

== Release and promotion ==
On January 19, 2007, the band announced Traffic and Weather for release on April 3, 2007. "Someone to Love" was released on February 9, as the album's lead single. "Strapped for Cash" was also released as a promotional CD single. On March 28, the album was released early in Japan, which contains the bonus track "Sense Into You". Ahead of the album's release, it was streamed on AOL Music. The band released a tour edition of the album exclusively in Japan, on September 26, featuring another bonus track "You Gotta Go" and music videos for "Someone to Love", "Mexican Wine" and "Stacy's Mom".

== Reception ==
Professional ratings
Aggregate scores
Source	Rating
Metacritic	68/100
Review scores
Source	Rating
AllMusic	3.5/5 stars
Alternative Addiction	4/5 stars
The Austin Chronicle	3.5/4 stars
American Songwriter	3/5 stars
Entertainment Weekly	B+
MSN Music (Consumer Guide)	A
Pitchfork	3.0/10
PopMatters	8/10
Rolling Stone	4/5 stars
Stylus Magazine	D−

The album was met with moderate commercial success and mostly positive reviews. At Metacritic, they assign a "weighted average" rating out of 100 to selected independent ratings and reviews from mainstream critics, and the album has received a Metascore of a 68, based on 28 reviews, indicating "generally favorable reviews". Stephen Thomas Erlewine of AllMusic wrote a positive review stating, "It's sturdy, well-written power pop, but it falls prey to some of the faults of craftsmanlike pop -- mainly, it's possible to hear the craft behind the pop instead of just getting sucked into the sugar rush of the melodies. Even so, Traffic and Weather is hardly a bad record, and should satisfy anyone who has loved Fountains of Wayne before, even if it doesn't quite excite them." Writing for The Austin Chronicle, Greg Beets remarked, "Front to back, this 14-song slice of bop-worthy Americana hits the spot like hamburgers and coffee." Michael Gallucci of American Songwriter said the album "sticks to the power-pop formula they perfected on 2003's breakthrough, Welcome Interstate Managers." Blender described the album as having "more witty tales of confused young people caught between destinations".

Darryl Sterdan of Jam! Canoe wrote, "it all deftly mines a wealth of influences, from Revolver-era Beatle-pop to Billy Joel to country to synth-laced new wave to trendy dance-rock. It might not boast an obvious smash single like 'Stacy's Mom', but don't let that deter you -- when it comes to smart, superb songcraft, Fountains of Wayne have still got it going on." Clark Collis of Entertainment Weekly graded the album a B+, writing, "Fortunately, on most of this album, the perfectly chosen details actually add emotional depth to the lyrical vignettes, bringing them to vivid life — ironic, given their often mundane nature."

A negative response to the album came from Matt LeMay of Pitchfork writing, "Fountains of Wayne have proven themselves capable songwriters, both as scrappy underdogs and as pop superstars, but Traffic and Weather finds them treading water in the worst possible way." However, he praised the album's lead single "Someone to Love" as "one of the album's high points." Another negative review came from Ian Cohen of Stylus Magazine, who wrote, "Traffic and Weather finds Fountains Of Wayne offering more of the same and yet decidedly less, working your nerves to the point where you'll wonder whether you ever truly liked them in the first place."

It reached #97 on the Billboard 200 albums chart, and the song "I-95" was named #54 in Rolling Stone's's list of the 100 Best Songs of 2007.

== Track listing ==
All tracks are credited to Chris Collingwood and Adam Schlesinger.

Standard edition
No.	Title	Writer(s)	Length
1.	"Someone to Love"	Schlesinger	3:53
2.	"'92 Subaru"	Schlesinger	3:13
3.	"Yolanda Hayes"	Schlesinger	4:01
4.	"Traffic and Weather"	Schlesinger	3:37
5.	"Fire in the Canyon"	Collingwood	2:47
6.	"This Better Be Good"	Schlesinger	3:04
7.	"Revolving Dora"	Schlesinger	2:42
8.	"Michael and Heather at the Baggage Claim"	Schlesinger	3:42
9.	"Strapped for Cash"	Schlesinger	3:31
10.	"I-95"	Schlesinger	3:08
11.	"Hotel Majestic"	Collingwood	3:28
12.	"Planet of Weed"	Schlesinger	2:46
13.	"New Routine"	Schlesinger	4:14
14.	"Seatbacks and Traytables"	Collingwood	3:31
Total length:			47:27

Japanese bonus track edition
No.	Title	Length
15.	"Sense Into You"	3:30

Japan tour edition
No.	Title	Length
15.	"Sense Into You"	3:30
16.	"You Gotta Go"	2:06
17.	"Someone to Love" (music video)
18.	"Mexican Wine" (music video)
19.	"Stacy's Mom" (music video)

== Personnel ==
Fountains of Wayne

- Chris Collingwood — lead vocals, rhythm guitar, banjo
- Adam Schlesinger — bass, rhythm guitar, keyboards, backing vocals
- Jody Porter — lead guitar, backing vocals
- Brian Young — drums, percussion

Additional musicians

- Melissa Auf der Maur — backing vocals on "Someone to Love"
- Ronnie Buttacavoli — trumpet on "Yolanda Hayes" and "Strapped for Cash"
- Scott Harrell — trumpet on "Strapped for Cash"
- James Iha — guitar on "Seatbacks and Traytables"
- Mike Viola — backing vocals on "Fire in the Canyon"
- Scott Wendholt — trumpet "Strapped for Cash"

Technical personnel

- Adam Schlesinger – producer, mixing
- Geoff Sanoff — engineer
- John Holbrook — engineer, mixing
- Arjun Agerwala — assistant engineer
- Rudyard Lee Cullers — assistant engineer
- Michael Brauer — mixing on "Someone to Love" and "'92 Subaru"
- George Marino — mastering
- Shauna Haider — artwork, design
- Eiji Kikuchi — photography

== Quotes about the album ==
All quotes from Adam Schlesinger.

=== General ===
- "I don't think anybody is counting on us for another one [Stacy's Mom Standard Hit] of those. I hope not."
- "As usual, there are a lot of songs about transportation and travel."
- "Our goal is 12 units, then if we hit 13, it looks like a runaway success."
- "(Billy Corgan) was busy putting that other Smashing Pumpkins reunion together while we were working on this Smashing Pumpkins reunion on our record."

== Charts ==
Chart performance for Traffic and Weather
Chart (2007)	Peak position
Japanese Albums (Oricon)	36
UK Albums (OCC)	172
US Billboard 200	97
US Indie Store Album Sales (Billboard)	13

== Release history ==
Release dates and formats for Traffic and Weather
Region	Date	Format(s)	Edition	Label	Ref.
Japan	March 28, 2007	CD	Bonus track edition	Virgin	
Various	April 3, 2007	CD; digital download	Standard	Virgin	
Japan	September 26, 2007	CD+DVD	Tour edition	Virgin	
