= Out-of-State Plates =

Compilation album by Fountains of Wayne
- Released: June 28, 2005
- Recorded: November 1996 – February 2005
- Genres: Pop; rock
- Length: 81:55
- Label: Virgin
- Producers: Adam Schlesinger; Chris Collingwood; Jody Porter; Brian Young; Mike Denneen

Fountains of Wayne chronology
Welcome Interstate Managers (2003)	Out-of-State Plates (2005)	Traffic and Weather (2007)

Professional ratings
Aggregate scores
Source	Rating
Metacritic	70/100
Review scores
Source	Rating
AllMusic	3/5 stars
The Encyclopedia of Popular Music	3/5 stars
Entertainment Weekly	B+
LAS Magazine	6/10
Pitchfork	5.9/10
PopMatters	5/10
Rolling Stone	3/5 stars
Stylus Magazine	B+
Under the Radar	7/10
The Village Voice	A−

Out-of-State Plates is a double compilation album by the American rock band Fountains of Wayne. It was released on Virgin Records on June 28, 2005.

== Details ==
The album, a two-disc compilation of non-album tracks and previously unreleased recordings spanning the group's entire career, contain two brand new songs, "Maureen" and "The Girl I Can't Forget", as well as the first official release of the group's 1999 version of Britney Spears's "...Baby One More Time". Also featured is a rare live version of the Electric Light Orchestra song, "Can't Get It Out of My Head". According to bassist and songwriter Adam Schlesinger, "The reason we really wanted to do this compilation record is that we do like a lot of these songs and we do want people to be able to hear them. But there are also a few things that are tossed off and goofy and this seems like the proper context to present them in." Lead singer and fellow songwriter Chris Collingwood added, "The album may not hold up thematically like some of our others, but I still really like it."

== Track listing ==
All songs written by Chris Collingwood and Adam Schlesinger, except where noted.

Disc 1
No.	Title	Original album	Length
1.	"Number 45 Sunblock"	Previously unreleased	0:21
2.	"Maureen"	Previously unreleased	3:13
3.	"California Sex Lawyer"	International Pop Overthrow Vol 3 compilation (2003)	2:59
4.	"Janice's Party"	"Radiation Vibe" single (1996)	2:45
5.	"Karpet King"	"Radiation Vibe" single	4:05
6.	"Baby I've Changed"	"Hey Julie" (2004)	2:06
7.	"I Know You Well"	"Denise" single (1999)	3:25
8.	"You're Just Never Satisfied"	"Troubled Times" single (1999)	3:07
9.	"I'll Do the Driving"	"Denise" single	3:23
10.	"Nightlight"	"Red Dragon Tattoo" single (1999)	3:02
11.	"I Want You Around"	"Survival Car" single (1997)	2:39
12.	"Trains and Boats and Planes" (Burt Bacharach cover)	"Stacy's Mom" single (2003)	3:00
13.	"Places"	"Barbara H." single (1997)	1:39
14.	"Can't Get It Out of My Head" (Live; ELO cover)	"Sink to the Bottom" single (1997)	3:53

Disc 2
No.	Title	Original album	Length
1.	"City Folk Morning"	Previously unreleased	0:13
2.	"The Girl I Can't Forget"	Previously unreleased	3:24
3.	"...Baby One More Time" (Britney Spears cover)	Previously unreleased	3:20
4.	"Elevator Up"	"Stacy's Mom" single	4:10
5.	"Comedienne"	"Survival Car" single	3:39
6.	"Kid Gloves"	"Sink to the Bottom" single	3:30
7.	"Today's Teardrops" (Roy Orbison cover)	"Red Dragon Tattoo" single	2:07
8.	"She's Got a Problem" (Live)	"Barbara H." single	3:09
9.	"These Days" (Nico cover)	"Troubled Times" single	2:34
10.	"I Want an Alien for Christmas"	Non-album single (1997)	2:19
11.	"The Man in the Santa Suit"	"I Want An Alien For Christmas" single	2:40
12.	"Chanukah Under the Stars"	"I Want An Alien For Christmas" single	0:15
13.	"Killermont Street" (Aztec Camera cover)	"Hey Julie" single	3:13
14.	"Half a Woman"	Contribution to Launch magazine, Issue 12	2:49
15.	"Small Favors"	Previously unreleased	2:59
16.	"Imperia"	"Radiation Vibe" single	1:57

== Personnel ==
Fountains of Wayne

- Chris Collingwood – lead vocals, rhythm and lead guitar, keyboards, production, engineer
- Jody Porter – lead guitar, backing vocals
- Adam Schlesinger – bass, backing vocals, keyboards, drums, rhythm guitar, production, mixing
- Brian Young – drums, percussion

Additional musicians

- Alan Bezozi – drums
- Ronnie Buttacavoli – trumpet
- Melora Creager – cello
- Kris Woolsey – guitar

Technical personnel

- Atom – assistant engineer
- Neal Casal – drawing, photography
- Andy Chase – mixing
- Rudyard Lee Cullers – assistant engineer
- Joseph Cultice – drawing, photography
- Mike Denneen – engineer, producer
- Giles Duley – drawing, photography
- John Holbrook – mixing
- Audrey Marpol Jackson – drawing, photography
- Tom Lord-Alge – mixing
- Jef Mallett – drawing, photography
- George Marino – mastering
- Gary Maurer – engineer, mixing
- Alan Miller – engineer
- Frank Olinsky – art direction
- Mario Salvati – mixing
- Geoff Sanoff – engineer
- John Siket – engineer, mixing
- Jean-Pierre Sluys – engineer
- Tim Speed – engineer
- Ward Sutton – drawing, photography
- John Travis – engineer

== Charts ==
Chart (2005)	Peak position
US Billboard 200	168
