= Fountains of Wayne (album) =

Studio album by Fountains of Wayne
- Released: October 1, 1996
- Recorded: January and April 1996
- Studios: The Place, New York City, New York
- Genres: Pop; alternative rock; power pop
- Length: 36:17
- Labels: Atlantic; TAG; Scratchie
- Producer: Adam Schlesinger

Fountains of Wayne chronology
Fountains of Wayne (1996)	Utopia Parkway (1999)

Singles from Fountains of Wayne
- 1. "Radiation Vibe" Released: October 11, 1996; 2. "Sink to the Bottom" Released: February 21, 1997; 3. "Leave the Biker" Released: June 6, 1997; 4. "Survival Car" Released: July 14, 1997; 5. "Barbara H." Released: October 6, 1997

Fountains of Wayne is the debut studio album by the American rock band Fountains of Wayne. It was released on October 1, 1996, via TAG Recordings, Scratchie Records, and Atlantic Records. A reissue of the vinyl was released on Yep Roc Records. Recorded at The Place in New York City, it was produced by Adam Schlesinger. The album is supported by five singles: "Radiation Vibe", "Sink to the Bottom", "Leave the Biker", "Survival Car" and "Barbara H.".

The album peaked at number 30 on the US Heatseekers Albums chart. It also reached number 67 on the UK Albums Chart and number 92 on the Scottish Albums Chart. It is the first and only album Chris Collingwood and Adam Schlesinger recorded as a duo.

== Background ==
College friends Chris Collingwood and Adam Schlesinger had formed two failing bands before reconvening in Manhattan, where Collingwood wrote future Fountains of Wayne songs "Joe Rey", "Leave the Biker" and "Radiation Vibe" in half a day, then met with Schlesinger over drinks in order to start another band. According to Collingwood, "Basically, we started all this by writing a bunch of titles on bar napkins and trying to get the other guy to laugh. We'd get drunk and just sit there writing and laughing. We wound up with a list of hundreds of titles. Then we'd decide between the two of us who was going to take which song, and then meet the next night and see what we'd come up with." Eventually it took a week to write the songs that were included on their debut album.

== Recording ==
Fountains of Wayne was recorded when the band was just a duo, before drummer Brian Young and guitarist Jody Porter were recruited to the band. (Young and Porter are listed as bandmembers on later reissues of the record, but not on the original release.) Collingwood and Schlesinger provide all the instrumentation on the recording, except for the bass guitar parts, which were performed by guest bassist Danny Weinkauf, ex-the Belltower. Schlesinger and Porter had also been members of The Belltower, and Weinkauf later played with Lincoln before joining They Might Be Giants. Dominique Durand of the band Ivy, of which Schlesinger was also a member, provided backing vocals on "Survival Car".

In 2016, Schlesinger explained the recording process: "On the recording, I was playing drums, Danny was playing bass and Chris was playing guitar. Then Chris and I would take turns doing some overdubs on guitar or a little keys. After we made the record, Danny decided to do other stuff (he’s now been touring and recording with They Might Be Giants for many years), and that’s when we found Jody and Brian and switched the line-up around, and I started playing bass."

The album's recording took a week and cost 5,000 dollars, with more money spent on mixing. According to Collingwood, "It was deliberate that we were going to write the album and record it quickly, before we had time to think about anything. Prior to this, Adam and I had both been careful, serious songwriters, in the vein of Simon & Garfunkel. We were much more careful about the arrangements and everything. But when we decided to make this record quickly and spontaneously, we figured that since doing it so fast was such a stupid idea, the band needed a stupid name as well."

== Cover ==
The album's cover photo of a little boy clutching a rabbit and posing like a superhero was shot by Nick Waplington. It was also used for the album cover of Plastic Jewels by the UK band Flamingoes, which came out in the US two weeks before this album. The photograph was licensed to both bands, according to Chris Collingwood. Furthermore, he said, "Worse than that, he was directly asked by us if he had licensed it to anybody else and he said no. So, basically, the guy's a complete asshole." However, Waplington had a different response, stating, "There was no malicious intent on my part... For me, if two bands come to this picture independently and want to use it, this just shows that from my point of view they have good taste." As a result, the band changed the album cover in Europe, but remained unchanged in the United States because "it's just too good a picture."

== Release ==
"Radiation Vibe" was released on October 11, 1996, as the lead single from the album. Met with moderate success, the song peaked at number 71 and number 14 on the US Hot 100 Airplay and Alternative Airplay charts, respectively. The album's second single "Sink to the Bottom" was released on February 21, 1997. The song reached the top ten in Finland. "Leave the Biker" was released for radio airplay on June 6, as the third single from the album. On July 14, "Survival Car" was released as the album's fourth single. It peaked at number 53 on the UK Singles Chart. The album's fifth and final single "Barbara H." was released on October 6. The song reached number 94 on the UK Singles Chart.

Songs from it were featured on MTV's 120 Minutes program.

== Critical reception ==
Professional ratings
Review scores
Source	Rating
AllMusic	4/5 stars
Chicago Tribune	3.5/4 stars
The Encyclopedia of Popular Music	4/5 stars
Entertainment Weekly	B
The Guardian	3/5 stars
MSN Music (Expert Witness)	A−
Pitchfork	8.9/10
Q	4/5 stars
The Rolling Stone Album Guide	3.5/5 stars
Wall of Sound	73/100

The album was met with moderate commercial success and favorable reviews. The Toronto Star called the album "an appealing debut of clever, boisterous melodic pop that sounds classic on the first listen." Nitsuh Abebe of AllMusic praised the album, stating "nearly every song is a pop gem. The result is an album that's almost innovative, when you really think about it -- very few albums released in the '90s have been this pleasant, charming, and all-around likeable. The obvious reference points would be Teenage Fanclub, Big Star, and the Posies, but even these don't quite capture the duo's sound." Writing for Chicago Tribune, Greg Kot said, "With their self-effacing charm and melodic verve, Fountains of Wayne refresh the rituals of guitar-pop." Mike Flaherty of Entertainment Weekly described the album as "safe, pleasant, and nondescript."

Robert Christgau of MSN Music wrote, "Lulled into a formalistic revery by their catchy choruses, you assume their content is as null as their groove. But in fact they're so girl-shy it's thematic, and refreshingly empathetic about women with problems, including the one who needs a sick day." Ryan Schreiber of Pitchfork remarked, "these songs are great," however, highlighted "Joe Rey" as one of the album's weaker points, writing, "if 'Joe Rey' had been the first track instead of the third, I may not have listened much further." Erik Himmelsbach of Wall of Sound said the album is "perfectly crafted irreverence that's 100% fun." A mixed review written by Katy Shea of Lollipop Magazine highlighted "Leave the Biker" for its lyrics and music, and "Please Don't Rock Me Tonight" for having a "recognizable hook," but overall, described Fountains of Wayne as "poor man's Weezer." Jonathan Cohen of Nude as the News shared a similar sentiment, comparing the group to Weezer and They Might Be Giants. He felt that the album was nothing more than "disposable pop" and said Schlesinger's old band Ivy had "much more thoughtful songs" than Fountains of Wayne.

The album's lead single "Radiation Vibe" was included in the 2021 edition of Rolling Stone's "500 Greatest Songs of All Time".

== Track listing ==
All tracks are written by Chris Collingwood and Adam Schlesinger.

No.	Title	Length
1.	"Radiation Vibe"	3:40
2.	"Sink to the Bottom"	3:12
3.	"Joe Rey"	2:40
4.	"She's Got a Problem"	3:26
5.	"Survival Car"	2:02
6.	"Barbara H."	3:22
7.	"Sick Day"	4:33
8.	"I've Got a Flair"	2:52
9.	"Leave the Biker"	2:42
10.	"You Curse at Girls"	2:05
11.	"Please Don't Rock Me Tonight"	2:50
12.	"Everything's Ruined"	2:44
Total length:		36:08

Japanese Bonus Track
No.	Title	Length
13.	"Karpet King"	4:05
Total length:		40:13

== Personnel ==
Fountains of Wayne

- Chris Collingwood – vocals, guitar, keyboards; production
- Adam Schlesinger – drums, guitar, keyboards, vocals; production, mixing on "Sink to the Bottom"

Additional musicians

- Danny Weinkauf – bass guitar
- Dominique Durand – backing vocals on "Survival Car"

Technical personnel

- Gary Maurer – engineer, mixing on "Sink to the Bottom"
- Greg Calbi – mastering
- Chris Shaw – mixing on all tracks except "Sink to the Bottom"
- Eric Tew – assistant mixing

== Charts ==
Chart performance for Fountains of Wayne
Chart (1996–97)	Peak position
Australian Albums (ARIA)	104
Dutch Albums (Album Top 100)	83
Scottish Albums (Official Charts)	92
UK Albums (Official Charts)	67
US Heatseekers Albums (Billboard)	20
