= Lisa Prank =

American pop punk band

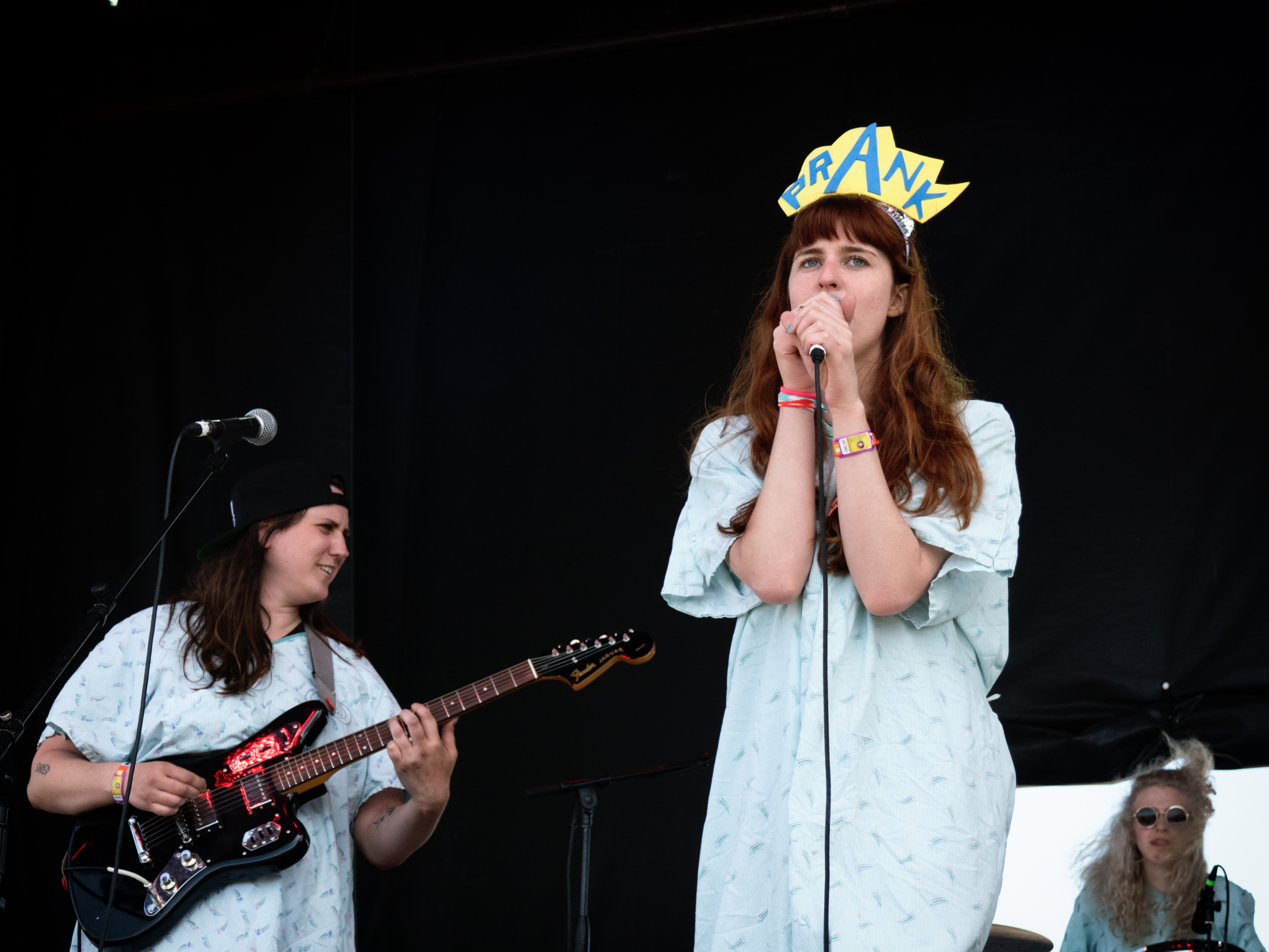

Background information
- Origin: Seattle, Washington, United States
- Genres: Pop-punk
- Years active: 2013–present
- Labels: Sub Pop Records., That Summer Feeling Records, Father/Daughter Records, Miscreant Records
- Members: Robin Edwards

Lisa Prank is an American pop punk musical band currently based in Seattle, Washington, United States.

== History ==
Robin Edwards started the band in her hometown of Denver, Colorado, receiving recognition in the pop punk community with her cover of Blink 182's "Dammit (Growing Up)". The debut release "Crush on the World" was met with critical acclaim.

In 2014, Vice Magazine described her song "Crush on the World" positively: "Lisa’s lyrics succinctly communicate my feelings about every relationship I’ve ever had." The dominant local weekly newspaper The Stranger has called Lisa Prank "lo-fidelity fireball." Lisa Prank's alternative punk rock music scene was profiled for a feature in a Seattle Weekly feature, "Punk Rock Is Not Bullshit." A picture of Lisa Prank was featured on the front cover of the newspaper.

Lisa Prank has performed alongside bands such as Waxahatchee, Tacocat and Pony Time. She sang on the upcoming album by Childbirth for Suicide Squeeze Records.

In 2018, Lisa Prank entered into a quarrel with Elon Musk on Twitter. The exchange lasted for several days. The issue was in regards to Musk allegedly not paying her father, Colorado artist and potter Tom Edwards, for using one of his designs in the Tesla car interface without permission. During the exchange Edwards maintained, “My main mission here is that artists should get paid for their work.” Members of Childbirth, Tacocat, Chastity Belt, and singer Vanessa Carlton defended her with their personal Twitter accounts. The story was picked up by music sources like Pitchfork, Stereogum, Vice, and The Guardian.

Lisa Prank performed the Fountains of Wayne song "Little Red Light" on the tribute album Saving for a Custom Van, which was released June 16, 2020 and is distributed via Bandcamp. The album was recorded in honor of FOW co-founder Adam Schlesinger, who died of COVID-19.

Lisa Prank performed the Blink-182 song "Waggy" on the tribute compilation album It's Never Over Til It's Done - A blink-182 Covers Comp, which was released August 7, 2020 and is distributed via Bandcamp. The title of the album comes from a lyric in the song "Waggy."

== Discography ==
=== Albums ===
- Crush on the World - That Summer Feeling Records (2014)
- Adult Teen - Father/Daughter Records / Miscreant Records (2016)
- Perfect Love Song - Father/Daughter Records (2019)
