= The Belltower =

American alternative rock band

- The Belltower, 1992. L-R: Nino Dmytryszyn, Britta Phillips and Jody Porter.

Background information
- Origin: New York City, New York, USA
- Genres: Alternative rock, shoegazing, dream pop
- Years active: c.1990–1996
- Labels: Ultimate, East West
- Past members: Jody Porter; Britta Phillips; Nino Dmytryszyn; Mark Browning; Adam Schlesinger

The Belltower was an American alternative rock band from New York City often associated with the shoegazing scene, with members who later joined Luna and Fountains of Wayne.

== History ==
The band was formed by singers/guitarists Britta Phillips and Jody Porter in 1990. They added Mark Browning, before relocating to London in 1990, where they recorded their debut EP Exploration Day, with Terry Bickers acting as producer. Though considered part of the "shoegazing" genre, in reality they were more pop-oriented, gaining comparisons with artists including The Cure, The Sundays, and Swervedriver. The song "Exploration Day" was named by the NME as "single of the week". Two more singles followed before the band's only album, Popdropper, was released in 1992. None of the singles or albums charted, and Phillips and Porter returned to the United States. The band reappeared in 1995 as a trio of Porter, Phillips and new drummer Tommy Hamer, although there would only be one further release, the "Underwatertown" single in 1995, before the band split up in 1996. Before the split, Adam Schlesinger played bass with the band on some live dates, bringing the band back up to a quartet.

Porter later performed with Fountains of Wayne, for whom Schlesinger played bass, and later formed Astrojet. Schlesinger also played with Ivy. Phillips joined Ultrababyfat, and later Ben Lee and Luna, after which she continued a partnership with Dean Wareham.

== Members ==
- Jody Porter - vocals/guitar
- Britta Phillips - vocals/guitar
- Nino Dmytryszyn - drums
- Mark Browning - bass/vocals

== Discography ==
=== Singles, EPs ===
- Exploration Day EP (1991) Ultimate
- Tour 7" (1991)
- "(Lost) In Hollow" (1991) Ultimate (also released as a promo in the US on east West)
- "Flight" (1992) Ultimate
- "Underwatertown" (1995) Scratchie

=== Albums ===
- Popdropper (1992) Ultimate/East West
