= Britta Phillips =

American musical artist and actress

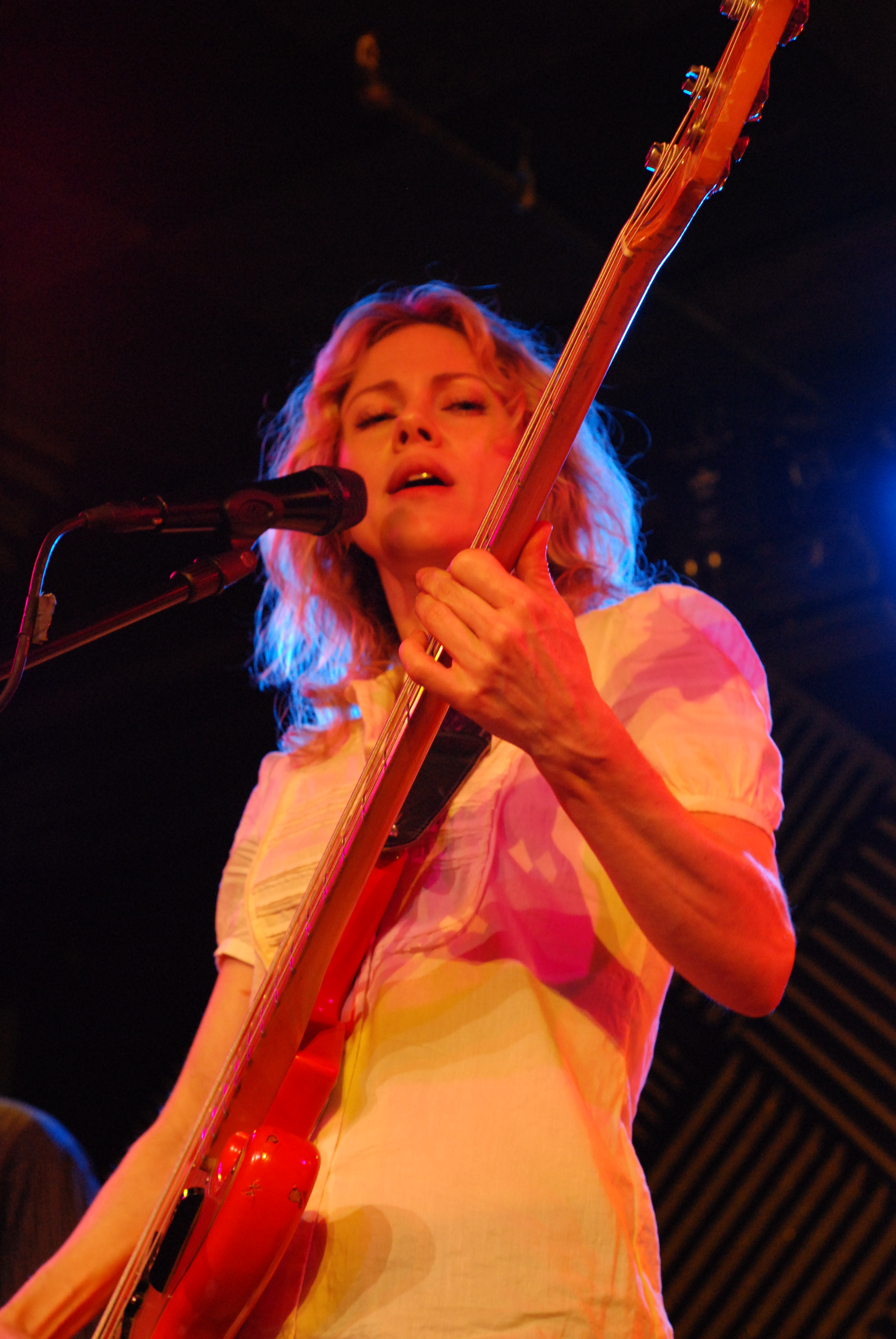
- Phillips performing live in New York City, New York, in 2007
- Born: June 11, 1963 (age 63); Boyne City, Michigan, U.S.
- Occupations: Singer-songwriter; musician; record producer; actress; voice actress
- Years active: 1985–present
- Spouse: Jody Porter (divorced) Dean Wareham (m. 2006)
- Parents: Peter Phillips; Joan Binkley
- Musical career
- Genre: Pop rock
- Instruments: Vocals; bass guitar
- Website: brittaphillips.com

Britta Phillips (born June 11, 1963) is an American singer-songwriter, musician, record producer, and actress.

Phillips' music career spans more than 30 years. She came to prominence in the mid-1980s as the singing voice of the title character of the animated television series Jem. With her husband, Dean Wareham, she has also been a member of the bands Luna and is one half of the duo Dean & Britta; she has also had a solo career, which has included one studio album, Luck or Magic (2016).

Phillips has also been a film, television, and voice actress, including a co-starring role in the 1988 music comedy-drama film Satisfaction and multiple voice acting roles on the Adult Swim animated television series Moral Orel and Mary Shelley's Frankenhole.

== Early life ==
Britta Phillips was born in Boyne City, Michigan, but grew up in Bucks County, Pennsylvania. Her father, Peter, was a musician, songwriter, jingle composer, and a former music teacher of Paul Simon; he also worked on several Broadway plays. At the age of 19, Phillips moved to Brooklyn, New York, to pursue a career in music. In 1985, Phillips's father, through his musical contacts, secured an audition for her for the role of Jem in the animated TV series Jem and the Holograms. Phillips was hired on the strength of her demo for the show's theme song, and that version was the one used in its opening credits.

== Music career ==
Phillips was a member of the bands The Belltower and Ultrababyfat in the 1990s and Luna from 2000 to the present day. Phillips has released albums with fellow Luna bandmate Dean Wareham as the duo Dean & Britta.

Phillips and Wareham have also composed original score for the Noah Baumbach films Mistress America and The Squid and the Whale, and the Morgan J. Freeman film Just Like the Son and more recently contributed additional score and songs for the Olivier Assays series Irma Vep.

In 2001, Phillips provided vocals on the Anika Moa album Thinking Room. In 2007, Phillips produced and recorded a cover of Neil Young's "I Am a Child" for the benefit CD Cinnamon Girl - Women Artists Cover Neil Young For Charity. In 2010, Phillips performed vocals on the MGMT single "It's Working" from their album Congratulations. 2016 saw the release of her long-awaited debut solo album, Luck or Magic. It contains five covers, along with five original songs.

In 2023, Phillips was featured on the Gunship album Unicorn adding vocals to the techno/dance rock "Holographic Heart".

== Acting career ==
Phillips's first acting job was as the singing voice of the lead character in the animated series Jem, alongside actress and singer Samantha Newark, who provided Jem's speaking voice. The series ran from 1985 to 1988.

In 1988, she co-starred in the teen rock band movie Satisfaction, which also starred Justine Bateman, Julia Roberts, Liam Neeson, Trini Alvarado, and Scott Coffey; the film is primarily known today as Julia Roberts's first credited big-screen role. Phillips performed several songs during the movie and is featured on the soundtrack album. Also in 1988, she guest-starred on the cult TV show Crime Story, in the episode "Always a Blonde"; she played a former homecoming queen turned high-class escort in Las Vegas, Nevada. She followed that with a starring role as a nurse in the pilot episode of the short-lived TV series Nightingales. From 2005 to 2008, she voiced various characters for the Adult Swim series Moral Orel, most notably Bloberta Puppington. In 2006, she featured as herself in the Luna band documentary Tell Me Do You Miss Me. Since 2010, Phillips has voiced various characters in Mary Shelley's Frankenhole, most noticeably Elizabeth Frankenstein. Both Moral Orel and Mary Shelley's Frankenhole were created by Dino Stamatopoulos. In 2010, Phillips appeared alongside Wareham on Yo Gabba Gabba!, in the episode titled "Ride".

Phillips had a cameo, along with Dean Wareham, in the 2012 Noah Baumbach film Frances Ha, written by Baumbach and Greta Gerwig.

== Radio and podcast appearances ==
Phillips appeared on Ken Reid's TV Guidance Counselor podcast on December 9, 2016.

== Personal life ==
Phillips married musician Jody Porter, but the couple later divorced. In 2006, she married musician and Luna bandmate Dean Wareham during the recording sessions for their album Back Numbers.

== Discography ==
Solo album

Year	Title	Label
2016	Luck or Magic	Double Feature

Singles

Year	Title	B-side
1984	"Through the Eyes"	"Through the Eyes" (instrumental)
1985	"Don't Think Twice" (Promo-only)	"Don't Think Twice"
1986	"I Just Can't Help Myself"	"I Just Can't Help Myself" (instrumental)
2009	"Shine Your Light" (with James Iha)	"You Can't Escape"
2014	"Love" (with Dean Wareham)	"Fallin' in Love" (with Dean Wareham)
