= Sink to the Bottom =

Single by Fountains of Wayne

from the album Fountains of Wayne
- B-side: "Can't Get It Out of My Head" (live)
- Released: February 21, 1997
- Recorded: 1996–97
- Genre: Power pop
- Length: 3:12
- Label: Atlantic
- Songwriters: Chris Collingwood; Adam Schlesinger
- Producer: Adam Schlesinger

Fountains of Wayne singles chronology
"Radiation Vibe" (1996)	"Sink to the Bottom" (1997)	"Leave the Biker" (1997)

Music video
- "Sink to the Bottom" on YouTube

"Sink to the Bottom" is the second single by Fountains of Wayne, from their debut studio album Fountains of Wayne. The song was first released on February 21, 1997, for radio airplay. It was later released in Europe on April 28, 1997, and charted in the UK at No. 42 on May 10, 1997. It also reached No. 7 in Norway in 1998.

== Composition and recording ==
"Sink to the Bottom" was written by Chris Collingwood and Adam Schlesinger, the latter also produced the track. The song was recorded at the Place in New York City between January to April 1996. A live cover of "Can't Get It Out of My Head" originally performed by Jeff Lynne, was recorded at the Jacksonville Coliseum, Jacksonville, Florida on February 2, 1997.

== Release ==
The two other tracks on the single – "Kid Gloves" and a live version of "Can't Get It Out of My Head" – were unavailable on any Fountains of Wayne album until the release of Out-of-State Plates in 2005.

== Critical reception ==
In a retrospective review on the 25th anniversary of Fountains of Wayne, Chris Conaton of PopMatters wrote on the song, "The rest of the song is also very simple [...] Both refrains are catchy earworms, and Schlesinger and Collingwood resist the urge to overcomplicate, just letting the song be two big hooks." Morgan Enos of Billboard named the track as one of Schlesinger's "15 Greatest Songs", writing, "it's hard to think of a more prototypically 1996 radio-rock song than 'Sink to the Bottom' — despondent yet triumphant with a melodic fuzzbomb of a chorus."

== Music video ==
The music video for "Sink to the Bottom" premiered via MTV on March 11, 1997, directed by Sisyphus Applebaum.

== Usage in media ==
The song was used as the outro for the movie Bongwater, on How I Met Your Mother, in the episode "Atlantic City" and outro song for The Marvelous Mrs. Maisel, Se.3 Ep.7 "Marvelous Radio". It was also featured on a Finnish beer commercial, according to Schlesinger.

== Track listing ==
CD single
No.	Title	Length
1.	"Sink to the Bottom"	3:12
2.	"Can't Get It Out of My Head" (live)	3:52
3.	"Kid Gloves"	3:31

== Credits ==
Credits for "Sink to the Bottom" adapted from CD liner notes.

Fountains of Wayne

- Chris Collingwood – vocals, guitar, keyboards
- Adam Schlesinger – drums, guitar, keyboards, vocals; bass guitar (track 2)
- Danny Weinkauf – bass guitar (tracks 1 & 3)
- Jody Porter – lead guitar, backing vocals (track 2)
- Brian Young – drums (track 2)

Additional personnel

- Engineered by Gary Maurer
- Mixed by Adam Schlesinger, Gary Maurer (track 1); Chris Shaw, Eric Tew (track 3)
- Mastered by Greg Calbi
- Recorded in January and April 1996 at The Place, New York City (tracks 1 & 3)
- Mixed at Greene Street Recording, New York City
- Mastered at Masterdisk, New York City

== Charts ==
Chart performance for "Sink to the Bottom"
Chart (1997–98)	Peak position
Australia (ARIA)	153
Finland (Suomen virallinen lista)	7
Norway (VG-lista)	7
Scottish Singles Sales (Official Charts)	36
UK Singles (Official Charts)	42

== Release history ==
Release dates and formats for "Sink to the Bottom"
Region	Date	Format	Label	Ref.
United States	February 21, 1997	Modern rock	Atlantic	
Europe	April 28, 1997	CD	Atlantic	
