= Survival Car =

Single by Fountains of Wayne

from the album Fountains of Wayne
- B-side: "Comedienne"
- Released: July 14, 1997
- Recorded: January – April 1996
- Genre: Power pop
- Length: 2:04
- Label: Atlantic
- Songwriters: Chris Collingwood; Adam Schlesinger
- Producer: Schlesinger

Fountains of Wayne singles chronology
"Leave the Biker" (1997)	"Survival Car" (1997)	"Barbara H." (1997)

"Survival Car" is the fourth single by Fountains of Wayne, from their debut studio album Fountains of Wayne. It was released on July 14, 1997, and charted in the UK at No. 53 on July 26, 1997.

== Composition and recording ==
Backing vocals on "Survival Car" were performed by Dominique Durand of Ivy, a band which also featured the song's co-writer Adam Schlesinger. It was recorded between January to April 1996, at the Place in New York City.

== Release ==
The two other tracks on the single – "Comedienne" and the demo version of "I Want You Around" – were unavailable on any Fountains of Wayne album until the release of Out-of-State Plates in 2005.

== Critical reception ==
Ryan Swan of The Badger Herald described "Survival Car" as the "most arresting song [...] two-minute sugar rush." Following the death of Schlesinger, Goldmine published their "10 Great Fountains of Wayne Songs" list, where "Survival Car" was listed. Writer John M. Borack wrote, "This brief little ditty cruises along with an instrumental urgency that borders on punky and some cool 'ooh la la' backing vox on the second verse. Always a live favorite, and one the band usually took on at warp speed."

== Track listing ==
CD single
No.	Title	Length
1.	"Survival Car"	2:04
2.	"Comedienne"	3:41
3.	"I Want You Around" (4 track demo)	2:39

== Personnel ==
Credits for "Survival Car" adapted from CD liner notes.

Fountains of Wayne

- Chris Collingwood – vocals, guitar, keyboards
- Adam Schlesinger – drums, guitar, keyboards, vocals, production

Additional musicians

- Danny Weinkauf – bass guitar
- Dominique Durand – backing vocals

Technical personnel

- Engineered by Gary Maurer
- Mixed by Chris Shaw, Eric Tew
- Mastered by Greg Calbi
- Recorded in January and April 1996 at The Place, New York City
- Mixed at Greene Street Recording, New York City
- Mastered at Masterdisk, New York City

== Charts ==
Chart performance for "Survival Car"
Chart (1997)	Peak position
Scottish Singles Sales (Official Charts)	58
UK Singles (Official Charts)	53

== Release history ==
Release dates and formats for "Survival Car"
Region	Date	Format	Label	Ref.
Europe	July 14, 1997	CD	Atlantic	
