= Radiation Vibe =

Single by Fountains of Wayne

from the album Fountains of Wayne
- B-side: "Karpet King"
- Released: October 11, 1996
- Recorded: January – April 1996
- Genre: Alternative rock; power pop; pop rock
- Length: 3:41
- Label: Atlantic
- Songwriters: Chris Collingwood; Adam Schlesinger
- Producer: Schlesinger

Fountains of Wayne singles chronology
"Radiation Vibe" (1996)	"Sink to the Bottom" (1997)

Music video
- "Radiation Vibe" on YouTube

"Radiation Vibe" is the debut single by Fountains of Wayne, from their debut studio album Fountains of Wayne. It was released on October 11, 1996, on Atlantic Records. Written by Chris Collingwood and Adam Schlesinger, the track is described as power pop.

The song peaked at number 71 on the Billboard Hot 100 Airplay, as well as number 14 on the US Alternative Airplay chart. It also reached number 32 on the UK Singles Chart. In 2021, Rolling Stone listed the song at the 380th spot on their "500 Greatest Songs" list.

== Background and recording ==
The song was recorded at the Place in New York City between January to April 1996. It was mixed by Chris Shaw and Eric Tew at Greene Street Recording, while it was mastered by Greg Calbi at Masterdisk in New York City.

== Composition and lyrics ==
"Radiation Vibe" was written by Chris Collingwood and Adam Schlesinger, the latter also produced the track. According to Schlesinger, the song was what "really started the band." He also said, "Chris wrote 'Radiation Vibe' one day and played it for me. He just wrote it as a goof, but I was like, 'Man, that's a great song.' I don't know what it is about that song, but it's got some kind of magic, fun quality to it that we never really had in anything before."

== Release ==
"Radiation Vibe" was released in Europe as a vinyl single with "Karpet King" as the B-side. There was also a CD single which featured two other tracks, "Janice's Party" and "Imperia". All of these except "Radiation Vibe" were unavailable on any Fountains of Wayne album until the release of Out-of-State Plates in 2005.

== Critical reception ==
Andy Crysell made the song the NME's single of the week, saying that "On one side, there is extreme dippiness, on the other there is immense soppiness and, somehow, FOW are making neat work of this precarious act."

Following the death of Schlesinger, Goldmine published their "10 Great Fountains of Wayne Songs" list, where "Radiation Vibe" was listed. Writer John M. Borack stated the song "chugs along quite nicely, with a set of lyrics that don't quite make perfect sense, but with a chorus that soars into the stratosphere." The New York Times released their "Adam Schlesinger's 30 Essential Songs" list, featuring "Radiation Vibe". Writer Rob Tannenbaum described the track as a "lightly adorned power pop that became richer on subsequent albums, while keeping the downtrodden, slightly resentful tone." On NME's "Adam Schlesinger's 10 best songs" list, author Mark Grassick wrote on the song, "Sublime hooks, a tasteful amount of grit and a chorus that seems to reach the heavens – it's '90s alt-rock at its absolute finest." In the 2021 edition of Rolling Stone Magazine's "500 Greatest Songs", "Radiation Vibe" was placed at the 380 spot. In a retrospective review, Annie Zaleski of The A.V. Club wrote, "Repetitive, whirligig-like guitar riffs; a loud-quiet-loud arrangement; and a dreamy, classic 'baby, baby, baby' chorus call make the song feel simultaneously uber-'90s and surprisingly timeless." On the 25th anniversary of Fountains of Wayne, Chris Conaton of PopMatters also wrote a retrospective review, who said of the song "is essentially Fountains of Wayne fully formed on their very first track. Sometimes the lyrics are clever, and sometimes they're nonsense. The song grooves along until it rocks. The whole thing is a big chunk of catchy pop-rock music that isn't trying to be tough or cool or follow the alternative rock trends of 1996."

== Chart performance ==
The single charted in the UK at No. 32 on March 22, 1997. It also reached No. 14 on the US Billboard Alternative Songs chart in January 1997. In Australia, the single peaked at No. 95 in March 1997.

== Music video ==
The music video for "Radiation Vibe" premiered via MTV on October 29, 1996, directed by Clark Eddy.

== Track listing ==
US promo single
No.	Title	Length
1.	"Radiation Vibe"	3:41

CD single
No.	Title	Length
1.	"Radiation Vibe"	3:41
2.	"Karpet King"	4:04
3.	"Janice's Party"	2:46
4.	"Imperia"	1:57

7" Vinyl
No.	Title	Length
1.	"Radiation Vibe"	3:41
2.	"Karpet King"	4:04

== Personnel ==
Credits for "Radiation Vibe" adapted from CD liner notes.

Fountains of Wayne

- Chris Collingwood – vocals, guitar, keyboards; production
- Adam Schlesinger – drums, guitar, keyboards, vocals; production

Additional personnel

- Danny Weinkauf – bass guitar

Technical

- Engineered by Gary Maurer
- Mixed by Chris Shaw, Eric Tew
- Mastered by Greg Calbi
- Recorded in January and April 1996 at The Place, New York City
- Mixed at Greene Street Recording, New York City
- Mastered at Masterdisk, New York City

== Charts ==
Chart performance for "Radiation Vibe"
Chart (1997)	Peak position
Australia (ARIA)	95
Scotland Singles (OCC)	29
UK Singles (OCC)	32
US Radio Songs (Billboard)	71
US Alternative Airplay (Billboard)	14

== Release history ==
Release dates and formats for "Radiation Vibe"
Region	Date	Format	Label	Ref.
United States	October 11, 1996	Modern rock	Atlantic	
United States	1996	CD	Atlantic	
Australia	1996	CD Maxi-single	Atlantic	
United States	January 17, 1997	Mainstream rock	Atlantic	
Europe	March 10, 1997	CD; vinyl	Atlantic	
