= Brian Young (drummer) =

American drummer (b. 1968)

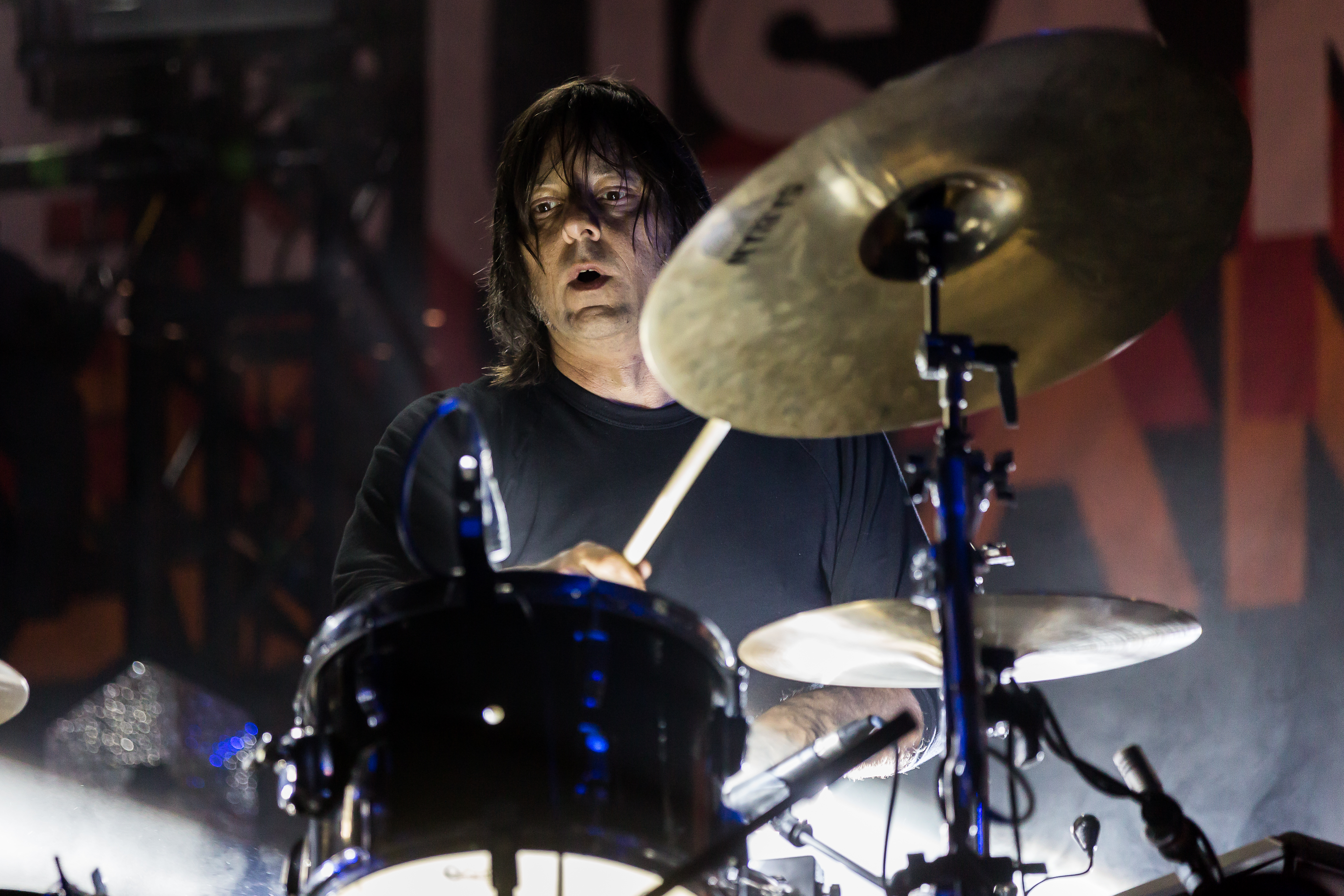
- Young in 2018

Background information
- Born: July 16, 1968 (age 57); Pittsburgh, Pennsylvania, U.S.
- Origin: Los Angeles, California, U.S.
- Genres: Power pop, rock
- Occupations: Drummer, producer, mix engineer, programmer
- Instruments: Drums, percussion, guitar
- Member of: Fountains of Wayne
- Formerly of: The Jesus and Mary Chain, The Posies

Brian Young (born July 16, 1968) is an American drummer and music producer. He is best known as the drummer of the New York–based, Grammy-nominated power pop band Fountains of Wayne and Seattle-based alternative rock band The Posies. From 2012 to 2021 Young was the drummer for the Scottish alternative rock band The Jesus and Mary Chain.

== Early career ==
Young was born in Pittsburgh, Pennsylvania, and grew up in Bethel Park. At the start of his teenage years, Young’s family moved to Prescott, Arizona, where Brian began playing drums. He attended Bradshaw Mountain High School, where he graduated in 1986. His first professional experience was filling in for his drum teacher at gigs, where other musicians expressed surprise at seeing a fifteen year-old kid show up to play. He sat outside between sets, because he wasn’t old enough to enter the clubs. His first paying gig was with a country and western band, and playing weekends in Prescott, he learned to play country, R&B, dance, and Top 40.

After high school, Young moved to Los Angeles. He worked a variety of gigs, including a tour playing for Junko Yagami, known as the “Japanese Madonna.” In 1994 Young joined The Posies and played on their fourth album, Amazing Disgrace (Geffen, 1996). He toured extensively with the band in the United States, Asia, Australia, and Europe. With Young on drums, The Posies performed with Burt Bacharach on his song "What the World Needs Now (Is Love)" that was featured in the 1997 movie, Austin Powers: International Man of Mystery.

== Fountains of Wayne ==
While The Posies were on hiatus, Young joined Adam Schlesinger and Chris Collingwood and formed Fountains of Wayne. Their first self-titled album tied for second place in the Billboard magazine's 1996 Critics' Poll and their single "Radiation Vibe" hit number 14 on the Billboard Modern Rock Tracks in 1997. In 2021, “Radiation Vibe” placed #380 in Rolling Stone’s updated list of the 500 best songs of all time.

After recording and touring for The Posies fifth album, Success (1998), Young recorded with Fountains of Wayne on their second album Utopia Parkway (1999).

In 2003 the band released Welcome Interstate Managers, which featured the single "Stacy's Mom," a song that reached #3 on the Billboard Top 40 Mainstream Chart and earned a gold record. The video of “Stacy’s Mom” featured model Rachel Hunter was in heavy high rotation MTV. Welcome Interstate Managers reached #115 on the Billboard Top 200. The song “All Kinds of Time,” about a football star, was used to promote the 2005 NFL season.

Young went on to record three more albums with Fountains of Wayne, 2007’s Traffic and Weather, which reached number 97 on the Billboard Top 200 charts, and 2011’s Sky Full of Holes. He also played on the band’s double disc collection of unreleased material and fan favorites, 2005’s Out-of-State Plates.

Voted the #3 best alternative rock drummer in the DRUM! Magazine 2006 Readers’ Poll, Young is known for his versatile drumming style. In a 2007 profile in Modern Drummer, Young said, “The cool thing about Fountains of Wayne is that we do a whole lot of different stylistic stuff.” In that same interview, Young said he was influenced by “the great studio drummers of the 1970s and to some degree, every musician that I’ve ever heard or seen.”

== Post-Fountains work ==
In 2012, Young replaced Loz Colbert in the Scottish alternative rock band, Jesus and Mary Chain, which had reunited in 2007. He has toured extensively with the band, including a world tour marking the 30th anniversary of their album Psychocandy. Young appeared on the band’s 2017 album, Damage and Joy, their first studio album since 1998.

Young has produced for a number of artists, among them Broken Country Girls, Paul Skinner, Silver Relics, Xolie Morra and The Strange Kind, Ramirez Exposure, and Javier Escovedo.

His artist profile for Sabian Cymbals notes his “hard-hitting, aggressive style in tune with today’s modern rock.” Young has recorded or performed with artists such as America, Mandy Moore, Wavves, Ivy, Burt Bacharach, Butterfly Boucher, Max Collins, Jim Carroll, Afghan Whigs, Skyward, the Long Winters, and The Monkees. He also recorded more than 100 tracks for the Emmy-award winning and cult favorite television show, Crazy Ex-Girlfriend.

In 2013, Young appeared on an episode of the short-lived TBS comedy series Wedding Band, where he played a one-armed drummer in a Def Leppard cover band called Armageddon It!

In addition to Sabian Cymbals, Young endorses Ludwig Drums, Vater Percussion, LP Percussion, and Big Fat Snare Drum.

Young currently owns and operates a recording studio in Encino, California.
