= Chris Collingwood =

American musician (born 1967)

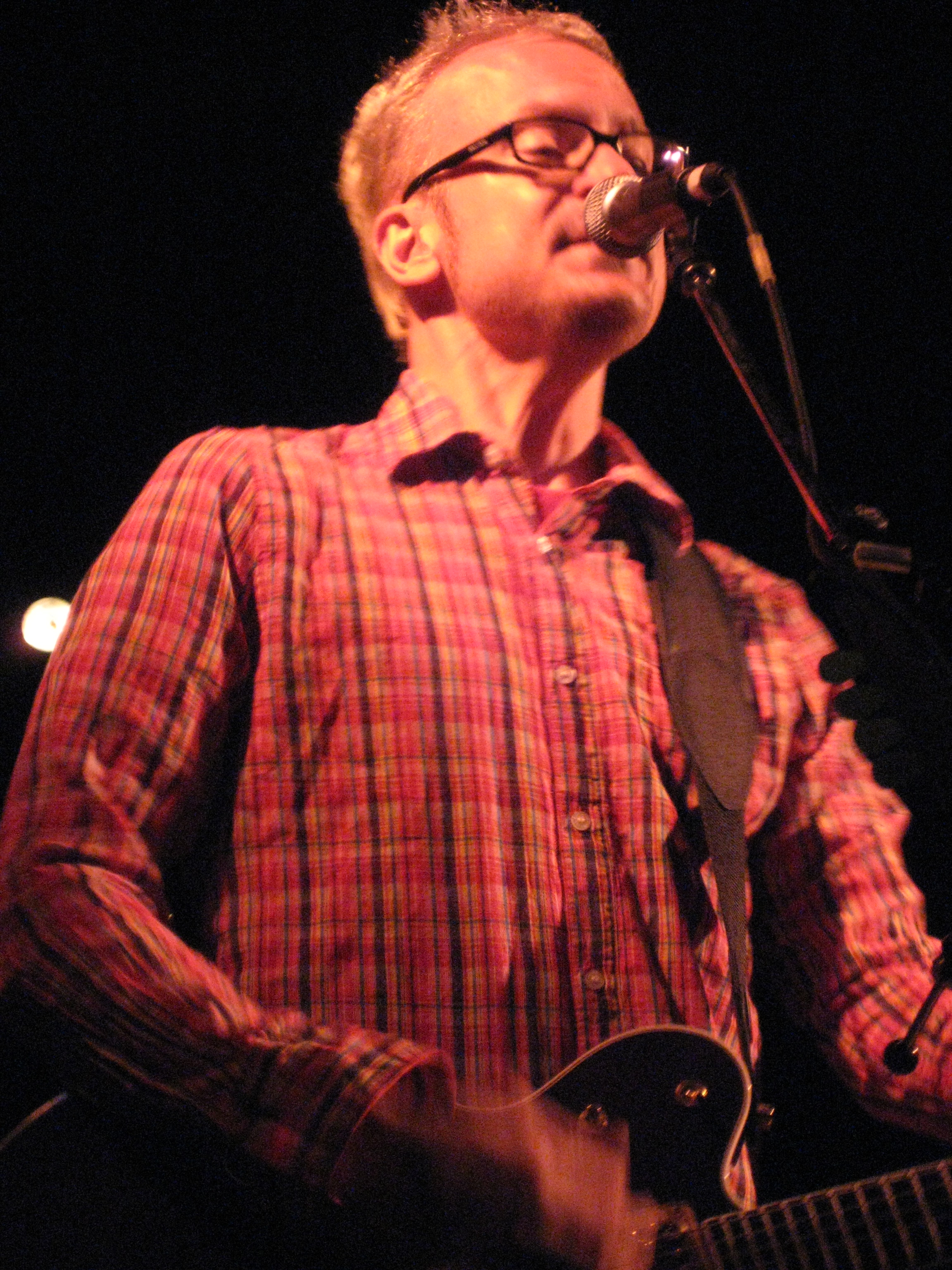
- Collingwood performing in 2007

Background information
- Born: October 3, 1967 (age 59); United Kingdom
- Origin: Sellersville, Pennsylvania, U.S.
- Genres: Power pop, rock
- Occupations: Guitarist, songwriter, producer
- Instruments: Guitar, vocals, keyboards
- Years active: 1995–present

Chris Collingwood (born October 3, 1967) is an American musician, singer, and songwriter. He is best known as the lead vocalist and founding member of the power pop band Fountains of Wayne.

== Early life and education ==
Collingwood was born on October 3, 1967 and grew up in Sellersville, Pennsylvania.

He graduated from The Hill School in Pottstown, Pennsylvania, and then attended Williams College in Williamstown, Massachusetts, where he met future Fountains of Wayne bandmate Adam Schlesinger. The two collaborated several times prior to forming Fountains of Wayne in 1995.

== Fountains of Wayne ==
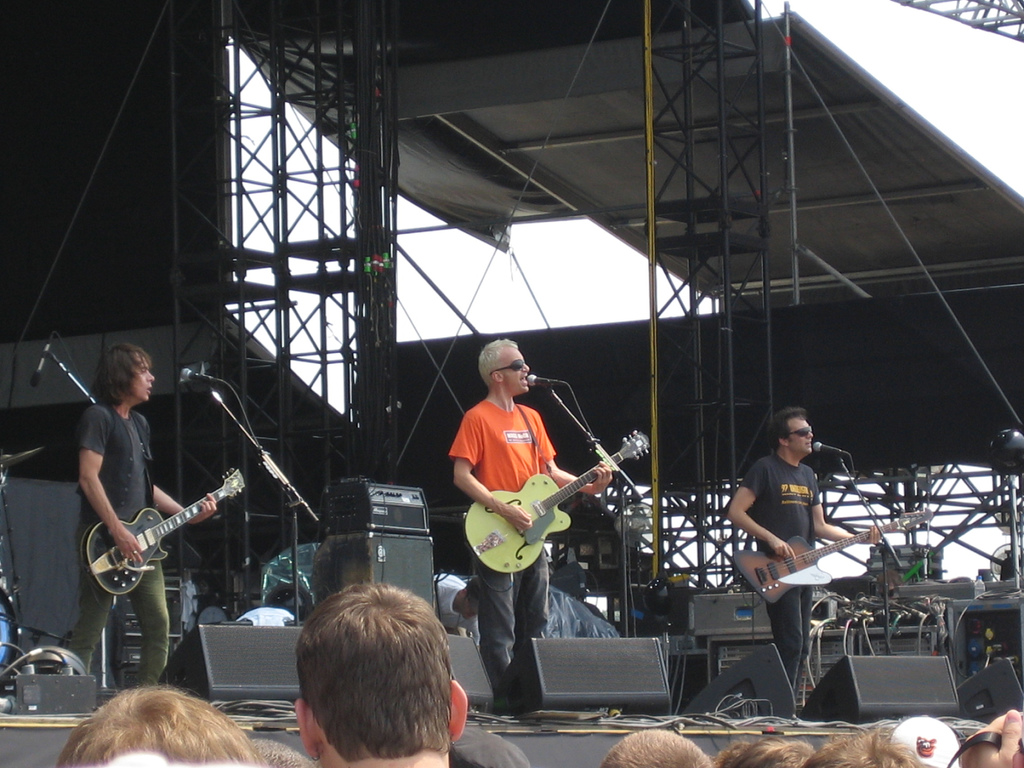
Collingwood (middle/orange shirt) performing with Fountains of Wayne in Baltimore in October 2007

In 1995, Collingwood and Schlesinger formed Fountains of Wayne. They recorded one album, Fountains of Wayne, before recruiting Jody Porter and Brian Young in 1997.

Though Collingwood and Schlesinger shared cowriter credit for all original Fountains of Wayne material, for most of their career together, they wrote their songs separately. The band was nominated for a Grammy Award for their song "Stacy's Mom", in 2004, which charted at number 21 on the Billboard Hot 100.

In 2006, the band was touring in Tokyo, Japan, when Collingwood experienced a mental breakdown. Prior to his breakdown, he had been experiencing hallucinations for two days, and was sleep deprived and mentally unstable to the point that he did not believe he was actually in Japan. The performance was cancelled, and Collingwood spent time recovering in hospitals in both Japan and the United States. He later recalled the event, saying:

Every town you go to, they want there to be a party and everywhere you go, there's free liquor...You end up turning your entire tour into a party. When we were in Japan in 2006, I hadn't slept in four, five days and started hallucinating in Tokyo. I ended up going to the hospital and they were pumping me full of sedatives to put me to sleep. It happens to meth heads – not sleeping, seeing shadow people and having horrific hallucinations. Nothing ever scared me more than just not being able to control my own brain or trust what I'm seeing, hearing or feeling.

After many years as an alcoholic, Collingwood became sober by 2011. He would become more involved in the production of their album, Sky Full of Holes, although, it would end up being the hardest for the group to make, collectively:

The most recent record was definitely the hardest that we've ever done. I think I'm partly to blame for that. I checked out on the previous record, so when I came back in, I had to assert myself. Every single thing about that record was a fight. It was not this blissful reconciliation that led to the release; it was a brutal thing right up to the end. We'll see what happens if we end up making another record.

The band split up in 2013. Despite parting, the band never issued a statement about their endings, and fans started to speak about the band in past tense by 2016.

Schlesinger died in 2020, and the surviving band members held an online charity event shortly after, which was the first time the band had played with each other since their 2013 split, to help raise funding for the New Jersey Pandemic Relief Fund.

== Solo ==
Collingwood released his debut album as a solo artist in 2016, under the band name Look Park. The album also included contributions by: Davey Faragher (bass), Mitchell Froom (keyboard/producer), Mike Viola, Flora Reed, and Philip Price (all backing vocals), and was engineered and mixed by David Boucher.

In 2019, Collingwood participated in a tour entitled "Songs & Stories: an evening with Art Alexakis of Everclear, Chris Collingwood of Fountains of Wayne, Max Collins of Eve 6, and John Wozniak of Marcy Playground". Some of the 32 tour dates included Walla Walla, Pasadena, London, Cleveland, and Sioux Falls.

== Influences ==
Collingwood's major influences are The Beatles, The Zombies, The Hollies, Aztec Camera, Squeeze, and Blue Öyster Cult.

== Discography ==
=== With Fountains Of Wayne ===
==== Studio albums ====
Title	Details
Fountains of Wayne	Release date: October 1, 1996; Label: Atlantic; Formats: CD, LP
Utopia Parkway	Release date: April 6, 1999; Label: Atlantic; Formats: CD, LP
Welcome Interstate Managers	Release date: June 10, 2003; Label: S-Curve/Virgin; Formats: CD, music download
Traffic and Weather	Release date: April 3, 2007; Label: S-Curve/Virgin; Formats: CD, music download
Sky Full of Holes	Release date: August 2, 2011; Label: Yep Roc/Lojinx; Formats: CD, LP, music download

==== Singles ====
Title	Year
"Radiation Vibe"	1996
"Sink to the Bottom"	1997
"Survival Car"	1997
"Barbara H."	1997
"I Want an Alien for Christmas"	1997
"Leave the Biker"	1998
"Denise"	1999
"Red Dragon Tattoo"	1999
"Troubled Times"	1999
"The Valley of Malls"	2000
"Stacy's Mom"	2003
"Mexican Wine"	2004
"Hey Julie"	2004
"Maureen"	2005
"Someone to Love"	2007
"'92 Subaru"	2007
"Richie and Ruben"	2011
"Someone's Gonna Break Your Heart"	2011

=== Solo ===
==== Albums ====
Title	Year
Look Park	2016
