= Jody Porter =

American musician (born 1969)

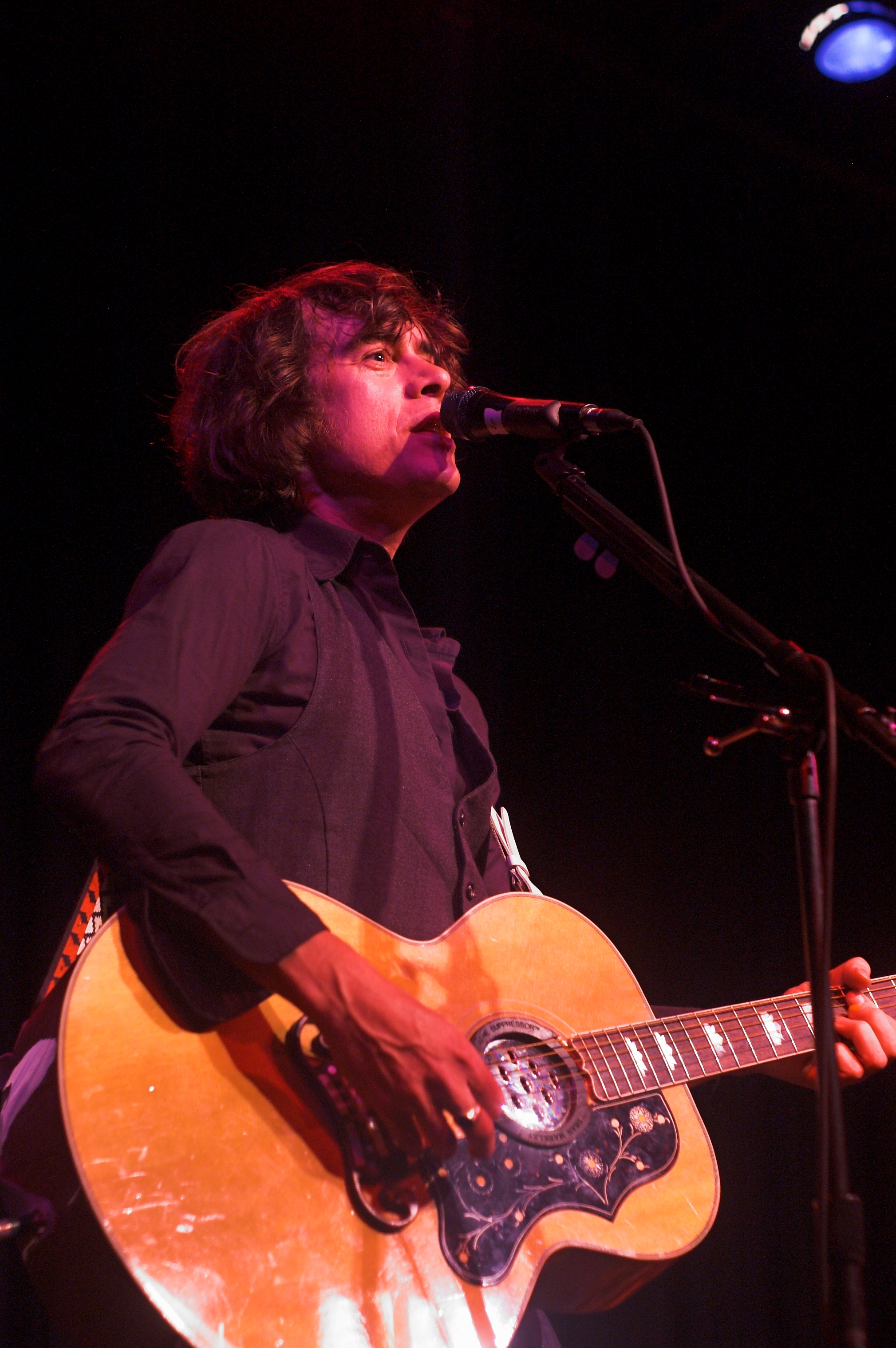
- Porter performing in July 2009

Background information
- Born: May 25, 1969 (age 57)
- Origin: Charleston, South Carolina, U.S.
- Genres: Power pop; rock and roll; psychedelic rock; shoegaze; rock
- Occupations: Musician; songwriter; guitarist; record producer
- Instruments: Guitar; vocals; drums
- Years active: 1990–present
- Labels: Yep Roc, Virgin, Atlantic
- Formerly of: Fountains of Wayne; The Belltower

Jody Porter (born May 25, 1969) is an American musician. He is best known as the lead guitarist of Grammy Award-nominated power pop band Fountains of Wayne. The band released four major label albums, including Welcome Interstate Managers on Virgin Records in 2003. The album spawned the hugely popular U.S. Top 40 hit and number one music video "Stacy's Mom".

He also fronted the band The Belltower in the 1990s, as well as releasing five albums as a solo artist: Close to the Sun (2008), Month of Mondays (2013), Pacifier (2017), Waterways (2022) and Sunflowers, Vol. 1 (2024).

== Career ==
=== Early career ===
As a teenager, Porter fronted the band Foreign Aid, playing in nightclubs in Charleston. He also played in several local bands including a short-lived cover band called The Sound Committee, and The Waltons, performing original music. He later joined The Fields in 1989.

=== The Belltower ===
Known for his impressive virtuoso abilities and British guitar pop playing style, Porter first garnered attention fronting and writing the songs for London-based band The Belltower in the early 1990s, along with Britta Phillips. Although the band created a buzz for itself in the UK, including Melody Maker and NME singles of the week, their singles didn't chart and their major label debut Popdropper sold marginally. The band came back to the US and eventually broke up in 1996.

=== Fountains of Wayne ===
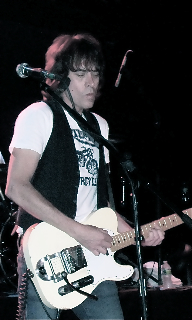
Porter performing in August 2011

Porter was then asked by his friend Adam Schlesinger, who had already been brought into The Belltower briefly, to join his newly formed band Fountains of Wayne shortly after recording their self-titled Atlantic debut. Porter continued with Fountains of Wayne through their 1999 release, Utopia Parkway. However, after the band was dropped from Atlantic Records in 2001, Fountains of Wayne went on hiatus. In 2003, the band reformed and entered the studio to do a spate of demos which would eventually become Welcome Interstate Managers on S-Curve. The band received two Grammy nominations in 2004 and released Out of State Plates, a collection of B-sides and rarities the following year. They reassembled in 2007 for their next studio album Traffic and Weather which was said to have been recorded largely by Schlesinger and Porter. By 2013, the band had broken up without any official statement, though members of the group were speaking of Fountains of Wayne in the past tense. The band performed together for the first time since 2013 on April 22, 2020, as part of a charity livestream event to raise funding for the New Jersey Pandemic Relief Fund. The performance was a tribute to Schlesinger, who died of complications from COVID-19.

Porter is not involved in the most recent revival of Fountains of Wayne, due to health issues.

=== The AstroJet ===
Jody Porter also once fronted the short-lived New York-based alternative band The Astrojet. In 2002, The Astrojet recorded a six track EP of Porter-penned songs entitled, The Mile Low Club. In early 2004, he disbanded the group to reassemble Fountains of Wayne and continue as a solo artist.

=== Guest appearances ===
Porter has played on albums with Albert Hammond Jr., Ivy, Jesse Malin, The Monkees, Brookville, David Mead and Juliana Hatfield.

Porter has been credited on albums playing bass, keyboards and drums in addition to vocals and guitar.

=== Solo ===
In 2008, Porter finished work on his debut solo album, Close to the Sun, produced by himself and co-produced by Michael Tudor and Gordon Raphael (Strokes, Regina Spektor). The 12-song album bridges the gap between the sonic atmospheric stylings of the Belltower and the guitar-driven power pop of Fountains of Wayne. The album was first released in Japan by FAEC/Rough Trade on July 2, 2008, and was later picked up by Engine Room Recordings and slated for worldwide release on May 11, 2010. On writing the album, Porter stated he wrote "from a stream of consciousness [...] I thought I'd be less lyrically inclined to write about things I don't know about. So I pulled from my personal experiences. Seventy-five percent is my point of view and there is some of the stuff that may be about someone I know."

Porter's second solo album, Month of Mondays, was successfully funded via Kickstarter on July 24, 2013. He played drums on the album which was recorded at Treehouse Sound. In November 2016, he released the song "Pick Yer Poison", ahead of the release of his third album Pacifier. Released on February 24, 2017, it was self-produced and features appearances from fellow Fountains of Wayne member Brian Young and touring musician Cobb Ervin, who both played drums on the album. He started writing the album the year prior in Los Angeles, and was recorded in one month at Intrinsic Recording in Stafford, Virginia.

In April 2020, Porter released "Moonbeam Reach" and announced his fourth album Waterways. He spent two years recording the album in his home near Asheville, North Carolina. Another single from the album was released in July, titled "Sunsick Moon". On December 15, 2020, Porter first released his third studio album Waterways onto Bandcamp, before releasing physical copies of the album in September 2021. Finished in early 2020, the album was influenced during his time living in England. While he was living there, he had sparked an interest in psychedelic and shoegaze music.

In May 2021, Porter organized an "all-star memorial tribute" concert for Schlesinger, who died of complications from COVID-19 the year prior. The tribute show featured performances from Micky Dolenz, Courtney Love, Sean Ono Lennon, among many more.

== Musical equipment and playing style ==
Jody has used an arsenal of vintage guitars over the years, most notably a three pick-up Les Paul Custom, several early '60s Fender Jazzmasters, Fender Telecaster various vintage Gretsch models, and more recently a '57 Les Paul Junior that belonged to his father and a new signature guitar. His signature guitar is a SchoolHoused BeachBlaster which consists of a surf green finish and three Seymour Duncan Whole Lotta humbuckers. His guitar amplifiers consists of a '66 Bandmaster, Vox AC30 and Marshall JCM800.

Guitar World described his playing style as "very British," and is renowned for his "unique fretwork."

== Personal life ==
Porter was married to musician and actress Britta Phillips, but the couple later divorced.

== Discography ==
=== Studio albums ===
List of studio albums with selected details
Title	Album details
Close to the Sun	Released: July 2, 2008; Label: FAEC/Rough Trade, Engine Room Recordings; Format: CD, digital download
Month of Mondays	Released: 2013; Format: CD
Pacifier	Released: February 24, 2017; Format: Digital download
Waterways	Released: December 15, 2020; Label: Rare Rock; Format: CD, digital download
Sunflowers, Vol. 1	Released: December 3, 2024; Label: New Departure; Format: Digital download

=== Extended plays ===
List of extended plays with selected details
Title	Album details
EP I	Released: July 22, 2023; Format: Digital download
EP II	Released: February 10, 2024; Label: New Departure Music; Format: Digital download
EP III	Released: April 30, 2024; Label: New Departure Music; Format: Digital download
