= Fountains of Wayne =

American rock band

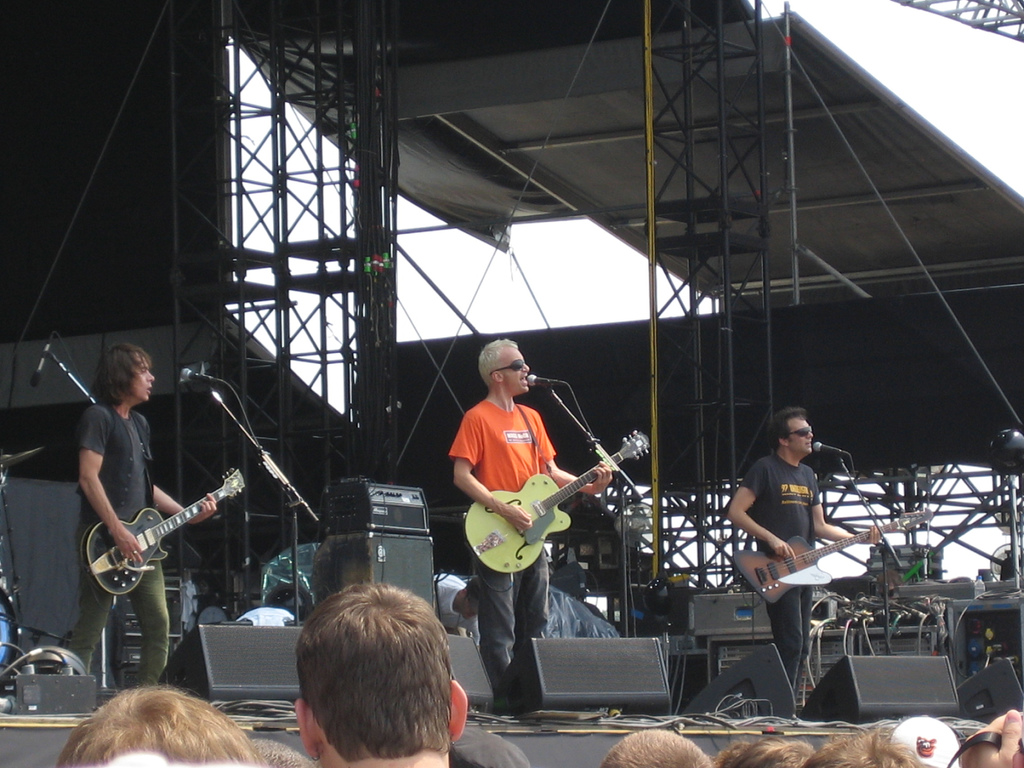
- Fountains of Wayne performing live in 2007

Background information
- Origin: New York City, U.S.
- Genres: Power pop; pop-punk; pop rock; geek rock; alternative rock; indie pop
- Years active: 1995–2013; 2020; 2025–present
- Labels: Atlantic; TAG; S-Curve; Virgin; Yep Roc; Scratchie
- Members: Chris Collingwood; Brian Young
- Past members: Adam Schlesinger; Jody Porter

Fountains of Wayne is an American rock band that formed in New York City in 1995. The band's lineup for the majority of its career was founding members Chris Collingwood and Adam Schlesinger, with Jody Porter and Brian Young who joined after the band's first album. The band, best known for the Grammy-nominated song "Stacy's Mom," released six albums from 1996 to 2011 before effectively disbanding in 2013.

Schlesinger died of complications from COVID-19 on April 1, 2020. The surviving members of Fountains of Wayne played an online benefit concert that month as a tribute to Schlesinger, and reunited again for shows in 2025.

== History ==
=== 1995–2001: Early years ===
After Montclair, New Jersey-based Adam Schlesinger and Sellersville, Pennsylvania-based Chris Collingwood first met as freshmen at Williams College, they played music in various bands and eventually went their separate ways, with Collingwood forming the Mercy Buckets in Boston and Schlesinger forming Ivy in New York City. In the mid-1990s, they came together to form Fountains of Wayne, named after a lawn ornament store in Wayne, New Jersey that closed in 2009. The store features in an episode of The Sopranos, "Another Toothpick". At first Collingwood hated the name but eventually warmed to it. Previous band names included Wallflowers, Woolly Mammoth, Are You My Mother? and Three Men Who When Standing Side by Side Have a Wingspan of Over Twelve Feet. The band cut a demo and signed with Atlantic Records, then recruited guitarist Jody Porter and still-active Posies drummer Brian Young after recording their debut album. Young got in touch with a friend who worked at Fountains of Wayne's label to see if there were any job openings, and when he auditioned for the band, they asked him to play the beat of "Swingtown" by Steve Miller Band.

Though Collingwood and Schlesinger shared cowriter credit for all original Fountains of Wayne material, for most of their career together, they wrote their songs separately. In 2005 Collingwood said, "We decided early on, it's better to not have arguments that some bands have where someone might say, 'I wrote 15% of that song,' and try to figure out those numbers. It just seems ridiculous." Schlesinger added, "We just agreed many years ago that if we were to have a band we'd just split the songwriting to avoid having a conversation every time we tried to finish a song. But we really haven't collaborated as writers in years. And that's kind of intentional too because we didn't want it to turn into a thing where people would say, 'Adam's songs are like this...' We wanted the band to have an identity more than we wanted each of us to have an identity in the band."

In 1996, the band released its self-titled debut, which spawned the singles "Radiation Vibe" and "Sink to the Bottom", and the band toured the world extensively behind its debut album, playing alongside bands including the Smashing Pumpkins, Sloan, and the Lemonheads. That same year, Schlesinger wrote the Academy Award-nominated, RIAA gold-certified title song for the film That Thing You Do!.

In 1999, the band released Utopia Parkway, an album named after a road in Queens, New York. Some critics described it as a loosely thematic album centered on suburban life. Utopia Parkway received generally positive reviews by critics and was album of the week in People magazine. The group once again toured extensively behind the album. Later in 1999, the band was later dropped by Atlantic.

The band was inactive for a period of time. Collingwood, in particular, had a difficult time coping with the band being dropped by their label. In 2004 he said, "When we got dropped from Atlantic, it's my fault that it took so long, because I wasn't sure I wanted to keep doing it. At the end of four years of the hardest work I'd ever done in my life, more traveling and being away from my wife the whole time, I had nothing to show for it. I got back home and I had nothing. I was broke, I was demoralized, I was exhausted. I think I just needed a year to recharge my batteries."

Schlesinger cowrote many of the songs for the Josie and the Pussycats film and soundtrack, produced albums for Verve Pipe, David Mead, and They Might Be Giants, and released a third record with his other band, Ivy. Collingwood formed and fronted a Northampton, Massachusetts-based pop-country band called Gay Potatoes, and played a string of solo shows in the Boston and Los Angeles areas; Gay Potatoes was officially retired on New Year's Eve 2010. Guitarist Jody Porter worked with his band, The Astrojet, alongside famed producer Gordon Raphael in New York City. Percusionist Brian Young moved to Los Angeles and did session work for various artists such as producer Steve Fisk, Ivy, Heather Duby, and Greg Dulli.

=== 2001–2013: Commercial success and breakup ===
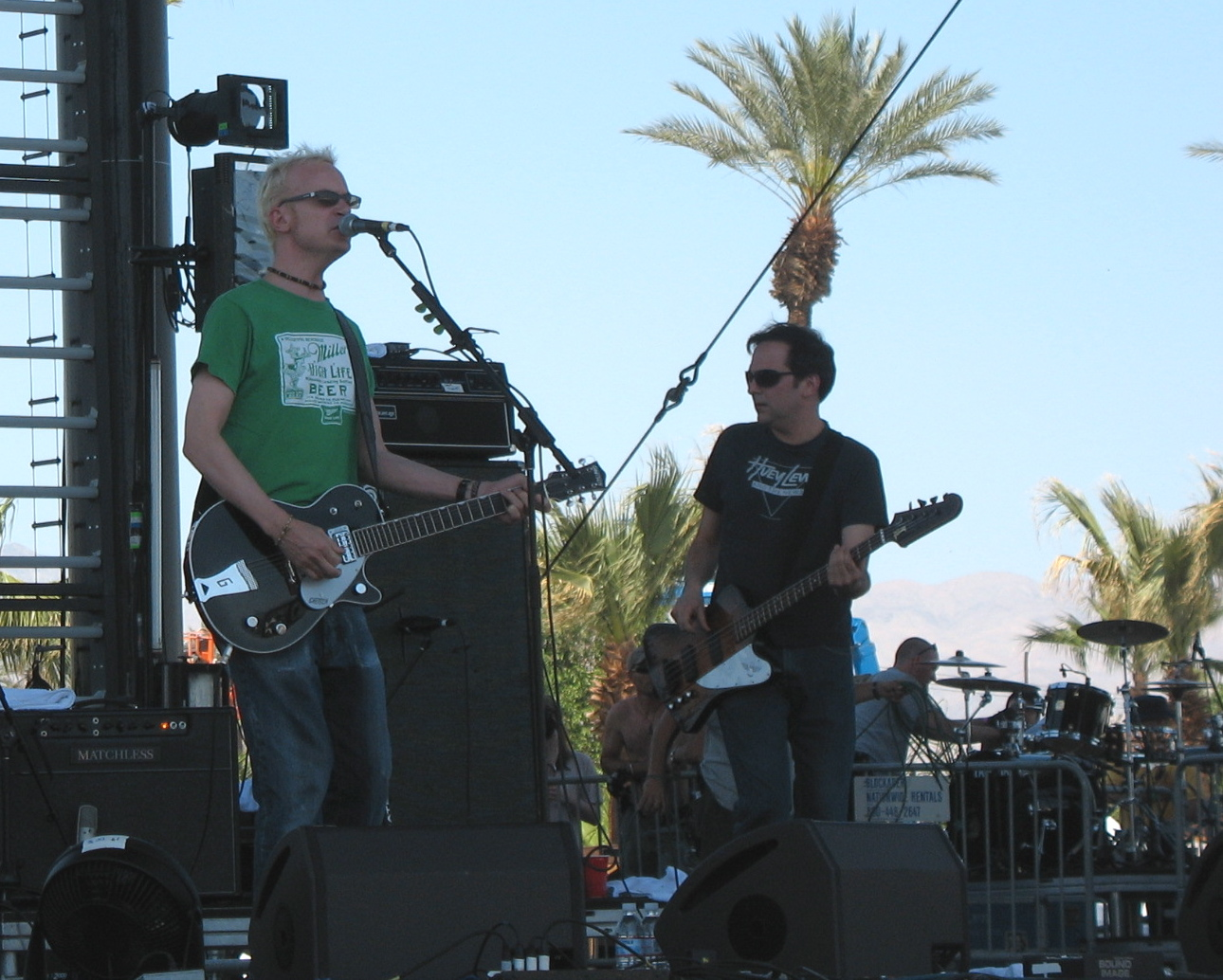
Fountains of Wayne performing in April 2007

The band reunited to record a cover of the Kinks' "Better Things" for the tribute album, This Is Where I Belong: Songs of Ray Davies and the Kinks, in 2001, and began to discuss plans for a new album. In 2003, the band released Welcome Interstate Managers, a successful album that spawned the hit single "Stacy's Mom", which Adam Schlesinger says was a tribute to the Cars. Initially the single stalled at commercial alternative radio in the US, but MTV President Judy McGrath championed the single's music video, a Fast Times at Ridgemont High homage featuring Rachel Hunter. Ultimately, "Stacy's Mom" was certified gold by the Recording Industry Association of America and was nominated for Best Vocal Pop Performance at the 2004 Grammys. Another song off the album, "All Kinds of Time", was used for NFL commercial promotions during the 2005 season.

In 2005, the band released Out-of-State Plates, a collection of B-sides and two new songs. The compilation was supported by the single "Maureen" and a limited US tour that included some acoustic-only sets, a set on PBS Soundstage, and an appearance in the American Songbook concert series at Lincoln Center. Also included on the album is a 1999 cover of the Britney Spears hit, "...Baby One More Time".

Also in 2005, Robbie Fulks released a song in honor of the band called "Fountains of Wayne Hotline".

In 2006, while on tour in Tokyo, Collingwood experienced a mental health crisis that resulted in the cancellation of a scheduled performance. He was hospitalized and later received treatment after returning to the United States.

In 2007, the band released Traffic and Weather, an album which included the song "I-95", which Rolling Stone named No. 54 of the year's top 100 songs. Collingwood had less involvement during the making of the album due to his struggles with depression and alcoholism, only managing to contribute three songs.

In 2008, Porter released his debut solo album Close to the Sun, a collection of songs he had written and recorded over a period of years in between Fountains of Wayne albums and tours.

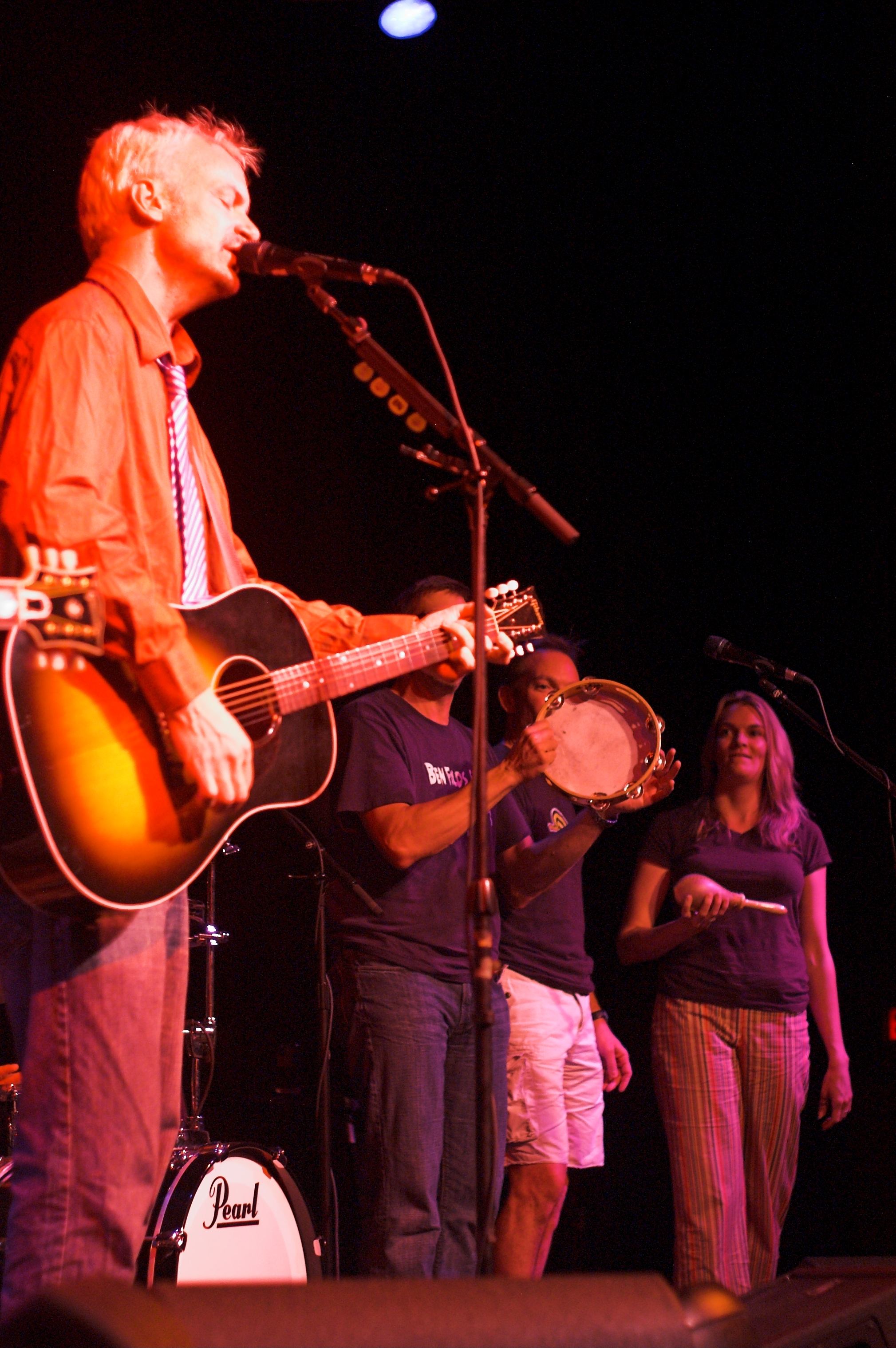
The band playing acoustic in July 2009

In 2009, the band released No Better Place: Live In Chicago, a live concert DVD which included newly recorded acoustic songs. Also that year, they played a short run of full-band acoustic shows where they showcased songs from their forthcoming album.

In 2010, Fountains of Wayne commenced work on their fifth album, which was influenced by the recent acoustic tours they had done. According to Porter, "It's a little bit more introspective and not as loud of a record as the last two. I think that came from the fact that we started last year doing acoustic-based tours because we didn't have a record out. We wanted to get back out on tour and did it stripped-down. Overall it's not as brash or guitar-heavy."

In 2011, the band released Sky Full of Holes, an album put out in Japan by Warner Music Japan (with two bonus tracks), Europe by Lojinx, and the U.S. by Yep Roc Records. The now-sober Collingwood once again became more involved, but this turned out to be the hardest album for them to make. According to Collingwood in 2013, "The most recent record was definitely the hardest that we've ever done. I think I'm partly to blame for that. I checked out on the previous record, so when I came back in, I had to assert myself. Every single thing about that record was a fight. It was not this blissful reconciliation that led to the release; it was a brutal thing right up to the end. We'll see what happens if we end up making another record."

The band toured Sky Full of Holes into 2012. After about a one-year layoff, they played a number of U.S. dates in September and October 2013, on a tour with Soul Asylum and Evan Dando. They also issued one final new track in 2013, "Trucks", written and produced by Sandra Boynton for Boynton's kid-friendly various artists album Frog Trouble. The final Fountains of Wayne show took place in Minneapolis, Minnesota, on October 19, 2013.

=== 2013–2020: Post-breakup ===
The band never issued an official announcement that they had broken up. However, by 2016, all the members were speaking of Fountains of Wayne in the past tense. Neither Schlesinger nor Collingwood had ruled out a future reunion, but both saw the possibility as remote. "I try never to say never," Collingwood said, "but it's staggering to think of everything that would have to happen for me to want to repeat that experience."

In 2016, Collingwood released what was essentially a solo album that was issued under the group name Look Park. At the time of the album release, he elaborated on Fountains of Wayne's demise by saying, "When we were recording the record before the last Fountains of Wayne record, which was called Traffic and Weather, I didn't really have a whole lot to contribute to that album. I was out to lunch a little bit, mentally, and just drinking too much. And I think that the fact that I sort of removed myself from the process at that point made it really easier for Adam to take over. And when I was ready to actually make another album, you know, several years later after I'd sort of cleaned up my act, it was very difficult. It was very, very hard to get back into the position where we were equals."

Porter and Young joined Schlesinger in 2016 on the Monkees' album Good Times! and again in 2018 on the group's Christmas Party. Schlesinger produced and wrote songs for both albums.

Schlesinger and Collingwood, meanwhile, remained distant. "I don't even know where Adam lives now," Collingwood told an interviewer in 2019.

=== 2020-present: Death of Schlesinger and reunions ===
Adam Schlesinger died of complications from COVID-19 on April 1, 2020.

The surviving members of Fountains of Wayne performed together for the first time since 2013 on April 22, 2020, as part of a charity livestream event to raise funding for the New Jersey Pandemic Relief Fund. The performance was a tribute to Schlesinger, and featured Sharon Van Etten taking his place on bass guitar.

On February 12, 2025, multiple posts from official band social media announced Fountains of Wayne's appearance at Milwaukee's Summerfest on July 4, 2025. Max Collins of the band Eve 6 was announced as the bassist for this show. Adam Schlesinger's family gave their blessings for the reunion, with Steven M. Gold - the band's longtime touring keyboardist as well as Schlesinger's producing and songwriting partner - also participating.

On May 23, Joe Guese of The Click Five revealed on Instagram that he would be filling in for Jody Porter on guitar for Fountains of Wayne's summer shows. The band played their first reunion show on May 24 in Boca Raton, Florida, in which they performed songs from the first three albums.

== Musical style and legacy ==
Fountains of Wayne's musical style has been described as power pop, pop-punk, pop rock, geek rock, alternative rock, and indie pop. Andrew Leahey of AllMusic called Fountains of Wayne "one of America's strongest power pop acts" and described their sound as "a mix of British-influenced pop songs, lo-fi production, and wry lyrics about dead-end jobs and biker boyfriends." In 2025, Jeff Mezydlo of Yardbarker included the band in his list of "20 underrated bands from the 1990s who are worth rediscovering".

== Band members ==
Current

- Chris Collingwood – lead vocals (1995–2013, 2020, 2025–present); rhythm guitar (1997–2013, 2020, 2025–present); keyboards (1995–1999, 2011–2013); lead guitar (1995–1997)
- Brian Young – drums, percussion (1997–2013, 2020, 2025–present)

Former

- Adam Schlesinger – bass (1997-2013); keyboards, backing and occasional lead vocals, rhythm guitar (1995–2013); drums (1995–1997); died 2020
- Jody Porter – lead guitar, backing vocals (1997–2013, 2020)

Touring

- Steven M. Gold – keyboards, backing vocals (2003-2013, 2025-present)
- Max Collins – bass, backing vocals (2025–present)
- Joe Guese – lead guitar (2025–present)

== Discography ==
Studio albums

- Fountains of Wayne (1996)
- Utopia Parkway (1999)
- Welcome Interstate Managers (2003)
- Traffic and Weather (2007)
- Sky Full of Holes (2011)
