= Stacy's Mom =

2003 single by Fountains of Wayne

Single by Fountains of Wayne

from the album Welcome Interstate Managers
- B-side: "Trains and Boats and Planes"
- Released: May 19, 2003
- Studio: Stratosphere Sound (New York City); Q Division (Somerville, Massachusetts); Clubhouse Recording (Rhinebeck, New York)
- Genre: Power pop; pop-punk; new wave
- Length: 3:19
- Label: S-Curve; Virgin
- Songwriters: Adam Schlesinger; Chris Collingwood
- Producers: Adam Schlesinger; Chris Collingwood; Mike Denneen

Fountains of Wayne singles chronology
"The Valley of Malls" (2000)	"Stacy's Mom" (2003)	"Mexican Wine" (2003)

Music video
- "Stacy's Mom" on YouTube

"Stacy's Mom" is a song by American rock band Fountains of Wayne. It is the third track on their third studio album, Welcome Interstate Managers, and was released to radio as the album's first single on May 19, 2003, through S-Curve Records and Virgin Records. "Stacy's Mom" was written by bassist Adam Schlesinger and vocalist Chris Collingwood, both of whom produced the song alongside Mike Denneen. Its subject matter was inspired by a friend of Schlesinger's when he was young who was attracted to Schlesinger's grandmother. It is a power pop song with which the group hoped to emulate the sound of American rock band the Cars.

"Stacy's Mom" reached number 21 on the US Billboard Hot 100, becoming the band's highest-charting hit in the United States. Additionally, the song peaked within the top 10 in Ireland and the top 20 in the United Kingdom, Australia, and Canada. The single was certified gold by the Recording Industry Association of America for sales of over 500,000 copies, and it was nominated for a Grammy Award for Best Pop Performance by a Duo or Group With Vocals at the 46th Annual Grammy Awards. The song was accompanied with a music video in which model Rachel Hunter plays the title role. "Stacy's Mom" was the only mainstream hit by Fountains of Wayne.

== Background and composition ==
Authorship of "Stacy's Mom" is credited to Chris Collingwood and Adam Schlesinger; in practice, the two songwriters wrote independently, and agreed to credit both writers on all Fountains of Wayne songs regardless of the actual author. In interviews, Schlesinger took responsibility for the song.

In a 2020 interview with Rolling Stone shortly after Schlesinger's death, Collingwood recalled that he was reluctant to record "Stacy's Mom", although he "Knew it would be a single, and I knew it would be a hit, and everyone else knew it too." Collingwood said that he was concerned that recording what he described as a "novelty song" would overshadow Schlesinger's talent as a songwriter. He said, "I tried to talk [Schlesinger] out of 'Stacy’s Mom'. I could see exactly what was going to happen, and when it started happening in slow motion it just felt inevitable. He was too good a writer to have that be his calling card, and the success of a novelty song means that's just what you are to the public, from that moment on forever."

"Stacy's Mom" is a power pop, pop-punk, and new wave song. Part of the song's inspiration was a friend with whom Schlesinger had grown up who thought Schlesinger's grandmother was attractive. "One of my best friends, when we were maybe 11 or 12, came to me and announced that he thought my grandmother was hot. And I said, 'Hey, you're stepping over the line,' but at that point in life, I wouldn't put it past anyone," he recalled. He hoped to strike a balance "between humor and personality" with the song. In writing the song, he was hoping to take influence from new wave and power pop music: "I was thinking a little bit about 'Mrs. Robinson' and sonically I was thinking about the Cars, a Rick Springfield sort of thing." He acknowledged that stylistically, the song "owes a debt" to the Cars' "Just What I Needed"; its opening guitar riff is similar. Cars frontman Ric Ocasek thought that the intro was a sample from "Just What I Needed" but the band says they performed it in the studio and just "got it right."

== Chart performance ==
"Stacy's Mom" debuted on the Billboard Hot 100 the week of October 11, 2003, at number 59, making this their first song to appear on that chart. It entered the top 40 the week after by moving 21 spots to number 38 and moved seven spots to number 31 on the week of October 25, 2003. It peaked at number 21 the week of November 21, 2003, and stayed there for two weeks. It stayed on the chart for 17 weeks.

It was one of the first songs to reach the No. 1 spot on the "Most Downloaded Songs" list of the iTunes Music Store. It reached No. 11 in the UK Singles Chart. It was nominated for a Grammy Award for Best Pop Performance by a Duo or Group with Vocals at the 46th Annual Grammy Awards. The single's sales were last estimated at 888,000, according to Nielsen SoundScan, in 2011.

== Reception ==
Richard Harrington of The Washington Post dubbed it "nicely naughty." Ben Greenman, writing for The New Yorker, considered it the "second-catchiest song ever written about a girlfriend's parent," after "Mrs. Robinson". The song ranks No. 350 on Blender's "500 Greatest Songs Since You Were Born" and No. 88 on VH1's "100 Greatest Songs of the '00s".

== Music video ==
The music video, directed by Chris Applebaum, features several comedic scenes illustrating the boy's attempts to get closer to Stacy's mother (Rachel Hunter). The video's premise is around Stacy (Gianna Distenca), whose best friend and love interest (Shane Haboucha) is attracted to her mother, mentioning times she caught his attention. First, by the pool (where Stacy is shown wearing red, heart-shaped sunglasses as a reference to the poster of the 1962 film Lolita), and later, receiving a massage on the lawn and during an imaginary strip tease in the dining room. It features several sexual innuendos such as wet dreams and adolescent gratification. By the end of the video, Stacy walks in on her unnamed friend in the bathroom as he watches her mother wearing a red bikini in the backyard pool (a direct reference to Fast Times at Ridgemont High). It closes on the door with an "Ocupado" sign hanging from the doorknob and Stacy laughing.

"We looked at a lot of treatments and some directors were trying to be kind of arty and subtle with it, but Chris Applebaum went completely for the jugular," said Schlesinger. Model Rachel Hunter plays the title role, which she accepted because she was a fan of the band and the song. The group had previously hoped to get Paulina Porizkova (Ocasek's then-wife) for the role. The clip was shot in Los Angeles in late May 2003. "It was 7 a.m., and there was Rachel Hunter doing a striptease on the kitchen counter," remembered Schlesinger. The video was first sent to television in July 2003.

Fountains of Wayne had asked Ocasek to be in the video for the song. Schlesinger explains that while Ocasek claimed that he "politely declined", he actually just never responded to the request. There are several references to the Cars in the video: a license plate reads "I ♥ RIC", a reference to Ocasek; one of the boys in the opening scene has dark hair, sunglasses, and clothes such that he looks like an adolescent version of Ocasek; the trademark Elliot Easton "bouncing" (at approximately 1:15 into the video) and hairdo as he plays his guitar for the Cars; and the re-creation of a scene from the movie Fast Times at Ridgemont High, which featured the Cars' "Moving in Stereo". Further links to the Cars and new wave music are given by the magazine Nu Wave that is featured in the video, the Roland Juno-6 keyboard (a synthesizer of the 1980s), and the record sleeve showing 'Stacy's Mom' in a car. The video reached No. 1 on VH1's VSpot Top 20 Countdown.

== Track listings ==
Australian and European CD single

1. "Stacy's Mom" – 3:16
2. "Elevator Up" – 4:02
3. "Trains and Boats and Planes" – 3:02

UK CD1 and 7-inch single

1. "Stacy's Mom" – 3:16
2. "Trains and Boats and Planes" – 3:02

UK CD2

1. "Stacy's Mom" – 3:16
2. "Trains and Boats and Planes" – 3:02
3. "Elevator Up" – 4:02
4. "Stacy's Mom" (video) – 3:16

== Charts ==
=== Weekly charts ===
Chart (2003–2004)	Peak position
Australia (ARIA)	14
Canada (Nielsen SoundScan)	13
Canada CHR (Nielsen BDS)	12
Ireland (IRMA)	9
Netherlands (Single Top 100)	99
New Zealand (Recorded Music NZ)	35
Scottish Singles Sales (Official Charts)	6
UK Singles (Official Charts)	11
US Billboard Hot 100	21
US Adult Pop Airplay (Billboard)	20
US Alternative Airplay (Billboard)	31
US Pop Airplay (Billboard)	3

Chart (2020)	Peak position
US Hot Rock & Alternative Songs (Billboard)	12

=== Year-end charts ===
Chart (2003)	Position
US Adult Top 40 (Billboard)	55
US Mainstream Top 40 (Billboard)	74

Chart (2004)	Position
UK Singles (OCC)	121
US Adult Top 40 (Billboard)	88
US Mainstream Top 40 (Billboard)	94

== Certifications ==
Region	Certification	Certified units/sales
Australia (ARIA)	Gold	35,000^{^}
New Zealand (RMNZ)	2× Platinum	60,000^{‡}
United Kingdom (BPI)	2× Platinum	1,200,000^{‡}
United States (RIAA)	Gold	500,000^{^}
^{^} Shipments figures based on certification alone.^{‡} Sales+streaming figures based on certification alone.

== Release history ==
Region	Date	Format(s)	Label(s)	Ref(s).
United States	May 19, 2003	Triple A; alternative radio	S-Curve; Virgin	
United Kingdom	October 7, 2003	Digital download	S-Curve; Virgin	
Australia	October 13, 2003	CD	S-Curve; Virgin	
United Kingdom	March 8, 2004	7-inch single; CD	S-Curve; Virgin	

== Bowling for Soup cover ==
"Stacy's Mom"

Song by Bowling for Soup

from the EP I've Never Done Anything Like This
- Released: October 10, 2011
- Genre: Pop-punk
- Length: 3:13
- Label: Que-so; Brando
- Songwriters: Adam Schlesinger; Chris Collingwood
- Producer: Jarinus

In 2011, pop punk band Bowling for Soup released a cover version of "Stacy's Mom" as a B-side to their single "I've Never Done Anything Like This" (featuring Kay Hanley).

The cover version came about because the original Fountains of Wayne song was often misattributed to Bowling for Soup. The song was misidentified as a Bowling for Soup song on YouTube and other video sites. In multiple interviews, Bowling for Soup bandleader Jaret Reddick has said that he regularly encountered fans at their concerts who mistakenly thought "Stacy's Mom" was a Bowling for Soup song. In 2011, they recorded and released a cover version of the song. Reddick said that by finally releasing their own version of the song, "I’ve basically just taken care of a large part of the population that's been wrong for years, and I've made them right." Alluding to the mistaken identity issue, the cover art for the song release reads: "Everyone thought they did it anyway ... so they freakin did it! Finally you can say this is your favorite song by BFS and not look like an idiot!"

Bowling for Soup has since made the song part of their live setlist.

== In popular culture ==
The song was included on the setlist for Guitar Hero: Van Halen as a guest act, and was included as DLC for Rock Band 4. It also appeared in the 4th episode of season 1 of the television series Psych, "Woman Seeking Dead Husband: Smokers Okay, No Pets" in 2006. The song was parodied on The Howard Stern Show to mock Wack Pack character Hanzi (Imran Kahn). It has also been performed by Postmodern Jukebox ft. Casey Abrams. It has appeared in Me Him Her (2015) and Art School Confidential (2006).

A cover of the song by the Northeastern University pep band has become an unofficial theme song for the Northeastern Huskies men's and women's ice hockey teams, and has frequent performances at the annual Beanpot. At each game, the pep band plays the song during a stoppage of play with the fan sections continuing to sing through the chorus without accompaniment once gameplay begins again.

In 2021, heavy metal band Ice Nine Kills released a parody titled "Jason's Mom" about Pamela Voorhees from the Friday the 13th franchise.

Washington, D.C. indie-pop band Sub-Radio released a parody titled "Stacy's Dad" on TikTok in 2022 that recorded 10.2 million views before the end of that year.

In 2024, Boston, Massachusetts pop-punk band Walk On Mars released a parody of their own titled “Stacy’s Side” that reiterated the storyline from the original song, but from Stacy’s perspective.
