= List of power pop artists and songs =

Power pop is a music genre which is a more aggressive form of pop rock. Although its mainstream success peaked in the late 1970s and early 1980s, the genre continues to influence new artists.

The following list is divided in two sections. The first section includes notable power pop bands and solo artists, while the second section includes power pop songs by power pop artists, as well as power pop songs by artists whose main music genre is not power pop. Solo artists are listed alphabetically by last name, and groups are listed alphabetically by the first letter (not including the article "the").

Contents
Artists: 0–9 A B C D E F G H I J K L M N O P Q R S T U V W X Y Z
Songs

== See also ==
- List of power pop albums
- Lists of musicians
- Lists of songs

== Notes ==
- ≈ indicate a Rock and Roll Hall of Fame inductee either as a band and/or individual solo artist

== Artists ==
=== 0–9 ===
- 5 Seconds of Summer
- 20/20
- The 88

=== A ===
- The Academy Is...
- Admiral Twin
- Andrew W.K.
- Artist vs. Poet
- Ash
- Jon Auer

=== B ===
- Badfinger
- The Bangles
- Bloc Party
- The Barracudas
- Stiv Bators
- Bay City Rollers
- The Beat
- Beathoven
- Chris Bell
- Ben Folds Five
- Brendan Benson
- The Beths
- Big Star
- Bleu
- Blink-182
- ≈Blondie
- Blue Ash
- The Bongos
- Boston
- The Boys
- The Breakaways
- Busted

=== C ===
- Candy (band)
- ≈The Cars
- Cavedogs
- Cheap Girls
- ≈Cheap Trick
- Alex Chilton
- The Click Five
- Paul Collins
- Cotton Mather
- Marshall Crenshaw
- The Cretones
- Mikal Cronin

=== D ===
- The Dandy Warhols
- The dB's
- Dirty Looks
- Donnie Iris and the Cruisers
- Doughboys
- Dwight Twilley Band

=== E ===
- Earth Quake
- Dave Edmunds
- Enuff Z'Nuff
- The Exploding Hearts

=== F ===
- Fall Out Boy
- Chris Farren
- The Feeling
- Flamin' Groovies
- Flop
- Fotomaker
- Fountains of Wayne
- The Furys
- Fuzzbubble

=== G ===
- Game Theory
- Gigolo Aunts
- Gin Blossoms
- ≈The Go-Go's
- Good Charlotte
- Nina Gordon
- Great Buildings
- Green
- The Greenberry Woods

=== H ===
- Pete Ham
- Hawks
- Head Automatica
- Hellogoodbye
- Hoodoo Gurus
- Hudson Brothers

=== I ===
- I Fight Dragons
- Ima Robot
- The Individuals
- The Innocents
- Donnie Iris

=== J ===
- The Jags
- The Jam
- Jellyfish
- Jimmy Eat World
- Jonas Brothers

=== K ===
- Kaiser Chiefs
- Katrina and the Waves
- Tommy Keene
- Greg Kihn
- The Knack

=== L ===
- L.E.O.
- The Last
- Avril Lavigne
- Let's Active
- Lost Patrol
- The Loud Family
- Demi Lovato
- Nick Lowe
- Luxury

=== M ===
- Chris Mars
- Material Issue
- Maxïmo Park
- The Mayflies USA
- McFly
- The Merrymakers
- The Mice
- Milk 'N' Cookies
- Morningwood
- Motion City Soundtrack
- Bob Mould
- Myracle Brah

=== N ===
- Nazz
- The Nerves
- The New Pornographers
- Nikki & the Corvettes

=== O ===
- Off Broadway
- OK Go
- Old 97's
- One Direction
- The Only Ones
- The Outfield

=== P ===
- Paramore
- The Paley Brothers
- Peachcake
- Pezband
- Phantom Planet
- The Plimsouls
- The Posies
- Puffy AmiYumi
- Punchbuggy
- The Pursuit of Happiness

=== Q ===
- The Quick

=== R ===
- The Raspberries
- The Replacements
- The Records
- Redd Kross
- Emitt Rhodes
- Ridel High
- Robin Lane & the Chartbusters
- Rockpile
- The Romantics
- Rooney
- The Rubinoos
- ≈Todd Rundgren

=== S ===
- Adam Schmitt
- The Scruffs
- The Semantics
- Sex Clark Five
- Phil Seymour
- The Shins
- Shoes
- The Sidewinders
- Silver Sun
- Simple Plan
- Sloan
- Smash Mouth
- The Smithereens
- The Sneetches
- The Someloves
- The Speedies
- The Spongetones
- Rick Springfield
- Squeeze
- Chris Stamey
- The Starjets
- Starz
- Stereo Skyline
- Stiv Bators
- Stretch Princess
- Sugar
- The Summer Set
- Sunnyboys
- Superdrag
- Matthew Sweet

=== T ===
- ≈Tom Petty and the Heartbreakers
- Teenage Fanclub
- Tinted Windows
- Tommy Keene
- Tommy Tutone
- The Tourists
- Tsar
- Dwight Twilley
- Two Hours Traffic

=== U ===
- Universal Honey
- Utopia

=== V ===
- Valley Lodge
- The Vapors
- Velvet Crush
- Kyle Vincent
- Mike Viola
- Chris Von Sneidern
- The Voodoo Jets

=== W ===
- Wallows
- Wilco
- Waterparks
- Weezer
- The Wellingtons
- White Reaper
- ≈The Who
- The Windbreakers
- The Wondermints

=== X ===
- XTC

=== Y ===
- Yachts

=== Z ===
- Zumpano

== Songs ==
Artist	Song(s)
20/20	"Yellow Pills"
Ash	"Burn Baby Burn" • "Does Your Mother Know" • "Insects" • "Kung Fu" • "Shining Light"
Jon Auer	"The Perfect Size"
Tal Bachman	"She's So High"
Badfinger	"Baby Blue" • "Day After Day" • "Know One Knows" • "No Matter What"
The Bangles	"Bell Jar" • "Crash and Burn" • "Hero Takes a Fall" • "In Your Room" • "Mesmerized" • "Silent Treatment"
Stiv Bators	"A Million Miles Away"
Bay City Rollers	"Wouldn't You Like It?"
The Beat	"The Kids Are the Same"
The Beatles	"Paperback Writer"
Beathoven	"Sooner or Later"
Big Star	"Back of a Car" • "Feel" • "In the Street" • "Jesus Christ" • "Kanga Roo" • "September Gurls"
Blink-182	"All the Small Things" • "MH 4.18.2011" • "Feeling This"
Blondie	"D-Day" • "Dreaming" • "Hanging on the Telephone" • "Maria" • "One Way or Another" • "Sunday Girl" • "X Offender"
Blue Ash	"Any Time at All" • "Dusty Old Fairgrounds"
David Bowie	"(You Will) Set the World on Fire"
The Boys	"You Make Me Shake"
The Breetles	"Warm Dove Plains"
V V Brown	"Crying Blood"
Busted	"Crashed the Wedding" • "What I Go to School For" • "Year 3000"
Belinda Carlisle	"Heaven Is a Place on Earth" • "Leave a Light On"
The Cars	"Just What I Needed" • "My Best Friend's Girl"
Cheap Girls	"Ruby"
Cheap Trick	"Alive" • "California Girl" • "Come On, Come On" • "Dream Police" • "I Can't Take It" • "I Want You to Want Me" • "Miss Tomorrow" • "Southern Girls" • "Surrender" • "You're All I Wanna Do"
Kelly Clarkson	"Since U Been Gone"
The Click Five	"Just the Girl" • "Catch Your Wave" • "Jenny"
Paul Collins	"C'mon Let's Go" • "Doin' It for the Ladies" • "Don't Blame Your Troubles on Me"
Marshall Crenshaw	"Cynical Girl" • "Someday, Someway" • There She Goes Again
The Dandy Warhols	"Bohemian Like You" • "Cool Scene" • "Get Off" • "Horse Pills" • "I Am Free" • "Seti vs. the Wow! Signal"
The dB's	"I'm in Love"
Doughboys	"Sorry Wrong Number" • "Sunflower Honey" • "Wait and See"
Dwight Twilley Band	"I'm on Fire" "Looking for the Magic"
Dave Edmunds	"Crawling from the Wreckage" • "Girls Talk"
Eddie and the Hot Rods	"Do Anything You Wanna Do"
Enuff Z'Nuff	"Catholic Girls" • "Hollywood Squares" • "I'll B the 1 2 Luv U" • "Let It Go" • "Marie" • "New Thing"
The Exploding Hearts	"Busy Signals" • "Modern Kicks" • "Shattered (You Left Me)"
The Feeling	"Love It When You Call"
Flamin' Groovies	"I Can't Hide" • "Shake Some Action" • "Slow Death" • "Yes, It's True" • "You Tore Me Down"
Foo Fighters	"Big Me" • "This Is A Call"
Fountains of Wayne	"Bought for a Song" • "Bright Future in Sales" • "Little Red Light" • "Mexican Wine" • "Someone's Gonna Break Your Heart" • "Stacy's Mom" • "The Summer Place"
Fuzzbubble	"Sellout"
Game Theory	"Shark Pretty"
The Go-Go's	"Can't Stop The World" • "Our Lips Are Sealed" • "Skidmarks on My Heart" • "We Got the Beat"
Good Charlotte	"The Anthem" • "Lifestyles of the Rich and Famous" • "Girls & Boys" • "Little Things"
The Greenberry Woods	"Nervous"
The Greg Kihn Band	"The Breakup Song (They Don't Write 'Em)" • "Can't Stop Hurtin' Myself" • "Jeopardy"
Head Automatica	"Curious"
Hoodoo Gurus	"Bittersweet" • "Come Anytime" • "I Want You Back"
Hudson Brothers	"Spinning the Wheel"
The Jam	"Boy About Town" • "In the City"
The Jayhawks	"Big Star"
Jellyfish	"The King Is Half-Undressed"
Jimmy Eat World	"The Authority Song" • "Clarity" • "Crush" • "The Middle" • "Movielike"
Jonas Brothers	"BB Good" • "Burnin' Up" • "Hold On" • "Paranoid" • "Play My Music" • "Poison Ivy" • "Pushin' Me Away" • "S.O.S" • "That's Just the Way we Roll"
Kaiser Chiefs	"Everything Is Average Nowadays" • "I Predict a Riot" • "Problem Solved" • "Ruby"
Tommy Keene	"Back Again (Try)" • "Safe in the Light"
The Knack	"Good Girls Don't" • "My Sharona"
Avril Lavigne	"Complicated" • "Mobile" • "My World" • "Things I'll Never Say" • "Nobody's Fool" • "Girlfriend" • "My Happy Ending" • "Sk8er Boi" • "Dumb Blonde" • "Hot"
Let's Active	"Every Word Means No"
The Loud Family	"Pop Song 99"
Demi Lovato	"Here We Go Again" • "Remember December" • "So Far, So Great" • "Solo"
Nick Lowe	"Cruel to Be Kind" • "I Love the Sound of Breaking Glass" • "Nutted by Reality" • "So It Goes"
Material Issue	"Valerie Loves Me"
Maxïmo Park	"Girls Who Play Guitars"
The Motors	"Airport" • "Forget About You"
Bob Mould	"The Descent"
Myracle Brah	"I'd Rather Be"
Nazz	"Forget All About It" • "Not Wrong Long" • "Open My Eyes"
The Nerves	"Hanging on the Telephone" • "Paper Dolls" • "Walking Out On Love"
The New Pornographers	"All the Old Showstoppers" • "Chump Change" • "Crash Years" • "Sing Me Spanish Techno"
New Radicals	"You Get What You Give"
Off Broadway	"Eddie's Pals"
OK Go	"All Is Not Lost" • "Get Over It" • "Here It Goes Again"
Old 97's	"Can't Get a Line"
One Direction	"Back for You" • "Best Song Ever" • "Diana" • "Kiss You" • "Little Black Dress" • "What Makes You Beautiful"
The Only Ones	"Another Girl, Another Planet" • "You've Got To Pay"
The Outfield	"61 Seconds" • "All The Love" • "I Don't Need Her" • "Mystery Man" • "Say It Isn't So" • "Taking My Chances" • "Talk To Me" • "Your Love"
Paramore	"Crushcrushcrush" • "That's What You Get" • "Still Into You" • "Grow Up" • "Daydreaming" • "Fake Happy"
Katy Perry	"One of the Boys" • "Roar"
Pezband	"Baby It's Cold Outside" • "Stop! Wait a Minute"
Phantom Planet	"California" • "Do the Panic" • "Dropped" • "Geronimo" • "Leave Yourself for Somebody Else" • "Ship Lost at Sea"
Pink	"Sober"
The Plimsouls	"A Million Miles Away" • "Hush, Hush" • "Oldest Story in the World" • "Zero Hour"
The Posies	"Golden Blunders" • "My Big Mouth"
Puffy AmiYumi	"Sayonara" • "Shut Your Mouth, Honey" • "The Story"
The Raspberries	"Go All the Way" • "I Wanna Be with You" • "Overnight Sensation (Hit Record)" • "Tonight"
The Records	"Hearts in Her Eyes" • "Starry Eyes" • "Teenarama"
R.E.M.	"Pop Song 89"
Rockpile	"Heart"
The Romantics	"Tell It to Carrie" • "What I Like About You"
Rooney	"Blueside"
The Rubinoos	"I Wanna Be Your Boyfriend" • "Thorn in My Side"
Todd Rundgren	"Couldn't I Just Tell You" • "Tin Soldier"
Adam Schmitt	"Can't Get You On My Mind" • "Scarlett Street"
Phil Seymour	"Baby It's You"
Shoes	"Like I Told You" • "Tomorrow Night" • "Too Late"
Simple Plan	"I'm Just a Kid" • "Welcome to My Life" • "Everywhere" • "Me Against the World • "Loser of the Year" • "Jet Lag"
Smash Mouth	"Walkin' on the Sun" • "All Star" • "I'm a Believer" • "Can't Get Enough of You Baby" • "Then the Morning Comes" • "Waste"
The Sound	"Total Recall"
The Speedies	"Undeclared Major"
The Spongetones	"Here I Go Again" • "Love Song to Mrs. Parker" • "She Goes Out With Everybody"
Rick Springfield	"The American Girl" • "Calling All Girls" • "Don't Talk to Strangers" • "How Do You Talk to Girls" • "Jessie's Girl" • "What Kind of Fool Am I" • "What's Victoria's Secret?"
Bruce Springsteen	"Born to Run" • "Hungry Heart" • "Loose Ends" • "Mary Lou" • "Where The Bands Are"
Squeeze	"Pulling Mussels (from the Shell)" • "Third Rail"
Billy Squier	"Who's Your Boyfriend"
The Starjets	"It Doesn't Really Matter" • "Run With the Pack"
Starz	"(Any Way That You Want It) I'll Be There" • "Cherry Baby" • "Hold on to the Night" • "She"
Bram Tchaikovsky	"Girl of My Dreams" • "I'm a Believer"
Taylor Swift	"You Belong with Me"
Tom Petty and the Heartbreakers	"American Girl"
Tommy Tutone	"867-5309/Jenny"
Dwight Twilley	"Betsy Sue" • "Girls" • "Nothing's Ever Gonna Change So Fast" • "Runaway"
The Vapors	"Turning Japanese"
Velvet Crush	"Ride the Lightning"
Weezer	"(If You're Wondering If I Want You To) I Want You To" • "Beverly Hills" • "Buddy Holly" • "Dope Nose" • "I'm Your Daddy" • "Pork and Beans" • "Put Me Back Together" • "Run Away"
The Wellingtons	"The Nice One" • "Singer in a Cover Band" • "Top 10 List"
The Who	"Anyway, Anyhow, Anywhere" • "I Can See for Miles" • "I Can't Explain" • "The Kids Are Alright" • "My Generation" • "Pictures of Lily" • "The Seeker" • "So Sad About Us" • "Substitute"
The Wondermints	"Carnival of Souls" • "Ride"
XTC	"Are You Receiving Me?" • "Earn Enough for Us" • "Statue of Liberty" • "This Is Pop?"
Robin Zander	"I've Always Got You" • "Reactionary Girl"
