= List of power pop albums =

The following is a list of power pop albums by notable artists that have been described as such by music reviews, or any similar source. They are listed chronologically, with the older ones at the top of the list.

Contents
- 1970s
- 1980s
- 1990s
- 2000s
- 2010s

== 1970s ==
Year	Artist	Album
1970	Badfinger	No Dice
1970	Emitt Rhodes	Emitt Rhodes
1971	Badfinger	Straight Up
1972	Big Star	#1 Record
1973	Blue Ash	No More, No Less
1974	Big Star	Radio City
1974	Raspberries	Starting Over
1976	Dwight Twilley Band	Sincerely
1976	Flamin' Groovies	Shake Some Action
1977	Cheap Trick	Cheap Trick
1977	Cheap Trick	In Color
1977	Dwight Twilley Band	Twilley Don't Mind
1978	Big Star	Third/Sister Lovers
1978	The Cars	The Cars
1978	Cheap Trick	Heaven Tonight
1978	Greg Kihn	Next of Kihn
1978	Starz	Attention Shoppers!
1979	20/20	20/20
1979	The Beat	The Beat
1979	The Knack	Get the Knack

== 1980s ==
Year	Artist	Album
1980	Stiv Bators	Disconnected
1980	Dirty Looks	Dirty Looks
1980	The Jags	Evening Standards
1980	The Romantics	The Romantics
1980	Phil Seymour	Phil Seymour
1981	The dB's	Stands for Decibels
1981	Rick Springfield	Working Class Dog
1982	Donnie Iris and the Cruisers	The High and the Mighty
1982	The Go-Go's	Vacation
1982	The Greg Kihn Band	Kihntinued
1982	Tommy Keene	Strange Alliance
1982	Phil Seymour	Phil Seymour 2
1982	The Spongetones	Beat Music
1983	Donnie Iris and the Cruisers	Fortune 410
1983	Rick Springfield	Living in Oz
1984	The Spongetones	Torn Apart
1985	Game Theory	Real Nighttime
1985	The Outfield	Play Deep
1986	Tommy Keene	Songs from the Film
1987	Game Theory	Lolita Nation
1988	Game Theory	Two Steps from the Middle Ages
1989	The Someloves	Something or Other

== 1990s ==
Year	Artist	Album
1990	Cavedogs	Joyrides for Shut-Ins
1990	Doughboys	Happy Accidents
1990	Jellyfish	Bellybutton
1991	The Knack	Serious Fun
1991	Material Issue	International Pop Overthrow
1991	Adam Schmitt	World So Bright
1991	The Spongetones	Oh Yeah!
1991	Matthew Sweet	Girlfriend
1991	Teenage Fanclub	Bandwagonesque
1991	Velvet Crush	In the Presence of Greatness
1992	Chris Mars	Horseshoes and Hand Grenades
1992	Sugar	Copper Blue
1993
1993	Flamin' Groovies	Rock Juice
1993	The Loud Family	Plants and Birds and Rocks and Things
1993	Chris Mars	75% Less Fat
1993	The Semantics	Powerbill
1993	Chris Von Sneidern	Sight & Sound
1994	Cotton Mather	Cotton Is King
1994	Sloan	Twice Removed
1994	Chris Von Sneidern	Big White Lies
1994	Weezer	Weezer
1995	20/20	20/20 / Look Out!
1995	The Breetles	Pop Go! The Breetles
1995	Teenage Fanclub	Grand Prix
1996	Ash	1977
1996	Enuff Z'Nuff	Peach Fuzz
1996	Fountains of Wayne	Fountains of Wayne
1996	The Loud Family	Interbabe Concern
1996	Sloan	One Chord to Another
1996	Chris Von Sneidern	Go!
1996	Weezer	Pinkerton
1997	The Apples In Stereo	Tone Soul Evolution
1998	Phantom Planet	Phantom Planet Is Missing
1998	Tommy Tutone	Tutone.rtf
1999	Fountains of Wayne	Utopia Parkway
1999	The Mayflies USA	Summertown

== 2000s ==
Year	Artist	Album
2000	Admiral Twin	Mock Heroic
2000	The Loud Family	Attractive Nuisance
2000	The New Pornographers	Mass Romantic
2000	Tsar	Tsar
2001	Jimmy Eat World	Bleed American
2001	The Knack	Normal as the Next Guy
2001	Ben Kweller	EP Phone Home
2001	Old 97's	Satellite Rides
2001	The Posies	Nice Cheekbones and a Ph.D.
2002	Candy Butchers	Play with Your Head
2002	The Mayflies USA	Walking in a Straight Line
2002	Myracle Brah	Super Automatic
2002	OK Go	OK Go
2002	Phantom Planet	The Guest
2003	Busted	A Present for Everyone
2003	The Exploding Hearts	Guitar Romantic
2003	Fountains of Wayne	Welcome Interstate Managers
2003	Rooney	Rooney
2004	Enuff Z'Nuff	?
2005	The New Pornographers	Twin Cinema
2005	OK Go	Oh No
2005	Chris Von Sneidern	Like Me That Way
2006	Cheap Trick	Rockford
2006	The Feeling	Twelve Stops and Home
2006	Head Automatica	Popaganda
2006	The Loud Family	What If It Works?
2006	The Nice Boys	The Nice Boys
2006	The Someloves	Don't Talk About Us: The Real Pop Recordings of the Someloves 1985–89
2007	The Wellingtons	For Friends in Far Away Places
2007	Fountains of Wayne	Traffic and Weather
2007	Paramore	Riot!
2007	The New Pornographers	Challengers
2007	We the Kings	We the Kings
2008	Cheap Girls	Find Me a Drink Home
2008	The Feeling	Join With Us
2008	Jonas Brothers	A Little Bit Longer
2009	Fireworks	All I Have to Offer Is My Own Confusion
2009	Jonas Brothers	Lines, Vines and Trying Times

== 2010s ==
Year	Artist	Album
2010	Motion City Soundtrack	My Dinosaur Life
2010	Dwight Twilley	Green Blimp
2011	Mikal Cronin	Mikal Cronin
2011	One Direction	Up All Night
2011; 2012	Kaiser Chiefs	The Future Is Medieval / Start the Revolution Without Me
2012	The dB's	Falling off the Sky
2012	Redd Kross	Researching the Blues
2012	Green Day	¡Uno!
2013	Paramore	Paramore
2013	Mikal Cronin	MCII
2014	Weezer	Everything Will Be Alright in the End
2014	5 Seconds of Summer	5 Seconds of Summer
2017	Paramore	After Laughter

== See also ==
- List of power pop artists and songs
- Lists of albums
