= Not Lame Recordings =

American independent record label

- Founded: 1994
- Founder: Bruce Brodeen
- Defunct: 2010
- Status: Defunct
- Genre: Power pop
- Country of origin: U.S.
- Location: Ft. Collins, Colorado
- Official website: www.notlame.com

Not Lame Recordings was a Ft. Collins, Colorado based independent record label specializing in power pop music.

== History ==
The label was started by Bruce Brodeen in November 1994. It primarily focused on power pop, a form of guitar and harmony driven retro-rock. Within this genre, the label quickly became the center of a small but ever expanding cult of power pop enthusiasts.

Not Lame released over 100 albums, including the annual 3-CD compilation of the International Pop Overthrow festival from 1997 through 2010 (with later years being brought out by Brodeen privately). The label also released albums for artists like Tommy Keene, Dwight Twilley, Doug Powell, and Mark Helm, as well as bands such as Myracle Brah, The Deal, Sweet Apple Pie, Hawks, and Wanderlust; and box sets for such notables as Jellyfish and The Posies. The company's online store has sold over 15,000 different CD releases.

After 16 years of operation, the label shut down on November 24, 2010. The reasons Brodeen mentioned for his decision were a career switch he had undertaken, combined with decreasing music sales in recent years in an already small market for CDs in the power pop genre. Rather than running a label, Brodeen introduced Pop Geek Heaven, an online interactive social media site, as a successor to Not Lame's role within the power pop community.

== See also ==
- List of record labels
- List of power pop artists and songs
