= The Thirsty Whale =

Rock music club in River Grove, Illinois

Coordinates: 41.9297°N 87.8467°W

The Thirsty Whale, which opened in 1971, was a rock music club in River Grove, Illinois. It brought in acts like Blue Öyster Cult, Off Broadway, Molly Hatchet, Black Oak Arkansas, Extreme, Keith Reid with Bowser from Sha-Na-Na, Alice In Chains (opened for Extreme), Quiet Riot, Foghat, Johnny Winter, Mother Love Bone (who played their only Chicago show at the Whale), Tuff, Danger Danger, Ratt, Lita Ford, Dream Theater, Kings X, Nuclear Assault, and Peter Criss., Mike DeFoy [Sky Pilot], Survivor performed here monthly early in their career.

Future Rock and Roll Hall of Fame inductee Cheap Trick played there regularly in the late 1970s, promoting the release of their first two albums, Black & White and In Color, respectively.

The club began to be a showcase for local Chicago area hard rock and heavy metal bands such as Enuff Z'nuff, D'Molls, Life Sex and Death (LSD), 7th heaven band and others from the mid-80s through its closing in 1996. The height of the club was during the mid-1980s. Young bands would have the opportunity to open for national acts to grow their fan base and sometimes the attention of major record companies. Although the Thirsty Whale was a small club in size it had its own scene and from it grew a local music magazine, The Chicago Rocker, which was founded by Tony LaBarabra, one of the clubs many booking agents over the years. Chicago never had the metal scene that Los Angeles had but The Thirsty Whale was always a stopover for most bands playing the arenas in Chicago. If you were to ask a local rock musician from this era, they would say "Without The Thirsty Whale, there wouldn't have been a rock scene in Chicago".

The club closed its doors on June 2, 1996, and was demolished to make way for a BP gas station and McDonald's. LaBarbara has hosted a "Thirsty Whale Reunion" where some of the bands that played at the Whale, back in its heyday, held a one-night-only reunion.

The club was honored as part of the inaugural class of the Illinois Rock & Roll Museum on Route 66.
