= Sweet Apple Pie =

Sweet Apple Pie is a power pop band from Toulouse, France.

== History ==
The group, which features three siblings, formed in 1995, and released their debut EP in 1998. They began touring in France and also toured America opening for The Posies, Cotton Mather, and The Steamkings. The group's first full-length, Everybody Wants to Be a Supertiger, was released in 2002 in America, France, and Japan. Another full-length followed in 2004.

== Members ==
- Gilles Davancens - bass, vocals
- Laurent Davancens - guitar, vocals
- Fanny Davancens - keyboards, vocals
- Sylvain Jean - drums

== Discography ==
- First Slice EP (1998)
- She Shines EP (2002)
- Everybody Wants to Be a Supertiger (Spirit of Jungle Records/Not Lame Recordings, 2002)
- Split single with Cotton Mather (2002)
- Between the Lines (Not Lame/Sony France, 2004)
