= Speedies =

- Origin: New York City
- Genre: Power pop
- Years active: 1970s
- Labels: Golden Disc Records; Speedy Delivery Music; Radio Heartbeat
- Past members: Eric Hoffert; Allen Hurkin-Torres; John Marino; John Carlucci; Gregory Crewdson

Speedies were a power pop band popular in the New York City area. Their 1979 song, "Let Me Take Your Photo," was featured in a Hewlett Packard commercial and on The Tonight Show with Jay Leno. Members included Gregory Crewdson and John Carlucci.

The band was described as "glam bubble gum" by The New York Times. Crewdson listed The Beatles, Sex Pistols and Bay City Rollers as their main influences.

Eric Hoffert was studying at Bronx High School of Science while playing in the band on the weekends. He later helped develop QuickTime digital media player. Allen Hurkin-Torres was a New York Supreme Court justice from 2002 to 2010.

Speedies released an archival collection in 2007.

== Discography ==
- Speedy Delivery (2007), Radio Heartbeat

=== Singles ===
- Let Me Take Your Foto (1979), Golden Disc Records
- Something On My Mind (1981), Speedy Delivery Music
