= The Innocents (Australian band) =

Australian power pop band

- Origin: Hobart, Tasmania, Australia
- Genres: Power pop
- Years active: 1975–present
- Website: www.theinnocents.com.au

The Innocents are a power pop band formed in Hobart, Tasmania in 1975. Featuring singer-songwriters David Minchin, Charles Touber, Greg Cracknell, and drummer Brent "Beep" Jeffrey, The Innocents—originally called Beathoven—are one of only three Tasmanian bands to ever have Australian chart success (the others being The Kravats and MEO 245).

== Career ==
=== 1973–1979: Hobart ===
David Minchin (guitar/vocals), Charles Touber (guitar/vocals), Greg Cracknell (bass/vocals), Brent "Beep" Jeffrey (drums 1975–1979). Renowned for their popularity in Hobart in the late 1970s, their first record release was "Do You Remember The Time/Darlin'" on the Candle label. There was a local equivalent of Beatlemania about The Innocents early years (sometimes referred to as "Tasmania") and ensured that when they took their touring technique of focusing on school dances and lunchtime concerts to Melbourne in 1977, success and press cynicism followed. Shortly following the move the band began touring the East coast of Australia. Such was their popularity after several months, ambulances were a regular fixture outside their shows, and the band were offered their own signature ice cream line.

Eventually signing a much heralded international contract with EMI which resulted in the release of "Shy Girl/Does it Matter as Much to You" under their original name Beathoven. The band were then released from their label, (despite being the favoured nominees for Best New Group of 1978 Award from amongst Cold Chisel, Models and The Sports). When Kim Fowley discovered them in his Australian search for "the new Abba or Beatles" they were forced to change their name, as EMI still owned the name under their contractual agreement.

=== 1980–1999: Sydney and career success ===
As The Innocents, they were picked up by Trafalgar Productions/RCA in early 1980 and relocated to Sydney. Here they recorded their hit single "Sooner or Later" which, after a performance on the TV show Countdown, peaked at number 48 nationally, The Innocents were championed by Kim Fowley, Nick Lowe, Molly Meldrum and Greg Shaw. All the press hyperbole (particularly from rock historian Glenn A. Baker's pen, e.g. – "Perhaps the greatest power-pop band in the whole world since the demise of the Raspberries") could not encourage RCA to support the band, despite Fowley's enthusiasm in particular. Faced with delivering pop singles (such as their follow-up "Come Tonight") that weren't supported by the label the band disintegrated, with some members returning to Tasmania in 1981.

In 1984, Raven Records released the ironically entitled Here We Come! album which collected their Beathoven recordings as well as a number of later recordings with Kim Fowley and a third unreleased RCA single.

=== 2000–present ===
2000 saw The Innocents realise their later celebrity in the US – a place in which none of their recordings were released – and an invitation to play The Troubadour and the International Pop Overthrow festival alongside fellow power-pop exponents Doug Fieger of The Knack, Nancy Sinatra, The Rubinoos and The Cowsills.

The 2CD compilation album The No Hit Wonders from Down Under was released in 2002 which featured much new material and rapidly sold out of its limited initial run.

Inspired by this and an increasing number of international fan letters, they recorded a new album Pop Factory in 2006 and promoted it with a European tour which included gigs at Liverpool's legendary Cavern club, a recording session at Abbey Road Studios, rave reviews for their appearance at the inaugural Hamburg Sound Festival (where they played requests for Cynthia Lennon and Astrid Kirchherr), and dates in Tokyo.

October 2007 saw The Innocents travel to Germany where they recorded a version of a song co-written by Tony Sheridan and Paul McCartney in 1960, "Tell Me If You Can" with Sheridan himself. Previously unrecorded, The Innocents went to Friedrich-Ebert recording studios where The Beatles had previously worked with Sheridan when recording their first ever song My Bonnie. Sheridan claimed meeting The Innocents was 'fate'. "I like the group. The way they play reminded me of what we used to do back then. They did great harmonies. It reminded me very much of The Beatles."

== Discography ==
=== Albums ===
Title	Album details
Here We Come	Released: 1984; Format: LP, Cassette; Label: Raven Records (RVLP-17)
No Hit Wonders from Down Under (with Beathoven)	Released: 2000; Format: CD, download; Label: Zip Records (ZipAust006); Greatest hits
Pop Factory	Released: 2006; Format: CD, download; Label: Zip Records (ZIP 033)
Teardrop Kiss	Released: 2018; Format: CD, download; Label: Public Opinion Music (PUBLIC 0027)

=== Singles ===
List of singles, with selected chart positions
Year	Title	Peak chart positions
Year	Title	AUS
1980	"Sooner Or Later"/"The "B" Side"	58
1981	"Come Tonight" / "Absence"	-
