= Joy Rides for Shut-Ins =

1990 studio album by the Cavedogs

Studio album by the Cavedogs
- Released: 1990
- Recorded: 1990
- Genre: Rock, power pop
- Length: 38:48
- Label: Enigma
- Producer: Ed Stasium

The Cavedogs chronology
Joy Rides for Shut-Ins (1990)	Soul Martini (1992)

Joy Rides for Shut-Ins is the first studio album by the American band the Cavedogs, released in 1990. The band supported the album by touring with the Dead Milkmen and Mojo Nixon.

== Critical reception ==
Professional ratings
Review scores
Source	Rating
AllMusic	4.5/5 stars

USA Today praised the "sass and spit-in-your-face attitude of punk [and] the melodic qualities of solid hard rock".

In 1992, The New Yorker called the album "a collection of blissful power pop crunchers". Trouser Press noted that "while quotes from summer-of-love sources (Move, Floyd, Beatles and Monkees to name but a few) abound you'll also hear enough echoes of the Jam, dB's, R.E.M. and the Smithereens to know the Boston-based trio has progressed past pure paisley."

== Track listing ==
All songs written by the Cavedogs

1. "Tayter Country" – 2:16
2. "Leave Me Alone" – 3:37
3. "Bed of Nails" – 3:22
4. "Proud Land" – 3:44
5. "What in the World?" – 3:06
6. "Right on the Nail" – 4:33
7. "Step Down" – 3:37
8. "Baba Ghanooj" – 4:22
9. "Calm Him Down" – 3:52
10. "Taking Up Space" – 3:28
11. "La La La" – 2:37
12. "[Hidden Track]" – 0:24

== Personnel ==
- The Cavedogs – Producer, Engineer
- Mike Denneen – Piano
- Paul Hamingson – Engineer, Remix Assistant
- Paul Q. Kolderie – Engineer
- John Lupfer – Producer, Engineer
- Michael McLaughlin – Photography
- Suzanne Mueller – cellist (Baba Ghanooj)
- Carl Plaster – Engineer
- Mark Rivers – Bass, Drums, Keyboards, Vocals, Producer
- Sean Slade – Engineer
- Todd Spahr – Guitar, Vocals, Bells, Producer, Sleigh Bells
- Ed Stasium – Producer, Engineer, Remixing
- Brian Stevens – Bass, Harmonica, Vocals, Producer

== Charts ==
=== Singles ===
Billboard (North America)

Year	Single	Chart	Position
1990	Leave Me Alone	Modern Rock Tracks	17
