= Michael Ruane =

Michael Ruane may refer to:

- J. Michael Ruane, member of the Massachusetts House of Representatives
- Michael Ruane (poker player), American poker player
- Michael Ruane, drummer with Pezband
