= Hey Julie =

Single by Fountains of Wayne

from the album Welcome Interstate Managers
- B-side: "Baby I've Changed"
- Released: September 6, 2004
- Genre: Power pop
- Length: 2:38
- Label: S-Curve; Virgin
- Songwriters: Chris Collingwood; Adam Schlesinger
- Producers: Collingwood; Mike Denneen; Schlesinger

Fountains of Wayne singles chronology
| "Mexican Wine" (2004) | "Hey Julie" (2004) | "Maureen" (2005) |

"Hey Julie" is a song by American rock band Fountains of Wayne. It was released on September 6, 2004, as the third and final single from their third studio album, Welcome Interstate Managers. The song peaked at number 57 on the UK Singles Chart and number 58 on the Scottish Singles Chart.

== Composition ==
"Hey Julie" was written and produced by Chris Collingwood and Adam Schlesinger. Mike Deneen also produced the track. Musically, the track is described as acoustic, with its lyrics focusing on a man working at a "horrible" office job, who can't wait to get back home to a girl named Julie: "working all day for a mean little man / With a clip-on tie and a rub-on tan / Sometimes I catch myself staring into space / Counting down the hours till I get to see your face."

== Critical reception ==
The song was met with positive reviews from music critics. Neil Daniels of MusicOHM stated, "It moves along slowly, with simple back-to-basic chords, an harmonica, lighthearted vocals and the obvious introverted lyrics [...] 'Hey Julie' will probably not cause an earthquake in the charts - but it is still a finely crafted, well tuned little number that should gain quiet recognition. Iain Moffat of Playlouder wrote, "this goes a little way in making up for the foully jaw-dropping aftertaste that 'Stacy's Mom' dragged around [...] Pleasant enough power-pop, we suppose, if never quite explaining the profound enthusiasm they seem to have inspired in certain quarters lately." Jay Lustig of NJ.com complimented the track with a review title of "Song of the Day", remarking, "It's brief and to the point -- The melody is pleasant, the vibe dreamy and pleasant."

== Cover versions ==
Following the death of Schlesinger who died from complications of COVID-19, Eva Hendricks of Charly Bliss covered the song as a tribute to Schlesinger. Mikey Erg also covered the track, which was featured on Saving for a Custom Van, a tribute album to Schlesinger.

== Track listing ==
US CD single
| No. | Title | Length |
|---|---|---|
| 1. | "Hey Julie" | 2:38 |

UK CD single
| No. | Title | Length |
|---|---|---|
| 1. | "Hey Julie" | 2:38 |
| 2. | "Baby I've Changed" | 2:05 |
| 3. | "Killermont Street" | 3:10 |

7" Vinyl
| No. | Title | Length |
|---|---|---|
| 1. | "Hey Julie" | 2:38 |
| 2. | "Baby I've Changed" | 2:05 |

== Personnel ==
Credits for "Hey Julie" retrieved from album's liner notes.

Fountains of Wayne

- Chris Collingwood – lead vocals, rhythm guitar
- Jody Porter – lead guitar, backing vocals
- Adam Schlesinger – bass, synthesizers, backing vocals
- Brian Young – drums, percussion

Production

- Chris Collingwood – producer
- Adam Schlesinger – producer, additional engineer
- Mike Denneen – producer, engineer
- John Holbrook – mixing
- George Marino – mastering
- Matt Beaudoin – assistant engineer
- Rafi Sofer – assistant engineer
- Rudyard Lee Cullers – assistant engineer
- Richard Furch – additional engineer

== Charts ==
Chart performance for "Hey Julie"
| Chart (2004) | Peak position |
|---|---|
| Scotland Singles (OCC) | 58 |
| UK Singles (OCC) | 57 |

== Release history ==
Release dates and formats for "Hey Julie"
| Region | Date | Format | Label | Ref. |
|---|---|---|---|---|
| United Kingdom | September 6, 2004 | CD | S-Curve; Virgin | |
| Various | September 6, 2004 | Digital download | S-Curve; Virgin | |
