= International Pop Overthrow =

Power pop music festival

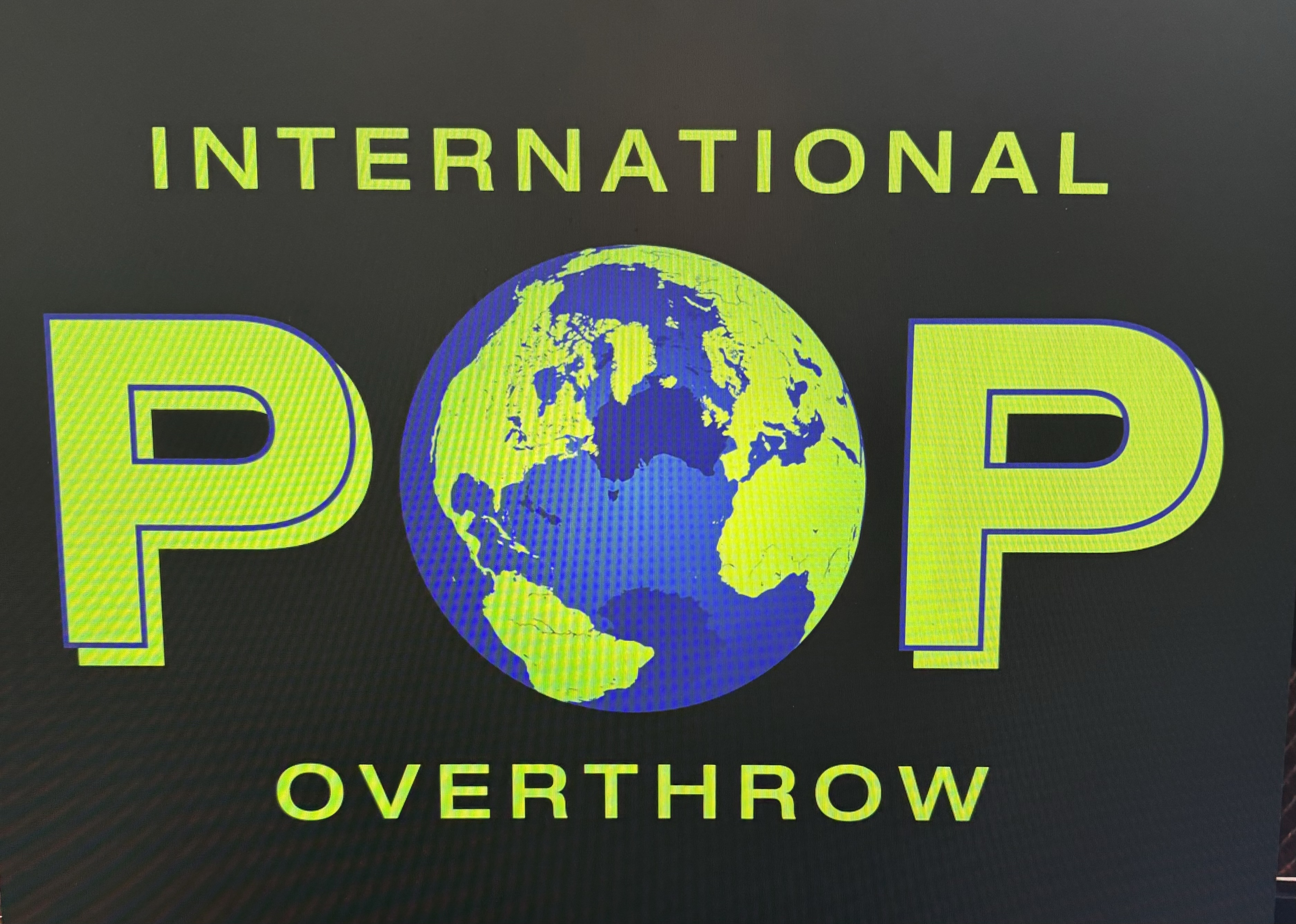

The International Pop Overthrow (often referred to as simply The IPO) is an American-originated music festival, devoted to power pop music and related genres. The festival is dedicated to bring classic pop music to the public, and is run by CEO and founder David Bash and Rina Bardfield. Although the festival has over the years featured several major label acts, such as Phantom Planet, Maroon 5 (under their previous incarnation, Kara's Flowers), and The Click Five, Bash tries to maintain the grassroots feel of the festival by featuring primarily unsigned bands, and presenting them in a festival platform with similar minded artists.

== Conception and evolution ==
The International Pop Overthrow Music Festival was created in December 1997. The name was chosen to pay tribute to Jim Ellison, singer songwriter of Material Issue, a power pop band from Chicago, whose 1991 debut album was entitled International Pop Overthrow. In August 1998, the first International Pop Overthrow festival was held in Los Angeles, featuring 120 pop and rock bands from Los Angeles, several other US cities, and 10 bands from five countries: Canada, Australia, Sweden, France, and the Netherlands. Over the next three years, its roster grew to include bands from countries such as Japan, Norway, Austria, Israel, and the United Kingdom. At the 2001 festival, during a panel discussion, it was suggested by several bands that Bash take International Pop Overthrow on the road.

The first city outside Los Angeles in which the International Pop Overthrow Festival (IPO) was held was New York in December 2001, followed by Chicago in April 2002. The festival became international in 2003 when Bash was approached by Beatles historian Jean Catharell to hold the festival in Liverpool, UK. The festival has since become a yearly event at the Cavern Club, drawing unsigned pop and rock talent from around the world. The festival is now held annually in 16 different cities, and Bash continues to explore opportunities to take the festival to additional locales, with Spain, Japan, and Australia high on the list of possible future International Pop Overthrow locations.

The International Pop Overthrow Festival has been held in several venues, such as the Cavern Club (Liverpool UK), the Troubadour (Los Angeles), the El Rey (Los Angeles), Spaceland (Los Angeles), the Abbey (Chicago), Schubas (Chicago), Bottom of the Hill (San Francisco), The Rivoli (Toronto), the Khyber (Philadelphia), Arlene's Grocery (New York), Kenny's Castaways (New York), the Knitting Factory (Los Angeles and New York), the Middle East (Boston), the Railway (Vancouver, BC), City Hall (Denver), and the Orange County Fair (Orange County, CA).

The International Pop Overthrow festival has been recognized in an interactive exhibit at The Grammy Museum, as helping the power pop genre "persist into the new millenium."

Artists who have played the International Pop Overthrow Festival include Walter Egan, Harmony Grass, Shoes, Off Broadway, John Wicks & The Records, The Rubinoos, The Cowsills, Wednesday Week, Russ Tolman, and Enuff Z'Nuff, as well as recent and current stars, such as Kara's Flowers (now known as Maroon 5), Phantom Planet, The Click Five, Jason Falkner, Seth Swirsky and The 88.

The International Pop Overthrow Festival has been covered in numerous publications, including The Los Angeles Times, L.A. Weekly, The Chicago Sun Times, The Boston Herald, The Boston Globe, New York Magazine, The New Yorker, The Liverpool Echo, BBC Liverpool, SPIN!, Goldmine, Amplifier, and Billboard. In addition, Bash has been featured in a Sonicbids promoter profile, and noted Liverpool historian and BBC radio personality, Spencer Leigh, devoted several pages to the festival in his book, The Cavern: The Most Famous Club in the World.

From 1998 to 2000, Del-Fi Records released an annual CD compilation featuring bands that have played in any of the cities which the festival has appeared. From volumes three to thirteen, Not Lame Recordings issued the annual collections. After Not Lame shut down, the website Pop Geek Heaven released volumes 14 through 20. Omnivore Recordings has issued the two most recent volumes.

== Host cities ==
As of 2010: Boston, Chicago, Denver, Detroit, Liverpool (UK), Los Angeles, Milwaukee, New York City, Phoenix, Portland, San Diego, Seattle, Toronto and Vancouver.

Added in 2011: Austin, Dallas, London (UK) and San Francisco.

Added in 2013: Atlanta and Nashville.

Added in 2015: Stockholm (Sweden).

Added in 2017: Hamilton and Philadelphia.

== See also ==
List of power pop artists and songs
