= Soul Martini =

Studio album by Cavedogs
- Released: 1992
- Studio: Ocean Way
- Genres: Rock, pop
- Label: Capitol
- Producer: Michael Beinhorn

Cavedogs chronology
Joy Rides for Shut-Ins (1990)	Soul Martini (1992)

Soul Martini is the second album by the American band the Cavedogs, released in 1992. "Boy in a Plastic Bubble" was released as a single. The band supported the album by touring with Material Issue. The Cavedogs broke up six months after the release of Soul Martini.

== Production ==
Recorded at Ocean Way, the album was produced by Michael Beinhorn. The three bandmembers shared in the songwriting. "Sonny Day" is about road life during concert tours.

== Critical reception ==
Professional ratings
Review scores
Source	Rating
AllMusic	2.5/5 stars
Calgary Herald	B
Chicago Tribune	3.5/4 stars
The Republican	2.5/5 stars

The Chicago Tribune wrote: "What makes this trio of pop fanatics from Boston so consistently interesting—their songs so inescapable—is the way they stand the history of rock on its head and rummage through the possibilities." The Calgary Herald noted that the "songs jump from trippy psychedelic dance tracks to loud 'n' proud industrial rockers."

The Orlando Sentinel concluded that "the Cavedogs are that increasing rarity—a group with real depth in its writing, and a truly adventurous approach to recording." The Washington Post deemed the album "energetic and accomplished but rather labored." The San Antonio Express-News considered the album to be "refined grunge pop, mixing abrasive guitars with catchy melodies with just the right dash of psychedelia."

== Track listing ==
All songs are credited to Rivers, Spahr, and Stevens.

1. Love Grenade - 3:36
2. Here Comes Rosie - 3:28
3. Sorrow (Boots of Pain) - 4:23
4. As You Were - 2:36
5. Boy in a Plastic Bubble - 3:07
6. You're Put Away (Folderol) - 5:25
7. Sonny Day - 3:24
8. I, I, I, - 3:25
9. Murder - 3:02
10. On for the Ride - 4:17
11. Tarzan and His Arrowheads - 4:02
12. Circus Song - 5:07
