= The Voodoo Jets =

American rock band

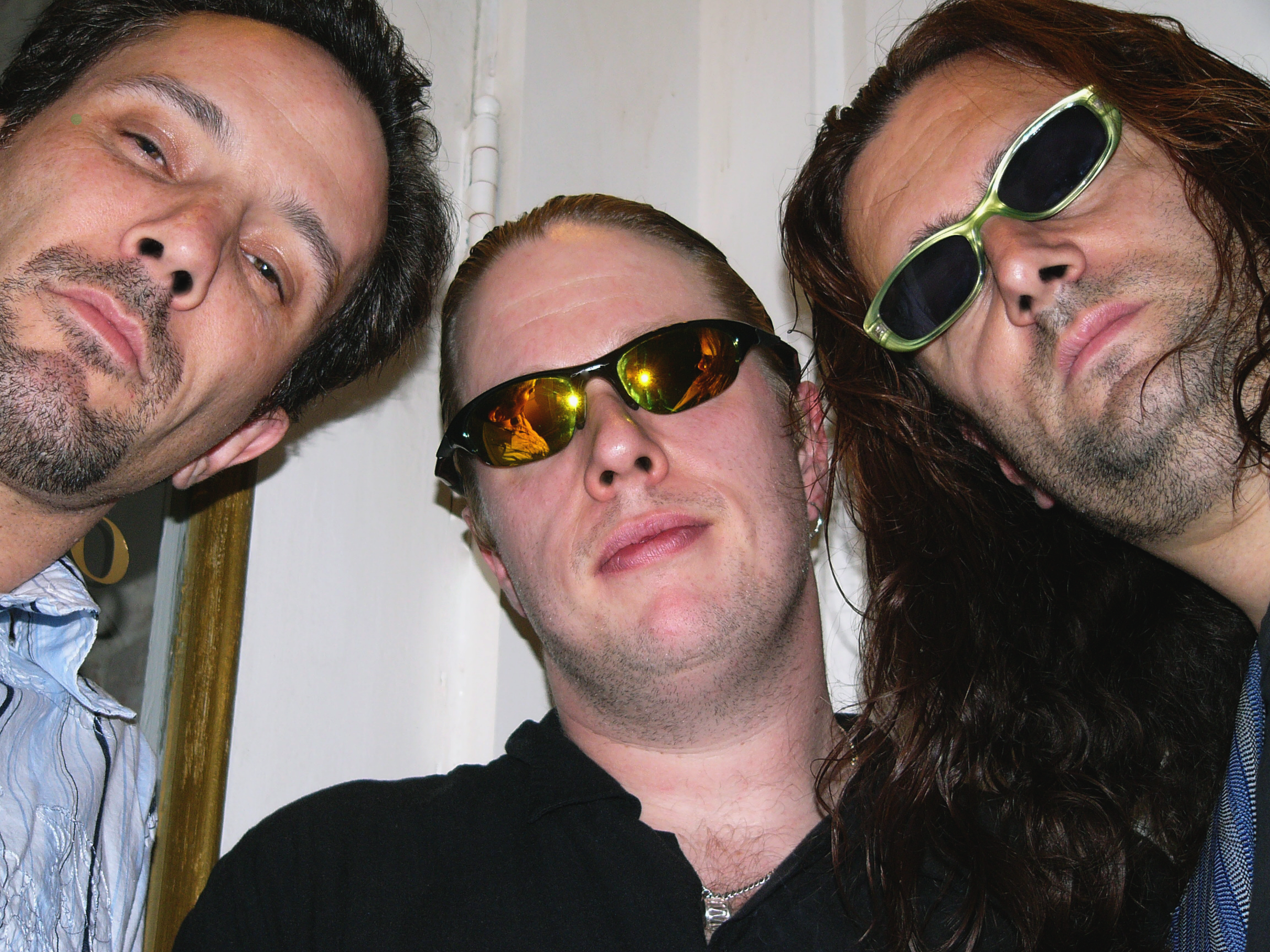
- The Voodoo Jets, 2004

Background information
- Origin: Connecticut, U.S.
- Genres: alternative rock, power pop
- Years active: 2000–present
- Members: Micah Sheveloff; Frank Perrouna; Greg Trabandt
- Past members: Clint Amereno; John Fowler

The Voodoo Jets are a power trio from Southern Connecticut who play power pop/rock music without electric guitars. The instrument line-up includes keyboards, bass guitar, and drums. The band was formed in 2000, and their 2006 album, Supersonic (produced by David Minehan), was released on 3 Nutz Music and features 12 songs. Their second album, From Greens to Eternity (featuring 13 tracks), was released in 2010 after the passing of band member John Fowler. In 2019, their single Lost Singles was released by WIRC Records.

== Band members ==
The band was founded by Micah Sheveloff, Francesco Perrouna, and John Fowler.

=== Micah Sheveloff ===
Keyboardist and backing vocalist Sheveloff and Fowler continued on when Perrouna left the band in 2007. Sheveloff has also worked with the Dream and the Detours, and has shared the stage in the past with Gary Cherone. He considers Cheap Trick to be one of his biggest influences.

It was because of his practice location that Sheveloff, a classically trained keyboardist (his father was a classical music professor at Boston University), stumbled upon his “keyboards that sound like guitars” sound by accident: he was sharing practice space with Joe Perry of Aerosmith fame (in a Boston warehouse in the ‘80s) and plugged his Fender Rhodes keyboard into Perry’s amplifier. He was so pleased with the result that he began to explore the idea of using keyboards without guitars in rock music. He eventually shifted to the Roland AX-1 (also known as a keytar) to achieve the “guitar-like” sound (“complete with the percussive plucks and fuzzy feedback”) he was looking for.

=== Francesco Perrouna ===
Perrouna, the founding bassist, also served as the band’s first lead singer. He and drummer Fowler were playing together in a band called Swag Hooks when Perrouna introduced Fowler to Sheveloff. The Beatles and Prince are his biggest influences.

=== John Fowler ===
Fowler, who played drums and provided backing vocals for The Voodoo Jets, was best known for his recording and touring with the ‘90s hair metal band Steelheart and also performed with the bands Smoke and Rage of Angels. His biggest influences were Rush, Kiss and Led Zeppelin. In addition to his work in bands, Fowler was a drum teacher. Fowler died in March 2008, at the age of 42, after suffering a brain aneurysm.

=== Clint Amereno ===
Amereno joined the band briefly as the bassist when Perrouna left in 2007. He has also played live with the band 12 Stones.

=== Greg Trabandt ===
Greg Trabandt took over as drummer after the passing of John Fowler. Trabandt has played rock, jazz, and even with the All Eastern UCONN Symphony Orchestra. Trabandt's first original project, Furious Styles, was produced by Simon Townshend and managed by Kamal from the Jerky Boys. Furious Styles toured with the Spin Doctors, Maceo Parker, Blues Traveler & other artists, opening the door for Trabandt to get session work in both LA and New York.
