= The Starjets =

Northern Irish pop group

Background information
- Also known as: Tango Brigade
- Origin: Belfast, Northern Ireland
- Genres: Punk rock, power pop
- Years active: 1976–1980; 2019–present
- Label: Epic
- Members: Terry Sharpe; Paul Bowen; Liam L'Estrange; Sean Martin

The Starjets are a power pop group from Belfast, Northern Ireland.

== History ==
The band was formed in June 1976. The Starjets consists of guitarist/vocalist Terry Sharpe, guitarist/vocalist Paul Bowen, bassist Sean Martin and drummer Liam L'Estrange. The group sported a mix of punk and mainstream pop influences. Early sets consisted of such 1960s pop standards as "Please Please Me" by The Beatles and "Sugar, Sugar" by The Archies. They opened for groups as diverse as the Bay City Rollers and Stiff Little Fingers.

The group secured a major record label recording contract with Epic Records; they were signed by Muff Winwood. They released a number of singles in 1979, with their only chart hit being "War Stories" b/w "Do the Push", which peaked at No. 51 on the UK Singles Chart. The A-side is a celebration of World War II comic book stories, such as those of Sgt. Fury. They released one album, 1979's God Bless the Starjets, but it failed commercially. Following the release of the "Shiraleo" single in March 1980, the band changed its name to Tango Brigade and released one more single, "Donegal", before finally splitting up. After a brief stint performing vocal duties with the Angelic Upstarts (most notably taking lead vocals on the song "Reason Why?" from the album of the same title), Sharpe went on co-write a couple of tracks on Bananarama's debut album Deep Sea Skiving, before scoring a Top 20 hit in 1988 with his new band The Adventures.

The Starjets reformed in January 2019 and are performing live again. In 2020, Billie Joe Armstrong recorded a version of "War Stories" for his covers album No Fun Mondays. In March 2022, they appeared on The Heritage Chart Show with Mike Read, as broadcast on Local and Talking Pictures TV, performing live in the studio. The Starjets were voted the most successful Heritage Chart Act of 2021, with singles such as 2020's "Geordie Best" and 2022's "King Upon a London Hill" making it to the number one spot.

As of 2025, the Starjets consists only of Paul Bowen, as Terry Sharpe has reformed The Adventures with Pat and Eileen Gribben, for a new album called Once More With Feeling.
