= Pezband =

American power pop band

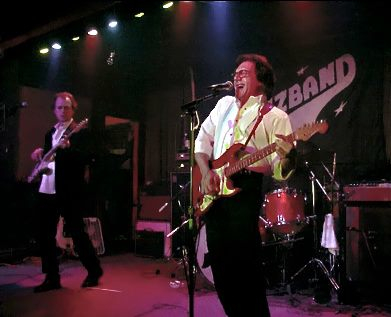

Background information
- Origin: Oak Park, Illinois, United States
- Genres: Power pop
- Years active: 1971–1983, 2006–2007, 2012–2014, 2016
- Labels: Frodis; Passport; Arista; ABC/Dunhill; AirMail; Radar; Not Lame; Rhino
- Past members: Mimi Betinis; Mike Gorman; Mick Rain; Dan Wade; Tommy Gauvenda; John Pazdan; Cliff Johnson; West Davis

Pezband was an American power pop band, formed in 1971 in the Chicago suburb of Oak Park, Illinois, United States.

The ensemble began in the fall of 1971 when four Oak Park musicians teamed up to jam on covers of songs by The Yardbirds, Kinks and Peter Green-era Fleetwood Mac. The original lineup consisted of Mimi Betinis (guitar and lead vocals), Mick Rain (drums and vocals), John Pazdan (guitar, piano and vocals), and Mike Gorman (bass and vocals)

Mick Ruane (aka Mick Rain), the drummer for Pezband, died on August 14, 2021. According to the Chicago Sun Times: "Mike Ruane was the big man playing the big drum set for Pezband, one of a wave of effervescent power pop groups also including Cheap Trick, Material Issue and Shoes to emerge from the Chicago area in the 1970s and 1980s. Mr. Ruane, known by the nickname Mick Rain, died on August 14 at Tampa General Hospital of complications from COVID-19, according to his daughter Nicoletta Montaner".

== Early career ==
Pezband played its first shows at small clubs in the Chicago suburbs, then advanced to performing on Rush Street, one of several large entertainment districts in Chicago. Singer Cliff Johnson was added to the lineup in early 1972. Playing venues such as Rush Up, they often performed five days in a row, four to five sets a night.

John Pazdan left the group in December 1972, replaced by guitarist Dan Wade. With the new lineup, Pezband started touring the American Midwest and East Coast, incorporating original songs into their sets. A year later, guitarist Tommy Gawenda replaced Wade, and the band played the West Coast as well, with shows at Whisky a Go Go and Starwood, both in West Hollywood. By the end of 1975, Johnson was replaced by singer West Davis. In 1976, the group made the decision to play as a foursome with Betinis back as lead singer. They recruited NRBQ manager Mike Lembo and were soon signed to Passport/ABC Dunhill Records, relocating to New Jersey to be closer to management and record company.

Pezband's eponymously titled first album was recorded in early 1977, at The House of Music in New Jersey, with E-Street sax player Clarence Clemons, synthesist Larry Fast, and jazz trumpeter Randy Brecker making guest appearances. Positive reviews followed their first release, and the band found itself showcased as "most promising act" at the ABC/Dunhill record convention. Soon after featured on national TV, they appeared on The Today Show with Jane Pauley, who commented that "this is the sound (Power Pop) everybody will be talking about."

== Later career ==
In 1978, the group opened major stadium shows for Fleetwood Mac and Supertramp and played in New York at Max's Kansas City and CBGB's. By the end of that year, the band flew to London to record their second record, Laughing In The Dark, at Jethro Tull's studio, Maison Rouge. Guest musicians included Tommy Eyre and King Crimson sax player Mel Collins. Famed cover art designers Hipgnosis produced the artwork for the album (the first Hipgnosis cover design for an American band). While in London, they also cut a live EP, Too Old Too Soon, at the club Dingwall's, the first American group to record there. As 1978 drew to a close, Rolling Stone cited the Laughing in the Dark LP as one of the top records of the year.

In 1979, Pezband moved back to Chicago, recording their second live EP, Thirty Seconds Over Schaumburg, at the suburban Chicago club B.Ginnings. At the end of the year, their third LP, Cover To Cover, was recorded at Tanglewood Studios in Brookfield, Illinois with John Pavletic at the mixing board and included guest Scott May on keyboards.

1980, however, saw an industry-wide slump hitting the music and record business. Indie labels like Passport were particularly affected, and their support for Pezband faded. The group briefly disbanded but reorganized in 1981 as a trio with Betinis, Rain and Pazdan. This version picked up a production deal with former Oak Parker/ Los Angeles producer Paul Broucek and in 1982 recorded an EP titled Women & Politics at the Record Plant in Los Angeles. But their distribution deal fell through, and the group went on hiatus in 1983.

== Hiatus ==
While on hiatus, the members took on various side projects, Betinis working with Cheap Trick bassist Tom Petersson, Pazdan founding the alt-country group Big Guitars from Memphis, while doing session and live work with everyone from David Sanborn to Chuck Berry. In 2006 and 2007, the trio of Betinis, Rain, and Pazdan played shows in Chicago, London, and Liverpool. They also recorded new material. Though well-received, they again disbanded until 2012.

== Reunion ==
Unexpectedly, in the spring of 2012, producer (and now President of Music at Warner Bros. Pictures) Paul Broucek sent the Pezband trio a mastered version of Women & Politics, the EP they had recorded in Los Angeles in 1982. Broucek, by this time an executive and well established music producer for New Line Cinema and Warner Brothers motion pictures (including Austin Powers and Lord of the Rings) had started a boutique label, Common Market. He would see to it that Women & Politics would finally be released. This had the effect of restarting the group, which conducted under-the-radar gigs in Chicago, appearing unannounced at small Chicago venues.

== Japan tour in 2013 ==
Drawing from a pool of five records, the Women & Politics EP, and new work written and recorded over the years, Pezband has, as of mid-2012, formally returned. The band is booked to tour in Japan in October 2013, with concert dates scheduled for Tokyo, Kyoto and Sapporo. According to the Pezband Facebook page:

As alluded to here the last few days-We are headed to Japan in October for shows in Tokyo, Kyoto and Sapporo. We will also have a new cd released there, and a limited run single as well. The material is what we consider the 4th Pezband studio LP: unreleased songs, demos and bits from 1978/1979. The cd and single are being put out (in Japan only, at least for now) by the brilliant Japanese label Airmail, the same folks who re released the Pez back catalog 7 years ago (that issue was promptly sold out).Performing in Japan has been something we have wanted to do ever since we started our noisy rock combo in 1971. We have a wonderful fan base in Japan and are really looking forward to finally being able to play for them.

Tours across the US and a follow-up album to Women and Politics are also in the works.

== Women & Politics ==
As of 2015, the Women & Politics EP was still sitting on the shelf. Fortunately for the band, Frodis Records label owner Scott Carlson had heard about it, and when he found out it was never released, he got the band's permission and released it in April 2016. Limited to an initial pressing of 500 12" vinyl copies, with the first 100 copies in gold tinted vinyl, the EP was well received by critics and fans alike. A digital version was released the following May on CD Baby.

== Discography ==
=== Studio albums ===
- Pezband (Passport Records, 1977)
- Laughing in the Dark (Passport Records [USA]/Radar Records [UK], 1978)
- Cover to Cover (Passport Records, 1979)
- Dangerous People (Air Mail Recordings, [Japan], 2013)

=== EPs ===
- Two Old Two Soon (Passport, 1978)
- Thirty Seconds Over Schaumburg (Passport, 1978)
- Women & Politics (Frodis, recorded 1982, released 2016)

Note: Pezband's 50 studio tracks (including material from their two live EPs) were reissued in 2005 on CD (digipak format).

=== Compilations ===
- DIY: American Power Pop: Come Out and Play (Rhino, 1993)
- Poptopia!: Power Pop Classics Of The '70's (Rhino, 1997)
- 20 Greats from the Golden Decade of Power Pop (Varese, 2005)
