= 20/20 (20/20 album) =

Studio album by 20/20
- Released: 1979
- Genre: Power pop
- Label: Portrait
- Producer: Earle Mankey

20/20 chronology
20/20 (1979)	Look Out! (1981)

Singles from 20/20
- 1. "Tell Me Why / Yellow Pills" Released: 1979; 2. "Cheri / Backyard Guys" Released: 1979

20/20 is the debut studio album by American power pop band 20/20, released in 1979 by Portrait Records, a subsidiary of CBS.

== Critical reception ==
Professional ratings
Review scores
Source	Rating
AllMusic	4.5/5 stars
Christgau's Record Guide	B+

Trouser Press wrote that 20/20 "stands proudly" as one of the best power pop albums to date. Reviewing in Christgau's Record Guide: Rock Albums of the Seventies (1981), Robert Christgau said: "Just about all of these dense, cleverly constructed tunes would sound great on the radio. If they have some other reason for being, though, neither lyrics nor vocals—which seem to avoid both banality and its opposite as a simple matter of power pop taste—let on what it is. When CBS breaks a few hits off this we'll remember it as a classic. But CBS won't."

== Track listing ==
1. "The Sky Is Falling 7/79" (Chris Silagyi) – 1:13
2. "Yellow Pills" (Steve Allen) – 4:15
3. "Cheri" (Ron Flynt) – 3:18
4. "Out of This Time" (Allen) – 3:13
5. "Tell Me Why (Can't Understand You)" (Allen, Mike Gallo) – 4:22
6. "Tonight We Fly" (Flynt, Allen) – 2:42
7. "Remember the Lightning" (Flynt) – 2:48
8. "She's an Obsession" (Allen) – 2:59
9. "Leaving Your World Behind" (Flynt) – 4:25
10. "Backyard Guys" (Allen) – 2:50
11. "Jet Lag" (Gallo) – 4:02
12. "Action Now" (Allen) – 3:01
