= The Real Underground =

Compilation album by Tommy Keene
- Released: 1993
- Recorded: 1982–1991
- Genre: Power pop, rock
- Label: Alias

Professional ratings
Review scores
Source	Rating
AllMusic	4.5/5 stars

The Real Underground is a compilation of out-of-print and previously unreleased recordings by Tommy Keene. It was released on CD in 1993 by Alias Records (catalog #A-045).

== Track listing ==
All songs written by Tommy Keene, except where noted

1. "Places That Are Gone" – 3:55
2. "Nothing Happened Yesterday" – 3:57
3. "Baby Face" – 3:35
4. "Back to Zero Now" – 3:05
5. "When the Truth Is Found" – 3:04
6. "Hey! Little Child" – 3:16 (Alex Chilton)
  - Originally recorded by Alex Chilton, 1980
7. "Something Got a Hold of Me" – 3:24
8. "The Real Underground" – 3:50
9. "Misunderstood" – 2:58
10. "That You Do" – 3:22
11. "Mr. Roland" – 5:39
12. "Back Again (Try)" – 4:04
13. "Safe in the Light" – 3:50
14. "People With Fast Cars Drive Fast" – :56
15. "Love Is the Only Thing That Matters" – 2:33
16. "Dull Afternoon" – 1:43
17. "Tattoo" – 2:57 (Pete Townshend)
  - Originally recorded by The Who, 1967
18. "Don't Sleep in the Daytime" – 3:21
19. "Hey Man" – 1:41
20. "Andrea" – 3:17
21. "Something to Rave About" – 2:44
22. "Shake Some Action" – 4:31 (Cyril Jordan, Chris Wilson)
  - Originally recorded by Flamin' Groovies, 1976
23. "Sleeping on a Rollercoaster" – 3:34

== Personnel ==
=== The band ===
- Tommy Keene — Vocals, lead guitar, keyboards
- Ted Nicely — Bass guitar ("Places That Are Gone", "Nothing Happened Yesterday", "Baby Face", "Back to Zero Now", "When the Truth Is Found", "Hey! Little Child", "Something Got a Hold of Me", "The Real Underground", "Misunderstood", "That You Do", "Mr. Roland", "Back Again (Try)", "Safe in the Light", "People With Fast Cars Drive Fast", "Love Is the Only Thing That Matters", "Dull Afternoon")
- Billy Connelly — Guitar, back-up vocals ("Places That Are Gone", "Nothing Happened Yesterday", "Baby Face", "Back to Zero Now", "When the Truth Is Found", "Hey! Little Child", "Something Got a Hold of Me", "The Real Underground", "Misunderstood", "That You Do", "Mr. Roland", "Back Again (Try)", "Safe in the Light")
- Doug Tull — Drums ("Places That Are Gone", "Nothing Happened Yesterday", "Baby Face", "Back to Zero Now", "When the Truth Is Found", "Hey! Little Child", "Something Got a Hold of Me", "The Real Underground", "Misunderstood", "That You Do", "Mr. Roland", "Back Again (Try)", "Safe in the Light", "People With Fast Cars Drive Fast", "Love Is the Only Thing That Matters")
- Brad Quinn — Bass guitar, back-up vocals ("Hey Man", "Andrea", "Something to Rave About", "Shake Some Action", "Sleeping on a Rollercoaster")
- John Richardson — Drums ("Hey Man", "Andrea", "Something to Rave About", "Shake Some Action", "Sleeping on a Rollercoaster")

=== Additional musicians ===
- Justin Hibbard — Lead guitar ("Hey Man"), rhythm guitar ("Something to Rave About", "Sleeping on a Rollercoaster")
- Eric Peterson — Lead guitar ("Andrea"), 2nd lead break ("Shake Some Action")

=== Production ===
- Tommy Keene — Producer ("Places That Are Gone", "Nothing Happened Yesterday", "Baby Face", "Back to Zero Now", "When the Truth Is Found", "Hey! Little Child", "Something Got a Hold of Me", "The Real Underground", "Misunderstood", "That You Do", "Mr. Roland", "People With Fast Cars Drive Fast", "Love Is the Only Thing That Matters", "Dull Afternoon", "Tattoo", "Don't Sleep in the Daytime", "Hey Man", "Andrea", "Something to Rave About", "Shake Some Action", "Sleeping on a Rollercoaster")
- Ted Nicely — Producer ("Places That Are Gone", "Nothing Happened Yesterday", "Baby Face", "Back to Zero Now", "When the Truth Is Found", "Hey! Little Child", "Something Got a Hold of Me", "The Real Underground", "Misunderstood", "That You Do", "Mr. Roland")
- Steve Carr — Engineer ("Places That Are Gone", "Nothing Happened Yesterday", "Baby Face", "Back to Zero Now", "When the Truth Is Found", "Hey! Little Child", "Something Got a Hold of Me", "The Real Underground", "Misunderstood", "That You Do", "Mr. Roland", "People With Fast Cars Drive Fast", "Love Is the Only Thing That Matters", "Dull Afternoon", "Tattoo", "Don't Sleep in the Daytime", "Hey Man", "Andrea", "Something to Rave About", "Shake Some Action", "Sleeping on a Rollercoaster")
- T-Bone Burnett — Producer ("Back Again (Try)")
- Don Dixon — Producer ("Back Again (Try)", "Safe in the Light")
- Steve Haigler — Engineer ("Back Again (Try)")
- Steve Gronback — Engineer ("Safe in the Light")
- Phil Brown — Mastering

== Additional credits ==
- Recorded at Hit and Run Studios, Rockville, Maryland ("Places That Are Gone", "Nothing Happened Yesterday", "Baby Face", "Back to Zero Now", "When the Truth Is Found", "Hey! Little Child", "Something Got a Hold of Me", "The Real Underground", "Misunderstood", "That You Do", "Mr. Roland", "People With Fast Cars Drive Fast", "Love Is the Only Thing That Matters", "Dull Afternoon", "Tattoo", "Don't Sleep in the Daytime", "Hey Man", "Andrea", "Something to Rave About", "Shake Some Action", "Sleeping on a Rollercoaster")
- Recorded at Reflection, Charlotte, North Carolina ("Back Again (Try)")
- Remixed at TGS Studios, North Carolina ("Safe in the Light")
- Mastered at DigiPrep
- Moki — Cover photo
- Tommy Keene — Photography
- Rick Gershon — Liner notes
- Greg Stata — A.D.
- Ed Morgan — Manager
- "Thanks to Bobby, Ed, Jon, Delight, The Alias Staff, Steve, Brad, Petri, Diane Stata, Mark Kates, Tom Zutaut"

== Sources ==
- CD liner notes
