= Big White Lies =

Studio album by Chris Von Sneidern
- Released: 1994
- Genre: Power pop
- Label: Heyday
- Producer: Chris Von Sneidern

Chris Von Sneidern chronology
Sight & Sound (1993)	Big White Lies (1994)	Go! (1996)

Big White Lies is the second album by the American musician Chris Von Sneidern, released in 1994. He supported the album with a North American tour.

== Production ==
The album was produced by Von Sneidern. "Everything I Own" is a cover of the Bread song. Big White Lies was among the first albums to include CD-ROM liner notes and interactive features; Heyday Records considered the costs to be a better investment than producing a music video.

== Critical reception ==
Professional ratings
Review scores
Source	Rating
AllMusic	4.5/5 stars
MusicHound Rock: The Essential Album Guide	3.5/5 stars
Rolling Stone	3/5 stars

Trouser Press deemed the album "an essential pop treasure from one of the most talented auteurs to come along in ages." The San Francisco Chronicle called the songs "a wealth of lovely melodies, hook-laden harmonies and chiming 12-string guitars."

The Gavin Report stated that the "instantly accessible power pop appeals to ... ears in the same way Big Star or the Beatles do." Rolling Stone labeled the album "fun," and wrote that "among the better tracks are 'Mindreader', 'On My Hands', 'Dream Away' and the title track."

AllMusic wrote: "Not quite powerful enough to fall cleanly into the 'power pop' camp, the songs lean more to the spectrum's lush, highbrow end, with elegant guitar lines, soaring harmonies, and occasional use of organ, strings, and French horn."

In 2003, PopMatters noted that, "to this day, many cite his hook- and harmony-filled 1994 release Big White Lies as the quintessential power pop album." John Borack, in 2007's Shake Some Action – The Ultimate Guide to Power Pop, listed Big White Lies as the sixth best power pop album of all time.

== Track listing ==
No.	Title	Length
1.	"Without a Prayer"
2.	"Mindreader"
3.	"On My Hands"
4.	"Hard Again"
5.	"Big White Lies"
6.	"Dream Away"
7.	"Here I Go"
8.	"Doctor"
9.	"Inside Outside"
10.	"Roll On"
11.	"Summertime Sun"
12.	"Everything I Own"
