= John Carlucci =

American musician

John Carlucci is a musician who lives in Los Angeles. He is known for his contributions to power pop and garage rock music.

== Biography ==
John Carlucci began his musical career in Queens, New York, where he played bass for a power pop band called The Speedies. Formed in the late 1970s. one of their singles, "Let Me Take Your Photo," became an underground hit and was rediscovered in 2004 when it was featured in a Hewlett Packard television commercial. This renewed interest in the band led to the song being used as a musical lead-in for Jay Leno's "Photo Booth" skit on The Tonight Show. Around the same time, a previously unreleased The Speedies LP, featuring remastered tracks and additional material, was issued by Radio Heartbeat Records.

After relocating to Los Angeles, Carlucci joined the garage rock band The Fuzztones. Known for their psychedelic and garage rock influences, The Fuzztones signed a deal with RCA Records and recorded their second full-length album, In Heat, in 1989. Carlucci played bass on the album. He toured extensively with the group across Europe, performing at major venues and festivals.https://www.allmusic.com/album/in-heat-mw0000201122

In 2019, Carlucci co-founded The Overdrive Five, a high-energy rock group, alongside guitarist Elan Portnoy (formerly of The Fuzztones), drummer Ira Elliot (of Nada Surf), and vocalist Sam Steinig (of Mondo Topless). The band combines elements of garage rock, power pop, and classic rock 'n' roll.

Beyond his work as a performer, Carlucci has also been involved in mentoring young musicians and producing records for emerging bands.
