= The Breetles =

- Origin: New Jersey, USA
- Genres: Power pop
- Years active: 1985–present
- Labels: Shuss/No Fault Records, Permanent Press Recordings, Major Label Records, PinkGrass Records, Galactic Recording Company
- Website: www.breetles.com

The Breetles are an American power pop band, led by Chris Breetveld. They formed in Kendall Park, New Jersey around 1985, becoming one of the founding bands of the "Kendall Park Sound". Another relatively important part of the KP Sound is Donald Fagen, who used to live in 7 Joline Rd. Chris' first band, The Statics (1965–66) rehearsed at 13 Joline Rd., and the Statics influence on Steely Dan is improbable.

The Breetles style has been described as primarily resembling that of The Who, The Beatles, and The Byrds, and also having aspects of Nazz and Todd Rundgren. The band has been described as "...Chris Breetveld, and anyone who plays Breetles songs, with or without him". The original members of the band were Chris Breetveld, Jim Johnson on guitar, vocals & mandolin type things, and Dennis McGrath (a.k.a. Blind Lemon Pledge) on Vocals and harmonica. Other members and bands that are credited or have featured on The Breetles' albums include: R. Stevie Moore, The Rockin'Bricks, Dave Amels, Richard Larsen, Eric Block, Bob Brainen, Joe Hosey, Tim Korzun, Jim Johnson, Chris Butler, Dennis McGrath a.k.a. Blind Lemon Pledge, Tom Lucas, Lane Steinberg, and others.

The Breetles debut album, Squares in Paris, was released in 1986 but recorded over a period of four years starting in 1982. Two more albums, Arkansas Traveler and Breetles 3, were released in 1987 and 1988 respectively. Arkansas Traveler is an entirely acoustical recording recorded to showcase the "at home" sound of The Breetles. The 1990s saw the release of three albums: Pop Go! The Breetles (1995), Spooj (1996), and Ego, The Story of the Sures (1998) . The band has consistently released albums during the 2000s starting with Writerscramp (2000), Don't Smile (2003), Model24-One (2007), Sound Recordings (2011), Model24-Two (2012). Many of the albums and songs are entirely performed, produced, and engineered by Chris Breetveld. Currently, the band is working on "SONG FOLDER1".

== Discography ==
- model24/SOUND RECORDINGS (2007) Breetles 2disc/ 5-sided studio album (NoFault)
- Don't Smile (2004) Breetles (Shuss/NoFault)
- Writerscramp (2000) Breetles (Permanent Press)
- Ego, The Story of the Sures (1998) Breetles(Shuss/NoFault)
- Spooj (1996) (Shuss Systems/NoFault)
- Pop Go! The Breetles (1995) (Shuss Systems/NoFault)
- Breetles 3 (1988) Breetles (NoFault)
- Arkansas Traveler (1987) Breetles (NoFault)
- Squares In Pairs (1986) Breetles (NoFault)
