= Cavedogs =

American power pop band

- Origin: Boston, Massachusetts
- Genres: Power pop
- Years active: 1986–1992
- Labels: Restless, Enigma, Capitol
- Members: Mark Rivers; Todd Spahr; Brian Stevens
- Website: Official website

The Cavedogs were a power pop band formed in Boston during the mid-1980s. The band featured Brian Stevens (bass/vocals), Todd Spahr (guitar/vocals) and Mark Rivers (drums/vocals). The trio broke up in the early 1990s, but reunited for several shows in 2001–2002, 2010, the WMBR Pipeline! 25th anniversary festival in 2014, the 2015 Hot Stove Cool Music benefit, and most recently at the Burren Back Room Series in March 2024. They are opening for Letters to Cleo in November 2025, for a show at the Bowery Ballroom in New York City and two shows at the Paradise in Boston.

The Cavedogs were known for their energetic live shows, well-crafted power-pop, skillful playing, and three-part harmonies. The band displayed a collective sense of humor on stage, as well as featuring the comedy troupe Cross Comedy (with David Cross) before and during shows. Performances usually ended with covers such as the Beatles' "Tomorrow Never Knows" or the Who's "A Quick One While He's Away".

The Cavedogs released the album Joy Rides for Shut-Ins in 1990, the EP Six Tender Moments in 1991 and the album Soul Martini in 1992. The band members went on to record as solo artists and as members of other bands after the breakup.

== History ==
The Cavedogs were originally formed by Brian Stevens (Bass/Vocals), Todd Spahr (Guitar/Vocals), and Mark Rivers (Drums/Vocals), at the Miami University in Ohio in the early 1980s. Stevens and Spahr performed with a number of local musicians before moving to Boston, where they were joined by drummer Fred Entente who came to be known as "The Blame". However, Entente left the band and was replaced by Mark Rivers, a Rush-influenced drummer from Georgia.

The band had moderate success with early radio tapes such as "Tayter Country", and "Leave Me Alone", as well as an independently released 7" single "Step Down" b/w "Proud Land", but a later tape, "Baba Ganooj", exploded on local Boston Radio. In 1989, the Cavedogs signed to Enigma Records, a subsidiary of Capitol Records. Their first release on Enigma (via Enigma subsidiary Restless Records) was the "Tayter Country" EP. This was followed in short order by the Ed Stasium produced "Joy Rides For Shut Ins", which was hailed as a pop masterpiece. "Joy Rides" did not chart, although it helped put the Cavedogs on the map for the record-buying public. Following the release of "Joy Rides," the band toured with The Dead Milkmen and Mojo Nixon. Other tours followed, including stints with The Connells and The Charlatans.

In 1991, between albums, Capitol Records released the "Six Tender Moments" EP, containing most of the previously released "Tayter Country" EP along with a couple of songs recorded live for radio.

The Cavedogs afterwards embarked on producing "Soul Martini" with the producer Michael Beinhorn. This recording was plagued by friction between Stevens, Beinhorn, Rivers and Spahr, mostly over their contrasting sensibilities: Stevens was more pop-influenced than the harder Spahr and Rivers. Their first released single was the Rivers-penned "Boy In A Plastic Bubble," which fared well, with some MTV rotation. During this time The Cavedogs toured with Dramarama and The Replacements.

As The Cavedogs were about to release "Love Grenade" as the second single from "Soul Martini", Capitol dropped the band, which led to their disintegration. The band members went on to record in other bands and as solo artists after the breakup.

=== Post-breakup projects ===
After the Cavedogs breakup, Brian Stevens toured with Aimee Mann and recorded "Prettier Than You" with producer Jon Lupfer, Jon Brion, Dave Gregory of XTC, Merrie Amsterburg and Pete Linton of The Natives, Milt Sutton, Roberto Toledo, Clayton Scoble of The Aimee Mann Band, and Clarinetist Mark Lowenstein. After performing locally for a couple of years, Brian Stevens left the music business but he is still compiling demos. Todd Spahr formed "Meringue" with Mark Rivers, which released the single "Drunk and Quartered". Spahr then went on to form the Gravy with Glenn Foster Brown of Evol Twin, Mike Jordan of the Ken Chambers Band, and a revolving cast of drummers. The Gravy released an LP, "Hangman's Pop", recorded and produced by Glenn Foster Brown, and an EP titled "The Hollywood EP". Recently, Spahr has been involved in a Swedish pop band/Web show, "Spahrhusen". Rivers formed Poundcake with Clayton Scoble and Josh Lattanzi after the dissolution of Meringue, and they released one album, "Aloha Via Satellite", before Rivers left the scene. From 2009 to 2015, Mark Rivers appeared in the NBC sitcom Parks and Recreation as Rivers, the drummer for Andy Dwyer's fictional band, Mouse Rat. Since 2017, he has worked on the Netflix series Big Mouth, writing the original songs heard during many episodes.

The Cavedogs reunited for performances in 2001, 2002, 2010, in the fall of 2014 as part of the 50 Years of Boston Rock Festival, celebrated by Pipeline, a radio show on WMBR 88.1 FM, and at the Burren in Somerville in March 2024. They are scheduled to open for Letters to Cleo for three upcoming shows in New York City and Boston in November 2025.

== Discography ==
=== Studio albums ===
- Joy Rides for Shut-Ins (1990)
- Soul Martini (1992)

=== EPs ===
- Six Tender Moments (1991)

=== Compilations ===
- Fall Back In It (2002)
- Rock Turns to Stone(1988)

=== Singles ===
Year	Title	Chart positions				Album
Year	Title	US Hot 100	US Modern Rock	US Mainstream Rock	UK	Album
1990	"Leave Me Alone"	–	17	–	–	Joyrides for Shut-Ins
