= The Mayflies USA =

American power pop band

- Origin: Chapel Hill, North Carolina, United States
- Genres: Power pop
- Years active: 1997–present
- Labels: Yep Roc Records
- Members: Matt McMichaels; Adam Price; Matt Long; Tony Stiglitz; David Liesegang (former)

The Mayflies USA are a Chapel Hill, North Carolina–based rock band signed to Yep Roc Records. The band is a classic example of power pop, as their songs featured catchy melodies, vocal harmonies, and prominent guitar riffs. Their style was influenced by older bands such as The Beatles, Big Star, and also more contemporary groups like Teenage Fanclub and Velvet Crush.

== History ==
The band released their debut EP in 1997, and their next three albums were released by Yep Roc. North Carolina producer Chris Stamey (formerly of The dB's, and credited by the band as the "fifth" Mayfly) produced their first two records for Yep Roc, Summertown and The Pity List.

Spin Magazine called the band's "borderline breakout" debut album Summertown "r-o-c-k like they don't make anymore, in love with early Eagles and Bob Welch, in bed with Wilco but dreaming of the Replacements and Pure Prairie League and proud of it."

Keith Cleversley, who produced The Flaming Lips and Mercury Rev, worked on their 2002 record Walking in a Straight Line. The band's albums garnered favorable reviews in publications such as The Washington Post, Spin, The Village Voice, Allmusic and The Boston Phoenix.

At the time The Mayflies USA were, according to Pitchfork, "the new national buzz-band most likely to carry the torch" for Chapel Hill rock music, with a "sleek, soaring sound [that] almost seemed like a repudiation of their squalling predecessors." Burned out after years of touring, the band went on hiatus after a final show at SXSW in 2003.

The band reunited for some shows through the years, and on May 16, 2012, Billboard Magazine announced the band would reunite for Yep Roc Records' 15 Year Anniversary celebration. Guitarist Matt McMichaels went on to form Surrender Human with bassist Robert Sledge and drummer Tony Stiglitz, and was a core member in Chris Stamey's Big Star Third project with Mike Mills, Jody Stephens, and Mitch Easter. Guitarist Matt Long moved to New York City and started The Library, a Brooklyn-based band that has released three albums, and has worked as production coordinator on projects for Keith Richards. Bassist Adam Price has written two critically acclaimed novels, The Grand Tour (Doubleday, 2016) and The Hotel Neversink (Tin House Books, 2019).

On August 21, 2012, Yep Roc reissued Summertown, this time on vinyl.

During the height of the Covid pandemic in 2020, The band reunited to record a song for "Cover Charge," a benefit album for beloved local venue Cat's Cradle that also featured tracks from local luminaries like Superchunk, The Mountain Goats, and Iron & Wine. Pitchfork described The Mayflies' contribution to the album (a cover of The Smiths' "There Is a Light that Never Goes Out") as sounding like "a handshake across the decades."

The band soon went into the studio with producer Tim Harper. On January 6, 2025 The Mayflies USA released their first new music in over 20 years, the single "Calling The Bad Ones Home," which Brooklyn Vegan called "a lovely two-minute power-pop earworm. They haven't lost their touch." "Calling The Bad Ones Home"-- "the best Teenage Fanclub song of the year" according to Norwegian music website Popklikk--was also the first Mayflies song to feature drummer Tony Stiglitz.

On February 18, 2025, the band released the single "Thought The Rain Was Gone" The song was the first official single from their upcoming release Kickless Kids, the band's first new album in 23 years. The single "Less Lost," featuring original drummer David Liesegang, came out on March 25, 2025. "Cabbagetown," the fourth single from Kickless Kids, was released on April 22, 2025. The final single, "Kickless Kids," was released to streaming platforms on May 13, 2025.

The Kickless Kids album was released worldwide by Yep Roc Records on May 16, 2025 to streaming services and on limited edition peach vinyl and CD. Glide Magazine called Kickless Kids "a fantastic collection of power pop, crammed with memorable choruses, beautiful melodies, and infectious jangly guitars. You’d have to go back to R.E.M. to find a Southern band that can play power pop with such an effortless style." In their year-end review, radio station WCHL called Kickless Kids '[t]he comeback story of the year" and "easily one of the best we heard in ‘25."

== Discography ==
Year	Title	Label
1997	The Mayflies USA	Clancy
1999	Summertown	Yep Roc
2000	The Pity List	Yep Roc
2002	Walking in a Straight Line	Yep Roc
2025	Kickless Kids	Yep Roc
