= Chris Von Sneidern =

American singer-songwriter

- Also known as: CvS
- Born: Christopher John Von Sneidern; December 1965 (age 60); Syracuse, New York, U.S.
- Genres: Power pop, Soul, R&B
- Occupation: Singer-songwriter
- Instruments: Guitar, bass, vocal
- Years active: 1980–present
- Labels: Heyday; Mastromonia; LoveCat Music
- Website: cvsmusic.com

Chris Von Sneidern (born in Syracuse, New York) is an American singer-songwriter. He earned a cult following with a string of indie releases during the 1990s and 2000s.

== Career ==
Von Sneidern played in a local band called the U-Turns in the early 1980s before relocating to San Francisco in 1985. In the Bay Area he played with several locally based power pop bands, including the Lost Patrol and The Sneetches (the latter as bassist), before joining Flying Color as guitarist in 1987. After Flying Color broke up in 1990, Von Sneidern hit the road with former Beat leader Paul Collins and lived for a short time in New York before returning to San Francisco to pursue a solo career. In 2017, he toured with the Flamin' Groovies as their bassist in support of their reunion album, Fantastic Plastic.(von Sneidern left the Groovies in September 2023)

Von Sneidern issued his self-produced debut album, Sight & Sound, on the Heyday label in 1993. In addition to winning rave reviews from power pop fans, it also featured a guest appearance from John Wesley Harding, with whom von Sneidern would collaborate frequently in the years to come. The follow-up, Big White Lies, appeared in 1994, and as word of Von Sneidern's music spread in the pop underground, he picked up more production work in addition to his own recordings, and opened his own Bay Area recording studio.

When von Sneidern released his third album, Go!, in 1996, he was on the local indie label Mod Lang; that label also released the follow-up, 1998's Wood + Wire. For his next project, von Sneidern formed a soul/R&B-influenced outfit called the Sportsmen, which also featured pianist Khoi-San, guitarist Dave "Shaggy" Gleason, bassist Teenage Rob and drummer Derek Ritchie. Their debut album, Spirited, was released by the Japanese Lazy Cat label in 1999. Von Sneidern subsequently formed his own label, which allowed him to release several idiosyncratic projects in 2000. First among these was London Payne (subtitled Searching the Muse: Memoirs Across America), which set poetry by John R. Dykes to music; it was followed by 2-cute 2-be 4-gotten, a similar exercise that drew from poetry written by teenage girls. Finally, there was an additional live album spanning 1998–2000, Live Start Lifting. In a 2001 episode of SpongeBob SquarePants called "Wormy", he sings the song, "That's What Friends Do."

== In popular culture ==
- A documentary titled Why isn't Chris Von Sneidern famous? was produced.
