= The Wellingtons =

Australian band

- Origin: Melbourne, Victoria, Australia
- Genres: Power pop, pop, rock
- Years active: 2005–present
- Labels: This Time Records (Japan), Lojinx (United Kingdom), Rock Indiana (Spain), Zip (USA)
- Members: Zac Anthony; Kate Goldby; Koji Asano; Anna Dobbyn; David Noordhoff
- Website: Official website

The Wellingtons are an Australian power pop band from Melbourne. The band has released four albums, including Keeping Up With The Wellingtons (2005), For Friends in Far Away Places (2006), Heading North For the Winter (2008) and In Transit (2011).

The band's 2006 album, For Friends in Faraway Places, received a 3.5-star rating from AllMusic.

== Line up ==
The current band line-up is:

- Zac Anthony - guitar and vocals
- Kate Goldby - bass guitar and vocals
- Koji Asano/Luke Godeassi - guitar and vocals
- Anna Dobbyn - keyboards
- David Noordhoff - drums

Past members include Steph Hughes, Matt Kulesza, Steve Thomas, Lee Daniel, Amy Walters, Tosh Sanada, and David Kleynjans,

== Early releases ==
Following the release of Keeping Up With The Wellingtons in 2005, the band toured the United States. This provided strong sales of the debut album in Japan (through imported sales from Australia) and consequently, Japanese label This Time Records signed the band for the release of the album. This led to the band's first Japanese tour in 2006.

Songs from the first album were used in US channel CBS's show How I Met Your Mother and in a variety of Japanese television commercials.

== Further releases ==
The band's second album, For Friends in Far Away Places followed in 2006, again being released first in Japan and in Australia a few months later.

2008's Heading North for the Winter was again released in Japan first on (ThisTime Records) and was subsequently released in Spain (Rock Indiana), the UK (Lojinx), the US (Zip Records) and Australia (Dust Devil Music).

Their fourth album In Transit was released in Japan (ThisTime Records) in July 2011 and was scheduled to be released in Spain (Rock Indiana) and the US (Zip Records) in September/October 2011, with an Australian release to be confirmed. In support of this album, the band will commence a five-week tour of Japan, Spain, Italy, the UK and the US in September 2011.

The band's biggest songwriting influences include Weezer, Elvis Costello, Cheap Trick, Ben Folds, The Lemonheads and Fountains Of Wayne.

== Discography ==
=== Studio albums ===
- 2005: Keeping Up With The Wellingtons
- 2006: For Friends In Far Away Places
- 2008: Heading North For The Winter
- 2011: In Transit
- 2012: Hey Hey (EP)
- 2017: End Of The Summer
- 2025: Baby Moon
