= 20/20 (band) =

American power pop band

- Origin: Tulsa, Oklahoma
- Genres: Power pop
- Years active: c.1977–1983, 1995–2005
- Labels: Bomp!, Portrait, Enigma, Oglio
- Members: Steve Allen; Ron Flynt
- Past members: Mike Gallo; Chris Silagyi; Joel Turrisi; Dean Korth

20/20 was an American power pop band based in Hollywood, California. They were active from 1977 to 1983 and reunited during the mid-1990s to the late 1990s. In the mid-1970s, Steve Allen and Ron Flynt played together in Tulsa. Allen and Flynt were graduates of Nathan Hale High School, and both attended Oklahoma State University, where Flynt earned a degree in music. Allen decided to move to Los Angeles in 1977 after fellow Tulsa natives Phil Seymour and Dwight Twilley met with success. Once in Los Angeles, Allen met with Mike Gallo (singer/songwriter/keyboardist/drummer), who had already conceived of the idea and name for the band (after having spent time in the UK). Gallo first started writing with Allen, and later auditioned Allen's friend from Tulsa, Ron Flynt, for 20/20. The three-piece band signed with Greg Shaw's Bomp! Records in 1978 to record a single. Between the release of the single, and their first LP on Portrait Records, Chris Silagyi joined the band as a keyboardist.

== Personnel ==
- Steve Allen – guitar, vocals
- Ron Flynt – bass, vocals
- Mike Gallo – drums (1977–1979)
- Chris Silagyi – keyboards, guitar, vocals (1979–1981)
- Joel Turrisi – drums (1979–1981)
- Dean Korth - drums (1981–1983)
- Bill Belknap – drums (1983–1984, 1995–2005)

== Personnel changes and break-up ==
During the recording of the first album, Gallo was let go from the band. Phil Seymour played drums on all of the album's songs except one. Afterwards Joel Turrisi joined and played on Look Out!, their second album. The third album, Sex Trap, was recorded with drummer Dean Korth and released on Mainway Records, followed by a later release on Enigma Records. 20/20 then split up.

Flynt moved to Austin, opened his own recording studio, and headlined the 2005 Austin music festival with a newly released CD on Zip records including the powerpop tune "Mary's World". Steve Allen moved to Nashville, Tennessee and continued to record and write music there. Chris Silagyi became a record (The Untouchables, Dave Alvin, The Redskins) and video producer. Joel Turrisi became an actor and works in other areas of film & music. After splitting with 20/20 in late 1979 (and taking twenty unreleased/recorded 20/20 songs, which he is the sole writer, with him) Mike Gallo went on to form the bands RadioMusic and Two Moons, and signed a publishing deal with Warner/Chappell.

== Current activities ==
Five band members now operate five different recording studios in five different cities.
Ron Flynt - Jumping Dog Studio in Austin, Texas. Headlined the 2005 Austin music festival, and released a solo album on Zip Records with such tunes as the power-pop track "Mary's World".
Steve Allen - Blue Planet Studio in Nashville, Tennessee. Currently plays with The Long Players band.
Chris Silagyi - PlayBox Music Room in Pinon Pines, CA. Also became a record (The Untouchables, Dave Alvin, The Redskins) and video producer. He currently plays with The Ex Teens.
Bill Belknap - Long Branch Studio in Tulsa, Oklahoma.
Joel Turrisi - VFG Productions/Panaview filters in West Hollywood CA. Works in acting and other film/music areas.
Mike Gallo - Opened his own label, Two Moons Records, in 2008 to release his catalog (previously unreleased 20/20 recordings, and Gallo's two post-20/20 bands, RadioMusic and Two Moons). He writes and records at home, and also signed a publishing deal with Warner/Chappell. Mike is currently focused on songwriting, his label and publishing.
Dean Korth - Currently plays with the band The Catalina Scramblers in Santa Cruz, CA.

== Discography ==
=== Albums ===
Year	Title	Billboard 200 Peak	Record label	Comments
1979	20/20	138	Portrait Records	
1981	Look Out!	127	Portrait Records	
1982	Sex Trap	—	Mainway Records	
1983	Sex Trap	—	Enigma Records	Enigma records picked up the album for wider distribution, but "Sex Trap" and "Fast Car" were remixed, and "Please Please (Listen To Me)" was replaced by "Jack's Got a Problem."
1995	20/20/Look Out!	—	Oglio Records	First two LP's, 20/20 and Look Out! remastered and released on one CD. Now out of print and commercially unavailable. A later edition includes two non-LP B-sides from the Look Out! era.
1995	4 Day Tornado	—	Oglio Records	
1998	Interstate	—	Oglio Records	
1999	Sex Trap	—	Japanese release	Includes bonus track, "Best of Your Life."
2025	Back To California	—	SpyderPop Records	

=== Singles ===
- 1978: "Giving It All" b/w "Under the Freeway" (Bomp! Records)
- 1979: "Tell Me Why" b/w "Yellow Pills" (Epic/Portrait Records)
- 1979: "Cheri" b/w "Backyard Guys" (Epic/Portrait Records)
- 1981: "Strange Side of Love" b/w "People in Your Life"/"Child's Play"
- 1983: "Jack's Got a Problem" b/w "Haunted People Go" (Line Records) Germany only release
- 2008: "Going Up with My Girl" b/w "World of Fools" (Radio Heartbeat) previously unreleased vintage tracks

=== Appearances on compilations ===
- 1978: "Giving It All" The Best of Bomp Volume One (Bomp! Records)
- 1979: "Giving It All", "Drive" Who Put The Bomp? (London Records) UK only release
- 1979: "Drive" Waves Anthology Vol. 1 (Bomp! Records)
- 1979: "Under The Freeway" Yesterday's Sound Today (Line Records) Germany only release
- 1980: "Tell Me Why" Rock 80 (CBS) Scandinavia only release
- 1981: "Nuclear Boy" New Rock (CBS Records) Greece only release
- 1986: "Jack's Got A Problem" Der Sampler 7 (Line Records) Germany only release
- 1992: "Giving It All" From L.A. With Love (Marilyn Records) France only release
- 1993: "Song of the Universe" Yellow Pills Volume One (Big Deal Records)
- 1993: "Giving It All", "Yellow Pills" Shake It Up! – American Power Pop II (1978–80) (Rhino Records)
- 1993: "Yellow Pills" Richard Blade's Flashback Favorites Volume 3 (Sony)
- 1994: "Nothing At All", "Watching The Headlights Burn" Yellow Pills - More Of The Best Of American Pop! Volume 2 (Big Deal)
- 1994: "Giving It All" Destination Bomp (Bomp! Records)
- 1995: "Remember the Lightning" Into the Anxious 80's (Risky Business)
- 1996: "Drive", "Screaming", "Under the Freeway" The Roots of Powerpop (Bomp! Records)
- 1997: "Day After Day" Come and Get It: A Tribute to Badfinger (Copper Records)
- 1997: "Yellow Pills" Poptopia! Power Pop Classics Of The '70s (Rhino Records)
- 2002: "Yellow Pills" New Wave Hits Of The 70's & 80's (Sony Music)
- 2005: "Yellow Pills" 20 Greats From The Golden Decade Of Power Pop (Varèse Sarabande)
- 2010: "I Can't Stand It" American Velvet Vol. 1: A Tribute To The Velvet Underground (Darla Records)
