= Welcome Interstate Managers =

Studio album by Fountains of Wayne
- Released: June 10, 2003
- Recorded: 2001–2002
- Studios: Stratosphere Sound, New York City, New York; Q Division, Somerville, Massachusetts; The Clubhouse, Rhinebeck, New York
- Genres: Alternative rock; power pop; geek rock
- Length: 55:08
- Labels: S-Curve; Virgin
- Producers: Adam Schlesinger; Chris Collingwood; Mike Denneen

Fountains of Wayne chronology
| Utopia Parkway (1999) | Welcome Interstate Managers (2003) | Out-of-State Plates (2005) |

Singles from Welcome Interstate Managers
- 1. "Stacy's Mom" Released: May 19, 2003; 2. "Mexican Wine" Released: January 20, 2004; 3. "Hey Julie" Released: September 6, 2004

Welcome Interstate Managers is the third studio album by the American rock band Fountains of Wayne. It was released by S-Curve Records on June 10, 2003. The album garnered the band breakthrough success into the mainstream, containing the power pop single "Stacy's Mom," which reached number 21 on the US Billboard Hot 100, becoming the band's highest-charting hit in the United States. Two more singles were released from the album: "Mexican Wine" and "Hey Julie".

The album peaked at number 115 on the Billboard 200, selling 8,401 copies in its first week, the highest scanned week in the band's history. It also reached number one on the US Heatseekers Albums chart and ultimately sold 187,000 copies in the United States.

== Background ==
Fountains of Wayne was at a low point following the under-performance of 1999's Utopia Parkway, which led to them getting dropped by their then-label, Atlantic Records. The period when they were without a label was particularly hard on lead singer and co-songwriter Chris Collingwood. According to bassist and co-songwriter Adam Schlesinger in 2005,

"I think Chris felt especially bummed during that whole period. He just sort of felt that we worked for a really long time and it didn't really add up to anything. And it didn't seem like the future had much in the way of promise. Chris wasn't writing a lot. I don't know if it was the whole thing of being in between labels but more just the whole thing of putting all that time into it and feeling it tapering off."

Eventually Schlesinger convinced Collingwood to start writing and recording "because it was the only way that I could get Chris to want to be a part of it. I was just like, 'Hey look, let's just go in and do like we have always done when we were 18. If we have a song we like, we'll just record it and eventually we'll see if we have an album'." By mid-2001, Fountains of Wayne had discussed plans for a new album.

Meanwhile, the band got in touch with several prospective labels, but balked at their insistence that the band record demos for consideration to be signed. According to Schlesinger, "We talked to a bunch of record companies before we had anything recorded. And everybody was like, 'Well we really like your band but we need to hear what you're working on. Do you have any demos or anything?' And we didn't want to make demos. We just found that kind of demeaning. But we were sort of at the point where we could have gone and made demos. And it was like, you know, for God's sake we've been doing this so long, we're not going to make a demo tape. We're just gonna go make a record and that's what we did."

== Composition ==
Welcome Interstate Managers is described as a power pop album, which Schlesinger stated, "We just try to write songs that have interesting melodies. And just the emphasis on melody at all automatically puts you in the power-pop category. So anything that's kind of melodic and comes from that Beatles lineage gets put into that power-pop box ... We like melody and can't help it." He also said the band wanted to try "different things" instead of making an album "that was all kind of the same thing," with a goal to "make a very varied record." The album's lead single "Stacy's Mom" and second track "Bright Future in Sales" are regarded as power pop tracks, the latter is about a self-sabotaging but optimistic salesman. "Valley Winter Song", "Hackensack" and "Hey Julie" are described as acoustic tracks, with its lyrics focusing on intimacy. The band experiments with '60s psychedelia on the tracks, "No Better Place" and "Supercollider". They also experiment with country music on "Hung Up on You" and "Halley's Waitress" is described as a piano ballad.

== Recording ==
With no label support, Welcome Interstate Managers was recorded with Fountains of Wayne covering all expenses themselves. According to drummer Brian Young, "Adam put up the money to do the recording, we converged in a studio in upstate New York, and we didn’t know what to expect. We all showed up with basically nothing. I had a stick bag, and the engineer mentioned to me, 'You know, it would’ve been a lot cooler if you showed up with nothing at all.' We were kind of going through the studio basement, looking for gear and taping stands together. It was funny."

Once the album was finished, Fountains of Wayne signed to S-Curve Records, whose executive vice president, Steve Yegelwel, had first signed the band when he was working as an A&R at Atlantic Records. Prior to the album's release, the band went on tour in November 2002 to road test the new material and build up fan anticipation for the new record.

== Release ==
The lead single, "Stacy's Mom", was released on May 20, 2003, to popular and critical success. The song peaked at number 21 on the Billboard Hot 100 and was certified Gold by the Recording Industry Association of America (RIAA) for shipments of 500,000 copies. By July 2011, the song has sold 888,000 copies in the United States. The album's second single, "Mexican Wine", was released in the United States on January 20, 2004. It was later released in Europe on May 17. The third and final single, "Hey Julie", was released on September 6, 2004. It peaked at number 57 on the UK Singles Chart.

"Valley Winter Song" was used in a 2008 L.L. Bean Commercial.

The album was first pressed to vinyl for Record Store Day Black Friday in a limited run in 2020.

== Promotion ==
In March 2003, the band announced that Welcome Interstate Managers would be released in June. The group embarked on a US tour in the summer of 2003, in support of the album. Released in the United Kingdom on September 15, 2003, the band performed two shows in the country, as well as an additional concert in Scotland, from February 29 to March 3, 2004. The band continued touring in 2004, across Europe in March, before returning to the US for a spring tour in April.

== Reception and legacy ==
Professional ratings
Aggregate scores
| Source | Rating |
|---|---|
| Metacritic | 86/100 |
Review scores
| Source | Rating |
| AllMusic | 4/5 stars |
| Blender | 5/5 stars |
| Entertainment Weekly | A− |
| Mojo | 4/5 stars |
| Pitchfork | 7.5/10 |
| Q | 4/5 stars |
| Rolling Stone | 3/5 stars |
| The Rolling Stone Album Guide | 4/5 stars |
| Spin | A |
| The Village Voice | A− |

The album was met with commercial success and favorable reviews, citing the album's catchy song structures and well-crafted lyrics reflecting struggles of the middle class lifestyle in the American East Coast. Review aggregating website Metacritic reports a weighted average score of 86 out of 100 based on 24 reviews, indicating "universal acclaim".

Mark Vanderhoff of AllMusic stated the album "had more than enough pitch-perfect melodies and smile-inducing lyrics to make it a defining album for the summer of 2003." Keith Phipps of The A.V. Club said, "Undoubtedly there's a great pop song playing beneath the cheers as it happens." Annie Zaleski of Billboard praised the group's "clever lyrical portraits" and stated they expand on their "power pop palette as well, exploring more subdued territory." Paul Clarke of BBC Music gave the album an 8/10 rating, writing, "this is a wonderfully droll pop album that has a number of mini-classics that could quite easily chart in these days when 1000 copies or so will get you into the hit parade. Fountains Of Wayne are back and their contemporaries has better take heed as should you, the record buying public." Sara Lovejoy of Drowned in Sound also gave the album the same score, remarking, "There's nothing new, refreshing or ground breaking about 'Welcome Interstate Managers', and as the tempo drops slightly towards the end, it could have been rapped up on a neat high much earlier on than song 15, but who cares?." Chris Burland of Chart Attack remarked that the album "is high-test grade Ethanol from start to finish; doing for an album other more successful band will struggle for years to match."

Beth Johnson of Entertainment Weekly described the album as "a triple punch of joyously clever power pop." Mark Martelli of Pitchfork said, "Despite its obviously short shelf-life, Welcome Interstate Managers is delicious power-pop, unpretentious, loose and perfect for teenagers driving down to Ocean City for the weekend." Neal Alpert of The Phoenix praised the record, calling it "a solid, playful effort that seems to cast commercial consideration aside." However, he felt the songs "Peace and Love" and "Hey Julie" were not up "to Wayne's usual high standard," as well as describing "Hung Up on You" as "a generic country tune." Jay Milikan of Stylus Magazine rated the album an A− writing, "In addition to the usual blissed-out power pop that we've come to expect from them, Adam Schlesinger and Chris Collingwood branch out to include low-key acoustic numbers, buzzing trad-rock, and even a dollop of country jangling to create what will surely be an enduring classic. The record is sprawling and beautiful, a genuine pop masterpiece through and through." Billy Ho of Sound the Sirens remarked, "This sort of tasteful, yet humongously tongues-firmly-in-cheek persona elevates Welcome Interstate Managers into something great; like the rippling ocean waves caressing the warm sandy beach, a good portion of this album flourishes in fun and sunshine, teeming with seemingly lost optimistic glow." Though the album was well received by most music critics, a review written by Uncut wrote a negative response to the album, stating, "Disappointing return for literate New York quartet [...] The lyrics are sly dissections of US life, but the fizz seems to have flattened [...] here they're diminished by trying to touch too many bases, often lapsing into sub-Oasis stodge."

In 2003, Drowned in Sound staff writer, Sean Adams listed the album as one of the Top 75 Albums of the Year. In later years, the album became widely regarded as the band's best effort and a prime example of early 2000s power pop. On the 20th anniversary of the album, Annie Zaleski of Stereogum wrote, "Musically, Welcome Interstate Managers is also far more earnest and genuine than 'Stacy's Mom' might lead you to believe [...] the album scans like a trip through rock history: the '70s AM Gold trip 'Fire Island'. the boogie-rock epic 'Bright Future In Sales'. the shiny '80s rock radio nod 'No Better Place', punkish power-pop of 'Little Red Light'. This music isn't cheesy, however, or something meant to be a spoof of these genres. The style of each song fit the themes." "Stacy's Mom" was ranked at No. 350 on Blender's "500 Greatest Songs Since You Were Born" and No. 88 on VH1's "100 Greatest Songs of the '00s". "Hackensack" was named one of the "250 Greatest Songs of the 21st Century So Far" by Rolling Stone, listed at No. 123.

== Commercial performance ==
The album debuted on the Billboard 200 at number 150. It sold 8,401 copies its first week, becoming their highest scanned week in the band's history. Later peaking at number 115, the album spent 28 weeks on the chart. By November 2003, the album sold 187,000 copies in the United States. According to Nielsen Soundscan, it has sold 488,000 copies, as of April 2020.

Internationally, the album peaked at number 198 in Australia, number 22 on the Dutch Alternative Albums chart, and number 160 in the UK.

== Covers ==
In 2009, Katy Perry performed a cover of "Hackensack" on MTV Unplugged, which was later released digitally.

In 2011, the band the Wonder Years performed a cover of "Hey Julie" for the charity compilation album, Vs. the Earthquake.

== Track listing ==
All tracks are written by Chris Collingwood and Adam Schlesinger.

| No. | Title | Length |
|---|---|---|
| 1. | "Mexican Wine" | 3:23 |
| 2. | "Bright Future in Sales" | 3:06 |
| 3. | "Stacy's Mom" | 3:18 |
| 4. | "Hackensack" | 3:00 |
| 5. | "No Better Place" | 4:06 |
| 6. | "Valley Winter Song" | 3:35 |
| 7. | "All Kinds of Time" | 4:22 |
| 8. | "Little Red Light" | 3:35 |
| 9. | "Hey Julie" | 2:36 |
| 10. | "Halley's Waitress" | 3:35 |
| 11. | "Hung Up on You" | 4:00 |
| 12. | "Fire Island" | 2:56 |
| 13. | "Peace and Love" | 3:26 |
| 14. | "Bought for a Song" | 4:02 |
| 15. | "Supercollider" | 5:06 |
| 16. | "Yours and Mine" | 1:04 |
| 17. | "Elevator Up" (Japan/Digital/Vinyl Bonus Track) | 4:02 |

== Personnel ==
=== Fountains of Wayne ===
- Chris Collingwood – lead vocals, rhythm guitar, production
- Jody Porter – lead guitar, backing vocals
- Adam Schlesinger – bass, rhythm guitar, synthesizers, backing vocals, production, engineering, mixing on "Bright Future in Sales" and "No Better Place"
- Brian Young – drums, percussion

=== Additional musicians ===
- Ronnie Buttacavoli – trumpet on "Mexican Wine", flugelhorn on "Fire Island"
- James Iha – guitar on "All Kinds of Time"
- Robert Randolph – pedal steel on "Hung Up on You"
- Jen Trynin – backing vocals and guitar on "No Better Place"

=== Technical personnel ===
- Matt Beaudoin – assistant engineering
- Collection of The New-York Historical Society – photography
- Rudyard Lee Cullers – assistant engineering
- Mike Denneen – production, engineering
- Richard Furch – engineering
- John Holbrook – mixing on all tracks, except where noted
- Tom Lord-Alge – mixing on "Mexican Wine" and "Stacy's Mom"
- George Marino – mastering
- Frank Olinsky – art direction and design
- Rafi Sofer – assistant engineering

== Charts ==
Chart performance for Welcome Interstate Managers
| Chart (2003) | Peak position |
|---|---|
| Australian Albums (ARIA) | 198 |
| Dutch Alternative Albums (Dutch Charts) | 22 |
| UK Albums (OCC) | 160 |
| US Billboard 200 | 115 |
| US Heatseekers Albums (Billboard) | 1 |

2020 weekly chart performance
| Chart (2020) | Peak position |
|---|---|
| US Indie Store Album Sales (Billboard) | 20 |

== Release history ==
Release dates and formats for Welcome Interstate Managers
| Region | Date | Format(s) | Label | Ref. |
|---|---|---|---|---|
| United States | June 10, 2003 | CD | S-Curve; Virgin | |
| Various | June 10, 2003 | Digital download | S-Curve; Virgin | |
| United Kingdom | September 15, 2003 | CD | S-Curve; Virgin | |
| Japan | December 2, 2003 | CD | S-Curve; Virgin | |
| Various | May 28, 2021 | LP | Real Gone Music; Virgin | |
