= Myracle Brah =

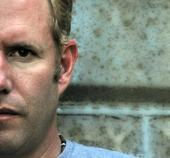

Background information
- Genres: Power pop Indie pop Pop rock

Myracle Brah is an American indie pop/power pop band primarily centered on singer-songwriter Andy Bopp. It is based out of Baltimore, Maryland. The group consists of Bopp, Paul Krysiak (bassist, piano player, and vocalist), Marty Canelli (organist), Joe Parsons (drummer), and Greg Schroeder (drummer). It was previously signed to Universal Music Group.

== History ==
Bopp was a key frontman and primary songwriter of the group Love Nut. He formed Myracle Brah after their label, Interscope Records, dropped the band. Their first album, Life On Planet Eartsnop, was released in 1998. Mojo Magazine named it as one of the best guitar-pop records of the last 10 years. Allmusic gave it 4.5 out of 5 stars and cited it as an "album pick". Reviewer Jason Ankeny commented, "Myracle Brah's debut captures the sound and spirit of the classic power pop era to perfection". Bopp recorded the album in his own bedroom with an eight track, which took place from about November to December 1997.

Despite positive reviews, Life On Planet Eartsnop failed to achieve commercial success in the United States. It sold much better overseas, particularly in Japan. From 2000 to 2004, the group toured in the United States, Canada, Spain, the Netherlands, Germany, and England. The group went on to release eight albums, which did not achieve as much recognition, and most are currently out of print. Some are, however, available digitally. Their 2003 album, Treblemaker, was produced by Dave Nachodsky, at Invisible Sound Studios.

The group has been compared to Badfinger, the Raspberries, and the Beatles. Andy Bopp is currently in the rock band Alto Verde and the country/rockabilly band The Bleaker Street Cowboys.

== Discography ==
Year released	Album title	Compilation
1998	Life On Planet Eartsnop	
1999	Plate Spinner	
2000	Myracle Brah	
2002	Super Automatic	Yes
2002	Bleeder	
2003	Treblemaker	
2006	Translator	Yes
2007	Can You Hear the Myracle Brah?	

== See also ==
- The Pillbugs (labelmates of Myracle Brah)
- List of indie pop artists
