= Off Broadway USA =

American rock band

- Origin: Oak Park, Illinois, U.S.
- Genres: Rock
- Years active: 1977–1983
- Label: Atlantic Records
- Past members: Mimi Betinis; Paul Darrow; Mike Gorman; Ken Harck; Robert Harding; John Ivan; Cliff Johnson; Paul McDermott; John Pazdan; Mike Redmond; Dan Santercola

Off Broadway USA is an American rock band.

== Background ==
The band was founded by Paul Darrow, Cliff Johnson, Paul McDermott, John Pazdan and Dan Santercola in 1977 in Oak Park, Illinois, United States. After several line-up changes including the addition of songwriter/guitarist John Ivan and Robert Harding, plus drummer Ken Harck, the band's debut album On was released by Atlantic Records in 1979. The album reached No. 101 on the Billboard 200 and spawned the single "Stay in Time" which peaked at No. 51 on the Billboard Hot 100 the week of April 26, 1980. Off Broadway released a follow-up album, Quick Turns, on Atlantic Records in 1980 and continued touring for three years before breaking up in 1983.

In early May 1980, "Stay in Time" peaked at number 9 on the weekly music surveys of their hometown radio superstation WLS-AM in Chicago, which gave the song much airplay.

In 2015, Cliff Johnson began touring as Cliff Johnson and The Raine.

The band currently consists of several original On album players.

In July 2022, Cliff Johnson died at age 70.

== Discography ==
=== Albums ===
- On (1979), U.S. No. 101
- Quick Turns (1980), U.S. No. 208
- Fallin' In (1997)
- Live At Fitzgeralds (1998)

=== Singles ===
- "Stay in Time" (1979), U.S. No. 51
- "Bad Indication" (1979)
- "Automatic" (1980)
- "Are You Alone" (1980)
