= Power pop =

Music genre

- Other names: Powerpop
- Stylistic origins: Garage rock; pop rock; hard rock; beat; rockabilly; doo-wop; jangle pop
- Cultural origins: Mid-1960s – early 1970s, United States and United Kingdom

Fusion genres
- Pop-punk

Other topics
- List of albums; list of artists and songs; jangle pop; glam rock; mod revival; pub rock; new wave; neo-psychedelia; college rock

Power pop is a subgenre of rock music and a form of pop rock based on the early music of bands such as the Beach Boys, the Beatles, the Byrds, and the Who. It typically incorporates melodic hooks, vocal harmonies, an energetic performance, and cheerful-sounding music underpinned by a sense of yearning, longing, despair, or self-empowerment. The sound is primarily rooted in pop and rock traditions of the early-to-mid 1960s, although later examples sometimes draw from punk, new wave, glam rock, pub rock, college rock, and neo-psychedelia.

Power pop developed mainly among American musicians who came of age during the mid-1960s British Invasion. The term was coined in 1967 by the Who guitarist and songwriter Pete Townshend to describe his band, the Small Faces, and earlier Beach Boys and Beatles records, although its wider application followed early 1970s releases by Badfinger, the Raspberries, Big Star, and Todd Rundgren. The movement reached its commercial peak during the rise of punk and new wave in the late 1970s, with Cheap Trick, the Romantics, Nick Lowe, Dave Edmunds, and Dwight Twilley among those enjoying the most success. After a popular and critical backlash to the genre's biggest hit, the Knack's 1979 song "My Sharona", record companies generally stopped signing power pop groups, and most of the original bands dissolved.

Over subsequent decades, power pop continued with modest commercial success while also remaining a frequent object of derision among some critics and musicians. The 1990s saw a new wave of alternative bands that were drawn to 1960s artists because of the 1980s music they had influenced. Although not as successful as their predecessors, Jellyfish, the Posies, Redd Kross, Teenage Fanclub, and Material Issue were critical and cult favorites. In the mid-1990s, an offshoot genre that combined power pop-derived harmonies with uptempo punk rock, dubbed "pop-punk", reached mainstream popularity.

== Definition and etymology ==
=== Characteristics ===
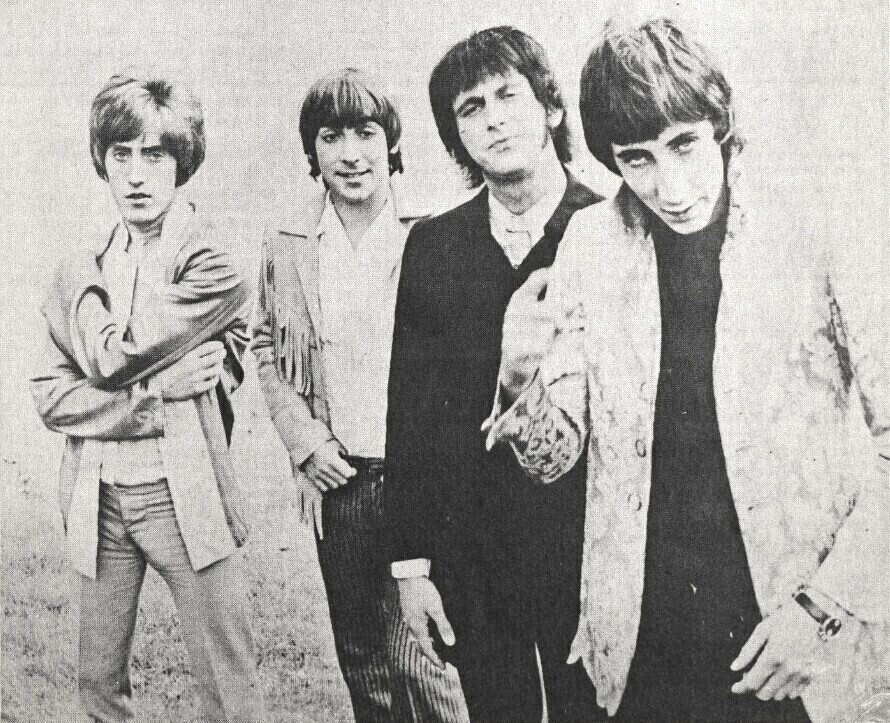
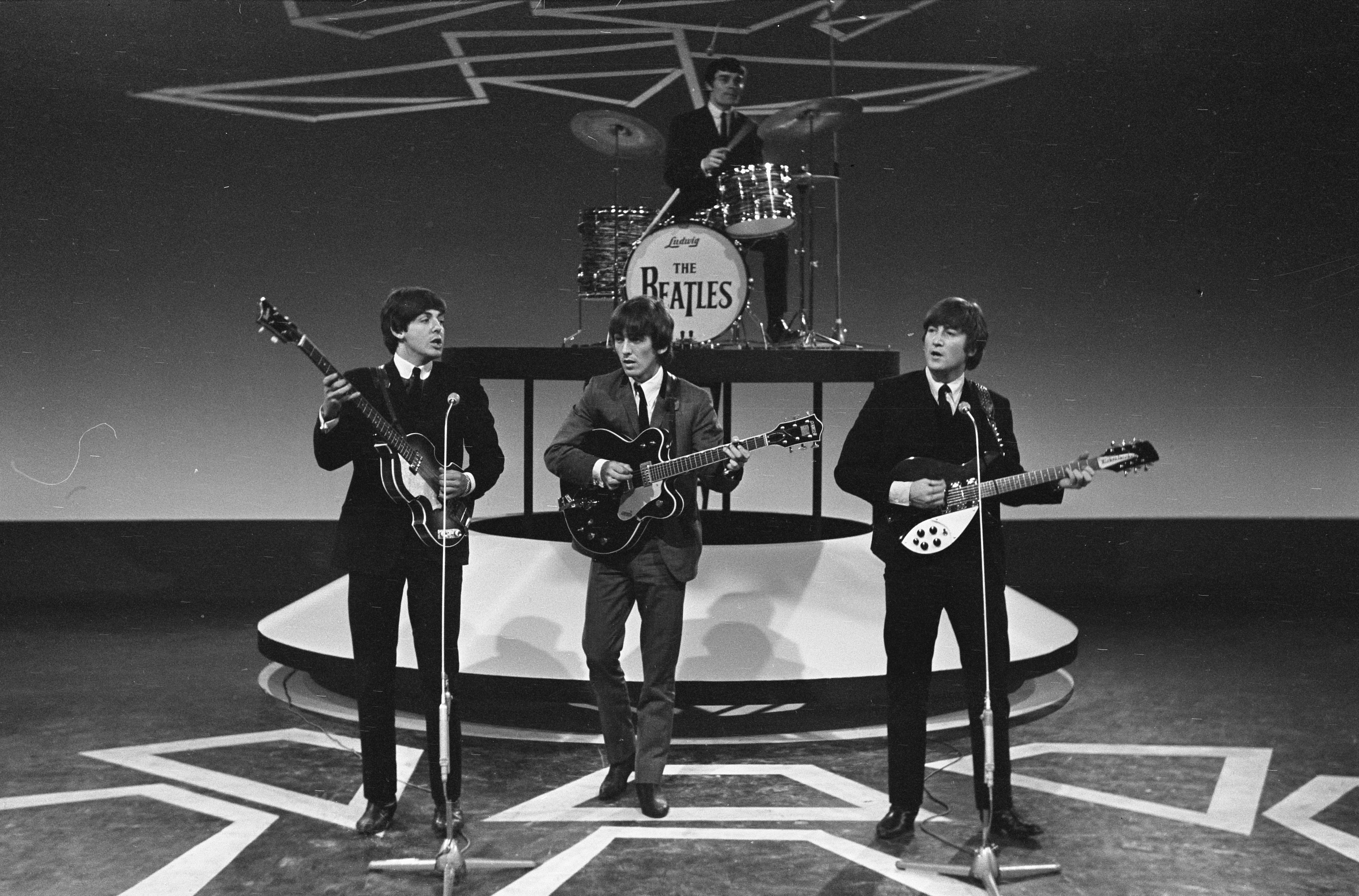
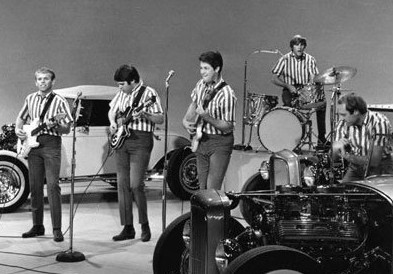
From top: the Who (1967), the Beatles (1964), and the Beach Boys (1964)

Power pop is an energetic variant of pop rock based on melodic hooks, encapsulated as "catchy tunes with an attitude". AllMusic describes the style as "a cross between the crunching hard rock of the Who and the sweet melodicism of the Beatles and the Beach Boys, with the ringing guitars of the Byrds thrown in for good measure". Virtually every artist of the genre has been a rock band consisting of white male musicians who engaged with the song forms, vocal arrangements, chord progressions, rhythm patterns, instrumentation, or overall sound associated with groups of the mid-1960s British Invasion era.

An essential feature of power pop is that its cheerful sounding arrangements are supported by a sense of "yearning", "longing", or "despair" similar to formative works such as "Wouldn't It Be Nice" (the Beach Boys, 1966) and "Pictures of Lily" (the Who, 1967). This might be achieved with an unexpected harmonic change or lyrics that refer to "tonight", "tomorrow night", "Saturday night", and so on. Power pop was also noted for its lack of irony and its reverence to classic pop craft.

=== Scope and recognition ===
The Who's Pete Townshend coined the term in a May 1967 interview with journalist Keith Altham of the New Musical Express promoting their latest single "Pictures of Lily". He said: "Power pop is what we play—what the Small Faces used to play, and the kind of pop the Beach Boys played in the days of 'Fun, Fun, Fun' which I preferred." Despite other bands following in the power pop continuum since then, the term was not popularized until the rise of new wave music in the late 1970s. Greg Shaw, editor of Bomp! magazine, was the most prominent in the slew of music critics that wrote about power pop (then written as "powerpop"). This mirrored similar developments with the term "punk rock" from earlier in the decade. In light of this, Theo Cateforis, author of Are We Not New Wave? (2011), wrote that "the recognition and formulation" of power pop as a genre "was by no means organic."

There is significant debate among fans over what should be classed as power pop. Shaw took credit for codifying the genre in 1978, describing it as a hybrid style of pop and punk. He later wrote that "much to my chagrin, the term was snapped up by legions of limp, second-rate bands hoping the majors would see them as a safe alternative to punk." Music journalist John M. Borack also stated in his 2007 book Shake Some Action – The Ultimate Guide to Power Pop that the label is often applied to varied groups and artists with "blissful indifference", noting its use in connection with Britney Spears, Green Day, the Bay City Rollers and Def Leppard.

Power pop has struggled with its critical reception and is sometimes viewed as a shallow style of music associated with teenage audiences. The perception was exacerbated by record labels in the early 1980s who used the term for marketing post-punk styles. Music critic Ken Sharp summarized that power pop is "the Rodney Dangerfield of rock 'n' roll. [...] the direct updating of the most revered artists—the Who, the Beach Boys, the Beatles—yet it gets no respect." In 1996, singer-songwriter Tommy Keene commented that any association to the term since the 1980s is to be "compared to a lot of bands that didn't sell records, it's like a disease. If you're labeled that, you're history." Musician Steve Albini said: "I cannot bring myself to use the term 'power pop.' Catchy, mock-descriptive terms are for dilettantes and journalists. I guess you could say I think this music is for pussies and should be stopped." Ken Stringfellow of the Posies concurred that "There's a kind of aesthetic to power pop to be light on purpose. I wanted something with more gravitas."

== Original waves ==
=== 1960s: Origins and precursors ===
The Beatles—"I Want to Hold Your Hand" (1963)
Many artists drew elements such as hand claps, ringing guitars, vocal harmonies, and direct romantic lyrics from songs like "I Want to Hold Your Hand".

Power pop originated in the late 1960s as young music fans began to rebel against the emerging pretensions of rock music. During this period, a schism developed between "serious" artists who rejected pop and "crassly commercial" pop acts who embraced their teenybopper audience. Greg Shaw credited the Who as the starting point for power pop, whereas Carl Caferelli (writing in Borack's book) said that "the story really begins circa 1964, with the commercial ascension of the Beatles in America." Caferelli also recognized the Beatles as the embodiment of the "pop band" ideal. According to The Rolling Stone Encyclopedia of Rock & Roll, British Invasion bands, particularly the Merseybeat sound first popularised by the Beatles and its "jangly guitars, pleasant melodies, immaculate vocal harmonies, and a general air of teenage innocence", were a key influence on 1970s power-pop bands such as the Raspberries, Big Star, the Knack and XTC.

I believe pop music should be like the TV—something you can turn on and off and shouldn't disturb the mind. [...] It's very hard to like "Strawberry Fields" for simply what it is. Some artists are becoming musically unapproachable.

— Pete Townshend, 1967

When Pete Townshend coined the term, he suggested that songs like "I Can't Explain" (1965) and "Substitute" (1966) were more accessible than the changing, more experimental directions other groups such as the Beatles were taking. However, the term did not become widely identified with the Who, and it would take a few years before the genre's stylistic elements coalesced into a more recognizable form. The A.V. Club's Noel Murray said that "once the sound became more viable and widely imitated, it was easier to trace the roots of the genre back to rockabilly, doo-wop, girl groups, and the early records of the Beatles, the Byrds, the Beach Boys, the Kinks, and the Who." Robert Hilburn traced the genre "chiefly from the way the Beatles and the Beach Boys mixed rock character and pure Top 40 instincts in such records as the latter's 'California Girls'." Borack noted, "It's also quite easy to draw a not-so-crooked line from garage rock to power pop."

Townshend himself was heavily influenced by the guitar work of Beach Boy Carl Wilson, while the Who's debut single "I Can't Explain" was indebted to the Kinks' "You Really Got Me" (1964). Roy Shuker identified the leading American power pop acts of the time as the Byrds, Tommy James and the Shondells, and Paul Revere and the Raiders. Also significant to power pop in the 1960s were the Dave Clark Five, the Creation, the Easybeats, the Move, and the Nazz.

=== 1970s: Emergence ===
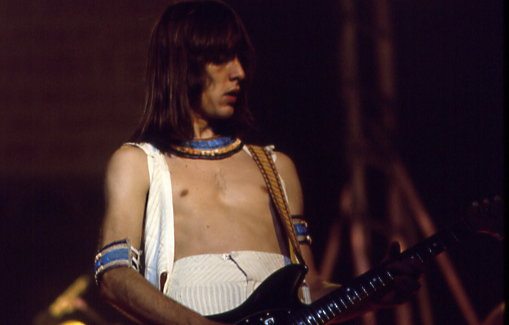
Todd Rundgren's work with Nazz in the 1960s and as a solo artist in the 1970s was significant to the development of the genre.

In the 1970s, the rock scene fragmented into many new styles. Artists drifted away from the influence of early Beatles songs, and those who cited the Beatles or the Who as influences were in the minority. According to music journalist Paul Lester, "powerpop is really a 70s invention. It's about young musicians missing the 60s but taking its sound in new directions. [...] not just an alternative to prog and the hippy troubadours, but a cousin to glam." Novelist Michael Chabon believed that the genre did not truly come into its own until the emergence of "second generation" power pop acts in the early 1970s. Lester added that it was "essentially an American response to the British Invasion, made by Anglophiles a couple of years too young to have been in bands the first time round."

For many fans of power pop, according to Caferelli, the "bloated and sterile" aspect of 1970s rock was indicative of the void left by the Beatles' breakup in 1970. During the early to middle part of the decade, only a few acts continued the tradition of Beatles-style pop. Some were younger glam/glitter bands, while others were "'60s holdovers" that refused to update their sound. One of the most prominent groups in the latter category was Badfinger, the first artists signed to the Beatles' Apple Records. Although they had international top 10 chart success with "Come and Get It" (1969), "No Matter What" (1970), and "Day After Day" (1971), they were criticized in the music press as Beatles imitators. Caferelli describes them as "one of the earliest—and finest purveyors" of power pop. Conversely, AllMusic states that while Badfinger were among the groups that established the genre's sound, the Raspberries were the only power pop band of the era to have hit singles. Noel Murray wrote that Badfinger had "some key songs" that were power pop "before the genre really existed".

Raspberries — "Go All the Way" (1972)
"Go All the Way" is often lauded as one of the finest power pop songs. Its music draws on Beach Boys-style harmonies, Beatles-style melodies, and Who-style energy.

According to Magnet's Andrew Earles, 1972 was "year zero" for power pop. Developments from that year included the emergence of Big Star and the Raspberries, the release of Todd Rundgren's Something/Anything?, and the recording of the Flamin' Groovies' "Shake Some Action"; additionally, many garage bands had stopped emulating the Rolling Stones. Chabon additionally credited the Raspberries, Badfinger, Big Star, and Rundgren's "Couldn't I Just Tell You" and "I Saw the Light" with "inventing" the genre. On a television performance from 1978, Rundgren introduced "Couldn't I Just Tell You" as a part of "the latest musical trend, power pop." Lester called the studio recording of the song a "masterclass in compression" and said that Rundgren "staked his claim to powerpop immortality [and] set the whole ball rolling".

Earles identified the Raspberries as the only American band that had hit singles. Murray recognized the Raspberries as the most representative power pop band and described their 1972 US top 10 "Go All the Way" as "practically a template for everything the genre could be, from the heavy arena-rock hook to the cooing, teenybopper-friendly verses and chorus." Caferelli described the follow-up "I Wanna Be with You" (1972) as "perhaps the definitive power pop single". However, like Badfinger, the Raspberries were derided as "Beatles clones". Singer Eric Carmen remembered that there "were a lot of people in 1972 who were not ready for any band that even remotely resembled the Beatles." Raspberries dissolved in 1975 as Carmen pursued a solo career.

=== 1970s–1980s: Commercial peak and decline ===
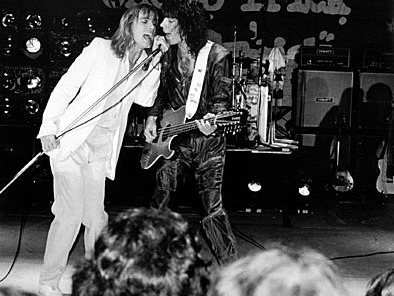
Cheap Trick playing in 1978

A recognizable movement of power pop bands following in the tradition of the Raspberries started emerging in the late 1970s, with groups such as Cheap Trick, the Jam, the Romantics, Shoes, and the Flamin' Groovies, who were seen as 1960s revivalist bands. Much of these newer bands were influenced by late 1960s AM radio, which fell into a rapid decline due to the popularity of the AOR and progressive rock FM radio format. By 1977, there was a renewed interest in the music and culture of the 1960s, with examples such as the Beatlemania musical and the growing mod revival. AABA forms and double backbeats also made their return after many years of disuse in popular music.

Spurred on by the emergence of punk rock and new wave, power pop enjoyed a prolific and commercially successful period from the late 1970s into the early 1980s. Throughout the two decades, the genre existed parallel to and occasionally drew from developments such as glam rock, pub rock, punk, new wave, college rock, and neo-psychedelia. AllMusic states that these new groups were "swept along with the new wave because their brief, catchy songs fit into the post-punk aesthetic." Most bands rejected the irreverence, cynicism, and irony that characterized new wave, believing that pop music was an art that reached its apex in the mid-1960s, sometimes referred to as the "poptopia". This in turn led many critics to dismiss power pop as derivative work.

Ultimately, the groups with the best-selling records were Cheap Trick, the Knack, the Romantics, Tommy Tutone and Dwight Twilley, whereas Shoes, the Records, the Nerves, and 20/20 only drew cult followings. Writing for Time in 1978, Jay Cocks cited Nick Lowe and Dave Edmunds as "the most accomplished purveyors of power pop", which he described as "the well-groomed stepbrother of punk rock". Edmunds was quoted: "Before the New Wave [...] There was no chance for the little guy who buys a guitar and starts a band. What we're doing is kids' music, really, just four-four time and good songs." Cheap Trick became the most successful act in the genre's history thanks to the band's constant touring schedule and stage theatrics. According to Andrew Earles, the group's "astonishing acceptance in Japan (documented on 1979's At Budokan) and hits 'Surrender' and 'I Want You To Want Me,' the Trick took power pop to an arena level and attained a degree of success that the genre had never seen, nor would ever see again."

The biggest chart hit by a power pop band was the Knack's debut single, "My Sharona", which topped the Billboard Hot 100 chart for six weeks in August–September 1979. However, the song's ubiquitous radio presence that summer spawned a popular and critical backlash against the band, which in turn led to a backlash against the power pop genre in general. Once the Knack failed to maintain their commercial momentum, record companies generally stopped signing power pop groups. Most bands of the 1970s milieu broke up in the early 1980s.

== Succeeding waves ==
=== 1980s–1990s: Alternative rock ===
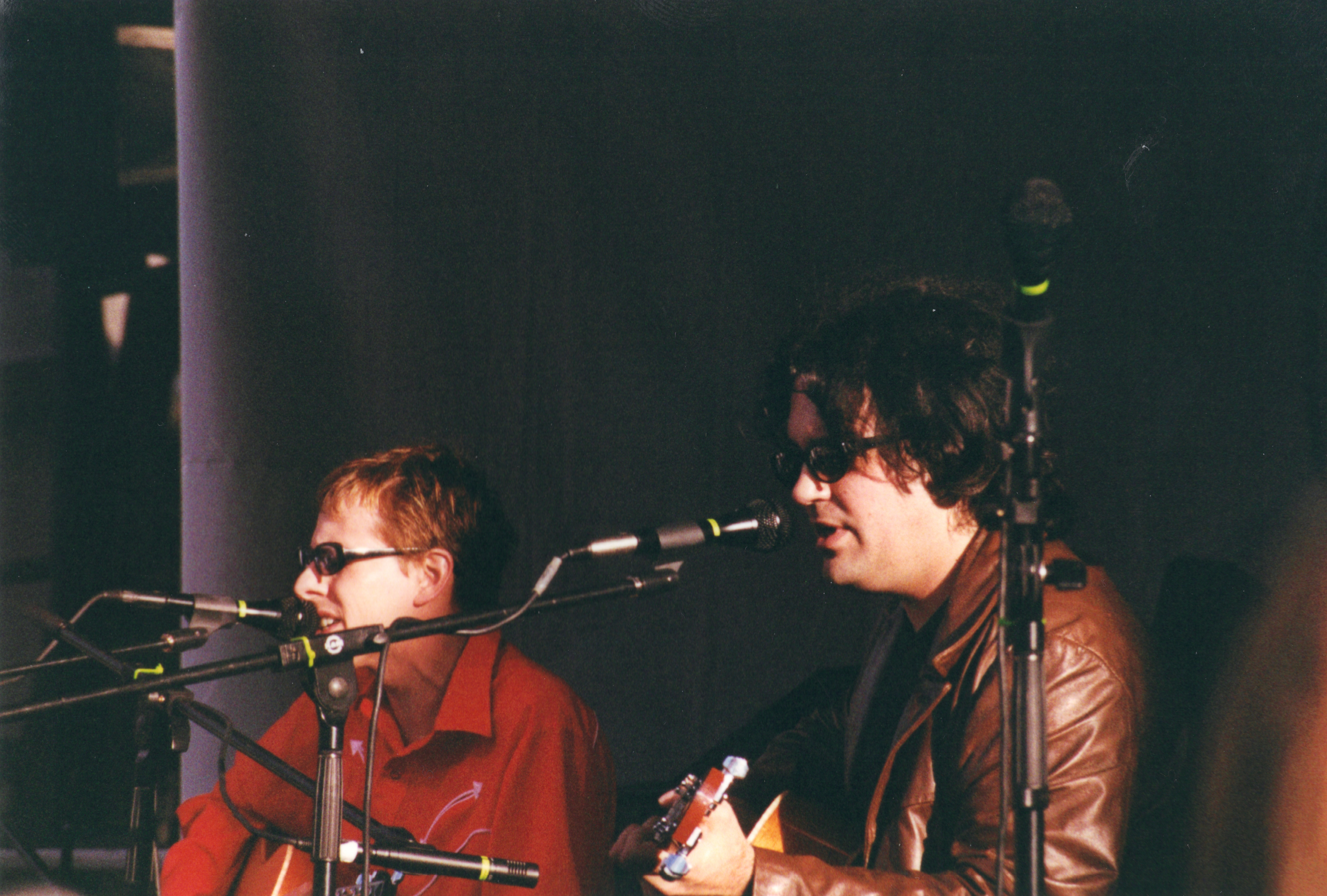
The Posies, 2000

In the 1980s and 1990s, power pop continued as a commercially modest genre with artists such as Redd Kross and the Spongetones. The later records of XTC also became a touchstone for bands such as Jellyfish and the Apples in Stereo, while Big Star developed an avid cult following among members of later bands like R.E.M. and the Replacements who expressed esteem for the group's work. Many bands who were primarily influenced by Big Star blended power pop with the ethos and sounds of alternative rock. AllMusic cited Teenage Fanclub, Material Issue, and the Posies as "critical and cult favorites".

In 1991, the Los Angeles Times's Chris Willman identified Jellyfish, the Posies, and Redd Kross as the leaders of a "new wave of rambunctious Power Pop bands that recall the days when moptops were geniuses, songs were around three minutes long and a great hook--a catchy melodic phrase that "hooks" the listener—was godhead." Members of Jellyfish and Posies said that they were drawn to 1960s artists because of the 1980s music they influenced. At the time, it was uncertain whether the movement could have mainstream success. Karen Glauber, editor of Hits magazine, said that "The popular conception is that these bands are 'retro,' or not post-modern enough because they're not grunge and because the Posies are from Seattle and don't sound like Mudhoney."

Velvet Crush's Ric Menck credited Nirvana with ultimately making it "possible for people like Matthew [Sweet] and the Posies and Material Issue and, to some extent, us to get college radio play." As power pop "gained the attention of hip circles", many older bands reformed to record new material that was released on independent labels. Chicago label The Numero Group issued a compilation album called Yellow Pills: Prefill, featuring overlooked pop tracks from 1979–1982. For the rest of decade, AllMusic writes, "this group of independent, grass-roots power-pop bands gained a small but dedicated cult following in the United States."

With the rise of bands like the Apples In Stereo, power pop became a major component of the Elephant 6 music collective's identity often mixing with psychedelic and Slacker rock.

=== Post–1990s ===
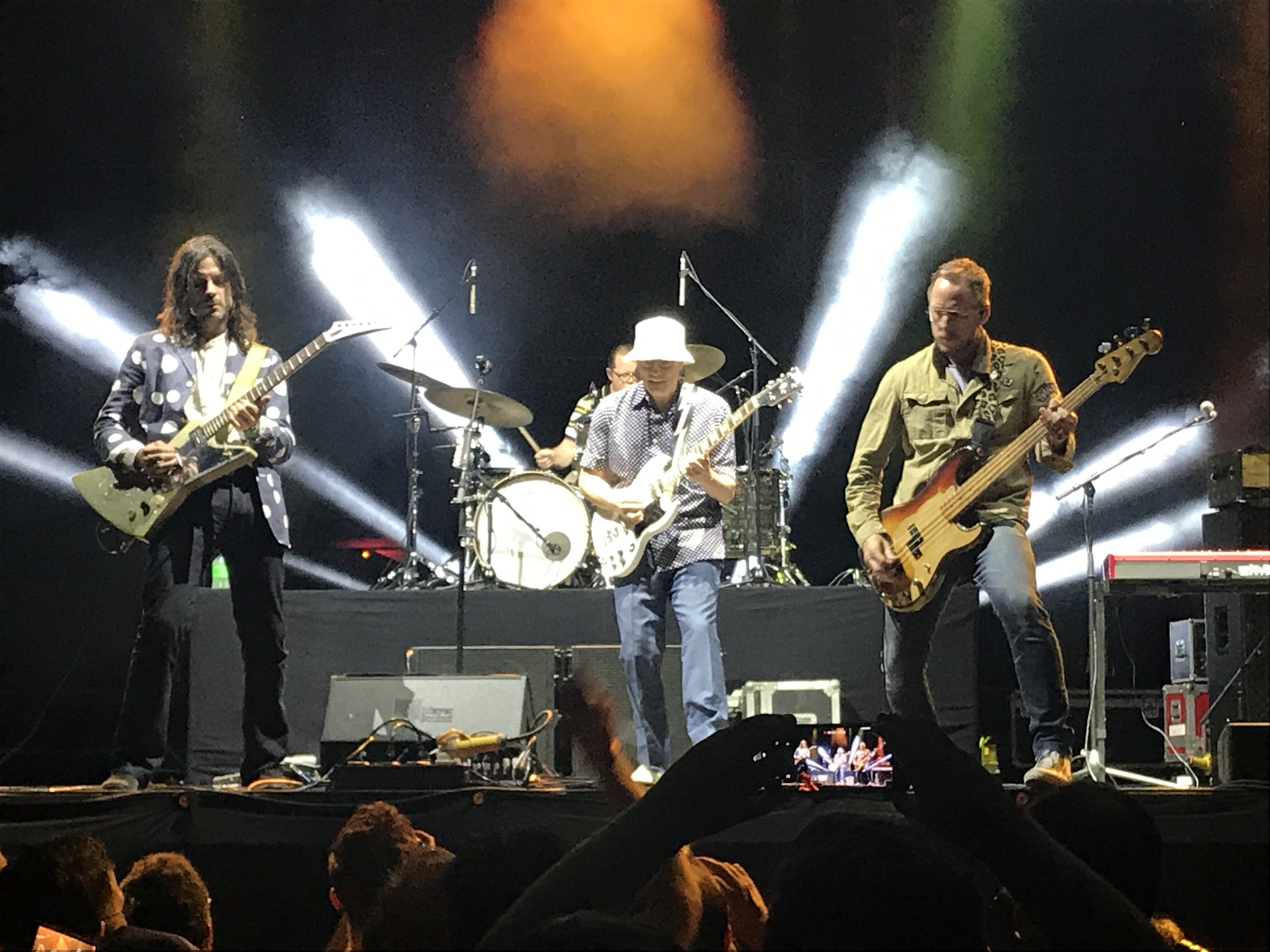
Weezer plays Musikfest in Bethlehem, Pennsylvania, August 2019

Power pop has had varying levels of success since the 1990s. In 1994, Green Day and Weezer popularized pop-punk, an alternative rock variant genre that fuses power pop harmonies with uptempo punk moods. According to Louder Than War's Sam Lambeth, power pop has "ebbed and flowed" while remaining an object of critical derision. Despite this, he cites Fountains of Wayne with inspiring "yet another new era for the format" during the late 1990s, "one they'd perfect with the magnetic Welcome Interstate Managers (2003)."

In 1998, International Pop Overthrow (IPO)—named after the album of the same name by Material Issue—began holding a yearly festival for power pop bands. Originally taking place in Los Angeles, the festival expanded to several locations over the years, including Canada and Liverpool, England (the latter event included performances at the Cavern Club). Paul Collins of the Beat and the Nerves hosted the Power Pop-A-Licious music festival in 2011 and 2013, featuring a mixture of classic and rising bands with an emphasis on power pop, punk rock, garage and roots rock. The concerts were held at Asbury Lanes in Asbury Park, New Jersey, and the Cake Shop in New York City. Paul Collins and his group the Beat headlined the two-day events.

Writing in 2017, Lambeth commented that the genre's "core traits" were stil pursued by groups such as Best Coast, Sløtface, Diet Cig and Dude York.

== See also ==
- Paisley Underground
- Britpop
- List of power pop artists and songs
- List of power pop albums

== Suggested reading ==
- Rockwell, John (December 30, 1979). "Disco vs. Rock and Industry Ills Made the Year Dramatic". The New York Times.
- Sharp, Ken; Sulpy, Doug (1997). Power Pop: Conversations with the Power Pop Elite.

== Suggested listening ==
- DIY: Come Out and Play - American Power Pop I (1975–78) (Rhino Records, compilation CD, 1993)
- DIY: Shake It Up! - American Power Pop II (1978–80) (Rhino Records, compilation CD, 1993)
- Girls Go Power Pop (Big Beat Records, compilation CD, 2020)
- Harmony in My Head: UK Power Pop & New Wave (Cherry Red, 3XCD compilation, 2018)
- Poptopia! Power Pop Classics of the '70s (Rhino Records, compilation CD, 1997)
- Poptopia! Power Pop Classics of the '80s (Rhino Records, compilation CD, 1997)
- Poptopia! Power Pop Classics of the '90s (Rhino Records, compilation CD, 1997)
- Power Pop Anthems (Virgin, 2XCD compilation, 2002)
