= 1883 in literature =

This article contains information about the literary events and publications of 1883.

== Events ==
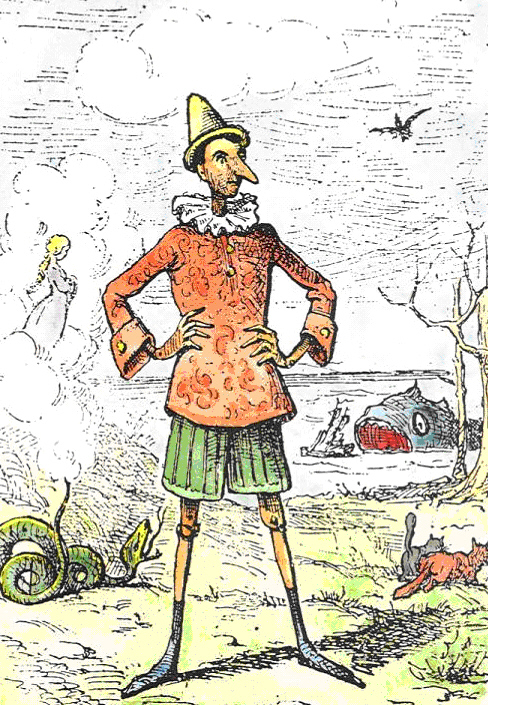
The Adventures of Pinocchio, illustration from the first Italian edition

- January 13 – Henrik Ibsen's play An Enemy of the People (En folkefiende, 1882) gains its first performance at the Christiania Theatre.
- February – Carlo Collodi's children's story The Adventures of Pinocchio first appears complete in book form as Le avventure di Pinocchio in Italy.
- May 23 – Robert Louis Stevenson's children's pirate adventure novel Treasure Island first appears in book form from Cassell in London.
- June – Footlights, the University of Cambridge drama club in England, gives its first performance.
- June 4 – Mihai Eminescu reads his nationalist poem Doina to an enthusiastic crowd at Junimea in Iași. It is sometimes described as his last work before a mental breakdown later this year. Eminescu's host Ion Creangă recalls it being composed on the spot, but some researchers date it back to 1870.
- June 30–October 20 – Robert Louis Stevenson's novel The Black Arrow: A Tale of Tunstall Forest is serialized in the British magazine Young Folks as by "Captain George North". Stevenson completes writing it at the end of the summer in France.
- July – The first issue of Fiamuri Arbërit, an Albanian literary and political magazine, is published from Cosenza. Managed by Girolamo de Rada, it promotes Ottomanism against Philhellenism.
- August – Ivan Turgenev dictates his last story, "An end", to Pauline Viardot (who writes it in French) on his deathbed at Bougival in France.
- August 29 – Dunfermline Carnegie Library, the first Carnegie library, opens in Andrew Carnegie's home town, Dunfermline, Scotland.
- October 3–9 – Turgenev's body is returned by train from Paris to Saint Petersburg with crowds turning out to honor him.
- December 27–28 – The Modern Language Association of America holds its first meeting.
- Uncertain dates
  - Mark Twain's memoirs Life on the Mississippi are published simultaneously in Boston (Massachusetts) and London, as the first major book submitted to a publisher in typescript.
  - Kisari Mohan Ganguli begins publication of the first English-language translation of the Mahabharata.
  - The Deutsches Theater company is formed in Berlin.

== New books ==
=== Fiction ===
- Emilia Pardo Bazán – La tribuna
- Mary Elizabeth Braddon – Phantom Fortune
- Rhoda Broughton – Belinda
- Wilkie Collins – Heart and Science
- Hugh Conway – Called Back
- Anne Elliot – Dr. Edith Romney
- Ludwig Ganghofer – The Hunter of Fall
- John Hay – The Bread-Winners (anonymous serialization in The Century Magazine)
- Alexander Kielland – Poison (Gift)
- Jonas Lie – Familien paa Gilje (The Gilje family)
- John Macnie (as Ismar Thiusen) – The Diothas; or, A Far Look Ahead
- Mary E. Mann – The Parish of Hilby
- Guy de Maupassant – Une Vie
- George A. Moore – A Modern Lover
- Friedrich Nietzsche – Thus Spoke Zarathustra (Also sprach Zarathustra, publication begins)
- Margaret Oliphant – Hester: A Story of Contemporary Life
- Sir Thomas Wemyss Reid – Gladys Fane
- Charlotte Riddell – A Struggle for Fame
- Annie S. Swan – Aldersyde
- Giovanni Verga – Novelle rusticane (Rustic short stories, about Sicily)
- Jules Verne – Kéraban the Inflexible (Kéraban-le-têtu)
- Auguste Villiers de l'Isle-Adam – Contes cruels

=== Children and young people ===
- Carlo Collodi – The Adventures of Pinocchio (Le avventure di Pinocchio) (book publication)
- George MacDonald – The Princess and Curdie
- Howard Pyle – The Merry Adventures of Robin Hood
- Robert Louis Stevenson – Treasure Island (book publication)

=== Drama ===
- Frances Hodgson Burnett and William Gillette – Esmeralda
- François Coppée – Severo Torelli
- Imre Madách – The Tragedy of Man (Az ember tragédiája, first performed)
- Edward Rose – Vice Versa
- George Robert Sims – In the Ranks
- August Strindberg – Lycko-Pers resa (Lucky Peter's Travels or Lucky Pehr)
- Oscar Wilde – Vera; or, The Nihilists (first performed)
- William Young – The Rajah; or Wyncot's Ward

=== Non-fiction ===
- American Medical Association – Journal of the American Medical Association
- Mathilde Blind – George Eliot
- Hall Caine – Cobwebs of Criticism
- Thomas Hill Green (died 1882) – Prolegomena to Ethics
- J.-K. Huysmans – L'Art moderne
- Agnes Catherine Maitland (as A. C. M., Examiner...) – The Rudiments of Cookery: a Manual for Use in Schools and Homes
- William Robinson – The English Flower Garden
- J. R. Seeley – The Expansion of England
- Alfred Percy Sinnett – Esoteric Buddhism
- John Addington Symonds – A Problem in Greek Ethics: an inquiry into the phenomenon of sexual inversion, addressed especially to medical psychologists and jurists
- Mark Twain – Life on the Mississippi

== Births ==
- January 1 – Alberto Gerchunoff, Argentine writer (died 1949)
- January 6 – Kahlil Gibran, Lebanese-born poet and novelist writing in Arabic and English (died 1931)
- January 10 – Aleksei Tolstoy, Russian writer (died 1945)
- January 20 – Forrest Wilson, American journalist and author (died 1942)
- January 21 – Olav Aukrust, Norwegian poet and teacher (died 1929)
- February 8 – Joseph Schumpeter, Austrian/American political economist (died 1950)
- February 15 – Sax Rohmer (Arthur Henry Ward), English novelist (died 1959)
- February 16 – Elizabeth Craig, Scottish cookery writer (died [1980)
- February 20 – Naoya Shiga, Japanese novelist (died 1971)
- March 2 (February 18 O.S.) – Nikos Kazantzakis, Greek novelist (died 1957)
- March 9 – Umberto Saba, Italian poet and novelist (died 1957)
- March 17 – Urmuz, Romanian short prose writer (died 1923)
- March 27 (March 15 O.S.) – Marie Under, Estonian poet (died 1980)
- April 18 – Aleksanteri Aava, Finnish poet (died 1956)
- April 27 – Hubert Harrison, African-American writer, critic, and activist (died 1927)
- April 30 – Jaroslav Hašek, Czech novelist (died 1923)
- June 3 – Franz Kafka, Czech novelist writing in German (died 1924)
- June 4 – Joseph Jefferson Farjeon, English crime writer (died 1955)
- July 29 – Porfirio Barba-Jacob, Colombian writer (died 1942)
- September 14 – Rose Combe, French writer and railway worker (died 1932)
- September 22 – Ferenc Oslay, Hungarian-Slovene historian, writer and irredenta (died 1932)
- October 18 – Helena Boguszewska, Polish writer, columnist and a social activist (died 1978)
- December 20 – May Edginton, English popular novelist (died 1957)
- December 23 – Yoshishige Abe, Japanese philosopher and politician (died 1966)
- December 30 – Marie Gevers, Belgian novelist writing in French (died 1975)

== Deaths ==
- January 21 – Anna Eliza Bray, English novelist and travel writer (born 1790)
- March 14 – Karl Marx, German philosopher (born 1818)
- April 24 – Jules Sandeau, French novelist (born 1811)
- May 15 – Mary Elizabeth Mohl ("Clarkey"), English-born literary salonnière (born 1793)
- May 23 – Cyprian Norwid, Polish poet, dramatist and artist (born 1821)
- June 20 – Gustave Aimard, French novelist (born 1818)
- June 11 – Caroline Leigh Gascoigne, English poet, novelist and short story writer (born 1813)
- July 16 – Edward Backhouse Eastwick, Anglo-Indian orientalist and translator (born 1814)
- August 31 – Levin Schücking, German novelist (born 1814)
- September 2 – Léon Halévy, French historian and dramatist (born 1802)
- September 3 – Ivan Turgenev, Russian novelist (born 1818)
- September 10 – Hendrik Conscience, Flemish novelist (born 1812)
- September 25 – George Ayliffe Poole, English writer and cleric (born 1809)
- November 26 – Sojourner Truth, African American abolitionist, women's rights activist and author (born 1797)
- December 13 – Victor de Laprade, French poet and critic (born 1812)
- unknown date – Mary S. B. Shindler, American poet (born 1810)
