= Phoebe (given name) =

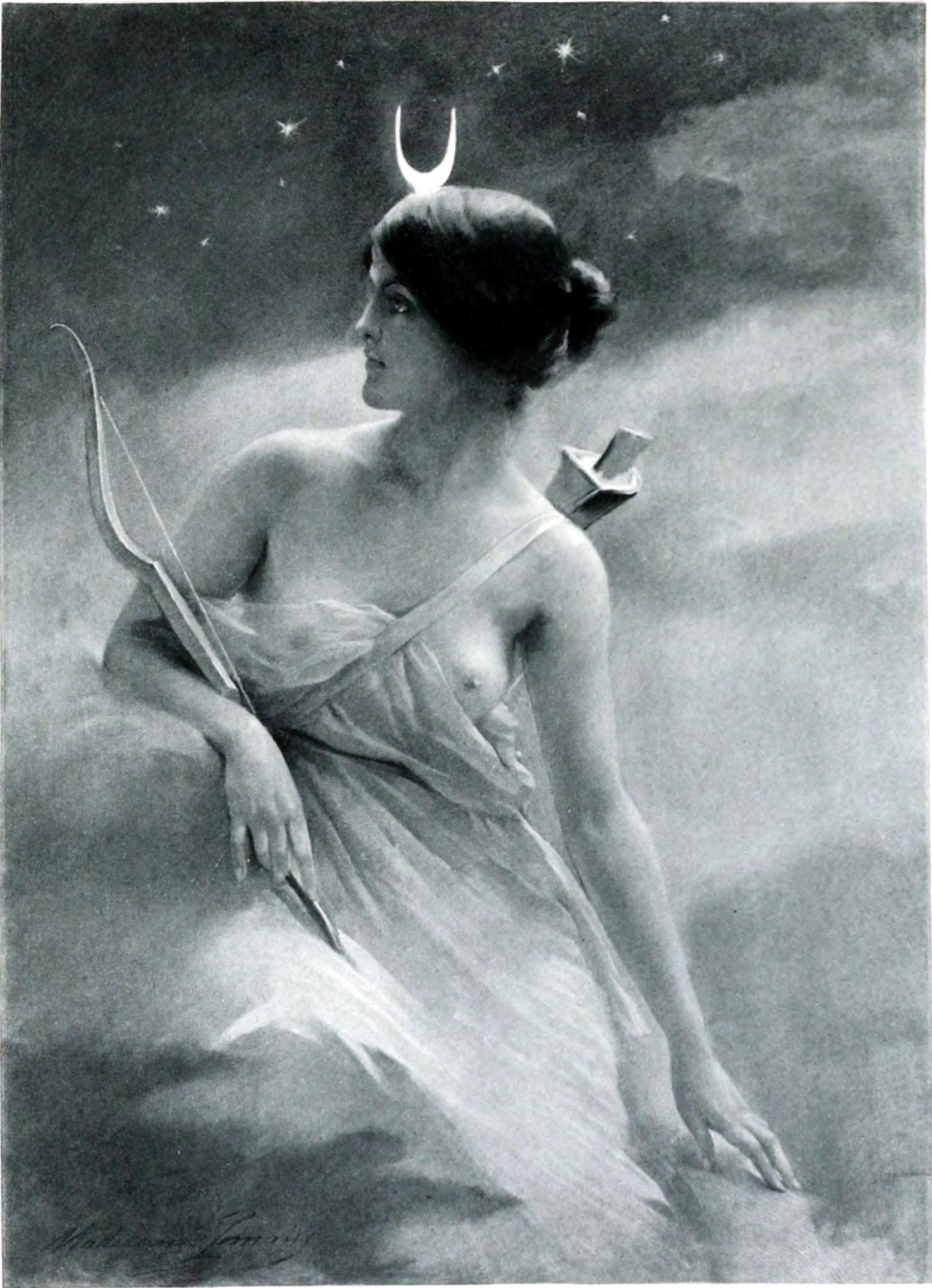
- Phoebe by Madeleine Lemaire, 1896.
- Gender: Feminine
- Language: Greek

Origin
- Meaning: “Bright, shining”

Other names
- Variant forms: Febe, Fébé, Fibi, Phebe, Pheaby, Phebea, Phebie, Pheby, Pheebe, Pheebee, Pheeby, Phobe, Phoeba, Phoebea, Phoebee, Phoebey, Phoebi, Phoebie, Phoeby
- Related names: Ferbia, Ferby, Fereba, Ferebee, Fereby, Feribie, Ferriby, Phearoby, Pherba, Pheraba, Pheribee, Pheriby, Pheroba,

Phoebe or Phœbe (/ˈfiːbi/ FEE-bee; Ancient Greek: Φοίβη, romanized: Phoíbē) is a female name, the feminine form of the male name Phoebus (Φοῖβος), an epithet of Apollo meaning "bright", "shining", and “pure”.

In Greek mythology, Phoebe was a Titan associated with the power of prophecy as well as the moon. This was also an epithet of her granddaughter Artemis. A moon of Saturn bears this name in honor of the Titan. A certain Phoebe also appears in Paul the Apostle's Epistle to the Romans in the New Testament, a female minister in the church at Kechries near Corinth.

An alternate spelling is Phebe, and an older style Phœbe. Phereby and numerous phonetic spellings of the name are variants of Phoebe that developed in the American South.

The name was popular in the Anglosphere during the 17th century. Phoebe has increased in usage in English-speaking countries since the 1990s. Phoebe Buffay, a main character on the American television series Friends, which aired from 1994 to 2004, helped popularize the name.

== People with the given name Phoebe ==
- Phoebe Adams (born 1953), American visual artist
- Phoebe Brand (1907–2004), American actress who was blacklisted during the McCarthy era
- Phoebe Bridgers (born 1994), American musician
- Phoebe Brown (born 1991), English singer, founding member of the girl groups Girls Can't Catch and Hope
- Phoebe Campbell (1847–1872), Canadian murderer
- Phoebe Campbell (born 1997 or 1998), English actor
- Phoebe Carrai (born 1955), American cellist
- Phoebe Cary (1824–1871), American poet
- Phoebe Cates (born 1963), American actress
- Phoebe Conn (born 1941), American author
- Phoebe Couzins (1848–1912), one of the first female lawyers in the U.S. and the first female marshal
- Phoebe Di Tommaso (born 1990), Australian figure skater
- Phoebe Doty (died 1849), American prostitute
- Phoebe Dynevor (born 1995), English actress
- Phoebe Ephron (1914–1971), American playwright and screenwriter
- Phoebe Gilman (1940–2002), American children's book author and illustrator
- Phoebe Gloeckner (born 1960), American cartoonist, illustrator, painter, and novelist
- Phoebe Hearst (1842–1919), American philanthropist and feminist
- Phoebe Hesketh (1909–2005), English poet
- Phoebe Hessel (1713–1821), British soldier who disguised herself as a man to serve in army
- Phoebe Hirsch (born 1949), former member of SDS and Weatherman
- Phoebe Judson (1831–1926), American pioneer and author
- Phoebe Knapp (1839–1908), American composer
- Phoebe Kreutz, singer-songwriter
- Phoebe Lankester (1825–1900), British botanist and popular science writer
- Phoebe Learmont (born 2005), Australian rhythmic gymnast
- Phoebe Legere, multi-format artist
- Phoebe Mills (born 1972), American attorney and athlete active in multiple sports
- Phoebe Nicholls (born 1957), English film, television, and stage actor
- Phoebe Omlie (1902–1975), American aviation pioneer and one of the first female aviators
- Phoebe Palmer (1807–1874), evangelist, writer, and promoter of the doctrine of Christian perfection
- Phoebe Pember (1823–1913), nurse and medical administrator during the American Civil War
- Phoebe Philo (born 1973), British fashion designer and previous creative director of Celine
- Phoebe Paterson Pine (born 1997), British Paralympic archer
- Phoebe Prince (1994–2010), bullying victim
- Phoebe Russell, Australian classical double bass player
- Phoebe Ryan (born 1990), American singer and songwriter
- Phoebe Snetsinger, née Burnett (1931–1999), American birder
- Phoebe Snow (1950–2011), musician
- Phoebe Strole (born 1983), American actress and singer
- Phoebe Atwood Taylor (1909–1976), American mystery author
- Phoebe Thomas (born 1983), British actress
- Phoebe Tonkin (born 1989), Australian actress and model
- Phoebe Anna Traquair (1852–1936), Irish artist noted for her role in the Arts and Crafts Movement
- Phoebe Wahl, illustrator, sculptor and children's book author from the United States
- Phoebe Waller-Bridge (born 1985), English actress, writer, playwright and director
- Phoebe Holcroft Watson (1898–1980), English tennis player

== Women named Fébé ==
- Fébé Potgieter-Gqubule, South African politician

== People with the surname Phoebe ==
- Anna Phoebe (born 1981), German-born British violinist

== Biblical and mythological figures ==
- Phoebe (biblical figure), a woman mentioned in Romans 16:1
- Phoebe (mythology), various figures

== Fictional characters ==
=== In books ===
- Phoebe Somerville Calebow, the protagonist of Susan Elizabeth Phillips' It Had to Be You and main character in the Chicago Stars series
- Phoebe Caulfield, the little sister of Holden Caulfield in The Catcher in the Rye
- The title character of Phoebe Daring, a mystery novel by L. Frank Baum
- Phoebe Henry, a child born with down syndrome in The Memory Keeper's Daughter
- Phoebe Meryll, the daughter of Sergeant Meryll in the comic opera The Yeomen of the Guard by Gilbert and Sullivan
- Phoebe Pyncheon, a young vivacious female country cousin in The House of the Seven Gables
- Phoebe Winterbottom, the best friend of Salmanca Tree Hiddle in Walk Two Moons
- Phoebe, a demigod briefly described in The Titan's Curse, the third novel in Rick Riordan's series Percy Jackson & the Olympians
- Phoebe, a Sister of the Light in The Sword of Truth series by Terry Goodkind
- Phoebe the Fashion Fairy, in the Rainbow Magic book franchise
- Miss Phoebe Beecham, the protagonist in Phoebe, Junior of The Chronicles of Carlingford series by Margaret Oliphant

=== In film and television ===
- Phoebe Abbott, Phoebe Buffay's biological mother in TV show Friends
- Phoebe Aldridge, in the British radio soap opera The Archers
- Phoebe Banks, in the Disney film Enchanted
- Phoebe Bright, in the Australian soap opera Neighbours
- Phoebe Buffay, a main character in the NBC sitcom Friends, portrayed by Lisa Kudrow
- Phoebe Farragut, in the animated television series James Bond Jr.
- Phoebe Figalilly, the mystical governess and nanny in the television series Nanny and the Professor
- Phoebe Forrester, daughter of Ridge and Taylor in the soap opera The Bold and the Beautiful
- Phoebe Furchester-Fuzz, one of the main characters on The Furchester Hotel
- Phoebe Halliwell, a witch, one of the main characters on the television drama series Charmed, portrayed by Alyssa Milano
- Phoebe Heyerdahl, one of the main characters of the Nickelodeon animated television series Hey Arnold!
- Phoebe Lichten, the main character of the film Phoebe in Wonderland
- Phoebe McQueen, in the British soap opera Hollyoaks
- Phoebe Nicholson, in the Australian soap opera Home and Away
- Phoebe North, in the 2005 remake of Yours, Mine and Ours
- Phoebe O'Hara, in Kindergarten Cop, portrayed by Pamela Reed
- Phoebe Rose, one of the three main fairies in Dew Drop Diaries, voiced by Sydney Mikayla
- Phoebe Sparrow, née Bamford, Gary Sparrow's girlfriend and later wife in the television series Goodnight Sweetheart
- Phoebe Spengler, a ghostbuster, one of the main characters on the film Ghostbusters: Afterlife and Ghostbusters: Frozen Empire, portrayed by Mckenna Grace
- Phoebe Terese, main character from The Magic School Bus
- Phoebe Thunderman, one of the title characters of Nickelodeon's comedy series The Thundermans
- Phoebe, main character in American Ultra, portrayed by Kristen Stewart
- Phoebe, a character in Cartoon Network's OK K.O.! Let's Be Heroes
- Phoebe, from the "'Monster Clubhouse'" segment of Sesame Street
- Phoebe, one of the three Weird Sisters in the animated television series Gargoyles, said to represent Grace
- Phoebe, the English name of the main character "Popis" from the animated television series El Chavo Animado.
- Phoebe (Flame Princess) in the animated television series Adventure Time
- Phoebe Morris, in the television series Lovesick

=== In games ===
- Phoebe, a character from Square's Final Fantasy Mystic Quest video game
- Phoebe (Pokémon), a member of the Hoenn Elite Four from Pokémon
- Phoibe, a character in Assassin's Creed Odyssey
- Phoebe, a character from Animal Crossing, A sisterly Ostrich who resembles a Phoenix.
- Phoebe, a character from Rimworld. One of the three original storytellers.
- Phoebe, a playable character in Wuthering Waves, an Acolyte of the Order of the Deep.

=== Toys ===
- Phoebe, a doll in the Groovy Girls line by Manhattan Toy
- Phoebe, a Bratz character
- Phoebe, an our generation doll

=== Other ===
- Phoebe Howell, in the comic strip Phoebe and Her Unicorn
- Phoebe Snow (character), a woman who served as the main character of a turn-of-the-century ad campaign for the Lackawanna Railroad in Pennsylvania
- Phoebe D'Ysquith, a character from the stage musical comedy A Gentleman's Guide to Love and Murder

== See also ==
- Phoebe (disambiguation)
