= Walk On Mars =

American rock band

- Also known as: WOM
- Origin: Boston, Massachusetts, U.S.
- Genres: Pop-Punk; Pop rock; Alternative rock
- Years active: 2021–present
- Members: Mary Jo Swank; Ben Shead
- Past members: Emmy Barone; Kyle Reinhart; Chase Leibowitz; Haven Veraguas; Nate Bryant; Caleb Board
- Website: walkonmarsband.com

Walk On Mars (often abbreviated to WOM) is an American Pop-Punk band formed in 2021 in Boston, Massachusetts. The band is known for its energetic sound and lyrical themes addressing societal issues, notably challenging gender stereotypes in the music industry.

Their early success came with viral videos, notably a parody of Fountains of Wayne’s "Stacy's Mom", which helped establish their signature neon green aesthetic. WOM's debut album PHOBOS was released in March 2023, after which the band transitioned into Swank's solo project. With her taking the lead on new material as an independent artist, Walk On Mars has continued to grow, collaborating with notable figures in the music scene and releasing popular singles such as “Voodoo Barbie” and “Fraud.”

== History ==
=== 2020–2021: Formation and first lineup ===
Walk On Mars was conceptualized by lead vocalist Mary Jo Swank in late 2020, while attending Berklee College of Music remotely due to the COVID-19 pandemic. After sharing the idea with her friend and drummer Caleb Board, the band was formed in January 2021 with the addition of guitarist Shawn Gaskill. However, Gaskill was replaced shortly thereafter by Chase Leibowitz alongside bassist George Ariza. By May 2021, pianist Haven Veraguas had joined, with this lineup being featured in the band's first YouTube video, a cover of My Chemical Romance's "Cancer". Finally, bassist Nate Bryant replaced Ariza, solidifying the first permanent members of Walk On Mars that would write the majority of their debut album PHOBOS.

In September 2021, Ben Shead joined the band as their manager, making his first public appearance with them during an interview at the Endless Summer Festival in Hull, Massachusetts. Shead has also contributed to several original songs, with credits including writing, production, keys and backing vocals. He is seen playing piano in a YouTube cover of My Chemical Romance's "I Don't Love You". and occasionally performs live with the band.

=== 2022–2023: Second lineup ===
The band gained attention after performing at THON 2022 at Penn State University. This milestone performance began the transition to the next iteration of WOM, beginning with guitarist Emmy Barone in March 2022. The female-led band of Swank and Barone instantly proved successful with the pair's first viral video, a parody of Fountains of Wayne's "Stacy's Mom". This defining video launched the band's distinctive neon green color, and was their first example of a song rewrite, something WOM would become well known for. Guitarist Kyle Reinhart was auditioned by the pair, and played their first show in April at The Red Room at Cafe 939. This lineup continued the band's journey, embarking on a summer 2022 tour, with Shead playing keys. Additionally, they finished recording WOM's debut album, released the following year.

After playing Berklee's Guitar Night at the Berklee Performance Center, Reinhart left the band in November 2022. Swank and Barone returned to the Bryce Jordan Center in February 2023, where Walk On Mars won THON 2023's Battle of the Bands by a fan-voted, 85% margin. THON 2023 marked the final performance with the band for Barone and Shead's last major performance before transitioning into a full-time management role. The band's debut EP PHOBOS was released in March 2023 under the record label Wol’Flower Records, after which Walk On Mars became Mary Jo Swank's solo project.

=== 2023–Present: Transition to solo project and independent artist ===
In May 2023, Walk On Mars' social media accounts began gaining traction, largely due to Swank's lyric rewrites of popular songs. Notably, Swank collaborated with David Michael Frank, who later invited her to open his nationwide Private Party Tour, with Shead joining as the Tour Manager. During the tour, they met the Riot House—a collective of ten independent artists, most notably Jack The Underdog, a frequent collaborator of the band—and Justin VanDommelen. VanDommelen later became WOM's primary live drummer and performed with Walk On Mars at their final THON performance in 2024, receiving overwhelmingly positive reviews.

In February 2024, Walk On Mars experienced a major breakthrough after re-recording their earlier viral Stacy's Mom parody in full. The song, dubbed "Stacy's Side", amassed over 25 million views across TikTok, Instagram, and YouTube. Its widespread appeal led to media coverage and a surge in the band’s following, with many praising the clever spin on the pop-punk classic and its playful take on modern dating dynamics. The success of Stacy’s Side solidified Walk On Mars’ reputation for blending humor, nostalgia, and musicianship while expanding their audience beyond their established fanbase.

In May 2024, Swank graduated from Berklee College of Music, relocating with Shead to Nashville, Tennessee. Having parted ways with Wol’Flower Records, Walk On Mars began independently releasing material, starting with a collaboration with Jack The Underdog, a Swemo (Taylor Swift + Emo) cover of We Are Never Ever Getting Back Together. The band officially launched their next musical era with the release of Voodoo Barbie in September 2024. The track, described as an "anthem for independent women", tackles gender stereotypes and misogyny in the music industry. The following month, Walk On Mars released Fraud, a pop-punk single exploring themes of misplaced trust and personal betrayal. Both songs were produced by Roye Robley, known for his work with bands such as Like A Storm, Meet Me @ The Altar, and Belmont.

In February 2025, all of Walk On Mars' independently released songs were removed from streaming platforms due to a legal dispute but have since been reinstated. Despite the setback, Walk On Mars continues to gain momentum and is a headliner on the Emo Night (Taylor's Version) Tour, which is set to run from March to June 2025.

== Musical style and influences ==
Walk On Mars' sound has been compared to artists like Meet Me @ The Altar and Avril Lavigne. The band's lyrics often address personal and societal themes, delivered with a blend of sharp percussion and electric guitar melodies. Their debut album, PHOBOS (2023), leaned more towards alternative and progressive rock, featuring intricate instrumentation, dynamic tempo shifts, and showcasing a heavier, more complex sound.

In their new era of music, Walk On Mars has shifted toward a more energetic and direct pop-punk style. Having served only as mixing and mastering engineer on PHOBOS, Roye Robley, known for producing Meet Me @ The Altar’s Model Citizen EP and smash single Hit Like a Girl, has taken on a larger role as the producer for all of their new material. His production emphasizes punchy drum patterns, fast-paced guitar riffs, and anthemic choruses, helping define the band's more rebellious and high-energy approach. This sonic shift is evident in their 2024 singles Voodoo Barbie and Fraud, which embrace pop-punk’s raw intensity while retaining Swank's signature storytelling.

== Band members ==
=== Current members ===
- Mary Jo Swank – lead vocals (2021–present)
- Ben Shead – piano, keyboards, backing vocals (2022–present), manager (2021–present)

=== Touring musicians ===
- Justin VanDommelen – drums (2023–2024)
- Kevin Goren – drums (2025–present)
- Tommy Marshall – guitar, bass (2025–present)
- Gabe Sanchez – guitar (2025)
- Joey Caponegro – guitar (2026)
- Tai Hofmeister – drums (2026)

=== Former members ===
- Caleb Board – drums (2021, 2022)
- Chase Leibowitz – guitars (2021–2022)
- Haven Veraguas – keyboards (2021, 2022)
- Nate Bryant – bass (2021, 2022)
- Emmy Barone – guitars, bass (2022–2023)
- Rafi Waters – drums (2022–2023)
- Kyle Reinhart – guitars (2022)

==== Early members ====
- Shawn Gaskill – guitars (2021)
- George Ariza – bass (2021)

== Discography ==
=== Extended Plays ===
PHOBOS (2023)

BE A MAN! (2026)

=== Singles ===
==== As lead artist ====
Title	Year	Album
"New York Beach"	2022	PHOBOS
"When Mars Decides To Fall" (with Haven West Veraguas)	2022	Non-album single
"We Are Never Ever Getting Back Together" (with Jack The Underdog)	2024	Non-album single
"Voodoo Barbie"	2024	BE A MAN!
"Fraud"	2024	BE A MAN!
"Resuscitate" (with joey cxp)	2024	Non-album single
"BE A MAN!"	2026	BE A MAN!
"Castle in Tennessee"	2026	BE A MAN!
"Return of the Living Dead" "Braindead"	2026	Return of the Living Dead
"All I Talk About"	2027	Return of the Living Dead

==== As featured artist ====
Title	Year	Album
"Stay Away" (Mitch Rip featuring Walk On Mars)	2024	Non-album single

=== Promotional singles ===
Year	Title	Album
2023	"Hear Us Now"	PHOBOS
2026	"Crying to Your Mother"	BE A MAN!
