= Phobos =

Phobos (Greek for "fear") most commonly refers to:

- Phobos (moon), a moon of Mars
- Phobos (mythology), the Greek god and personification of fear and panic

Phobos may also refer to:

== Fictional characters ==
- Phobos (Marvel Comics), several characters
- Phobos (Sailor Moon)
- Phobos (W.I.T.C.H.)
- Huitzil or Phobos, a character in the Darkstalkers game series

== Computer programming ==
- Project Phobos, a Java-based web application environment
- A runtime and standard library of D programming language

== Transportation and vehicles ==
- Phobos program, a Soviet space program of the late 1980s
- USS Phobos (AK-129), a World War II U.S. Navy Crater-class cargo ship
- SpaceX Phobos, a floating Starship launch and landing platform

== Other uses ==
- Phobos (album), a 1997 album by Voivod
- PHOBOS, a 2023 album by Walk On Mars
- Phobos (audio drama), a 2007 audio drama based on Doctor Who
- PHOBOS experiment, a nuclear physics experiment

== See also ==
- Phobos Grunt, a Russian mission to Mars and its moon Phobos
- Phoebus (disambiguation)
