= Phoebe =

Phoebe or Phœbe may refer to:

== People and fictional characters ==
- Phoebe (given name), a list of people, mythological, biblical and fictional characters
- Phoebe (mythology), several Greek mythological figures
- Phoebe, an epithet of Artemis/Diana and Selene/Luna, in Greek and Roman mythology, the moon goddesses
- Phoebe (biblical figure), deacon
- Phoebe Buffay, a fictional character from the sitcom television show Friends

== Plants and animals ==
- Phoebe (beetle), a genus of longhorn beetles
- Phoebe (bird), the common name for birds of genus Sayornis
- Phoebe (plant), a genus of flowering plants

== Ships ==
- Phoebe, a sailing ship chartered by the New Zealand Company in 1842
- HMS Phoebe, various ships
- USS Phoebe, two minesweepers

== Other uses ==
- Phoebe (moon), a small outer moon of Saturn
- Phoebe (computer), Acorn Computers' never-released successor to the Risc PC
- Phoebe (George Mason University journal), a literary journal published by George Mason University
- Phoebe, New Zealand, a locality in the Hurunui District
- "Phoebe", a song by Lazlo Bane from their 2006 album, Back Sides
- "Phoebe", a song by Audrey Hobert from their 2025 debut album, Who's the Clown?

== See also ==
- Phebe
- Phoebus (disambiguation)
