= Sun Web Developer Pack =

Open source software

The Sun Web Developer Pack (SWDP) is a collection of open source software released by Sun Microsystems for developing web applications that run on Java EE application servers. The SWDP is targeted at software developers interested in writing web applications that use Web 2.0 technologies such as Ajax, REST, Atom, and JavaScript.

== Software Included in the SWDP ==
The SWDP consists of the following software:

- Scripting language support
  - Project Phobos, a project that allows you to write web applications in JavaScript or other scripting languages
- Ajax technologies
  - Project jMaki, a framework for creating Ajax-enabled web applications in Java, PHP, or Phobos
  - Project Dynamic Faces, a framework for creating Ajax-enabled JavaServer Faces applications
- REST
  - RESTful web services, an API for creating REST web services in Java
  - WADL
- ROME, a Java API for parsing and generating RSS and Atom web feeds
- Atom Server (The ROME Propono subproject), a prototype Java API and framework for creating a web feed server for Atom feeds

== Release history ==
Release 1 of the SWDP was made public on March 12, 2007.
