= Phobos (comics) =

Phobos, in comics, may refer to:

- Phobos (Marvel Comics), a Marvel Comics character and son of Ares
- Phobos (DC Comics), a DC Comics supervillain and enemy of Wonder Woman
- Phobos, a character in Jack Kirby's Galactic Bounty Hunters

== See also ==
- Phobos (disambiguation)
