= Phoebe cornuta =

Scientific classification
- Kingdom: Animalia
- Phylum: Arthropoda
- Clade: Pancrustacea
- Class: Insecta
- Order: Coleoptera
- Suborder: Polyphaga
- Infraorder: Cucujiformia
- Family: Cerambycidae
- Genus: Phoebe
- Species: P. cornuta

Binomial name
- Phoebe cornuta (Olivier, 1795)

Synonyms
- Agapanthia cornuta Audinet-Serville, 1835; Saperda cornuta Olivier, 1795

Species of beetle

Phoebe cornuta is a species of beetle in the family Cerambycidae. It was described by Guillaume-Antoine Olivier in 1795. It is known from French Guiana and Suriname.
