= Susan Elizabeth Phillips =

American novelist

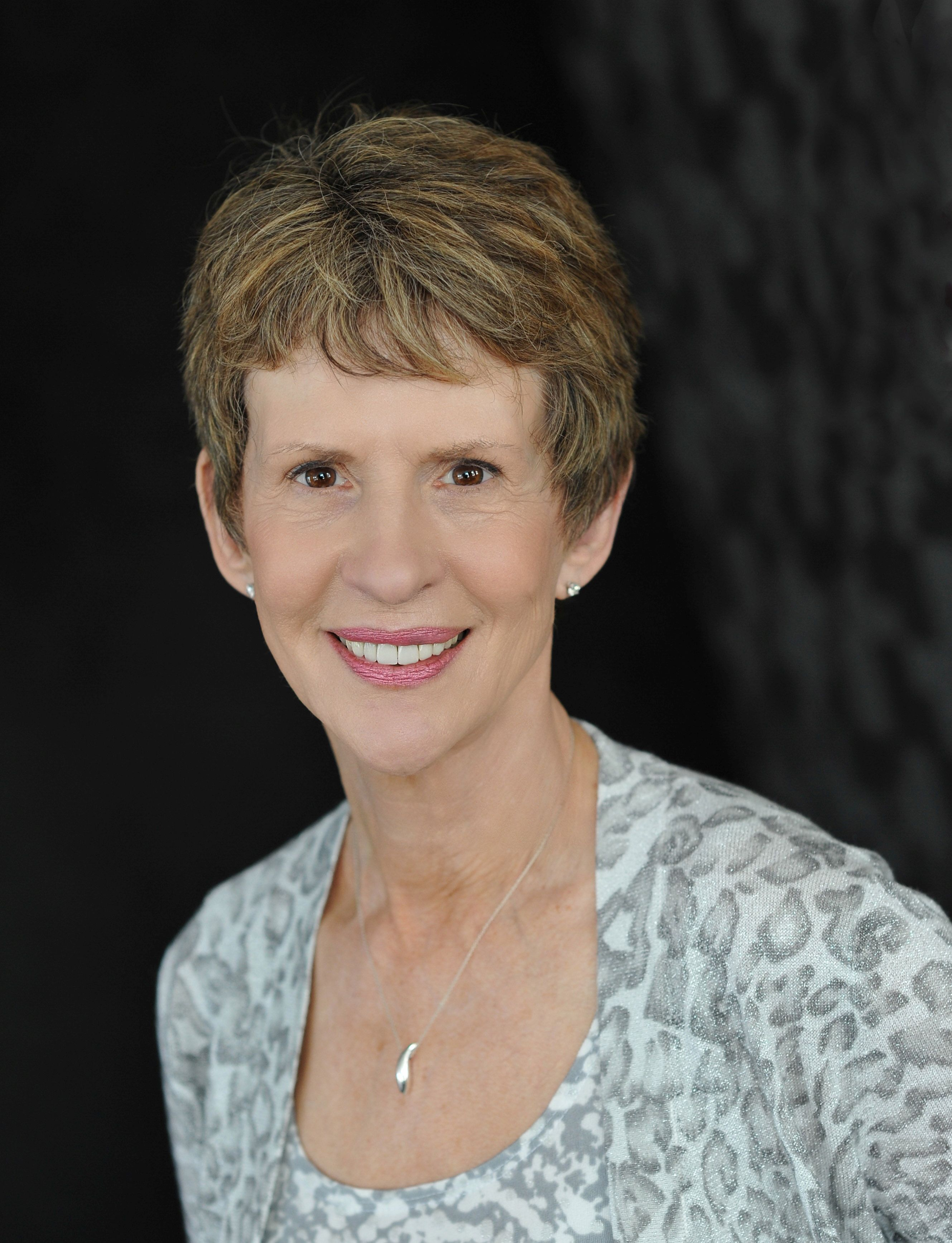
- Born: December 11, 1944 (age 81); Cincinnati, Ohio, U.S.
- Education: Ohio University (BFA)
- Occupation: Novelist
- Writing career
- Period: 1983-present
- Genre: Romance
- Website: susanephillips.com

Susan Elizabeth Phillips (born December 11, 1944, in Cincinnati, Ohio) is a romance novelist from the United States. She is the creator of the sports romance and has been called the "Queen of Romantic Comedy".

== Biography ==
Phillips was born on December 11 in Cincinnati, Ohio to John Aller Titus and Louesa Coate Titus. After receiving a B.F.A. in theater arts from Ohio University, Phillips taught drama, speech, and English at a local high school until her first child was born, then became a stay-at-home mother.

In 1976, the family moved from Ohio to New Jersey. There Phillips and her neighbor, Claire Lefkowitz, often discussed the books they liked to read. Together they wrote a historical romance, The Copeland Bride, which was published in 1983 under the pen name Justine Cole. After Claire and her family moved, Phillips began writing by herself. Her subsequent novels, were published under her own name.

Phillips and her husband, Bill, met on a blind date while in college. They have two grown sons, and live in Chicago, Illinois.

== Bibliography ==
=== Stand-alone novels ===
- The Copeland Bride (1983) (with Claire Kiehl, as Justine Cole)
- Risen, Glory (1984)
- Hot Shot (1991)
- Honey Moon (1993)
- Kiss an Angel (1996)
- Just Imagine (2001) (revised and retitled version of Risen, Glory)
- Breathing Room (2002)
- Ain't She Sweet? (2005)
- Heroes Are My Weakness (2014)
- Dance Away with Me (2020)

=== Chicago Stars series ===
1. It Had To Be You (1994)
2. Heaven, Texas (1995)
3. Nobody's Baby But Mine (1997)
4. Dream a Little Dream (1998)
5. This Heart of Mine (2001)
6. Match Me if You Can (2005)
7. Natural Born Charmer (2007)
8. First Star I See Tonight (2016)
9. When Stars Collide (2021)
10. Simply the Best (2024)
11. And the Crowd Went Wild (2026)

=== Wynette, Texas books ===
- Glitter Baby (original 1987; revised rewrite 2009)
- Fancy Pants (1989)
- Lady Be Good (1999)
- First Lady (2000)
- What I Did For Love (2009)
- Call Me Irresistible (2010)
- The Great Escape (2012)

=== Omnibus ===
- Honey Moon / Hot Shot (2005)
- Nobody's Baby But Mine / This Heart of Mine (2006)

=== Non-fiction ===
- "The Romance and the Empowerment of Women" essay in Dangerous Men and Adventurous Women: Romance Writers on the Appeal of the Romance (1992, ISBN 0-8122-3192-9, 0-8122-1411-0)

== Awards and reception ==
Phillips is the only five-time winner of the Romance Writers of America Favorite Book of the Year Award. In 2001, she was inducted into the Romance Writers Hall of Fame and in 2006 was a recipient of the Romance Writers of America's Lifetime Achievement Award.

- It Had to Be You: 1995 Rita Awards Best Novel winner
- Nobody's Baby But Mine: 1998 Rita Awards Best Novel winner
- Dream a Little Dream: 1999 Rita Awards Best Novel winner
- First Lady: 2001 Rita Awards Best Novel winner
- Natural Born Charmer - Quill Award nominee for best romance of 2007
- 2008 - RUSA Reading List for Romance for Natural Born Charmer
- Call Me Irresistible: Named by Library Journal as one of the best romance books of 2011, Top 10 Romance Fiction 2011 Booklist Online, RT Reviewers Choice Best Book Awards 2011 Contemporary Romance Nominee
- 2014 - Library Journal Top Ten Best Romances of 2014 – Heroes Are My Weakness
