= Phoebe phoebe =

Scientific classification
- Domain: Eukaryota
- Kingdom: Animalia
- Phylum: Arthropoda
- Class: Insecta
- Order: Coleoptera
- Suborder: Polyphaga
- Infraorder: Cucujiformia
- Family: Cerambycidae
- Tribe: Hemilophini
- Genus: Phoebe
- Species: P. phoebe

Binomial name
- Phoebe phoebe (Lepeletier & Audinet-Serville, 1825)

Synonyms
- Agapanthia octomaculata Audinet-Serville, 1835; Phoebe cretifera Pascoe, 1858; Phoebe octomaculata Thomson, 1864; Saperda phoebe Lepeletier & Audinet-Serville in Latreille, 1825

Species of beetle

Phoebe phoebe is a species of beetle in the family Cerambycidae. It was described by Amédée Louis Michel Lepeletier and Jean Guillaume Audinet-Serville in 1825. It is known from Brazil.
