= Phoebe goiana =

Scientific classification
- Kingdom: Animalia
- Phylum: Arthropoda
- Class: Insecta
- Order: Coleoptera
- Suborder: Polyphaga
- Infraorder: Cucujiformia
- Family: Cerambycidae
- Genus: Phoebe
- Species: P. goiana

Binomial name
- Phoebe goiana Lane, 1966

Species of beetle

Phoebe goiana is a species of beetle in the family Cerambycidae. Lane described it in 1966. It is known from Brazil.
