= Phoebe alba =

Scientific classification
- Domain: Eukaryota
- Kingdom: Animalia
- Phylum: Arthropoda
- Class: Insecta
- Order: Coleoptera
- Suborder: Polyphaga
- Infraorder: Cucujiformia
- Family: Cerambycidae
- Tribe: Hemilophini
- Genus: Phoebe
- Species: P. alba

Binomial name
- Phoebe alba Martins & Galileo, 2004

Species of beetle

Phoebe alba is a species of beetle in the family Cerambycidae. It was described by Martins and Galileo in 2004. It is known from Bolivia.
