= Phoebe spegazzinii =

Scientific classification
- Domain: Eukaryota
- Kingdom: Animalia
- Phylum: Arthropoda
- Class: Insecta
- Order: Coleoptera
- Suborder: Polyphaga
- Infraorder: Cucujiformia
- Family: Cerambycidae
- Tribe: Hemilophini
- Genus: Phoebe
- Species: P. spegazzinii

Binomial name
- Phoebe spegazzinii Bruch, 1908

Species of beetle

Phoebe spegazzinii is a species of beetle in the family Cerambycidae. It was described by Bruch in 1908. It is known from Argentina, Brazil and Paraguay.
