= Phoebe subalbaria =

Scientific classification
- Domain: Eukaryota
- Kingdom: Animalia
- Phylum: Arthropoda
- Class: Insecta
- Order: Coleoptera
- Suborder: Polyphaga
- Infraorder: Cucujiformia
- Family: Cerambycidae
- Tribe: Hemilophini
- Genus: Phoebe
- Species: P. subalbaria

Binomial name
- Phoebe subalbaria Belon, 1896

Species of beetle

Phoebe subalbaria is a species of beetle in the family Cerambycidae. It was described by Belon in 1896. It is known from Bolivia and Brazil.
