= Phoebe luteola =

Scientific classification
- Domain: Eukaryota
- Kingdom: Animalia
- Phylum: Arthropoda
- Class: Insecta
- Order: Coleoptera
- Suborder: Polyphaga
- Infraorder: Cucujiformia
- Family: Cerambycidae
- Tribe: Hemilophini
- Genus: Phoebe
- Species: P. luteola

Binomial name
- Phoebe luteola Bates, 1881

Species of beetle

Phoebe luteola is a species of beetle in the family Cerambycidae. It was described by Henry Walter Bates in 1881. It is known from Guatemala.
