= The Library Window =

1896 short story by Margaret Oliphant

- Short story by Margaret Oliphant

Text available at Wikisource
- Country: United Kingdom
- Language: English
- Genre: Ghost story

Publication
- Published in: Blackwood's Magazine
- Media type: Print
- Publication date: January 1896

The Library Window is a short story by the Scottish author Margaret Oliphant. It was first published in Blackwood's Magazine in January 1896. In 1902, it was collected in Oliphant's book Stories of the Seen and the Unseen.

It is a ghost story where the protagonist is fascinated by a window at her aunt's house in which she sees the ghost of a young, murdered writer. It was one of Oliphant's most controversial stories. Modern interpretations consider it a statement of the oppressive conditions for women in the late Victorian period.
