= Phoebe pictilis =

Scientific classification
- Kingdom: Animalia
- Phylum: Arthropoda
- Class: Insecta
- Order: Coleoptera
- Suborder: Polyphaga
- Infraorder: Cucujiformia
- Family: Cerambycidae
- Genus: Phoebe
- Species: P. pictilis

Binomial name
- Phoebe pictilis Lane, 1972

Synonyms
- Leucophoebe pictilis (Lane, 1972)

Species of beetle

Phoebe pictilis is a species of beetle in the family Cerambycidae. It was described by Lane in 1972. It is known from Colombia and Ecuador.
