= Nobody's Baby But Mine =

Book by Susan Elizabeth Phillips

- Author: Susan Elizabeth Phillips
- Language: English
- Genre: Contemporary romance
- Publisher: Avon Books
- Publication date: 1997
- Media type: Print
- Preceded by: Kiss an Angel
- Followed by: Dream a Little Dream

Nobody's Baby But Mine is a romance novel written by Susan Elizabeth Phillips and published in 1997. It may be categorized as baby love romance. It is the third book in her Chicago Stars series.

== Plot summary ==
Physics professor Jane Darlington decides on her 34th birthday that the time has come to have the baby that she's always wanted, even though there's no man in her life. Hoping to help the child avoid her own social awkwardness as a result of her high intelligence, she seeks out a father who's on the stupid side, hoping the combination will produce a child of normal intelligence. As she doesn't want to use a sperm bank, she settles on famous Chicago Stars quarterback Cal Bonner. After tricking Cal into believing she is a prostitute, Jane manages to become pregnant, at the second attempt, with help from a sabotaged condom. However, Cal turns out to be much smarter than she thought. He also doesn't want to have a child out of wedlock. The book ends with the two happily married.

== Reception and awards ==
It was the 1998 RITA Awards Best Novel winner.
