= Phoebe albaria =

Scientific classification
- Kingdom: Animalia
- Phylum: Arthropoda
- Class: Insecta
- Order: Coleoptera
- Suborder: Polyphaga
- Infraorder: Cucujiformia
- Family: Cerambycidae
- Genus: Phoebe
- Species: P. albaria

Binomial name
- Phoebe albaria (Bates, 1872)

Synonyms
- Amphionycha albaria Bates, 1872; Hemilophus albarius (Bates, 1872); Leucophoebe albaria (Bates, 1872)

Species of beetle

Phoebe albaria is a species of beetle in the family Cerambycidae. It was described by Henry Walter Bates in 1872. It is known from Colombia and Nicaragua.
