= Miss Marjoribanks =

1866 novel by Margaret Oliphant

- Author: Margaret Oliphant
- Language: English
- Publication date: 1866

Miss Marjoribanks is an 1866 novel by Margaret Oliphant. It was first published in serialised form in Blackwood's Edinburgh Magazine from February 1865. It follows the exploits of its heroine, Lucilla Marjoribanks, as she schemes to improve the social life of the provincial English town of Carlingford.

== Characters ==
- Miss Lucilla Marjoribanks (Pronounced the way it is spelt; late in the novel she tells her cousin that it was originally pronounced March-Banks) – The heroine of the story. She ostensibly aspires to make her papa happy and finds the idea of courting to be unimportant at this moment in her life.
- Dr. Marjoribanks – Lucilla's father. He sent her back to boarding school after her invalid mother's funeral, because she was only 15 and he was quite self-sufficient. When she returned, after having done a European tour, she takes charge of the household. He admires the way she has outwitted him and is proud of her success in society and is amused to see how she deals with minor setbacks.
- Tom Marjoribanks – Lucilla's cousin on her father's side. They grew up in each other's company. He loves Lucilla but she does not reciprocate his feelings, and he goes to India for several years.
- Mr. Cavendish – The only man capable of flirting at parties.
- Nancy – Dr. Marjoribanks' cook. Sometimes competes with Lucilla for authority in the house. Usually fails.
- Barbara Lake – Has the perfect singing voice to complement Lucilla at her at homes but is lower in the social scale and resents Lucilla and actively schemes to get Mr Cavendish's attention.
- Rose Lake – Barbara's younger sister. Works at the school of design. Takes art very seriously. Pre-Raphaelite.
- Mr. Lake – drawing master of the town. Widower. Many young children left in his care. Blissfully ignorant of his daughter's interest in Mr Cavendish.
- Mr Ashburton taken up by Lucilla as the next Parliamentary candidate, in opposition to Mr Cavendish
- Mrs. Centum.
- Mrs. Woodburn – Enjoys imitation. Sister to Mr. Cavendish. Not very social but very observant.
- Mrs. Chiley – Old. Married to Colonel. No children. Takes a motherly role in Lucilla's life and becomes a confidant.
- Miss Martha Blount – Miss Marjoribanks' school teacher.
- Ellis – Mrs. Marjoribanks' maid.
- Mr. Bury – rector

== Adaptations ==
BBC Radio 4 produced a four-part radio adaptation first broadcast on 4 August 1992, dramatized by Elizabeth Proud and featuring Elizabeth Spriggs as Margaret Oliphant and Teresa Gallagher as Lucilla Marjoribanks.

== Reception ==
The late nineteenth century English novelist George Gissing, who read the novel in September 1896, thought it "excellent".

The modern writer Zach Weinersmith described it in 2026 as having "one of the strongest character-defining openers I've ever read" with a "bunch of characters established unforgettably and actual laughs."
