= Phebe =

Phebe is a feminine given name related to Phoebe. It may refer to:

- Phebe Bekker (born 2005), British ice dancer
- Phebe Gibbes (died 1805), English novelist and early feminist
- Phebe Ann Coffin Hanaford (1829-1921), Christian Universalist minister, biographer and activist for universal suffrage and women's rights
- Phebe Hayes, American independent historian of Iberia Parish, Louisiana; former professor of speech pathology
- Phebe Hemphill (born 1960), American sculptor who works for the United States Mint
- Phebe Marr (born 1931), American historian and retired professor
- Phebe Novakovic (born 1957), American businesswoman, chairwoman and chief executive officer of General Dynamics
- Phebe Starr (fl. 2010-present), Australian singer and songwriter
- Phebe Sudlow (1831-1922), first female superintendent of a United States public school and first female professor at the University of Iowa
- Phebe Watson (1876-1964), South Australian teacher and educator

== Fictional characters ==
- Phebe, in Shakespeare's play As You Like It
- Phebe, in the 17th century play A Mad Couple Well-Match'd by Richard Brome
