= The Wizard's Son =

The Wizard's Son is an 1884 novel by Mrs. Oliphant. It is supernatural and realistic fiction, concerning the young son of a widow. It was published as a serial in Macmillan's Magazine in seventeen installments from November 1882 through March 1884.
