= Past // Present // Future =

Studio album by Meet Me at the Altar
- Released: March 10, 2023
- Recorded: April–November 2022
- Genre: Pop punk
- Length: 30:05
- Label: Fueled by Ramen
- Producer: John Fields

Meet Me at the Altar chronology
Model Citizen (2021)	Past // Present // Future (2023)	Worried Sick (2025)

Singles from Past // Present // Future
- 1. "Say It (To My Face)" Released: September 30, 2022; 2. "Kool" Released: February 21, 2023

Past // Present // Future is the second studio album by American pop punk band Meet Me at the Altar. It was released on March 10, 2023.

== Background and recording ==
After signing to Fueled by Ramen and releasing their debut EP on a major record label, Model Citizen (2021), the band initially planned to release their debut album in 2022. However, by June 2022, despite recording progressing well, the album was pushed back to early 2023. The band worked with music producer John Fields and collaborated with writer and producer John Ryan on the album as well.

== Themes and composition ==
The band described the album and its title as "pay[ing] homage to the music we loved growing up while reflecting our modern-day lives, sounds, and experiences". The band's influences in creating the album include Paramore, Pink, and Fall Out Boy. The albums' first single and album opener have been described as a pop punk "diss track" aimed at critics who aren't giving them a chance in the music industry.

== Release and promotion ==
The album's first single, "Say It (To My Face)", was released in September 2022, well in advance of the album. Towards the end of 2022, the song was used in a Taco Bell television ad. The album's release date and name was revealed in January 2023, on an episode of The Late Show With Stephen Colbert, where the band also performed "Say It (To My Face)" live as well. A North American tour to support the album is scheduled across March and April 2023. A deluxe edition with four additional tracks was released on September 29, 2023.

== Reception ==
Professional ratings
Aggregate scores
Source	Rating
AnyDecentMusic?	7.2/10
Metacritic	69/100
Review scores
Source	Rating
Clash	4/10
DIY	4/5 stars
The Guardian	3/5 stars
Gigwise	8/10
Kerrang!	4/5
The Line of Best Fit	7/10
NME	4/5 stars

The album was listed on Consequence's most anticipated albums of 2023 list, along with the band being named one of the publication's "15 Rising Artists to Watch in 2023" because of the release.

In June 2023, Alternative Press published an unranked list of the top 25 albums of the year to date and included this release, calling it "a punk-infused, optimistic outlook that is peppered with guitar riffs and contains all the ingredients a great pop-punk album needs to succeed: catchy diss tracks, breakup ballads, and flirty hooks".

== Track listing ==
Past // Present // Future track listing
No.	Title	Writer(s)	Length
1.	"Say It (To My Face)"	Téa Campbell; Edith Victoria; John Ryan; Steph Jones	2:39
2.	"Try"	Campbell; Victoria; Ryan; Kendrick Nicholls; Sherwyn Nicholls	3:03
3.	"Kool"	Campbell; Victoria; Ryan; Jones	2:11
4.	"T.M.I"	Campbell; Victoria; Ryan; Daniel Dodd Wilson	2:45
5.	"Same Language"	Campbell; Victoria; Ryan; S. Nicholls	2:34
6.	"A Few Tomorrows"	Campbell; Victoria; Ryan; Rachel West	2:52
7.	"Need Me"	Campbell; Victoria	2:57
8.	"It's Over for Me"	Campbell; Victoria; Ryan; Jones	2:21
9.	"Thx 4 Nothin'"	Campbell; Victoria; Tommy English; Emma Rosen	2:43
10.	"Rocket Science"	Campbell; Victoria; West; Nico Stadi	3:34
11.	"King of Everything"	Campbell; Victoria; Ryan	2:26
Total length:			30:05

Deluxe Edition track listing
No.	Title	Writer(s)	Length
12.	"Give It Up"	Téa Campbell; Edith Victoria; John Ryan; Steph Jones	2:56
13.	"Take Me Away"		3:07
14.	"Strangers"	Campbell; Victoria; Ryan; Jones	2:54
15.	"Changes"	Campbell; Victoria; Ryan; Daniel Dodd Wilson	2:30
Total length:			41:17

== Personnel ==
- Edith Johnson – vocals
- Tea Campbell – guitar, bass
- Ada Juarez – drums

== Release history ==
Release history and formats for Past // Present // Future
Region	Date	Format(s)	Label	Ref.
Various	March 10, 2023	CD; digital download; streaming	Fueled by Ramen	
