= Phoebe bicornis =

Scientific classification
- Kingdom: Animalia
- Phylum: Arthropoda
- Clade: Pancrustacea
- Class: Insecta
- Order: Coleoptera
- Suborder: Polyphaga
- Infraorder: Cucujiformia
- Family: Cerambycidae
- Genus: Phoebe
- Species: P. bicornis

Binomial name
- Phoebe bicornis (Olivier, 1795)

Synonyms
- Agapanthia bicornis Audinet-Serville, 1835; Amphionycha bicornis Bates, 1866; Saperda bicornis Olivier, 1795

Species of beetle

Phoebe bicornis is a species of beetle in the family Cerambycidae. It was described by Guillaume-Antoine Olivier in 1795. It is known from Brazil and French Guiana.
