= Phoebe kempfi =

Scientific classification
- Kingdom: Animalia
- Phylum: Arthropoda
- Class: Insecta
- Order: Coleoptera
- Suborder: Polyphaga
- Infraorder: Cucujiformia
- Family: Cerambycidae
- Genus: Phoebe
- Species: P. kempfi

Binomial name
- Phoebe kempfi (Lane, 1976)

Synonyms
- Leucophoebe kempfi Lane, 1976

Species of beetle

Phoebe kempfi is a species of beetle in the family Cerambycidae. It was described by Lane in 1976. It is known from Ecuador.
