= Phoebus (disambiguation) =

Phoebus is an epithet of Apollo, one of the Olympian deities in Greek and Roman mythology

Phoebus may also refer to:

== Mythology ==
- Helios, Greek god and personification of the sun.
- Sol (Roman mythology)

== People ==
=== Given name ===
- Francis Phoebus (c. 1469-1483), king of Navarre
- Phoebus (songwriter) (born 1971), Greek composer
- Phoebus Levene (1869-1940), American biochemist
- Phoebus of Lusignan (15th century), Marshal of Armenia

=== Surname ===
- Gaston Phoebus (14th century), 11th count of Foix
- Harrison Phoebus (1840–1886), American entrepreneur
- Samuel ben Uri Shraga Phoebus (17th century), Polish rabbi
- Tom Phoebus (born 1942), starting pitcher in Major League Baseball

== Other uses ==
- Phoebus (lichen), a genus of fungus
- Phoebus (planet), a fictional planet in the computer game Exile
- Phoebus, Virginia, United States
- Phoebus cartel, a cartel that existed to control the manufacture and sale of light bulbs
- Phoebus High School, Hampton, Virginia, United States
- Bölkow Phoebus, an early glass-fibre glider made by Bölkow GmbH, Germany in the 1960s
- Bright Phoebus, an album by Mike and Lal Waterson
- Bristol Phoebus, a prototype jet engine of 1949
- Captain Phoebus, a fictional character from The Hunchback of Notre Dame
- a poetic term for the Sun
- a nuclear thermal rocket engine developed in the 60s by Project Rover

== See also ==
- Phobos (disambiguation)
- Phöbus, a literary journal
- Phoebe (disambiguation)
- Phoebis, a butterfly genus
