= Phoebe concinna =

Scientific classification
- Domain: Eukaryota
- Kingdom: Animalia
- Phylum: Arthropoda
- Class: Insecta
- Order: Coleoptera
- Suborder: Polyphaga
- Infraorder: Cucujiformia
- Family: Cerambycidae
- Tribe: Hemilophini
- Genus: Phoebe
- Species: P. concinna

Binomial name
- Phoebe concinna White, 1856

Synonyms
- Amphionycha concinna Bates, 1866

Species of beetle

Phoebe concinna is a species of beetle in the family Cerambycidae. It was described by White in 1856. It is known from Brazil, Colombia and Ecuador.
