= Squire Arden =

1871 novel by Margaret Oliphant

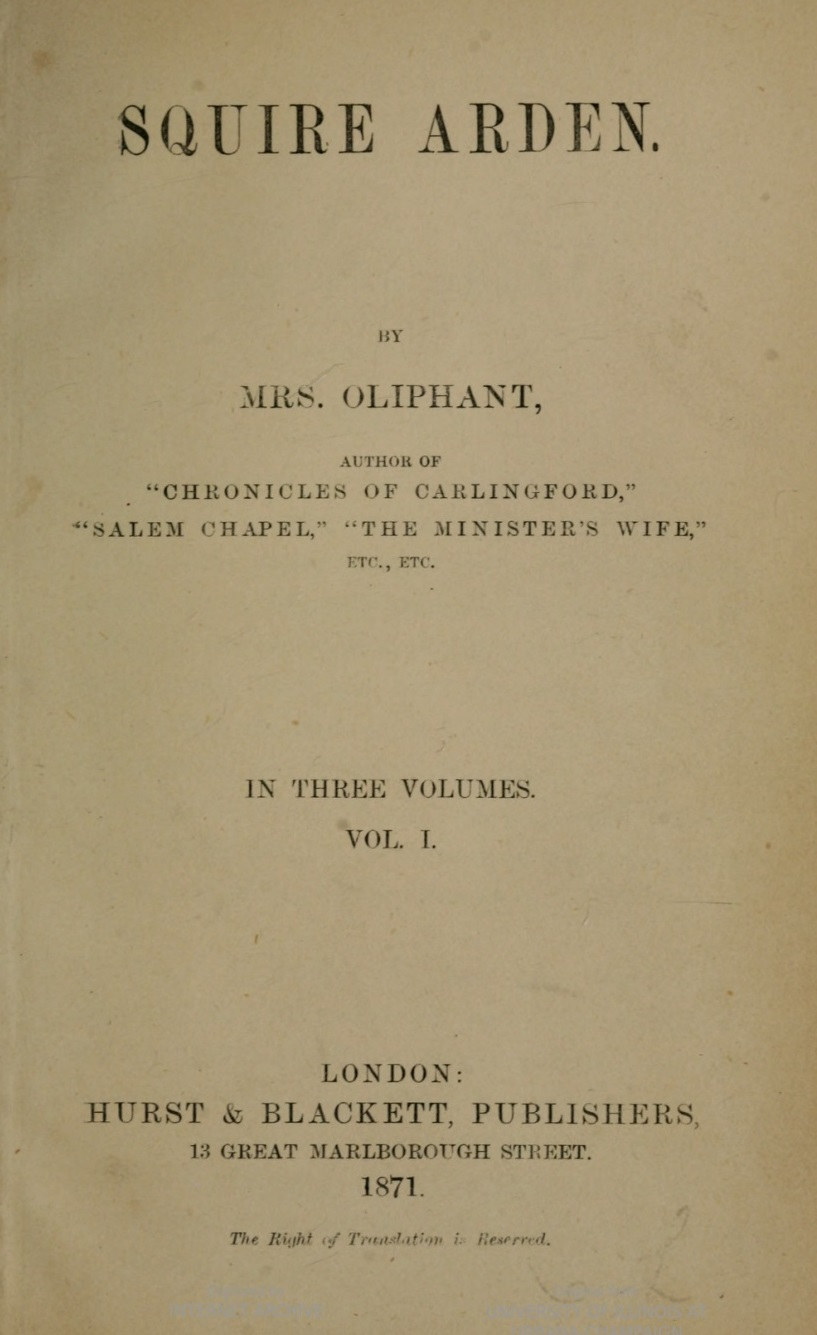
- Title page of the first edition.
- Author: Margaret Oliphant
- Language: English
- Publisher: Hurst & Blackett
- Publication date: 1871
- Publication place: England

Squire Arden is a novel by Margaret Oliphant published in 1871.

== Plot ==
The plot follows the story of Squire Edgar Arden of Arden, his sister Clare, and their poor cousin Arthur Arden. Squire Edgar is a model landlord and brother, but looks and acts nothing like the rest of the Arden family. Edgar's father, the old Squire, had mysteriously treated him with contempt until his death, raising doubts in some members of the community about Edgar's legitimacy. Arthur Arden, the charming ne'er-do-well cousin whose father had a longstanding feud with the old Squire, is pursuing Clare, who has once refused his proposal of marriage. To complicate matters, Arthur also hears of the rumors about Edgar's legitimacy and hopes he will be able to prove his claim to inherit Arden. In the end, the mystery of Edgar's past is revealed, with the aid of old letters hidden in a bureau and a visitor who is unusually interested in the Ardens' lives.
