= Model Citizen =

2021 EP by Meet Me at the Altar

EP by Meet Me at the Altar
- Released: August 13, 2021
- Studio: Roye Robley (Hammond)
- Genres: Pop-punk; easycore
- Length: 19:22
- Label: Fueled by Ramen
- Producer: Roye Robley

Meet Me at the Altar chronology
Bigger Than Me (2019)	Model Citizen (2021)	Past // Present // Future (2023)

Singles from Model Citizen
- 1. "Feel a Thing" Released: June 16, 2021; 2. "Brighter Days (Are Before Us)" Released: July 30, 2021

Model Citizen is the fourth extended play by the American pop-punk band Meet Me at the Altar, released on August 13, 2021. It is the band's first release with the label Fueled by Ramen, whom they signed to in October 2020. Recorded with producer Roye Robley at his studio in Hammond, Indiana, it is a pop-punk and easycore release centered on themes of coming-of-age and self-improvement. The band wrote most of the EP's material a week before it was due in to their label.

Model Citizen received critical acclaim and was listed as one of the best EPs of 2021 by BrooklynVegan, Exclaim!, Kerrang!, Loudwire and NME. The EP was supported by the singles "Feel a Thing" and "Brighter Days (Are Before Us)", and tours with Coheed and Cambria, The Used, nothing,nowhere and All Time Low. An acoustic version of the EP was released in March 2022.

== Background and recording ==
Meet Me at the Altar formed in 2015 by guitarist Téa Campbell and drummer Ada Juarez. Both members met online, after Campbell commented on a YouTube video of Juarez covering the Paramore song "All I Wanted". Vocalist Edith Victoria joined the band in September 2017. Meet Me at the Altar's first two releases with Victoria, the extended plays Changing States (2018) and Bigger than Me (2019), brought the band to the attention of Johnny Minardi, the vice president of A&R at Elektra Music Group. In May 2020, the band released the single "Garden", after which their profile rose rapidly. At the urging of Dan Campbell of The Wonder Years and Alex Gaskarth of All Time Low, Minardi signed Meet Me at the Altar to Fueled by Ramen in October 2020. That same month, the members of Meet Me at the Altar moved into a house together in Florida; by November, they were working on a new EP.

Meet Me at the Altar were given seven to eight months to write Model Citizen. Aside from Victoria and Campbell working together on lyrics, the band's members continued to write material individually before they came together with their parts; Campbell said that "instead of being states apart, we were just rooms apart". In March 2021, Meet Me at the Altar released the single "Hit Like a Girl". Although they had written material for an EP by then, the band felt the need to match the single's energy and decided to write a more cohesive set of songs from scratch a week before they were due to hand the EP in to Fueled by Ramen; their new material showed heavier easycore influences. "Mapped Out", "Brighter Days (Are Before Us)" and "Wake Up" were written during this period. Juarez said that although she was worried when Victoria and Campbell decided to redo the EP, she trusted them and was confident that their songs would sound good. The band recorded Model Citizen at the studio of producer and past collaborator Roye Robley in Hammond, Indiana. Robley convinced them to keep "Never Gonna Change" on the EP.

== Composition and lyrics ==
The whole concept of Model Citizen is this ideal person in society, I feel like everyone tries to live up to that in a way and it's kind of impossible to actually live up to. Growing up is the struggle of wanting to be that but realising you can't and learning to cope with it and accepting yourself.

— Téa Campbell

Model Citizen is a pop-punk and easycore release. Meet Me at the Altar described its sound as "heavy easycore"; Victoria said that the band aimed to combine their easycore sound with that of artists including Kelly Clarkson, Demi Lovato, Pink and Kesha. Laviea Thomas of Clash described it as blending elements of easycore and punk with 2010s pop music. Its songs juxtapose heavier elements with melodic ones, and feature easycore-inspired breakdowns. Lyrically, the EP is centered on themes of coming-of-age, which the band's members found interesting as they all came of age during the COVID-19 pandemic, and self-improvement. Gigwise's Vicky Greer considered it a "portrait of the modern burdens that young people face". In an interview with Spin, Campbell said that its overall message is to accept not being okay whilst still working to improve yourself and maintain hope for the future, "because that's what keeps literally everyone going."

"Feel a Thing" opens with electronic notes reminiscent of 1980s video games, before moving into distorted guitar riffs matching the same notes, progressing into upbeat and optimistic vocals, large drum beats, and fast guitar work. Tatiana Tenreyro of The A.V. Club highlighted the song's combination of heavier, nu metal-influenced guitars with a pop-punk styled chorus. Its lyrics are about the need to obtain self-awareness in order to change things in one's life. "Mapped Out" is about the uncertainty of young adulthood, and directionlessless in life. Jake Richardson of Kerrang! described it as "headbang-inducing". "Brighter Days (Are Before Us)" is about staying optimistic about the future, and was inspired by feelings of nostalgia during the COVID-19 pandemic. Ashley Wolfgang of Them compared the song to Paramore's "For a Pessimist, I'm Pretty Optimistic" in that they both "glorify the highs and lows of being a young person", but felt that Victoria was "committed to convincing herself that everything will work out in the end". "Now or Never" combines "honey-sweet" vocals and soaring choruses with hard-hitting riffs. Its lyrics detail a strained relationship and ask the listener to decide whether they want to maintain it or move on. "Never Gonna Change" presents a heavy emo sound and is about taking accountability for bad habits, whilst "Wake Up" is about deciding to change and improve oneself.

== Release and promotion ==
On June 16, 2021, Meet Me at the Altar announced Model Citizen and released "Feel a Thing" as its lead single. An accompanying music video, themed around video games and arcades, was released concurrently. An acoustic version, featuring Dan Campbell, was released on July 9. "Brighter Days (Are Before Us)" was released as the EP's second single on July 30, 2021, alongside a music video directed by Sydney Ostrander. Two days prior, the band performed both of the EP's singles and "Now or Never" for NME's "Home Sessions". Model Citizen was released on August 13, 2021. On October 8, 2021, Meet Me at the Altar released a music video for "Now or Never". An acoustic version of Model Citizen was released on March 11, 2022.

To promote the EP, Meet Me at the Altar toured as a supporting act on Coheed and Cambria and The Used's co-headling North America tour, from August 27 to September 19, 2021. From September 21 to September 28, the band played their first shows in the United Kingdom opening for All Time Low. Meet Me at the Altar played four shows with nothing,nowhere in early October 2021 before both bands joined as supporting acts for All Time Low on a tour of North America. Although the tour was due to end on November 12, Meet Me at the Altar and nothing,nowhere split from the tour on October 27, after All Time Low was accused of sexual misconduct on social media; the allegations were reported as false in 2024. Both bands formed their own tour that lasted from October 28 to November 2, 2021.

== Critical reception ==
Professional ratings
Aggregate scores
Source	Rating
AnyDecentMusic?	7.7/10
Metacritic	85/100
Review scores
Source	Rating
Clash	9/10
DIY	4/5 stars
Dork	4/5
Gigwise	8/10
Kerrang!	4/5
The Line of Best Fit	7/10
NME	4/5 stars
Sputnikmusic	3.6/5

On the review aggregator website Metacritic, Model Citizen holds a score of 85 out of 100, based on seven reviews, indicating "universal acclaim". Allie Gregory of Exclaim! said the EP "packs more ambition, power and energy into its rapid-fire 20-minute runtime than any pop-punk release in recent memory." Andrew Sacher of BrooklynVegan felt it displayed Meet Me at the Altar as "a band [...] [pushing] the genre forward, with a fresh perspective and a fresh sound". Dork's Dan Harrison called its songs "razor-sharp future anthems that both recall the legends of pop-punk past, but also herald in a new, more fitting era." NME's Jenessa Williams called the EP a "cohesive celebration of everything that is great about pop-punk", but said that "to constantly tie [Meet Me at the Altar] to the regrets of yesteryear is to deny what is painfully obvious; Model Citizen is the work of a band who are absolutely for the now". Sputnikmusic staff reviewer Rowan5215 viewed the EP as neither a "challenging or boundary-breaking release" in the 2020s pop-punk revival when compared to KennyHoopla and Travis Barker's Survivor's Guilt: The Mixtape (2021), but nevertheless believed it would be enjoyable for fans of the genre.

Gigwise's Greer praised Meet Me at the Altar's overall improvements from their previous output on Model Citizen and felt that its members' "technical prowess" made the band one of the best in the pop-punk scene. Ben Tipple of DIY said the EP's songs were "boisterous as they are infectious", whilst Thomas of Clash praised its catchiness and felt it displayed some of the band's best work to date. Caleb Campbell of The Line of Best Fit praised the band's sincerity and songwriting though felt their "consistent upbeat[ness]" meant they were "largely operating repetitively throughout" the EP. Paolo Ragusa of Consequence felt that Meet Me at the Altar succeeded in mixing "hardcore sensibilities with a modern pop twist" but at the same time limited themselves through their "insistence" on combining pop-punk and easycore. Richardson of Kerrang! also acknowledged the lack of variation from the band's "core" sound but said: "[W]hen the songs just work and everything sounds so fun, it feels rather greedy to ask for more."

Model Citizen was listed as the second-best EP of 2021 by Kerrang!, with BrooklynVegan, Exclaim!, Loudwire, and NME including it in their equivalent lists. Autostraddle gave it an "honorable mention" on its list of 2021's "Best Albums Released by Queer and Trans Artists".

== Track listing ==
All songs are written by Edith Victoria and Téa Campell.

Model Citizen track listing
No.	Title	Length
1.	"Feel a Thing"	3:26
2.	"Mapped Out"	2:50
3.	"Brighter Days (Are Before Us)"	3:03
4.	"Now or Never"	3:21
5.	"Never Gonna Change"	3:31
6.	"Wake Up"	3:10
Total length:		19:22

== Personnel ==
Personnel per Tidal.

- Edith Victoria - vocals
- Téa Campbell - guitar, bass
- Ada Juarez - drums
- Roye Robley - production, mixing, mastering
