= Helena Boguszewska =

Polish writer (1883–1978)

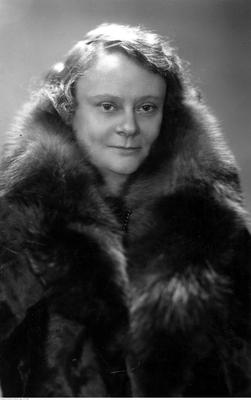
- Born: Helena Radlińska; 18 October 1883; Warsaw, Congress Poland
- Died: 11 November 1978 (aged 95); Warsaw, Poland
- Occupations: Writer, journalist

Helena Boguszewska, née Radlińska (1883–1978) was a Polish writer, columnist and a social activist.

== Early life ==
She was born on 18 October 1883, in Warsaw, as Helena Radlińska. Her father was scholar Ignacy Radliński who studied religions, especially the origins of Christianity. Helena received a university education.

== Career ==
Helena Boguszewska wrote prose documenting the life of the working class, as well as psychological fiction. She wrote reportages, novels, short stories, radio novels and works for children and young adults. Additionally, she wrote several novels with her husband Jerzy Kornacki, such as Wisła (1935). Its screen adaptation, Ludzie Wisły, was directed in 1938 by Aleksander Ford and Jerzy Zarzycki, starring Stanisława Wysocka, Ina Benita and Jerzy Pichelski.

Together with Kornacki, Boguszewska stood behind the idea of creating the Przedmieście literary group, which operated in the 1930s in Warsaw and Lviv. The aim of the collective was to focus on writing about the life of the working class, often by employing journalistic or sociological methods of research. Among the members of the group, which consisted only of prose writers, were Gustaw Morcinek, Zofia Nałkowska and Halina Krahelska.

Boguszewska also engaged in activism, striving for equality and social justice.

In 1944, Boguszewska joined Polish Committee of National Liberation and State National Council.

After World War II, Boguszewska refused to follow the socialist realism doctrine in her writing, which led to challenges in the publishing industry. Her 1947 novel The Iron Curtain, while praised by Soviet critics for its subject showing the divide between members of the family that lived on the opposite sides of the curtain, was criticised for not following Soviet ideology of the times, like giving a political commentary praising Soviet forces. Boguszewska continued to write, penning for example two autobiographical works: Nigdy nie zapomnę (1946) and Czekamy na życie (1947). In 1969, her novel Całe życie Sabiny was adapted as a TV play directed by Jerzy Antczak.

Boguszewska died on 11 November 1978, in Warsaw.

== Selected works ==
- Co się należy wszystkim dzieciom, 1928
- Dziecko na wsi, 1928
- Dziecko w domu, 1928
- Świat po niewidomemu, 1932
- Ci ludzie, 1932
- Czerwone węże, 1933
- Całe życie Sabiny, 1934
- Za zielonym wałem, 1934
- Dzieci znikąd, 1935
- Anielcia i życie, 1938
- Żelazna kurtyna, 1949
- Nigdy nie zapomnę, 1946
- Czekamy na życie, 1947
- Dzieci znikąd, 1934

=== with Jerzy Kornacki ===
- Jadą wozy z cegłą, 1935
- Wisła, 1935
- Polonez cycle (vol. 1–4), 1936–1939
- Zielone lato 1934, 1959
