= It Had to Be You (novel) =

Contemporary romance novel by Susan Elizabeth Phillips

- {First edition (publ. Avon Books)
- Author: Susan Elizabeth Phillips
- Genre: Contemporary romance
- Publisher: Avon Books
- Publication date: August 1, 1994

It Had to Be You is a contemporary romance novel by Susan Elizabeth Phillips. It is the first book in the Chicago Stars series

It was awarded the RITA award for "Best romance novel" of 1994.
