= Hester (novel) =

1883 novel by Margaret Oliphant

- Title page for Hester: A Story of Contemporary Life (1883)
- Author: Margaret Oliphant
- Publication date: 1883

Hester: A Story of Contemporary Life is an 1883 novel written by Margaret Oliphant. It examines the cycle of history through the lives of the Vernon family. The book was published in three separate volumes corresponding to three parts of the story. The novel was adapted (and the story reoriented) by Kate Clanchy and Zena Forster for broadcast by BBC Radio 4 in 2013, showing Hester as a determined organizer successful for years but ultimately defeated by the male world of Victorian business.

== Plot ==
=== Part 1 ===
The Vernon's Banking House is a thriving bank in England. After Mr. Rule, a clerk in the bank, hears rumours about a potential collapse of the bank, he seeks out bank owner John Vernon, but finds that Vernon has disappeared. Mr. Vernon's wife has no information about his disappearance or matters of the bank. However, Catherine, a part-owner of the bank, uses her fortune to stop a run on the bank.

Decades later, Mrs. Vernon and her 14-year-old daughter Hester move back to Redborough. When Hester meets Catherine, she forms an unfavourable impression, but she makes friends with Edward, who is Catherine's confidant and protégé.

Five years later, Hester befriends the elderly Morgans, suffers through family dinners, and rebuffs a marriage proposal from Harry, another of Catherine's protégés.

=== Part 2 ===
The Morgans' grandson Roland, briefly introduced in Part I, is developed as a love interest for Hester. The Morgans express their concern about his character in part due to his job as a speculator.

Ellen starts hosting tea dances, which allow the youths to mingle unsupervised and Hester to 'come out' in society. Mrs. John Vernon is excited to help her daughter Hester come out. Additionally, Mrs. Vernon's pearls, which she gives to Hester, provide a point of contention.

Roland's sister Emma then comes to stay with the Morgans. She tries to get herself invited to the dances so that she may also 'come out' and marry. Meanwhile, Edward makes his interest in Hester known and his discontent with Catherine grows.

Hester nearly finds out about her father at one of Catherine's parties.

=== Part 3 ===
Hester's love life is revisited and marriage is discussed, while Roland talks business with Edward and Harry. Harry is opposed to speculating with the bank's money, but Edward seems enthusiastic.

Edward's betrayal hurts Catherine, as well as harming the bank's business. Edward runs away and marries Emma.

Afterwards, Catherine and Hester work together to retain the bank's status and stability.

The name Hester is a Persian name. It means "Star".

== Characters ==
- Catherine Vernon: The matriarch of Redborough and the Vernon family. Catherine saved the Vernon family bank many years before with her fortune and willpower.
- Edward Vernon: A cousin of Catherine Vernon's and one of the partners in the bank. Catherine's favorite.
- Harry Vernon: Another cousin of Catherine's and the other partner in the bank. Viewed as dull by other characters, he is practical and business-minded.
- Ellen Vernon: Harry's sister. She lives in the White House with her brother and marries Algernon Merridew.
- Hester Vernon: The titular character of the novel and a cousin of Catherine. The daughter of the man who ruined the bank, she is one of Catherine's poorer relatives.
- Mrs. John Vernon: Hester's mother and the widow of John Vernon. She arrives at the Henronry impoverished.
- John Vernon: Catherine Vernon's cousin. He caused the run on the bank that led to Catherine Vernon's intervention.
- Mildmay Vernon: A gossipy, spiteful cousin of Catherine. He spends his days belittling Catherine and the Vernon-Ridgeway sisters.
- Miss Vernon-Ridgeways: Two spiteful cousins of Catherine's. They have a less negative view of Catherine than Mr. Mildmay, but they criticize her every move regardless. Typical Victorian-era spinsters.
- Mrs. Reginald Vernon: A widowed cousin of Catherine. She lives on the opposite side of Hester, who spends her days educating Mrs. Reginald's three children.
- Captain Morgan: Catherine's uncle, a retired and venerable sea captain. Grandfather to Roland and Emma Ashton.
- Mrs. Morgan: Aunt of Catherine, wife to Captain Morgan, and grandmother to Roland and Emma Ashton.
- Mr. Rule: Semi-retired clerk of the Vernon bank. One of the few characters not related to Catherine Vernon, he helps the Vernon cousins oversee the day-to-day operations of the bank.
- Roland Ashton: Grandson of the Morgans and a stockbroker. Love interest of Hester's.
- Emma Ashton: Granddaughter of the Morgans, with no occupation. She spends her time at the Henronry looking for an eligible bachelor and sets her eyes on Reginald Merridew.
- Algernon Merridew: A clerk at the Vernon bank. He eventually marries Ellen Vernon. Brother of Reginald Merridew.
- Reginald Merridew The younger brother of Algernon Merridew who works in his father's office. He hopes to marry Emma Ashton.
