= Phebe Starr =

Australian singer and songwriter

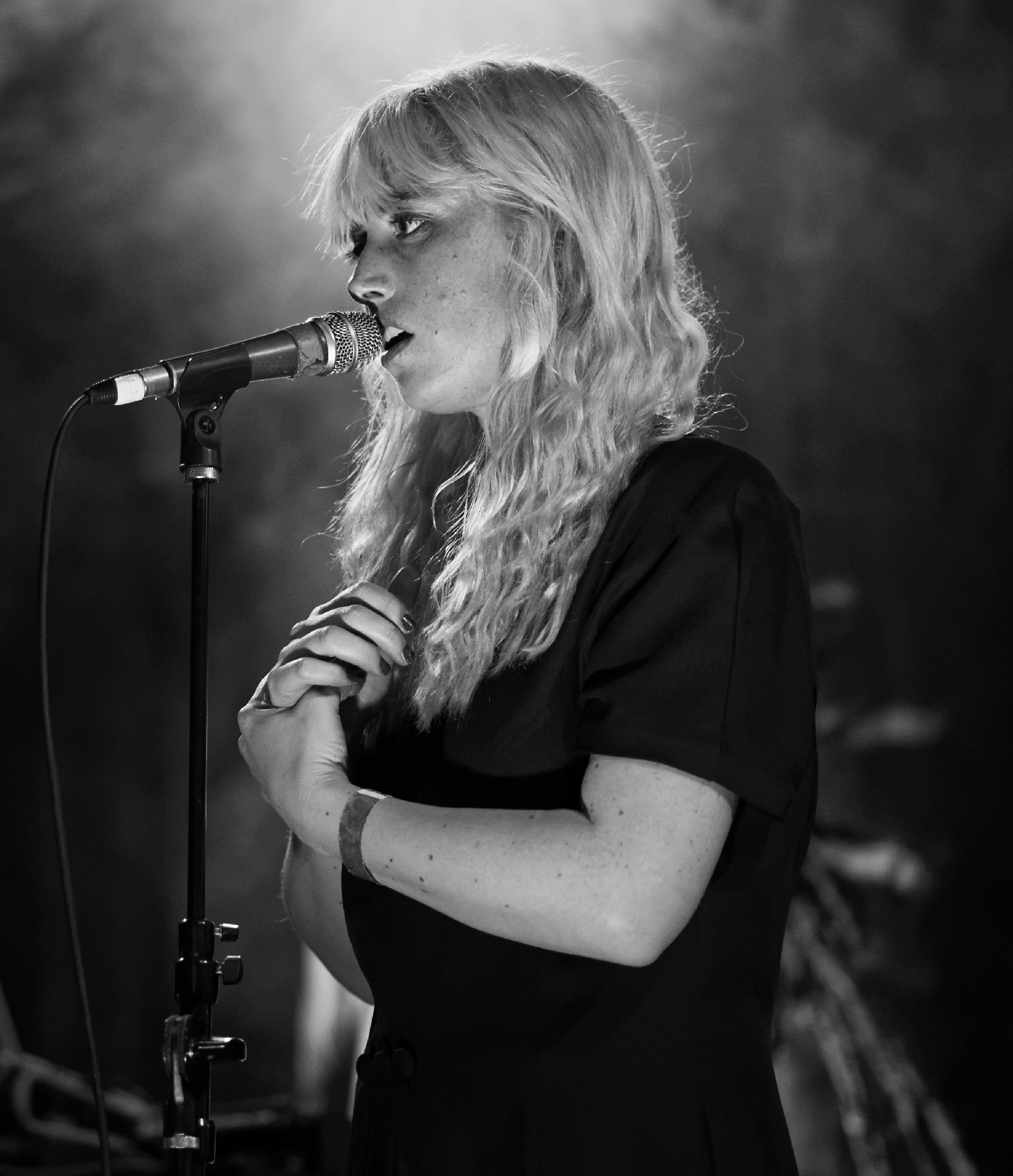
- Phebe Starr in 2016

Background information
- Origin: Australia
- Genres: Electronic, synthpop
- Years active: 2010–present
- Label: Independent

Phebe Starr is an Electropop singer/songwriter from Australia.

== Career ==
Starr began her career on Australian radio station Triple J. She released a debut single "Alone With You", which was favourably reviewed by ABC and The Age magazine, Her single has been placed in a Samsung commercial, the 2015 film A Million Happy Nows, and the television series Dance Academy and Offspring. Soon after, she released an EP, Zero.

Since then, Starr has received airplay from Triple J. She has also opened for Of Monsters and Men, Jagwar Ma, The Rubens, and Paperkites, in addition to touring both Australia and the US. Starr has been featured in Harper's Bazaar, Glamour, and Interview, and by Perez Hilton.

In 2016, Starr released a single, "Feel My Love", and performed in several venues in New York City. She appeared at The Foundry in Brisbane with Tigertown. She also performed at the SXSW Festival in Austin, Texas. In September, Starr's song "Feel My Love" won an award in the adult album alternative category by the International Unsigned Music Awards.

== Discography ==
=== Albums ===
- Heavy Metal Flower Petal (2022)

=== EPs ===
- Zero (2013)
- Phebe Starr on Audiotree Live (2016)
- Chronicles (2017)
- Ice Tea Liberace (2019)

=== Singles ===
- "Alone With You" (2012)
- "Jurassica" (2013)
- "Tonight" (2014)
- "Feel My Love" (2016)
- “WONDER” (2017)
- “TOUCH XXX” (2019)
- “DAFFODILS” (2020)
- “Alphabet Soup” (2020)
- “Ode to the Alien” (2020)
- “Rollercoaster Man” (2021)
- “Air” (2021)
- “Edelweiss” (2021)
- “Everything” (2022)

=== As featured artist ===
- "The Night" - Capetown single (2014)
