= Phoebe (beetle) =

Scientific classification
- Kingdom: Animalia
- Phylum: Arthropoda
- Class: Insecta
- Order: Coleoptera
- Suborder: Polyphaga
- Infraorder: Cucujiformia
- Family: Cerambycidae
- Subfamily: Lamiinae
- Tribe: Hemilophini
- Genus: Phoebe; Audinet-Serville, 1835

Species
- See text

Synonyms
- Leucophoebe Lane 1976

Genus of beetles

Phoebe is a genus of longhorn beetles of the subfamily Lamiinae, containing the following species:

- Phoebe alba Martins & Galileo, 2004
- Phoebe albaria (Bates, 1872)
- Phoebe bicornis (Olivier, 1795)
- Phoebe birai Galileo, 2015
- Phoebe blanci Audureau & Morvan, 2018
- Phoebe cava (Germar, 1824)
- Phoebe concinna White, 1856
- Phoebe cornuta (Olivier, 1795)
- Phoebe faurei Morvan & Audureau, 2019
- Phoebe fryana Lane, 1966
- Phoebe goiana Lane, 1966
- Phoebe kempfi (Lane, 1976)
- Phoebe luteola Bates, 1881
- Phoebe mafra Martins & Galileo, 1998
- Phoebe magisterbira Galileo, 2015
- Phoebe mexicana Bates, 1881
- Phoebe ornator (Tippmann, 1960)
- Phoebe parvimacula Martins & Galileo, 2011
- Phoebe phoebe (Lepeletier & Audinet-Serville, 1825)
- Phoebe pictilis Lane 1972
- Phoebe spegazzinii Bruch, 1908
- Phoebe subalbaria Belon, 1896
