= Meet Me at the Altar =

American pop punk band

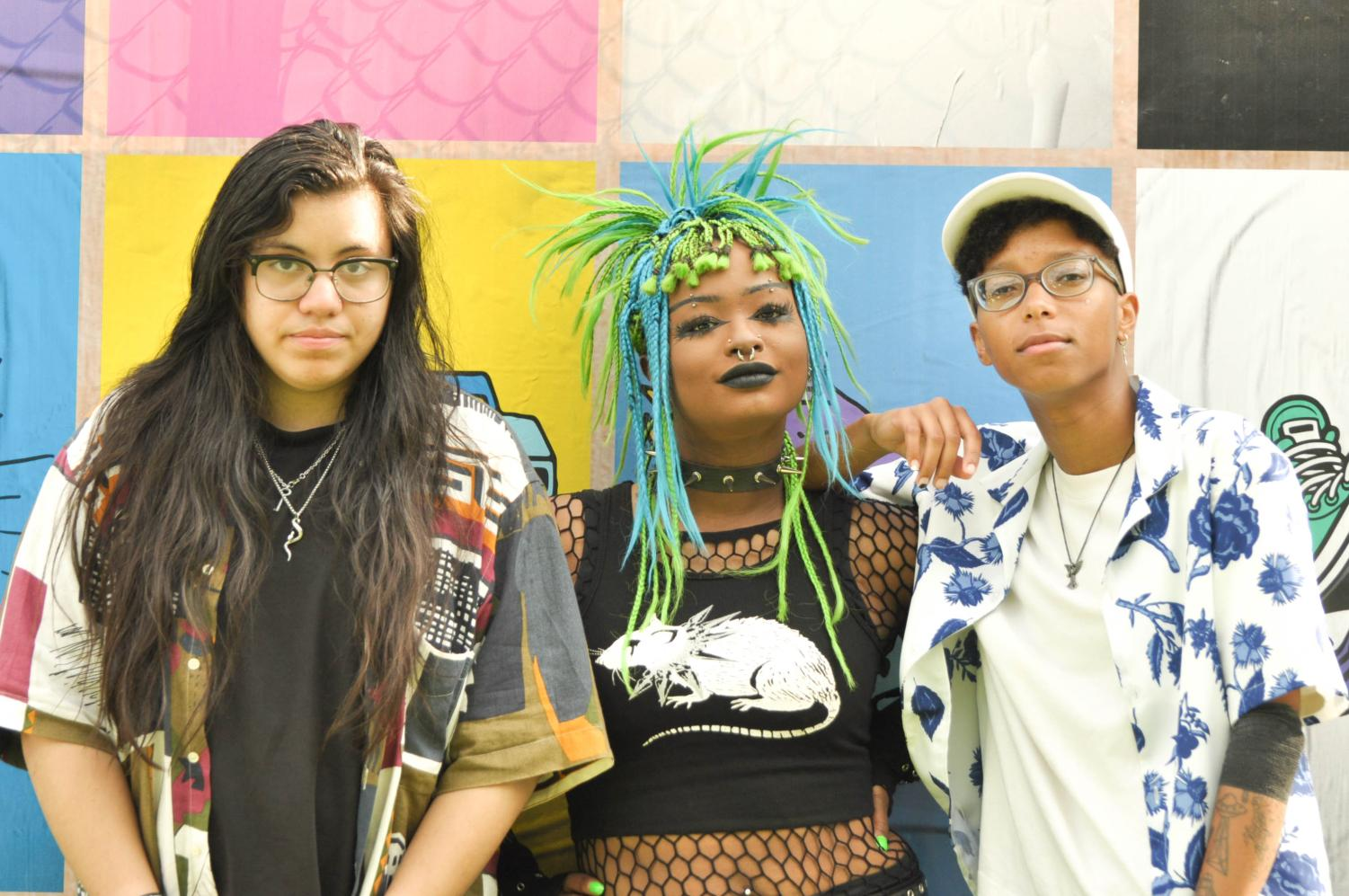
- Meet Me at the Altar in 2024. From left to right: Ada Juarez, Edith Victoria, and Téa Campbell

Background information
- Also known as: Meet Me @ the Altar
- Origin: Florida/Georgia/New Jersey, U.S.
- Genres: Pop-punk; easycore
- Years active: 2015–present
- Labels: Fueled by Ramen; LAB
- Members: Ada Juarez; Edith Victoria
- Past members: Téa Campbell
- Website: meetmeatthealtar.com

Meet Me at the Altar (stylized as Meet Me @ the Altar) is an American pop-punk band formed in 2015. Initially, the three members—all of whom lived in different states at the time—worked on music remotely through the internet. The band went on their first tour in 2018, and were signed by Fueled by Ramen in 2020.

== History ==
Meet Me at the Altar was formed in 2015, when Téa Campbell met Ada Juarez through YouTube; the latter had posted a number of videos covering pop-punk songs, and Campbell subsequently reached out. In time, the two developed a friendship that turned into the band. To locate a vocalist, Campbell and Juarez held auditions online. Edith Victoria was one of the individuals who tried out for the position, submitting a rendition of Paramore's "All I Wanted." The name of the band refers to a text conversation between Campbell and Juarez, as Billboard notes: "The [name] stems from a text message Juarez sent Campbell in a bonding moment: 'I was like "marry me!"' says Campbell, 'and she typed, "meet me @ the altar."'"

In 2020, the band went viral, partially in part of receiving public endorsements of pop-punk veterans Alex Gaskarth of All Time Low and Dan Campbell of The Wonder Years. In October 2020, the band was subsequently signed to Fueled by Ramen. After re-releasing "Garden" under Fueled By Ramen, they released their first new single under the label, "Hit Like a Girl", in March 2021. Their debut EP for the label, Model Citizen, released on August 13, 2021.

In 2022 the band performed at several large venues such as Lollapalooza and TwitchCon, as well as opening for Green Day. In January 2023, they made their television debut on The Late Show with Stephen Colbert, during which they announced their debut album, Past // Present // Future, which was released on March 10, and performed its lead single, "Say It (To My Face)." In September 2024, Meet Me at the Altar released their first live album, Live at the Forum, recorded at the KIA Forum in 2023 whilst the band were supporting 5 Seconds of Summer.

On April 4, 2025, Meet Me at the Altar announced that Campbell had left the band to "embark on a new chapter" and the band was no longer signed to Fueled By Ramen, having been dropped from the label the year prior following the departure of its staff amidst mergers with 300 Elektra Entertainment and Atlantic Music Group. The band signed with LAB Records in July, and released their fifth EP, Worried Sick, on December 5, 2025. The band embarked on a North American tour in support of the EP in January and February 2026 with Pollyanna.

== Musical style ==
The band's musical style is commonly described as pop-punk. Some publications have compared their musical style to another female-fronted pop-punk band, Paramore.

== Band members ==
Current

- Ada Juarez – drums (2015–present)
- Edith Victoria – vocals (2017–present)

Former

- Téa Campbell – guitar, bass (2015–2025)

Touring

- Rosalind Vo — bass (2015, 2018–2019)
- El Xiques – bass (2018–2022)
- Kaylie Sang – rhythm guitar (2019–2022)

== Discography ==
=== Studio albums ===
Title	Details
Out of Sight, Out of Mind	Released: 2017; Label: Self-released; Formats: CD, digital download
Past // Present // Future	Released: March 10, 2023; Label: Fueled by Ramen; Formats: CD, digital download

=== Extended plays ===
Title	Details
Red Walls	Released: December 31, 2015; Label: Self-publishing; Formats: digital download
Changing States	Released: April 28, 2018; Label: Self-released; Format: digital download
Bigger Than Me	Released: July 10, 2019; Label: Self-released; Formats: digital download
Model Citizen	Released: August 13, 2021; Label: Fueled by Ramen; Formats: CD, digital download
Worried Sick	Released: December 5, 2025; Label: LAB; Formats: Digital download

=== Singles ===
Year	Title	Album
2015	"Miscommunication"	Red Walls
2016	"Abhorrence"	Out of Sight, Out of Mind
2017	"I Made This Title Really Long Because Ada Told Me To"	Out of Sight, Out of Mind
2018	"Changing States"	Changing States
2020	"May the Odds Be in Your Favor"	Non-album single
2020	"Garden"	Non-album single
2021	"Hit Like a Girl"	Non-album single
2021	"Feel a Thing"	Model Citizen
2021	"Brighter Days (Are Before Us)"	Model Citizen
2022	"Say It (To My Face)"	Past // Present // Future
2023	"Kool"	Past // Present // Future
2025	"Straight Up (Needy)"	Worried Sick
2025	"Karma"	Worried Sick

=== Music videos ===
Year	Title
2019	"Morris Farm Drive"
2020	"Garden"
2021	"Feel a Thing"
2021	"Brighter Days (Are Before Us)"
2021	"Wake Up"
2021	"Now or Never"
2022	"Say It (To My Face)"
2023	"Kool"
2023	"T.M.I."
2023	"Strangers"
2023	"Changes"

=== As featured artist ===
Year	Artist	Title	Album
2024	MisterWives	"Dagger"	Nosebleeds: Encore
