= USS Phobos =

Crater-class cargo ship

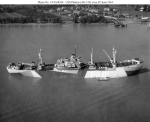
- USS Phobos (AK-129) at anchor in the Mississippi River near New Orleans, LA., circa 20 June 1944. A troop carrier, this ship was the only one of this class converted by the War Shipping Administration instead of the Navy. Note the platform on the bow for two 40 mm guns side by side, and the numerous minor differences in configuration compared to her sisters.

History

United States
- Name: Joseph H. Kibbey; Phobos
- Namesake: Joseph H. Kibbey; Phobos (moon)
- Ordered: as a type (EC2-S-C1) hull, MCE hull 1961, SS Joseph H. Kibbey
- Builder: Todd Houston Shipbuilding Co., Houston, Texas
- Laid down: 25 September 1943
- Launched: 6 November 1943
- Sponsored by: Mrs. J. S. Burrows
- Commissioned: 12 June 1944
- Decommissioned: 22 March 1946
- Refit: converted for Naval service at Todd-Johnson Dry Docks, Inc., New Orleans, LA.
- Stricken: 17 April 1946
- Identification: Hull symbol:AK-129
- Fate: Sold for scrapping, 20 February 1970

General characteristics
- Class & type: Crater-class cargo ship
- Displacement: 4,023 long tons (4,088 t) (standard); 14,550 long tons (14,780 t) (full load)
- Length: 441 ft 6 in (134.57 m)
- Beam: 56 ft 11 in (17.35 m)
- Draft: 28 ft 4 in (8.64 m)
- Installed power: 2 × Combustion Engineering header-type boilers, 220psi 450°; 2,500 shp (1,900 kW)
- Propulsion: 1 × Joshua Hendy vertical triple-expansion reciprocating steam engine; 1 × shaft
- Speed: 12.5 kn (23.2 km/h; 14.4 mph)
- Complement: 206
- Armament: 4 × 40 mm (1.6 in) 40mm Bofors anti-aircraft gun mounts; 12 × 20 mm (0.79 in) Oerlikon cannons anti-aircraft gun mounts

USS Phobos (AK-129) was a Crater-class cargo ship commissioned by the U.S. Navy for service in World War II. She was responsible for delivering troops, goods and equipment to locations in the war zone.

Phobos (AK–129) was laid down as SS Joseph H. Kibbey under Maritime Commission contract by Todd Houston Shipbuilding Co., Houston, Texas, 25 September 1943; launched 6 November 1943; sponsored by Mrs. J. S. Burrows; and delivered to the Maritime Commission 17 November 1943 for operation by the American Export Lines. Following one cruise as a merchant vessel, SS Joseph H. Kibbey was acquired by the Army Transportation Service for use as a troop transport. While under conversion at Todd-Johnson Dry Docks, Inc., New Orleans, Louisiana, she was reassigned to the Navy and named Phobos 15 January 1944. She was accepted by the Navy 12 June 1944 and commissioned the same day at Algiers, Louisiana.

== World War II Pacific Theatre operations ==
Phobos steamed to the U.S. East Coast late in June; and, after shakedown in Chesapeake Bay, she loaded dry stores for fleet issue and departed Norfolk, Virginia, 29 July.

=== Supplying ships for the invasion of Leyte ===
She transited the Panama Canal 6 August en route to the South Pacific Ocean. Arriving Manus, Admiralties, 15 September, she began duty with Service Squadron 10. Assigned to TG 30.9, Phobos supplied ships during final preparations for the impending invasion of the Philippines at Leyte. Thence, with U.S. Marine casualties of the Palaus embarked, she sailed to Nouméa, New Caledonia, between 29 October and 7 November.

After replenishing her holds, Phobos departed 18 November and during the rest of the month she provisioned ships of the U.S. 7th Fleet in the New Hebrides and New Guinea. On 5 December she returned to Manus where she continued issuing supplies to ships preparing for operations at Lingayen Gulf, Luzon. She completed her duty late in the month and sailed for the United States 29 December with 133 Leyte veterans embarked.

=== Supporting the 5th fleet ===
Phobos arrived San Francisco, California, 23 January 1945. After overhaul and loading cargo she deployed to the western Pacific 25 February, via Pearl Harbor and Eniwetok, reaching Ulithi, 24 March. During the next three months she served at this important American base and replenished ships of the U.S. 5th Fleet during the Okinawa campaign and strikes on the home islands of Japan. Between 20 June and 5 July, she sailed to Pearl Harbor where she was stocking her holds in preparation for the scheduled invasion of Japan when the Japanese ceased hostilities.

=== End-of-war activity ===
In mid-September Phobos steamed to the Marshalls where she provisioned ships before sailing to the Far East 15 October. She reached Okinawa the 23d and resumed supply operations. Between 4 and 7 November the cargo ship sailed to Japan for fleet issue duty under Service Division 102. During the next month she operated out of Tokyo Bay supplying provisions and medical stores.

== Post-war decommissioning ==
Phobos departed for the United States 15 December via Pearl Harbor, arriving San Francisco 7 January 1946. She decommissioned there 22 March 1946 and transferred the same day to the Maritime Commission for delivery to the U.S. Coast Guard. Her name was struck from the Naval Vessel Register 17 April 1946. Final Disposition: she was scrapped at Oakland, California, in 1970.

== Military awards and honors ==
No battle stars are indicated for Phobos in current Navy records. However, her crew was eligible for the following medals:

- American Campaign Medal
- Asiatic-Pacific Campaign Medal
- World War II Victory Medal
- Navy Occupation Service Medal (with Asia clasp)
