= Phoebe, Junior =

1876 novel by Margaret Oliphant

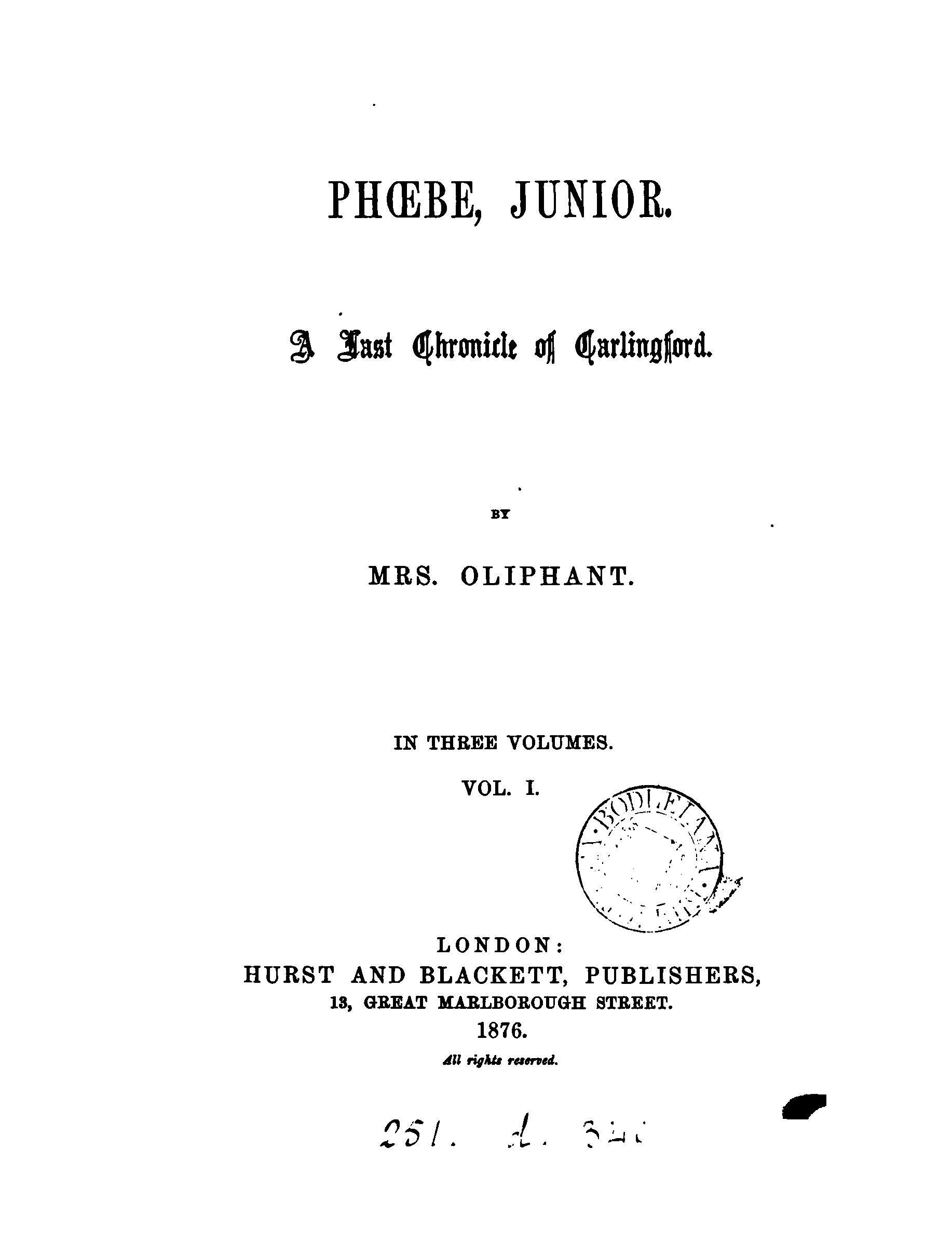
- First edition title page
- Author: Margaret Oliphant
- Series: Carlingford Chronicles
- Publisher: Hurst and Blackett
- Publication date: 1876
- Media type: Print, 3 Volumes

Phoebe, Junior. A Last Chronicle of Carlingford (also spelled Phœbe, Junior) is an 1876 novel by Margaret Oliphant. It follows the exploits of its heroine, Phoebe Beecham, as she learns the true history of her family history. This novel is the last of the six Carlingford Chronicles, and is set roughly in the early 1860s to late 1870s. The theme is social status and snobbery, when earlier conventions were challenged by changes in religion and politics in Victorian society. Phoebe Junior was dramatised by BBC Radio Four in 1993.

== Adaptations ==
BBC Radio 4 produced a four-part radio adaptation first broadcast on 8 May 1994, dramatized by Elizabeth Proud and featuring Elizabeth Spriggs as Margaret Oliphant and Charlotte Attenborough as Phoebe, Junior.
