= Margaret Oliphant =

Scottish novelist (1828–1897)

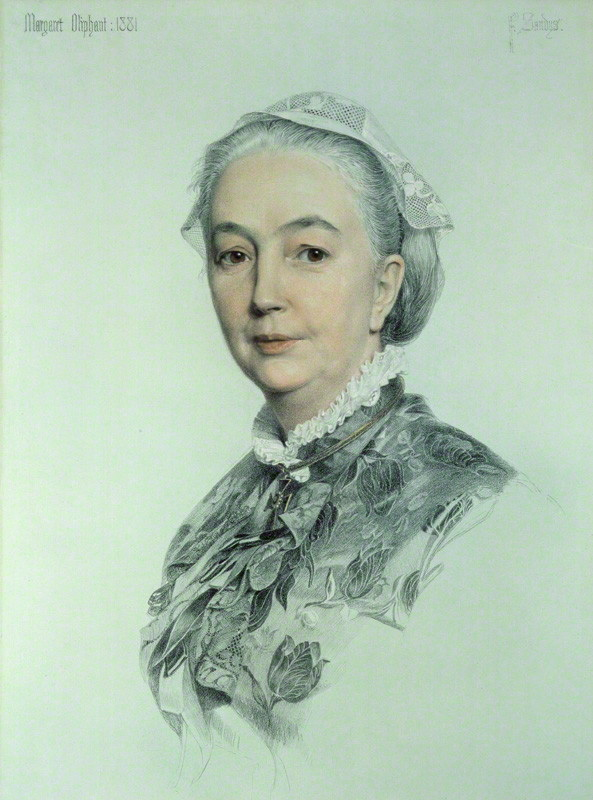
- 1881 portrait by Frederick Sandys
- Born: Margaret Oliphant Wilson; 4 April 1828; Wallyford, Scotland
- Died: 20 June 1897 (aged 69); Wimbledon, London, England
- Spouse: Francis Wilson Oliphant (m. 1852)
- Children: 3 who survived infancy
- Writing career
- Genre: Romance

Margaret Oliphant Wilson Oliphant (born Margaret Oliphant Wilson; 4 April 1828 – 20 June 1897) was a Scottish novelist and historical writer, who usually wrote as Mrs. Oliphant. Her fictional works cover "domestic realism, the historical novel and tales of the supernatural".

== Life ==
Margaret was born at Wallyford, near Musselburgh, East Lothian, as the only daughter and youngest surviving child of Margaret Oliphant (c. 1789 – 17 September 1854) and Francis W. Wilson (c. 1788–1858), a clerk. She spent her childhood at Lasswade, Glasgow and Liverpool. Oliphant Gardens, a street in Wallyford, is named after her. As a girl, she continually experimented with writing. She had her first novel published, Passages in the Life of Mrs. Margaret Maitland, in 1849. This dealt with the relatively successful Scottish Free Church movement, with which her parents sympathised. Next came Caleb Field in 1851, the year she met the publisher William Blackwood in Edinburgh and was invited to contribute to Blackwood's Magazine – a tie that continued for her lifetime and covered over 100 articles, including a critique of the character of Arthur Dimmesdale in Nathaniel Hawthorne's The Scarlet Letter.

In May 1852, Margaret married her cousin, Frank Wilson Oliphant, at Birkenhead and settled at Harrington Square, now in Camden, London. Her husband was an artist working mainly in stained glass. Three of their six children died in infancy. Her husband developed tuberculosis and for his health they moved in January 1859 to Florence and then to Rome, where he died. This left Oliphant in need of an income. She returned to England and took up literature to support her three surviving children.

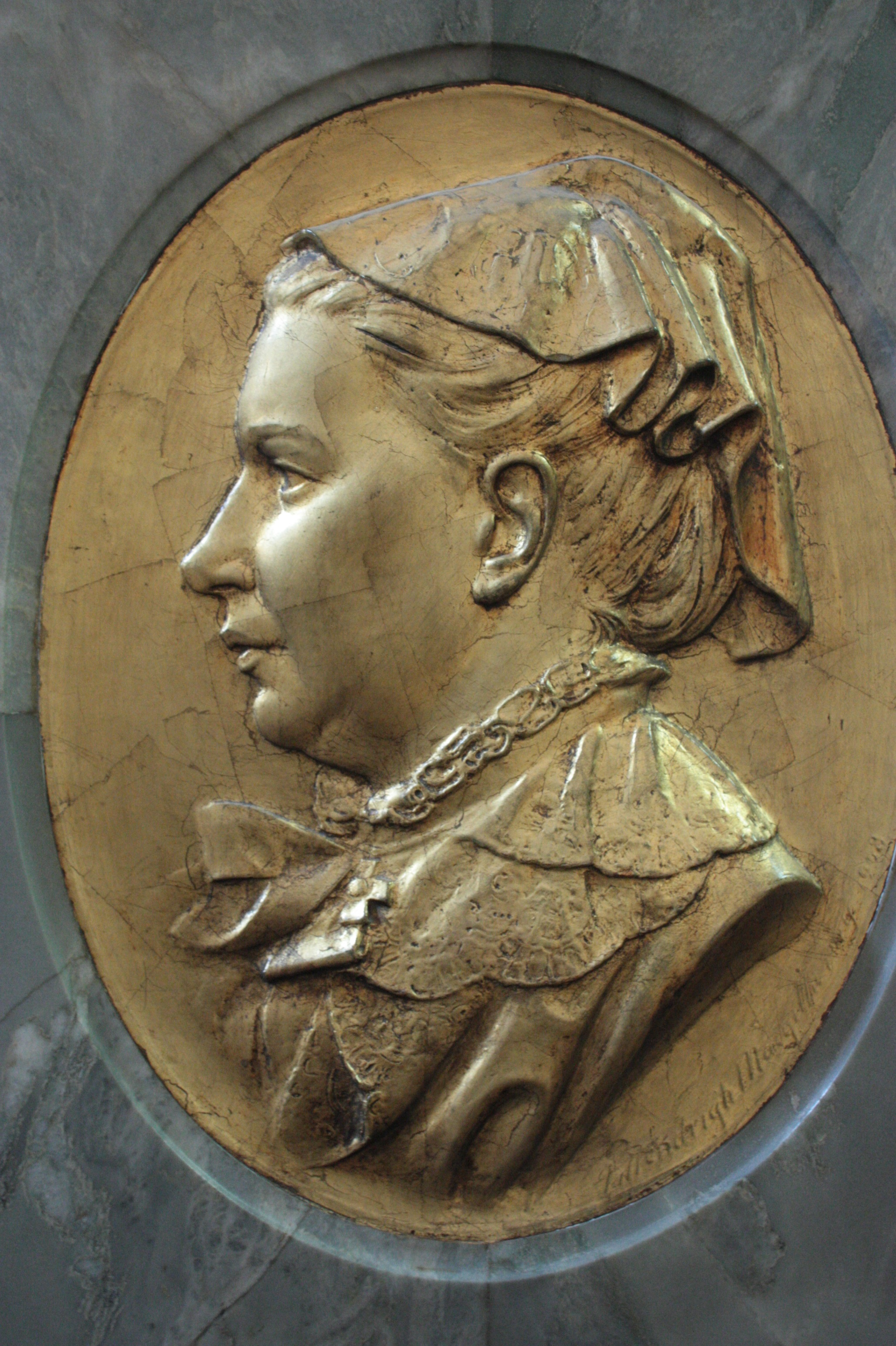
Memorial to Mrs Oliphant in St Giles' Cathedral, Edinburgh, unveiled by J. M. Barrie.

She had become a popular writer by then and worked notably hard to sustain her position. Unfortunately, her home life was full of sorrow and disappointment. In January 1864 her one remaining daughter Maggie died in Rome and was buried in her father's grave. Her brother, who had emigrated to Canada, was shortly afterwards involved in financial ruin. Oliphant offered a home to him and his children, adding their support to already heavy responsibilities.

In 1866 she settled at Windsor to be near her sons, who were attending Eton. That year, her second cousin, Annie Louisa Walker, came to live with her as a companion-housekeeper. Windsor was her home for the rest of her life. Over more than 30 years she pursued a varied literary career, but personal troubles continued. Her ambitions for her sons remained unfulfilled. Cyril Francis, the elder, died in 1890, leaving a Life of Alfred de Musset, incorporated in his mother's Foreign Classics for English Readers. The younger, Francis (whom she called "Cecco"), collaborated with her in the Victorian Age of English Literature and won a position at the British Museum, but was rejected by Sir Andrew Clark, a famous physician. He died in 1894. With the last of her children lost to her, she had little further interest in life. Her health steadily declined and she died at Wimbledon on 20 June 1897. She was buried in Eton beside her sons. She left a personal estate worth a gross £4,932 and a net value £804.

In the 1880s Oliphant acted as literary mentor of the Irish novelist Emily Lawless. During that time, Oliphant wrote several works of supernatural fiction, including a long ghost story A Beleaguered City (1880) and several short tales, including "The Open Door" and "Old Lady Mary". Oliphant also wrote historical fiction. Magdalen Hepburn (1854) is set during the Scottish Reformation, and features Mary, Queen of Scots and John Knox as characters.

== Gallery ==
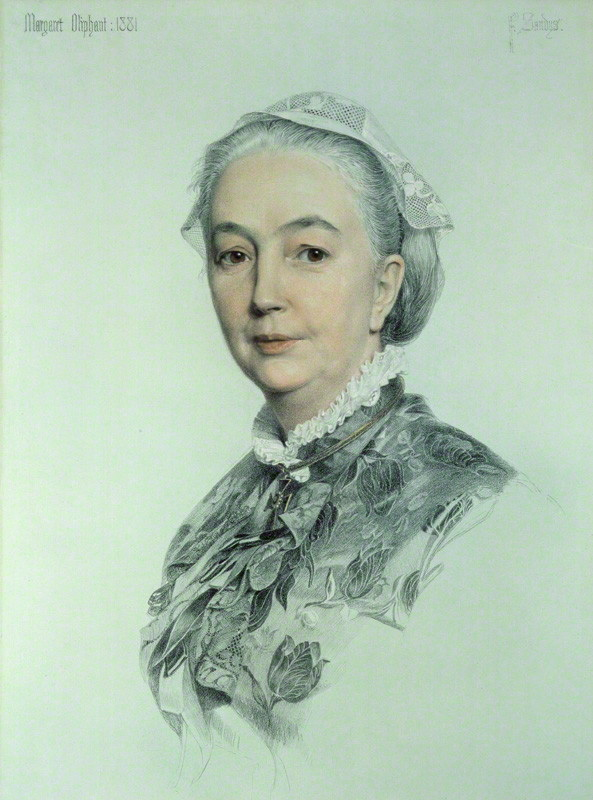
Portrait of Oliphant, by Frederick Augustus Sandys, chalk, 1881.

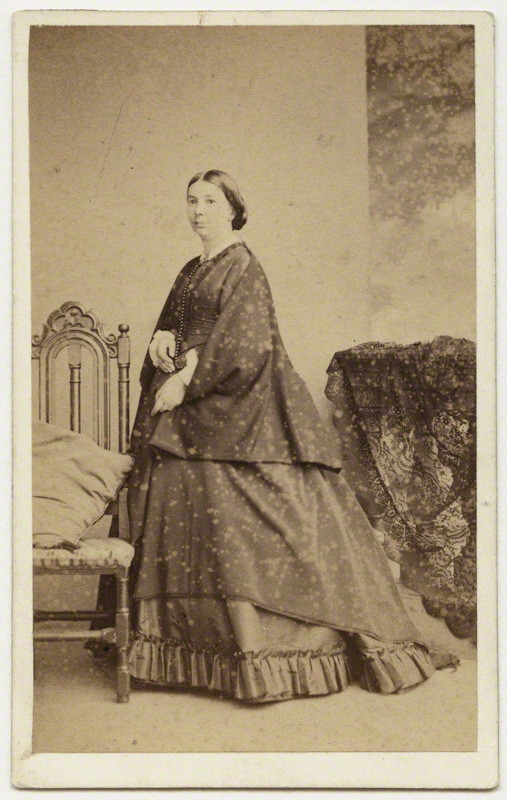
Albumen carte-de-visite, by Thomas Rodger, ca. 1860s.

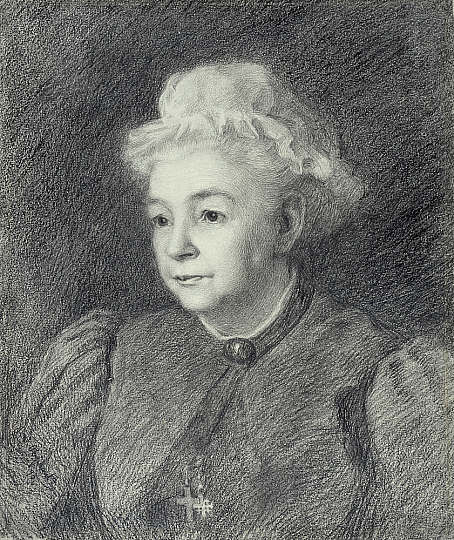
Margaret Oliphant, by Janet Mary Oliphant, 1895.

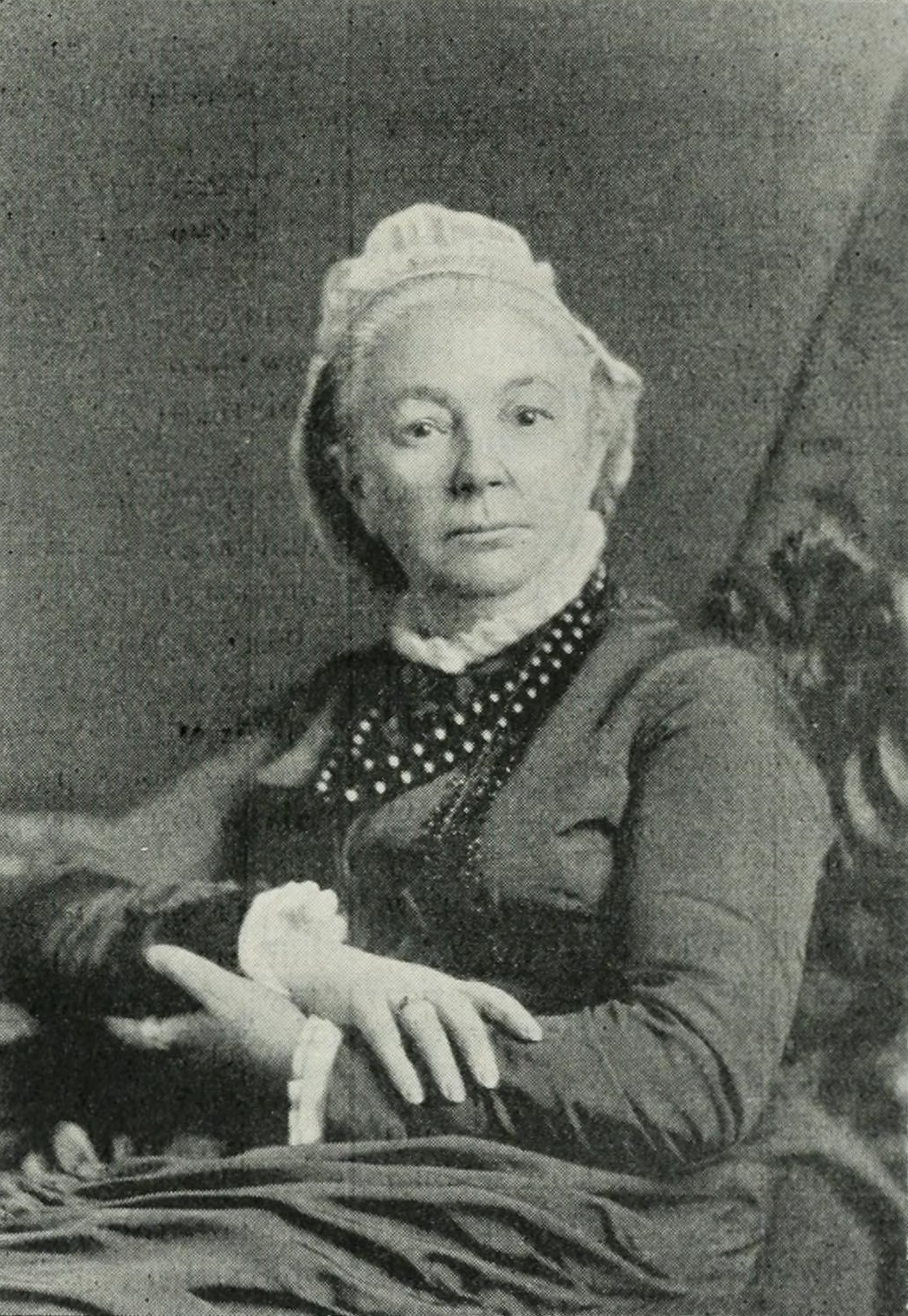
Margaret Oliphant, by Hills & Saunders.

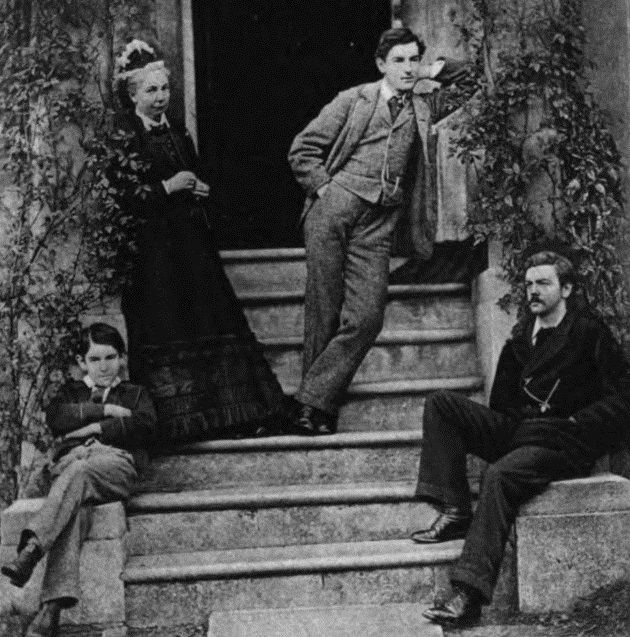
Margaret Oliphant and her family in Windsor, 1874.

== Works ==
Oliphant wrote more than 120 works, including novels, books of travel and description, histories, and volumes of literary criticism.

=== Novels ===
- Margaret Maitland (1849)
- Merkland (1850)
- Caleb Field (1851)
- John Drayton (1851)
- Adam Graeme (1852)
- The Melvilles (1852)
- Katie Stewart (1852)
- Harry Muir (1853)
- Ailieford (1853)
- The Quiet Heart (1854)
- Magdalen Hepburn (1854)
- Zaidee (1855)
- Lilliesleaf (1855)
- Christian Melville (1855)
- The Athelings (1857)
- The Days of My Life (1857)
- Orphans (1858)
- The Laird of Norlaw (1858)
- Agnes Hopetoun's Schools and Holidays (1859)
- Lucy Crofton (1860)
- The House on the Moor (1861)
- The Last of the Mortimers (1862)
- Heart and Cross (1863)
- The Chronicles of Carlingford in Blackwood's Magazine (1862–65), republished as:
  - "The Executor," a short story (1861)
  - The Rector (1861)
  - The Doctor's Family (1861)
  - Salem Chapel (1863)
  - The Perpetual Curate (1864)
  - Miss Marjoribanks (1865–66)
  - Phoebe Junior (1876)
- A Son of the Soil (1865)
- Agnes (1866)
- Madonna Mary (1867)
- Brownlows (1868)
- The Minister's Wife (1869)
- The Three Brothers (1870)
- John: A Love Story (1870)
- Squire Arden (1871)
- At his Gates (1872)
- Ombra (1872)
- May (1873)
- Innocent (1873)
- The Story of Valentine and his Brother (1875)
- A Rose in June (1874)
- For Love and Life (1874)
- Whiteladies (1875)
- An Odd Couple (1875)
- The Curate in Charge (1876)
- Carità (1877)
- Young Musgrave (1877)
- Mrs. Arthur (1877)
- The Primrose Path (1878)
- Within the Precincts (1879)
- The Fugitives (1879)
- A Beleaguered City (1879)
- The Greatest Heiress in England (1880)
- He That Will Not When He May (1880)
- In Trust (1881)
- Harry Joscelyn (1881)
- Lady Jane (1882)
- A Little Pilgrim in the Unseen (1882)
- The Ladies Lindores (1883)
- Sir Tom (1883)
- Hester (1883)
- It Was a Lover and his Lass (1883)
- The Lady's Walk (1883)
- The Wizard's Son (1884)
- Madam (1884)
- The Prodigals and their Inheritance (1885)
- Oliver's Bride (1885)
- A Country Gentleman and his Family (1886)
- A House Divided Against Itself (1886)
- Effie Ogilvie (1886)
- A Poor Gentleman (1886)
- The Son of his Father (1886)
- Joyce (1888)
- Cousin Mary (1888)
- The Land of Darkness (1888)
- Lady Car (1889)
- Kirsteen (1890)
- The Mystery of Mrs. Blencarrow (1890)
- Sons and Daughters (1890)
- The Railway Man and his Children (1891)
- The Heir Presumptive and the Heir Apparent (1891)
- The Marriage of Elinor (1891)
- Janet (1891)
- The Story of a Governess (1891)
- The Cuckoo in the Nest (1892)
- Diana Trelawny (1892)
- The Sorceress (1893)
- A House in Bloomsbury (1894)
- Sir Robert's Fortune (1894)
- Who Was Lost and is Found (1894)
- Lady William (1894)
- Two Strangers (1895)
- Old Mr. Tredgold (1895)
- The Unjust Steward (1896)
- The Ways of Life (1897)

=== Short stories ===
- Neighbours on the Green (1889)
- The Library Window (1896)
- A Widow's Tale and Other Stories (1898)
- That Little Cutty (1898)
- "The Open Door." In: Great Ghost Stories (1918)

=== Selected articles ===
- "Mary Russel Mitford," Blackwood's Magazine, Vol. 75, 1854
- "Evelin and Pepys," Blackwood's Magazine, Vol. 76, 1854
- "The Holy Land," Blackwood's Magazine, Vol. 76, 1854
- "Mr. Thackeray and his Novels," Blackwood's Magazine, Vol. 77, 1855
- "Bulwer," Blackwood's Magazine, Vol. 77, 1855
- "Charles Dickens," Blackwood's Magazine, Vol. 77, 1855
- "Modern Novelists—Great and Small," Blackwood's Magazine, Vol. 77, 1855
- "Modern Light Literature: Poetry," Blackwood's Magazine, Vol. 79, 1856
- "Religion in Common Life," Blackwood's Magazine, Vol. 79, 1856
- "Sydney Smith," Blackwood's Magazine, Vol. 79, 1856
- "The Laws Concerning Women," Blackwood's Magazine, Vol. 79, 1856
- "The Art of Caviling," Backwood's Magazine, Vol. 80, 1856
- "Béranger," Blackwood's Magazine, Vol. 83, 1858
- "The Condition of Women," Blackwood's Magazine, Vol. 83, 1858
- "The Missionary Explorer," Blackwood's Magazine, Vol. 83, 1858
- "Religious Memoirs," Blackwood's Magazine, Vol. 83, 1858
- "Social Science," Blackwood's Magazine, Vol. 88, 1860
- "Scotland and her Accusers," Blackwood's Magazine, Vol. 90, 1861
- "Girolamo Savonarola," Blackwood's Magazine, Vol. 93, 1863
- "The Life of Jesus," Blackwood's Magazine, Vol. 96, 1864
- "Giacomo Leopardi," Blackwood's Magazine, Vol. 98, 1865
- "The Great Unrepresented," Blackwood's Magazine, Vol. 100, 1866
- "Mill on the Subjection of Women," The Edinburgh Review, Vol. 130, 1869
- "The Opium-Eater," Blackwood's Magazine, Vol. 122, 1877
- "Russian and Nihilism in the Novels of I. Tourgeniéf," Blackwood's Magazine, Vol. 127, 1880
- "School and College," Blackwood's Magazine, Vol. 128, 1880
- "The Grievances of Women," Fraser's Magazine, New Series, Vol. 21, 1880
- "Mrs. Carlyle," The Contemporary Review, Vol. 43, May 1883
- "The Ethics of Biography," The Contemporary Review, July 1883
- "Victor Hugo," The Contemporary Review, Vol. 48, July/December 1885
- "A Venetian Dynasty," The Contemporary Review, Vol. 50, August 1886
- "Laurence Oliphant," Blackwood's Magazine, Vol. 145, 1889
- "Tennyson," Blackwood's Magazine, Vol. 152, 1892
- "Addison, the Humorist," Century Magazine, Vol. 48, 1894
- "The Anti-Marriage League," Blackwood's Magazine, Vol. 159, 1896

=== Biographies ===
Oliphant's biographies of Edward Irving (1862) and her cousin Laurence Oliphant (1892), together with her life of Sheridan in the English Men of Letters series (1883), show vivacity and a sympathetic touch. She also wrote lives of Francis of Assisi (1871), the French historian Count de Montalembert (1872), Dante (1877), Miguel de Cervantes (1880), and the Scottish theologian John Tulloch (1888).

=== Historical and critical works ===
- Historical Sketches of the Reign of George II (1869) (See George II.)
- The Makers of Florence (1876)
- A Literary History of England from 1760 to 1825 (1882)
- The Makers of Venice (1887)
- Royal Edinburgh (1890)
- Jerusalem, the Holy City, Its History and Hope (1891)
- The Makers of Modern Rome (1895)
- William Blackwood and his Sons (1897)
- "The Sisters Brontë." In: Women Novelists of Queen Victoria's Reign (1897)

At the time of her death, Oliphant was still working on Annals of a Publishing House, a record of the progress and achievement of the firm of Blackwood, with which she had been so long connected. Her Autobiography and Letters, which present a touching picture of her domestic anxieties, appeared in 1899. Only parts were written with a wider audience in mind: she had originally intended the Autobiography for her son, but he died before she had finished it.

=== Critical reception ===
Opinions on Oliphant's work are split, with some critics seeing her as a "domestic novelist", while others recognise her work as influential and important to the Victorian literature canon. Critical reception from Oliphant's contemporaries is divided as well. Among those who were not in favour of Oliphant was John Skelton, who took the view that Oliphant wrote too much and too fast. Writing a Blackwood's article called "A Little Chat About Mrs. Oliphant", he asked, "Had Mrs. Oliphant concentrated her powers, what might she not have done? We might have had another Charlotte Brontë or another George Eliot." Not all of the contemporary reception was negative, though. M. R. James admired Oliphant's supernatural fiction, concluding that "the religious ghost story, as it may be called, was never done better than by Mrs. Oliphant in "The Open Door" and A Beleaguered City". Mary Butts lauded Oliphant's ghost story "The Library Window", describing it as "one masterpiece of sober loveliness". Principal John Tulloch praised her "large powers, spiritual insight, and purity of thought, and subtle discrimination of many of the best aspects of our social life and character".

More modern critics of Oliphant's work include Virginia Woolf, who asked in Three Guineas whether Oliphant's autobiography does not lead the reader "to deplore the fact that Mrs. Oliphant sold her brain, her very admirable brain, prostituted her culture and enslaved her intellectual liberty in order that she might earn her living and educate her children." However, even modern critics are divided on Oliphant's work. Authors Gilbert and Gubar did not include Oliphant in their "Great tradition" of women's writing because she did not question or challenge the patriarchy at the time of her life and writing.

=== Revival of interest ===
Interest in Mrs Oliphant's work declined in the 20th century. In the mid-1980s, a small-scale revival was led by the publishers Alan Sutton and Virago Press, centred on the Carlingford series and some similarities of subject-matter with the work of Anthony Trollope.

Penguin Books in 1999 published an edition of Miss Marjoribanks (1866). Hester (1873) was reissued in 2003 by Oxford World's Classics. In 2007–2009, the Gloucester publisher Dodo Press reprinted half a dozen of Oliphant's works. In 2010, both the British Library and Persephone Books reissued The Mystery of Mrs. Blencarrow (1890), in the latter case with the novella Queen Eleanor and Fair Rosamund (1886), and the Association for Scottish Literary Studies produced a new edition of the novel Kirsteen (1890).

BBC Radio 4 broadcast four-hour dramatisations of Miss Marjoribanks in August/September 1992 and Phoebe Junior in May 1995. A 70-minute adaptation of Hester was broadcast on Radio 4 in January 2014.

Russell Hoban alludes to Oliphant's fiction in his 2003 novel Her Name Was Lola.
