= Project Phobos =

- Developer(s): Oracle Corporation
- Final release: 0.6.3
- Operating system: Cross-platform
- Available in: Java 6 or Higher
- Type: Server-side Scripting Framework
- License: CDDL version 1.0 and GPL v2 license
- Website: web.archive.org/web/20170103170958/https://phobos.java.net/

Project Phobos is a lightweight, scripting-friendly, web application environment running on the Java platform.

These include a fully featured debugger; wizards to help you get started faster; a palette of JmakiAjax widgets that can be dropped on a page and the ability to generate a standard web application for deployment on any servlet container or Java EE application server.

Currently, the primary language supported by Phobos is JavaScript. By leveraging JavaScript on the server, Phobos allows developers to use the same language on the client and server tier of a web application, eliminating the impedance mismatch that characterizes other approaches to Ajax.

This project was archived and effectively discontinued.
