= Hit Like a Girl =

Single by Meet Me at the Altar
- Released: March 22, 2021
- Genre: Pop punk
- Length: 3:59
- Label: Fueled by Ramen

Meet Me at the Altar singles chronology
"Garden" (2020)	"Hit Like a Girl" (2021)	"Feel a Thing" (2021)

"Hit Like a Girl" is a song by American pop punk band Meet Me at the Altar. It was a non-album single released in March 2021.

== Background ==
The song was released on March 22, 2021, as the band's second official single release since signing to record label Fueled by Ramen, after the re-release of their first single, "Garden". The band partnered with Facebook for the track's release in celebration of Women's History Month. A lyric video and a "behind-the-scenes" making of the song video were released alongside the track as well. The track, upon release, was a non-album single, with no mention on whether or not it would appear on future EPs or albums by the band.

== Themes and composition ==
The song's lyrics center around a theme of female empowerment. Specifically, the song was written after bandmembers collaborated with the Facebook group "Women X Women" in a campaign of requesting fans submit uplifting stories related to being a woman; the resulting stories inspired the lyrics of the song. The song was written to inspire women that they can "do anything they set their mind to".

Musically, the song was commonly described by music publications as pop punk. The song was described as having a high energy vocals and sound with large, melodic pop punk choruses and breakdown instrumental interludes. The song was described as a more guitar riff-heavy version of the music released by bands like All Time Low and Tonight Alive.

== Reception ==
The song was generally well received. Loudwire described the song as "the perfect pop punk anthem to celebrate Women's History Month". They later named it one of their top songs of 2021. Rock Sound praised the band for having created "an anthem of the highest order and one that feels as powerful in its messages as its musicianship" with the song.

== Personnel ==
- Edith Johnson - vocals
- Tea Campbell - guitars, bass
- Ada Juarez - drums
