= Blonde Redhead (album) =

Studio album by Blonde Redhead
- Released: 1994
- Recorded: March 1994
- Studio: Random Falls (New York, New York)
- Genre: Indie rock; art rock
- Length: 29:07
- Label: Smells Like
- Producer: Steve Shelley

Blonde Redhead chronology
Blonde Redhead (1994)	La Mia Vita Violenta (1995)

Blonde Redhead is the debut studio album by American alternative rock band Blonde Redhead. It was released in 1994 by Smells Like Records.

== Critical reception ==
Professional ratings
Review scores
Source	Rating
AllMusic	3.5/5 stars

Trouser Press wrote: "SY drummer Steve Shelley produced and released the album on his own label, and his group's guitar sound and song structures clearly inform Blonde Redhead‘s eight songs, which include both warped pop nuggets ('Sciuri Sciura') and trippy guitar forays ('I Don’t Want U')."

== Track listing ==
All tracks are written by Kazu Makino, Amedeo Pace and Simone Pace.

No.	Title	Length
1.	"I Don't Want U"	5:03
2.	"Sciuri Sciura"	3:22
3.	"Astro Boy"	4:19
4.	"Without Feathers"	3:57
5.	"Snippet"	3:02
6.	"Mama Cita"	3:21
7.	"Swing Pool"	4:15
8.	"Girl Boy"	1:48
Total length:		29:07

Japanese edition bonus tracks
No.	Title	Length
9.	"Vague"	4:05
10.	"Flying Douglas"	5:14
Total length:		38:26

== Personnel ==
Credits are adapted from the album's liner notes.

Blonde Redhead

- Kazu Makino – guitar, vocals except on "Snippet"
- Amedeo Pace – guitar, vocals except on "Without Feathers," "Snippet" and "Girl Boy"
- Simone Pace – drums
- Maki Takahashi – bass except on "Girl Boy"

Additional personnel

- Ari Marcopoulos – photography
- Steve Shelley – production
- John Siket – mixing
- Skúli Sverrisson – bass on "Girl Boy"
- Mark Venezia – recording
