= Jesse Hartman =

American musician, film maker and actor

Jesse Hartman is an American musician, film maker and actor, living in New York's East Village.

== Career ==
=== Music ===
Hartman formed the band Sammy with Luke Wood (where Hartman co-wrote, sang, and played guitar and keyboards), releasing Debut Album (1994), Kings of the Inland Empire (1995) and Tales of Great Neck Glory (1996). Sammy came out of an earlier group called Worrying Thing where Wood sang most of the vocals and Hartman played lead guitar. Hartman sang on one song called "In Filth," which was later rerecorded as Sammy's first single, "Evergladed." Initially signed to Steve Shelley of Sonic Youth's label Smells Like Records and Fire Records , Hartman and Wood would subsequently sign to major label Geffen Records before disbanding soon after the release of their third and final album, Tales of Great Neck Glory.

Hartman went on to form the rock/electro group Laptop in 1997, releasing an EP, End Credits, in 1997, followed by the single "Gimme The Nite" in 1998. "End Credits" garnered airplay on BBC Radio 1's Evening Session. daytime on Xfm rotation and was debuted by John Peel on BBC Radio 1. The song used samples of Hartman's ex-girlfriend's answering machine. The Laptop single Nothing to Declare spent one week at #74 in the UK Singles Chart in June 1999.

Hartman signed a recording contract by Island Records and released two singles ("Nothing to Declare" and "I'm So Happy You Failed", both in 1999), before leaving the label. He eventually joined Norweigen label Trust Me Records and released the albums Opening Credits (2000), The Old Me vs. The New You (2001), before moving to outsider specialist label, known for artists such as Daniel Johnston and The Mooney Suzuki, Gammon Records to release third album, Don't Try This At Home (2003). In 2025 Laptops debut single 'End Credits' was released by synthpop supergroup Doublespeak (consisting of Vince Clarke of Erasure, Neil Arthur of Blancmange and Benge), inspiring a relaunch of the project and reissue of the song, accompanied by extended versions plus remixes by The High Llamas and Xploding Plastix. Subsequent interest led to a four page feature in Electronic Sound magazine and Still Listening magazine who awarded him the title of 'the inventor of bedroom pop' .

Hartman went on to sell out his first show in 23 years at The Betsey Trotwood in June 2026, and releases new EP on October 23rd, a remastered version of Nothing To Declare, accompanied by the much sought after Les Rhythmes Digitales remix of the title track, plus three new tracks produced by Mark Saunders who Hartman had previously worked with during his tenure at Island Records. Saunders is also known for his work with The Cure, Tricky, Depeche Mode, Neneh Cherry and Erasure. Following this there will be a live date at Servant jazz quarters in Dalston, UK on October 23rd.

=== Film ===
As a filmmaker, Hartman has written and directed Happy Hour (1993, Best Short Film Award Berlin Intl. Film Festival) and House of Satisfaction (2008), made documentaries for MSNBC's Edgewise (1997, opening night selection of Rotterdam Intl. Film Festival), and produced Kelly Reichardt's debut indie feature film River of Grass, which premiered at the 1994 Sundance Film Festival.

As an actor, Hartman has been in Larry Fessenden's vampire film Habit and House of Satisfaction (2008), which he also wrote and directed.
