= Red Dragon Tattoo =

Single by Fountains of Wayne

from the album Utopia Parkway
- Released: May 1999
- Studio: Stratosphere Sound (New York City)
- Genre: Power pop
- Length: 3:32
- Label: Atlantic
- Songwriters: Chris Collingwood; Adam Schlesinger
- Producers: Collingwood; Schlesinger

Fountains of Wayne singles chronology
| "Denise" (1999) | "Red Dragon Tattoo" (1999) | "Troubled Times" (1999) |

"Red Dragon Tattoo" is a song by American rock band Fountains of Wayne. It was released in May 1999, as the second single from their second studio album, Utopia Parkway. It reached number 79 on the UK Singles Chart, as well as number 61 on the Australian Singles Chart.

== Composition and lyrics ==
"Red Dragon Tattoo" was written and produced by Chris Collingwood and Adam Schlesinger, the track was recorded at Stratosphere Sound in New York City. Lyrically, the song tells a story about a guy who went to Coney Island to get a tattoo to impress the girl he wants. The band also references Korn in the song, with the line going: "Will you stop pretending I've never been born now I look a little more like that guy from Korn?." According to Schlesinger, their reasoning for this is because "a lot of times you mention another band in a song because it is just that -- it's so out of place that it kind of makes you laugh."

== Critical reception ==
Following the death of Schlesinger, The New York Times released their "Adam Schlesinger's 30 Essential Songs" list, featuring "Red Dragon Tattoo". Writer Rob Tannenbaum called it "The band's first absolute power-pop masterpiece." Similarly, Rolling Stone also listed the song on their "20 Essential Songs" from Schlesinger, writing, "the band may not have recorded a more propulsive track than this Utopia Parkway highlight about a dude who takes the N train out to Coney Island in a desperate attempt to impress a girl who doesn't know he exists." On Goldmine's "10 Great Fountains of Wayne Songs" list, author John M. Borack stated, "A fine example of Schlesinger/Collingwood songcraft, the upbeat 'RDT' has a sublime melody, hilariously cheeky lyrics and a glorious synth solo." On NME's "Adam Schlesinger's 10 best songs" list, writer Mark Grassick wrote on the song, "Another Schlesinger/Collingwood trademark [...] is steeped in this sensibility." Chris Willman of Variety said the track is "probably Fountains of Wayne's funniest song ever."

== Live performances ==
A live version of the song was featured on the band's live album No Better Place: Live in Chicago. On May 24, 2025, the band performed the song at the Mizner Park Amphitheater in Boca Raton, Florida, their first show in 12 years, opening for Weezer.

== Track listing ==
US promo CD
| No. | Title | Length |
|---|---|---|
| 1. | "Red Dragon Tattoo" | 3:32 |

CD single
| No. | Title | Length |
|---|---|---|
| 1. | "Red Dragon Tattoo" | 3:32 |
| 2. | "Today's Teardrops" | 2:07 |
| 3. | "Nightlight" | 3:03 |

7" Vinyl
| No. | Title | Length |
|---|---|---|
| 1. | "Red Dragon Tattoo" | 3:32 |
| 2. | "Today's Teardrops" | 2:07 |

== Personnel ==
Credits for "Red Dragon Tattoo" retrieved from album's liner notes.

Fountains of Wayne

- Chris Collingwood – lead vocals, rhythm guitar
- Jody Porter – lead guitar, backing vocals
- Adam Schlesinger – bass, synthesizers, backing vocals
- Brian Young – drums, percussion

Additional musicians

- Kevin Woolsey – handclaps

Production

- Adam Schlesinger – producer
- Chris Collingwood – producer
- John Siket – engineer
- Gary Maurer – engineer
- Mike Denneen – mixing

== Charts ==
Chart performance for "Red Dragon Tattoo"
| Chart (1999) | Peak position |
|---|---|
| Australia (ARIA) | 61 |
| Scotland Singles (OCC) | 83 |
| UK Singles (OCC) | 79 |

== Release history ==
Release dates and formats for "Red Dragon Tattoo"
| Region | Date | Format | Label | Ref. |
|---|---|---|---|---|
| Europe | May 1999 | CD | Atlantic | |
| Australia | July 26, 1999 | CD | Atlantic | |
