= Publisher (disambiguation) =

A publisher is an organization or human person distributing information or entertainment to the public.

Publisher may also refer to:

- The chief executive officer of a periodical
- Microsoft Publisher, desktop publishing (DTP) software
- "Publisher", a 2007 song on 23 (Blonde Redhead album)
- Preachers within the organizational structure of Jehovah's Witnesses

== See also ==
- Media proprietor
- Publishing rights, a legal concept in music publishing
- Self-publisher
