= Earthstar Mountain =

Studio album by Hannah Cohen
- Released: March 28, 2025
- Recorded: 2020–2024
- Length: 37:12
- Label: Bella Union; Congrats
- Producer: Sam Evian

Hannah Cohen chronology
Welcome Home (2019)	Earthstar Mountain (2025)

Singles from Earthstar Mountain
- 1. "Earthstar" Released: January 23, 2025

Earthstar Mountain is the fourth studio album by American singer Hannah Cohen. It was released on March 28, 2025, via Bella Union and Congrats Records in LP, CD and digital formats.

== Background ==
Preceded by Cohen's 2019 full-length album, Welcome Home, Earthstar Mountain was produced by Brooklyn-based instrumentalist Sam Evian. The writing and recording process occurred for the album from 2020 to 2024, at a studio owned by Flying Cloud Recordings. "Earthstar" was released as a single on January 23, 2025.

== Reception ==
Professional ratings
Review scores
Source	Rating
AllMusic	4/5 stars
Mojo	4/5 stars
MusicOMH	4/5 stars
New Noise	5/5 stars

In a five-star review for New Noise, Stefanie Sanchez noted, "Cohen's audacious rhythmic beauty and love for nature remain constant on this release." John Murphy of MusicOMH assigned the album a rating of four stars, calling it "a pretty mediative record" and "a laid-back record with a strong sense of place to play just as the day is taking shape while you contemplate life over a coffee." AllMusic's Marcy Donelson commented, "In addition to Earthstar Mountain's consistently warm soundscape, Cohen is at her most accomplished yet songwriting-wise." Giving it a rating of four stars for Mojo, Glyn Brown described the songs, "Dusty" as "shimmering, articulate pop rock" and "Draggin'" as "a droll pop-rocker".

== Track listing ==
Earthstar Mountain track listing
No.	Title	Length
1.	"Dusty"	4:05
2.	"Draggin'"	4:35
3.	"Mountain"	3:59
4.	"Earthstar"	4:03
5.	"Rag"	3:05
6.	"Una Spiaggia"	1:44
7.	"Summer Sweat"	4:06
8.	"Shoe"	3:23
9.	"Baby You're Lying"	3:22
10.	"Dog Years"	4:50
Total length:		37:12

== Personnel ==
Credits adapted from AllMusic.

- Brooke Stardrum – drums
- Claire Cottrill – clarinet, vocal harmony
- Daniel Freedman – drums
- Ennio Morricone – composer
- Hannah Cohen – composer, guitar (acoustic), primary artist, vocal harmony, vocals
- Liam Kazar – guitar (electric), vocals (background)
- Matt Bauder – flute
- Oliver Hill – viola, violin
- Sam Evian – producer
- Sam Owens – clarinet, double bass, drums, guitar, guitar (acoustic), guitar (bass), guitar (electric), organ (hammond), piano, recording, slide guitar, synthesizer
- Sean Mullins – drums, piano
- Sima Cunningham – vocals (background)
- Sufjan Stevens – piano, recording, vocals (background)
- Will Miller – flugelhorn
