= La Mia Vita Violenta =

Studio album by Blonde Redhead
- Released: September 4, 1995
- Recorded: May – June 1995
- Studio: Magic Shop, New York City; Water Music, New York City; Random Falls, New York City
- Genre: Indie rock; art rock; math rock; noise pop
- Length: 38:19
- Label: Smells Like
- Producer: Blonde Redhead

Blonde Redhead chronology
Blonde Redhead (1995)	La Mia Vita Violenta (1995)	Fake Can Be Just as Good (1997)

Singles from La Mia Vita Violenta
- 1. "Flying Douglas" / "Harmony" Released: February 1995; 2. "10 Feet High" / "Valentine" Released: June 1995

Professional ratings
Review scores
Source	Rating
AllMusic	3/5 stars
Spin	7/10

La Mia Vita Violenta (Italian for "My Violent Life") is the second studio album by American alternative rock band Blonde Redhead. It was released in September 4, 1995, by Smells Like Records.

== Track listing ==
All tracks are written by Kazu Makino, Amedeo Pace and Simone Pace, except where noted.

No.	Title	Lead vocals	Length
1.	"(I Am Taking Out My Eurotrash) I Still Get Rocks Off"	Makino, A. Pace	3:40
2.	"Violent Life"	A. Pace	3:51
3.	"U.F.O."	A. Pace	5:38
4.	"I Am There While You Choke on Me"	Makino	1:56
5.	"Harmony"	Makino	5:16
6.	"Down Under"	A. Pace, Makino	4:09
7.	"Bean"	A. Pace, Makino	4:37
8.	"Young Neil"	A. Pace	4:38
9.	"10 Feet High" (Makino, A. Pace, S. Pace, Maki Takahashi)	Makino	3:22
10.	"Jewel"	Makino	1:12
Total length:			38:19

== Personnel ==
Credits are adapted from the liner notes of La Mia Vita Violenta and the 2016 compilation album Masculin Féminin.

Blonde Redhead

- Kazu Makino – guitar, vocals
- Amedeo Pace – guitar, vocals
- Simone Pace – drums
- Toko Yasuda – bass

Additional musicians

- Tada Hirano – keyboard on "(I Am Taking Out My Eurotrash) I Still Get Rocks Off" and "I Am There While You Choke on Me"
- Tombi Thokchom – sitar on "Harmony"

Production

- Blonde Redhead – production
- Edward Douglas – recording
- John Siket – mixing
- Mark Venezia – recording

Design

- Stefano Giovannini – photography (band photograph)
- John Kelsey – cover design
- Carissa Rodriguez – cover design
