= Alex Gross =

American painter

- Born: Alex Gross; August 30, 1968 (age 58); Roslyn Heights, New York
- Education: Art Center College of Design
- Known for: Painter
- Website: www.alexgross.com

Alex Gross (born August 30, 1968) is a visual artist currently working in Portland, Oregon. He specializes in oil paintings on canvas whose themes include globalization, commerce, beauty, dark mayhem, and the passage of time.

Gross graduated in 1990 from Art Center College of Design, in Pasadena, California. Since then, he has become established as an artist in the Pop Surrealism movement.

In 2000, Gross received a fellowship from the Japan Foundation. He spent two months traveling throughout Japan, researching and collecting a variety of Japanese Fine and Commercial art, as research for his own artwork. Part of his collection was compiled and published by Taschen under the title Japanese Beauties in 2004.

In 2006, Chronicle books published The Art of Alex Gross, a monograph featuring Gross' painting, drawing and printmaking from 1999 through 2007. Science Fiction author Bruce Sterling penned the introduction to the book. His art has been featured in numerous publications including the book Pop Surrealism, Juxtapoz, Los Angeles Magazine, Communication Arts, Taiwanese magazine XFUNS, and the Los Angeles Times.

In August, 2007. California State Fullerton's Grand Central Art Center hosted a retrospective museum show featuring an array of Gross' work from different periods throughout his career. In a review of the museum show, the Orange County Register wrote that "Gross' work is highly representational and, unlike many of his contemporaries lumped into the so-called low-brow art niche, he is an excellent draftsman. He also demands that one know a bit about world culture, history and politics and have the wit to appreciate his sense of irony."

Gross' work was also featured in the Laguna Art Museum's exhibition and catalogue "In the land of Retinal Delights", in July, 2008. His work has been featured on the cover of the band Blonde Redhead's album 23, as well as on the cover of the paperback version of After Dark, the national bestseller by Haruki Murakami, published by Vintage Books.
