= Nocturne in E-flat major =

The Nocturne in E-flat major may refer to:

- Notturno (Schubert), Op. 148 (D. 897), by Franz Schubert
- Nocturne in E-flat major, Op. 9, No. 2 by Frédéric Chopin (the most well-known)
- Nocturne in E-flat major, Op. 55, No. 2 by Frédéric Chopin
