= Sit Down for Dinner =

Studio album by Blonde Redhead
- Released: September 29, 2023
- Length: 48:22
- Language: English
- Label: Section1
- Producer: Blonde Redhead

Blonde Redhead chronology
Masculin Féminin (2016)	Sit Down for Dinner (2023)

“I’ve been quite aggressively chasing some kind of independence. I could see [my bandmates] were a little intimidated, so I took advantage of that. My approach is a weird combination of naiveness and experience.”

—Kazu Makino on writing and recording Sit Down for Dinner

Sit Down for Dinner is the tenth studio album by American alternative rock band Blonde Redhead. It was released on September 29, 2023 by Section1 and has received positive reviews from critics.

== Recording and release ==
This is the first full-length studio album from the band since 2014's Barragán and writing for this music began in 2018. As the songs came together over the course of several years, themes of aging, death, and mourning began to emerge and frontwoman Kazu Makino has specifically cited Joan Didion's The Year of Magical Thinking as an influence on the album.

== Reception ==
Professional ratings
Aggregate scores
Source	Rating
AnyDecentMusic?	7.7/10
Metacritic	82/100
Review scores
Source	Rating
AllMusic	4/5 stars

Editors at AllMusic rated this album 4 out of 5 stars, with critic Heather Phares writing that "the trio brings its quintessentially elegant, mysterious music down to earth" on this album. Editors at online retailer Bandcamp chose this for Album of the Day and critic Elle Carroll calling it "a proudly simple and deeply felt record". This was album of the week at BrooklynVegan's Indie Basement, with Bill Pearis writing that it is one of the band's best and that it continues the "sweeping wistful vibe" of their music and it was included in the best albums of September as well. In Exclaim!, Dylan Barnabe scored this release an 8 out of 10, calling it "a homecoming nine years in the making" that displays the playfulness of the band. In Guitar World, Andrew Daly noted the interplay between guitarists Kazu Makino and Amadeo Pace, particularly the former's unique style and how it creates the core of this album's sonics. At The Line of Best Fit, critic Simon Heavisides rated this work an 8 out of 10 for being "a reminder of the random fragility of existence" that is "full of subtlety and deft unshowy skill" and "devastatingly gorgeous".

Critics at All Songs Considered chose this as one of the five best albums of the week. Pitchfork's Stuart Berman rated Sit Down for Dinner a 7.5 out of 10, writing that "though it goes a long way to reinstating Blonde Redhead’s singular mystique and impressionistic aura, Sit Down for Dinner is distinguished by an easygoing melodicism that, even in its darkest lyrical depths, makes it the warmest and most welcoming record in the band’s catalog". Jon M. Gilbertstein of Shepherd Express favorably compared this album to Yo La Tengo, noting a mixture of musical influences and characterizes the album as "like a compilation of missives from a band that didn't make more music until it felt sure it had more music to make" rather than "a cliched return to form or an attempt to justify a long absence". In Under the Radar, Mark Redfern chose the two halves of the title track to spotlight as some of the best songs of the week and Matt the Raven later scored the album a 7.5 out of 10, stating that it "doesn’t quite capture the magic and sonically bright tunefulness from the previously mentioned albums, but it has enough of the genuine Blonde Redhead brilliance, especially those parts with Makino’s lush voice, to make it a worthwhile listening investment".

In Glide Magazine, Ryan Dillon chose "Kiss Her Kiss Her" as one of the best songs of the week, calling it "an early favorite with the heaven-sent vocals slicing through a dense arrangement that swells into a synth-pop-style anthem".

Editors of Vogue included this in an unranked list of the 22 best albums of the year, published on October 23, 2023, with critic Nicole Phelps noting that it is on "high rotation on my Spotify account". Editors at Pitchfork included this in their list of the 37 best rock albums of 2023. John Meagher of Irish Independent chose "Snowman" as the tenth best foreign song of 2023. Editors at AllMusic included this on their list of favorite alternative and indie albums of 2023. This was included in the 40 best independent albums of 2023 in BrooklynVegan's Indie Basement. At Under the Radar, this was rated the 18th best album of 2023 and critic Mark Redfern chose it as one of his favorites of the year.

== Track listing ==
1. "Snowman" – 5:15
2. "Kiss Her Kiss Her" – 4:22
3. "Not for Me" – 4:14
4. "Melody Experiment" – 5:10
5. "Rest of Her Life" – 3:15
6. "Sit Down for Dinner (Part 1)" – 3:11
7. "Sit Down for Dinner (Part 2)" – 3:28
8. "I Thought You Should Know" – 5:24
9. "Before" – 4:28
10. "If" – 4:22
11. "Via Savona" – 5:13

== Personnel ==
Blonde Redhead

- Kazu Makino – rhythm guitar, keyboards, vocals (lead on 2, 4–7, 9)
- Amedeo Pace – lead guitar, bass, keyboards, vocals (lead on 1, 3, 8, 10)
- Simone Pace – drums, keyboards

Additional personnel

- Blonde Redhead – production
- Collin Fletcher – graphic design
- Heba Kadry – mastering in New York City, New York, United States
- Kazu Makino – artwork

== Charts ==
Chart performance for Sit Down for Dinner
Chart (2023)	Peak position
Belgian Albums (Ultratop Flanders)	91
French Albums (SNEP)	127
UK Independent Albums (OCC)	50

== See also ==
- 2023 in American music
- List of 2023 albums
