= Laptop (disambiguation) =

A laptop is a personal computer for mobile use.

Laptop may also refer to:

- Laptop (band), an American band, formed in 1997 by Jesse Hartman
- Laptop (2008 film), a 2008 Malayalam film
- Laptop (2012 film), a 2012 Bengali film
- $LAPTOP, a meme coin launched in September 2026 by American businessman Hunter Biden
