= Seven Two =

Seven Two may refer to:

- "Seven Two", song from the album Barragán by the rock band Blonde Redhead
- 72 (number)
- 7two, Australian television channel from the Seven Network
- 7_{2}, the Alexander–Briggs notation of a twist knot with five half-twists
