= Denise (Fountains of Wayne song) =

Single by Fountains of Wayne

from the album Utopia Parkway
- Released: March 8, 1999
- Genre: Power pop; rock n' roll
- Length: 2:33
- Label: Atlantic
- Songwriters: Chris Collingwood; Adam Schlesinger
- Producers: Collingwood; Schlesinger

Fountains of Wayne singles chronology
"Leave the Biker" (1998)	"Denise" (1999)	"Red Dragon Tattoo" (1999)

Music video
- "Denise" on YouTube

"Denise" is a song by American rock band Fountains of Wayne. It was released on March 8, 1999, as the lead single from their second studio album, Utopia Parkway. Though the song only saw minor success in the United States, reaching number 34 on the Alternative Airplay chart, it peaked at number 57 on the UK Singles Chart and number 58 on the Scottish Singles Chart.

== Background and composition ==
"Denise" was written and produced by Chris Collingwood and Adam Schlesinger. The track is described as power pop and rock n' roll. Lyrically, the song tells a story about "a cold-hearted travel agent." It is also an ode to Weezer.

According to Collingwood, Schlesinger had a demo version of the song, which he showed to him, featuring the same lyrics, but had a gentle melody, that Collingwood "preferred" over the official recording.

== Critical reception ==
Professional ratings
Review scores
Source	Rating
AllMusic	2.5/5 stars

Michael Frey of AllMusic called the track a "highlight" from Utopia Parkway, remarking, "Few bands are capable of combining humor and pop hooks to results that reach beyond simple novelty, but, as evidenced on this track, Fountains of Wayne have perfected the art." He also praised the non-album tracks "I'll Do the Driving" and "I Know You Well", praising the melodies, harmonies and hooks. Mike Bederka of Westnet stated the song "breaks the mold and turns up the guitars and distortion a bit." On Billboard's "Adam Schlesinger's 15 Greatest Songs" list, Morgan Enos wrote, "'Denise' is more silly and whimsical than substantial, but it's a great example of how Schlesinger, with seeming effortlessness, could write a power-pop melody that made you weak in the knees."

== Chart performance ==
The song peaked at number 34 on the US Alternative Airplay chart. It also reached number 57 and number 58 on the UK Singles Chart and Scottish Singles Chart, respectively.

== Music video ==
The music video for "Denise" premiered via MTV on April 13, 1999, directed by Tryan George. Centered as a car-wash-themed video, Schlesinger told MTV News the idea behind the video stating, "It sort of ended up being this combination of a Devo video and a Whitesnake video or something. We've got this New Wave look going on and then we've got this really mid-'80s, heavy metal, sexist car-wash dousing."

Actress Jolene Blalock plays "Denise", who according to Schlesinger, stated she "worked about 14 hours straight" on the set.

== Track listing ==
CD single
No.	Title	Length
1.	"Denise"	2:33
2.	"I Know You Well"	3:26
3.	"I'll Do the Driving"	3:27

== Personnel ==
Credits for "Denise" retrieved from album's liner notes.

Fountains of Wayne

- Chris Collingwood – lead vocals, rhythm guitar
- Jody Porter – lead guitar, backing vocals
- Adam Schlesinger – bass, synthesizers, backing vocals
- Brian Young – drums, percussion

Production

- Adam Schlesinger – producer
- Chris Collingwood – producer
- John Siket – engineer, mixing
- Vladimir Meller – mastering
- Mike Denneen – mixing

== Charts ==
Chart performance for "Denise"
Chart (1999)	Peak position
Scotland Singles (OCC)	58
UK Singles (OCC)	57
US Alternative Airplay (Billboard)	34

== Release history ==
Release dates and formats for "Denise"
Region	Date	Format	Label	Ref.
United Kingdom	March 8, 1999	CD	Atlantic	
