= Plunge (Sam Evian album) =

Studio album by Sam Evian
- Released: March 22, 2024
- Studio: Flying Cloud (New York)
- Genre: Power pop; psychedelic
- Length: 33:27
- Label: Flying Cloud; Thirty Tigers
- Producer: Sam Evian

Sam Evian chronology
Time to Melt (2021)	Plunge (2024)

Plunge is the fourth studio album by American singer-songwriter Sam Evian, released on March 22, 2024, through Flying Cloud Recordings and Thirty Tigers. It received positive reviews from critics.

== Recording and title ==
The album was recorded live to tape at Flying Cloud Studios in upstate New York and includes contributions from Evian's partner Hannah Cohen, Liam Kazar, El Kempner of Palehound, and Adrianne Lenker of Big Thief. The album was named for Evian taking daily polar plunges.

== Critical reception ==
Professional ratings
Aggregate scores
Source	Rating
Metacritic	79/100
Review scores
Source	Rating
AllMusic	4/5 stars
Paste	7.1/10
Uncut	7/10
Under the Radar	8/10 stars

Plunge received a score of 79 out of 100 on review aggregator Metacritic based on five critics' reviews, indicating "generally favorable" reception. Uncut found it to be "a loose, luscious listen, with a timeless sound". Glide Magazine's Ryan Dillon commented that Evian's "status as a producer shines on this album as the artist pieces together a plethora of emotions and sets them to even more expansive and awe-inspiring arrangements".

AllMusic's Marcy Donelson felt that "its breezy mix of radio-friendly, late-'60s and '70s singer/songwriter, psychedelic, and power pop brings it closer in line with cited inspirations like the Beatles, solo George Harrison, and Harry Nilsson, among many others". Sean Fennell of Paste said that although Plunge is not very distinct from his prior work, "there is nothing diminishing about the returns this time around—especially when you consider just how pristine a sound Evian is able to pull from his impressive cast of collaborators on this occasion". Under the Radar's Mark Moody called it "blessed with tight writing, surefire melodies, and a cast of all-star musicians" and found it "well worth jumping into".

== Track listing ==
All tracks are written by Samuel Griffin Owens.

Plunge track listing
No.	Title	Length
1.	"Wild Days"	3:39
2.	"Jacket"	3:11
3.	"Rollin' In"	4:44
4.	"Why Does It Take So Long"	4:03
5.	"Freakz"	3:22
6.	"Wind Blows"	4:04
7.	"Runaway"	4:23
8.	"Another Way"	2:44
9.	"Stay"	3:17
Total length:		33:27

== Personnel ==
Musicians

- Sam Evian – lead vocals
- Hannah Cohen – background vocals (tracks 2, 4, 7)
- Megan Lui – background vocals (tracks 2, 7)
- Adrianne Lenker – background vocals (track 4)
- Liam Kazar – background vocals (track 4)
- Michael Coleman – background vocals (track 4)
- Santiago Mijares – background vocals (track 4)
- Sean Mullins – background vocals (track 4)
- Zhana Whyche – background vocals (track 4)

Technical

- Sam Evian – production, mixing, engineering
- Heba Kadry – mastering
- Phil Weinrobe – co-production, engineering (tracks 3, 4)
- Adrianne Lenker – co-production (track 3)

Visuals

- Riley Donahue – design
- CJ Harvey – photography
- Josh Goleman – photography
