= Silently =

"Silently" may refer to:

- "Silently", a song by Trust Company from True Parallels (2005)
- "Silently", a song by Blonde Redhead from 23 (2007)
