= Penny Sparkle =

Studio album by Blonde Redhead
- Released: September 13, 2010
- Studio: The Magic Shop, New York City; Sear Sound, New York City; DNA, New York City
- Genre: Dream pop; shoegaze; electropop; synth-pop
- Length: 43:56
- Label: 4AD
- Producer: Blonde Redhead; Van Rivers & the Subliminal Kid; Drew Brown; Alan Moulder

Blonde Redhead chronology
23 (2007)	Penny Sparkle (2010)	Barragán (2014)

Singles from Penny Sparkle
- 1. "Here Sometimes" Released: August 24, 2010; 2. "Not Getting There" Released: November 1, 2010

Professional ratings
Aggregate scores
Source	Rating
AnyDecentMusic?	6.0/10
Metacritic	64/100
Review scores
Source	Rating
AllMusic	4/5 stars
Alternative Press	3.5/5 stars
The A.V. Club	B−
The Guardian	2/5 stars
The Irish Times	4/5 stars
Mojo	3/5 stars
NME	8/10
Pitchfork	4.0/10
Spin	6/10
Uncut	3/5 stars

Penny Sparkle is the eighth studio album by American alternative rock band Blonde Redhead. The album was released by 4AD on September 13, 2010, internationally, and on the following day in the USA.

== Track listing ==
All tracks are written by Blonde Redhead (Kazu Makino, Amedeo Pace and Simone Pace). All lead vocals by Makino, except where noted.

No.	Title	Length
1.	"Here Sometimes"	4:43
2.	"Not Getting There"	2:46
3.	"Will There Be Stars" (lead vocals: A. Pace)	4:27
4.	"My Plants Are Dead"	4:17
5.	"Love or Prison"	6:13
6.	"Oslo"	3:54
7.	"Penny Sparkle"	4:33
8.	"Everything Is Wrong"	2:49
9.	"Black Guitar" (lead vocals: A. Pace, Makino)	5:19
10.	"Spain"	4:55
Total length:		43:56

iTunes Store edition bonus track
No.	Title	Length
11.	"Untitled"	3:03
Total length:		46:59

Japanese edition bonus tracks
No.	Title	Length
11.	"Untitled"	3:03
12.	"Love or Prison" (Kastellet mix)	4:39
Total length:		51:38

== Personnel ==
Credits are adapted from the album's liner notes.

Blonde Redhead

- Kazu Makino
- Amedeo Pace
- Simone Pace

Additional musicians

- Davíð Þór Jónsson – keyboards on "Penny Sparkle"
- Walter Sear – modular Moog synthesizer

Production

- Blonde Redhead – production
- Drew Brown – additional engineering and production
- Chris Coady – additional engineering
- Kabir Hermon – engineering (assistant)
- Alan Moulder – mixing, additional production
- Geoff Pesche – mastering
- David Schoenwetter – engineering (assistant)
- Brian Thorn – engineering (assistant)
- Van Rivers & the Subliminal Kid – production, engineering

Design

- Kazu Makino – design
- Triboro – design

== Charts ==
Chart (2010)	Peak position
Belgian Albums (Ultratop Flanders)	57
Belgian Albums (Ultratop Wallonia)	65
French Albums (SNEP)	89
Greek Albums (IFPI)	18
UK Independent Albums (OCC)	41
US Billboard 200	79
US Independent Albums (Billboard)	16
US Top Alternative Albums (Billboard)	18
US Top Rock Albums (Billboard)	29
