= Melody of Certain Damaged Lemons =

Studio album by Blonde Redhead
- Released: June 6, 2000
- Recorded: January 25 – February 16, 2000
- Studio: Bear Creek (Woodinville, Washington)
- Genre: Art punk
- Length: 39:26
- Label: Touch and Go
- Producer: Guy Picciotto; Ryan Hadlock

Blonde Redhead chronology
In an Expression of the Inexpressible (1998)	Melody of Certain Damaged Lemons (2000)	Mélodie Citronique (2000)

Melody of Certain Damaged Lemons is the fifth studio album by American alternative rock band Blonde Redhead. It was released on June 6, 2000 by Touch and Go Records. The album was recorded at Bear Creek Studio in Woodinville, and was produced by Guy Picciotto and Ryan Hadlock.

The final song on Melody of Certain Damaged Lemons, "For the Damaged Coda", is based on Nocturne in F minor, Op. 55, No. 1 by Frédéric Chopin. Years after the album's release, "For the Damaged Coda" gained renewed exposure after appearing in the animated TV series Rick and Morty as the recurring theme for the character Evil Morty.

== Critical reception ==
Professional ratings
Aggregate scores
Source	Rating
Metacritic	73/100
Review scores
Source	Rating
AllMusic	4/5 stars
NME	8/10
Pitchfork	7.8/10
Q	2/5 stars
Spin	8/10
Under the Radar	8.5/10

Melody of Certain Damaged Lemons was met with generally favorable reviews from critics. At Metacritic, which assigns a normalized rating out of 100 to reviews from mainstream publications, the album received an average score of 73 based on eight reviews.

== Track listing ==
All tracks are written by Blonde Redhead (Kazu Makino, Amedeo Pace and Simone Pace). All lead vocals are by Makino, except where noted.

No.	Title	Lead vocals	Length
1.	"Equally Damaged"	instrumental	0:40
2.	"In Particular"		6:05
3.	"Melody of Certain Three"	A. Pace	3:53
4.	"Hated Because of Great Qualities"		4:42
5.	"Loved Despite of Great Faults"	A. Pace	4:12
6.	"Ballad of Lemons"	instrumental	1:54
7.	"This Is Not"		4:50
8.	"A Cure"	A. Pace, Makino	5:23
9.	"For the Damaged"		3:02
10.	"Mother"		2:08
11.	"For the Damaged Coda" (unlisted on back cover, but listed in liner notes with an asterisk)		2:37
Total length:			39:26

Japanese edition bonus tracks
No.	Title	Lead vocals	Length
12.	"En particulier" (French version of "In Particular")		4:08
13.	"Odiata per le sue virtú" (Italian version of "Hated Because of Great Qualities")		4:44
14.	"Chi é e non é"	A. Pace	3:38
15.	"Four Damaged Lemons" (alternate version of "For the Damaged")		5:11
Total length:			57:07

== Personnel ==
Credits are adapted from the album's liner notes.

Blonde Redhead

- Kazu Makino
- Amedeo Pace
- Simone Pace

Additional personnel

- Toby Christensen – piano on "Loved Despite of Great Faults", "A Cure", "For the Damaged" and "For the Damaged Coda"
- Ryan Hadlock – production, engineering
- Guy Picciotto – production
- Howie Weinberg – mastering
- Brad Zeffren – engineering (second)
