= Johanna Samuels =

American folk musician

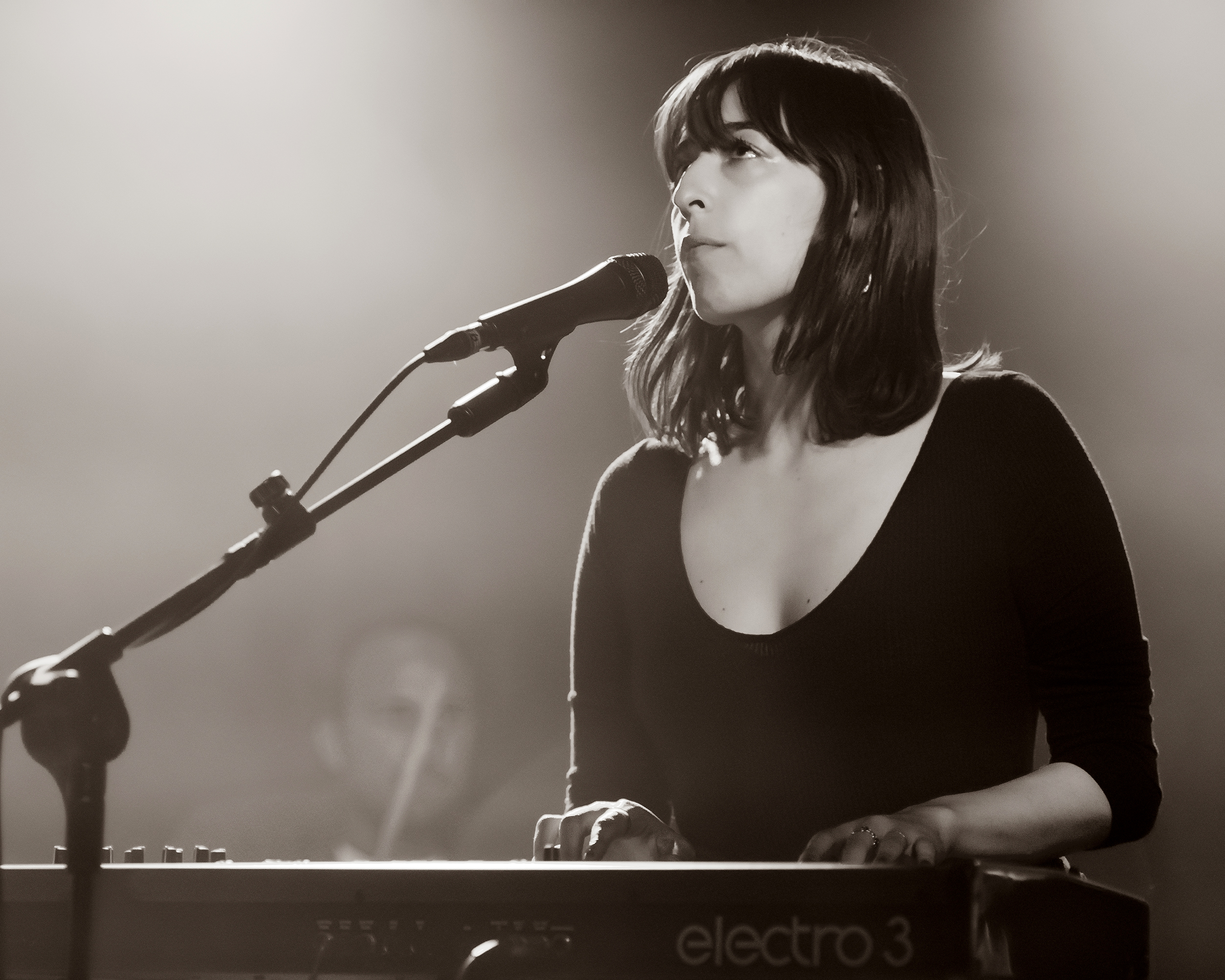
- Samuels performing in LA, 2018

Background information
- Origin: New York, U.S.
- Years active: 2007–present
- Website: www.johannasamuels.com

Johanna Samuels is an American folk musician from New York, who now resides in Los Angeles.

== History ==
Samuels originated from New York City, where she began her music career, before relocating to Los Angeles. She is deeply influenced by Americana acts of the 1970s and '80s, such as the Band, Gene Clark, and especially Tom Petty. Samuels released her debut full-length album in 2013 titled Double Bind. Samuels followed up that release in 2016 with her first EP titled Home & Dry: Told a Lie. Samuels released her second EP in 2019 titled Have a Good One. In 2021, Samuels released her second full-length album titled Excelsior!, which was produced by Sam Evian. She then partnered with producer Josh Kaufman of Bonny Light Horseman to produce her third full-length record Bystander, released in June 2023 on the Jealous Butcher label.

In 2024, she formed the band Lomaland with fellow Los Angeles musician Tyler Ballgame.

On May 20, 2026, Samuels announced her fourth LP, Sorry, Kid, which will be released on August 14 on Jealous Butcher and Odd Man Out. The album was recorded, produced and features instrumentation by Jonathan Rado (Foxygen, the Killers, Miley Cyrus), as well as backing vocals from Lomaland bandmate Tyler Ballgame.

Samuels has toured and collaborated with artists such as Australian folk singer and King Gizzard & the Lizard Wizard cohort Leah Senior, Madison Cunningham, Guster, Watchhouse, Cassandra Jenkins, Fruit Bats, Faye Webster, the Hold Steady, Bonny Light Horseman, Lomelda, Courtney Marie Andrews, Tallest Man on Earth, Anaïs Mitchell, Haley Heynderickx, Joanna Sternberg, and others.

== Discography ==
=== Studio albums ===
- Double Bind (2013)
- Excelsior (2021)
- Bystander (2023)
- Sorry, Kid (2026)

=== Extended plays ===
- Home & Dry: Told a Lie (2016)
- Have a Good One (2019)
- Scam Likely (2022)
- First and the Last (2024)
