= Sammy (band) =

American alternative rock band

Background information
- Origin: New York, New York, United States
- Genres: Alternative rock; indie rock
- Years active: 1994–1996
- Labels: Smells Like Records; DGC; Geffen; Fire Records (UK)
- Past members: Luke Wood; Jesse Hartman; Al Hartland; Tony Maxwell

Sammy was the partnership of guitarist Luke Wood and guitarist/vocalist Jesse Hartman. The band was initially signed to Smells Like Records, the label owned by Sonic Youth drummer Steve Shelley. Later the band signed to DGC/Geffen. The band was signed to Fire Records in the UK and Europe.

The band released two albums, an EP, and multiple singles before calling it quits. Debut Album (issued in 1994) and Kings of the Island Empire (an EP issued in 1995) were both put out by Smells Like Records. Their second and final full-length, Tales of Great Neck Glory, which was issued by DGC/Geffen, followed in 1996 shortly before the band decided to split up.

== Discography ==
- Debut Album Album (1994)
- Kings of the Inland Empire EP (1995) -- featured drummer Tony Maxwell from the band that dog.
- Tales of Great Neck Glory Album (1996) -- featured Mike Corn & Brendan O'Malley from the band Love Child and Alexis Fleisig from Girls Against Boys.
