= Adult Baby (album) =

Studio album by Kazu
- Released: September 13, 2019
- Studio: Figure 8 Recording; Pioneer Work; The End; Officine Meccaniche; Voxton
- Length: 41:48
- Label: Adult Baby
- Producer: Kazu Makino; Sam Griffin Owens

Adult Baby is the debut studio album by Kazu Makino under the mononym Kazu. It was released on September 13, 2019, through Adult Baby Records. It received generally favorable reviews from critics.

== Background ==
Kazu Makino is a Japanese-born musician. She is a member of the New York trio Blonde Redhead, along with the twin brothers Amedeo and Simone Pace. Adult Baby is her debut solo record. The album is produced by Makino and Sam Griffin Owens. It includes contributions from Ryuichi Sakamoto, Mauro Refosco, Greg Saunier, Amedeo Pace, and Ian Chang. At the time, she was based in the Italian island of Elba and New York City. Recording took place in New York, Berlin, and Milan. The album was released on September 13, 2019, through Makino's own Adult Baby Records, with distribution from !K7.

As for the album's title, Makino said, "The title came to me when an old friend told me about the existence of so-called 'adult baby club', frequented by powerful men who go there to be treated like small children." She added, "This discovery struck me, perhaps because I am convinced that in a way, we are all adult babies, that many people feel that way inside and that they identify with this expression."

Nosaj Thing's remix of "Salty", Jacques Greene's remix of "Meo", Alva Noto's remix of "Come Behind Me, So Good!", and the live version of "Unsure in Waves" were released digitally.

== Critical reception ==
Professional ratings
Aggregate scores
Source	Rating
Metacritic	71/100
Review scores
Source	Rating
Pitchfork	6.8/10
PopMatters	7/10
Spectrum Culture	3/5
Under the Radar	6/10

According to the review aggregator Metacritic, Adult Baby received "generally favorable reviews" based on a weighted average score of 71 out of 100 from 6 critic scores.

Philip Sherburne of Pitchfork commented that "Adult Baby works best with the volume turned up, a soft mattress beneath you, all distractions on hold." He added, "And even though the music often resists forming into anything as solid as a hook, Makino's vaporous melodies have a way of creeping up on you long after the record has stopped spinning; they have a sneaky tenacity, like a dream you can't shake, even if you can't quite remember its particulars." Matt the Raven of Under the Radar stated, "Overall, Adult Baby is an inconsistent album that can be a wistful and sluggish electronic experiment but also shows flashes of brilliance with a genuinely entertaining mix of dream pop and electronica brought to life with a beautiful voice."

== Track listing ==
All tracks are written by Kazu Makino, except "Meo" by Makino and Amedeo Pace.

Adult Baby track listing
No.	Title	Length
1.	"Salty"	5:07
2.	"Come Behind Me, So Good!"	4:04
3.	"Meo"	5:21
4.	"Adult Baby"	5:26
5.	"Place of Birth"	1:53
6.	"Name and Age"	3:29
7.	"Unsure in Waves"	5:26
8.	"Undo"	5:44
9.	"Coyote"	5:18
Total length:		41:48

== Personnel ==
Credits adapted from liner notes.

- Kazu Makino – vocals, CS60 (1, 3–9), loops (1, 3, 4), drum machine programming (2), Yamaha VSS (4–6, 8, 9), ARP 2600 (5), piano (6), Oberheim SEM (6), modular synthesizer (6), Roland JP-8 (8), production
- Sam Griffin Owens – tape loops (1), guitar (2, 6), drum machine programming (7), Moog modular (9), production, recording, mixing
- Ryuichi Sakamoto – piano (1, 3), chimes (1), triangle (1), loops (1), organic instruments (2, 7), synthesizer (3, 7), field recording (5), samples (5, 7)
- Mauro Refosco – percussion (1, 9)
- Ian Chang – Sunhouse percussion (1, 4), drums (2, 4, 6, 7), vocal samples (4)
- Ian McLellan Davis – orchestral arrangement (2–4)
- Budapest Art Orchestra – orchestration (2–4)
- Robbie Lee – flute (3)
- Amedeo Pace – baritone guitar (3), loops (8)
- Greg Saunier – drums (3, 8)
- Clarice Jensen – cello (7)
- Francesco Donadello – additional recording
- Heba Kadry – mastering
- Titti Santini – executive production
- Gelman – design, typography
- Stefano Masselli – original cover photography
- Francesco Trambaioli – lighting on cover photography
