= River of Grass =

- Theatrical release poster
- Directed by: Kelly Reichardt
- Screenplay by: Kelly Reichardt
- Story by: Jesse Hartman; Kelly Reichardt
- Produced by: Jesse Hartman
- Starring: Lisa Bowman; Larry Fessenden; Dick Russell; Stan Kaplan; Michael Buscemi
- Cinematography: Jim Denault
- Edited by: Larry Fessenden
- Music by: John Hill
- Distributed by: Strand Releasing
- Release date: January 1994 (Sundance Film Festival): October 13, 1995; (limited theatrical)
- Running time: 76 minutes
- Country: United States
- Language: English

River of Grass is a 1994 American independent film directed by Kelly Reichardt in her feature film directorial debut. Reichardt wrote the screenplay from a story by her and Jesse Hartman. It was selected for the Sundance Film Festival and the Berlin International Film Festival, and was nominated for the Sundance Grand Jury Prize and four Independent Spirit Awards.

The film is set in the Broward and Dade Counties of Florida, between Miami and the Everglades (nicknamed "the River of Grass"). The story concerns two unhappy runaways who attempt to flee South Florida after getting involved in a shooting incident. Inspired by Terrence Malick's Badlands (1973), the film subverts common crime drama and road movie tropes; Reichardt explained that she and Hartman wanted to understand "how the lone-rebel, a fixture in every road movie, could exist in the '90s when even the Burger King slogan tells you to 'Break the Rules.'" The film ultimately suggests that the protagonists are as interested in fleeing their unsatisfying lives back home as they are in fleeing the police.

== Plot ==
Cozy is a dissatisfied housewife in her thirties who feels no emotional connection with her children. She lives in Dade County with her husband, and also her father, Jimmy, a taciturn crime scene investigator and erstwhile jazz drummer. When Jimmy loses his gun, his loutish boss suspends him, and the gun is found by Lee Ray Harold, a deadbeat living in adjacent Broward County with his elderly grandmother. When Harold threatens his grandmother with the gun, his grandmother kicks him out of the house.

Driving and shooting the gun recklessly, Lee nearly runs over Cozy as she walks to a local bar. Cozy confronts Lee in the bar, and Lee buys her a drink. He convinces her to break into a friend's home and swim in the pool. While Lee shows Cozy how to use the gun, the owner of the pool comes out to investigate, and the gun goes off.

Believing they have killed the man, Cozy and Lee hide out in a hotel and engage in various low-level shenanigans, including stealing and selling vinyl records from Lee's grandmother to pay for gas. Lee considers robbing a grocery store only for another robber to hold up the store instead and make off with the cash. Lee then tries to get money back from a pair of unused Greyhound Bus tickets to New York, but then flees the terminal when the ticketing agents regard him with suspicion.

The police forensics lab reveals that Lee's gun was the same gun that Jimmy lost. Lee encounters their supposed victim, alive and well, but does not tell Cozy. The police consider putting out an APB for the two, but without a victim, the police don't see them as a high priority, and Jimmy persuades his colleagues to hold off.

When Lee is pulled over at a toll station and the policeman lets him off with a warning, Cozy realizes that they are not wanted for murder. Lee tries to explain his deception; Cozy shoots him and drives away. The film ends with Cozy stuck in traffic.

== Cast ==
- Lisa Donaldson as Cozy
- Larry Fessenden as Lee Ray Harold
- Dick Russell as Jimmy Rider
- Stan Kaplan as J.C.
- Michael Buscemi as Doug

== Themes and conception ==
Reichardt grew up in the part of Florida the film depicts. She has described the film as "[a] road movie without the road, a love story without the love, and a crime story without the crime." Her subsequent films, such as Wendy and Lucy and Meek's Cutoff, involve similar themes, of people trying to leave a place but frustrated by their lack of resources. Of that theme, Reichardt said, "I guess it's just a good setup for different kinds of searching: question-asking, looking for the next place to go, what are you looking for, what are you leaving. All those things are good for grounding it in getting from point A to point B."

== Festivals and theatrical release ==
River of Grass debuted in competition at the Sundance Film Festival in January 1994, and then played at the Berlin International Film Festival in February 1994. Its theatrical debut was in New York City at The Public Theater on August 4, 1995, which was followed by a limited release in the U.S. on October 13, 1995. It was shown at the Buenos Aires International Festival of Independent Cinema on March 30, 2009.

=== Re-release ===
In January 2015, distributor Oscilloscope Laboratories launched a Kickstarter in order to digitally restore the film. In December, the Sundance Film Festival announced that they would be showing a special screening of the film at the 2016 Sundance Film Festival. A limited theatrical re-release was planned for March 2016.

== Critical reception ==
The New York Times film critic Stephen Holden described River of Grass as having "the look and feel of a sophisticated home movie featuring everyday people instead of actors." He praised the film's evocation of "a sense of suffocating ennui," but criticized the story as too "sketchily told" and the dialogue as too "fragmentary" for the film to cohere.

== Accolades ==
Year	Ceremony	Recipient	Category	Result
1994	Sundance Film Festival	Kelly Reichardt	Grand Jury Prize: Dramatic	Nominated
1995	Independent Spirit Awards	Lisa Donaldson	Best Debut Performance	Nominated
1995	Independent Spirit Awards	Kelly Reichardt	Best First Feature	Nominated
1995	Independent Spirit Awards	Kelly Reichardt	Best First Screenplay	Nominated
1995	Independent Spirit Awards	Kelly Reichardt	Someone to Watch Award	Nominated
