= For the Damaged Coda =

2000 song by Blonde Redhead

Song by Blonde Redhead

from the album Melody of Certain Damaged Lemons
- Released: June 6, 2000
- Studio: Bear Creek Studio (Woodinville, Washington)
- Genre: Progressive rock
- Length: 2:37
- Label: Touch & Go
- Songwriters: Kazu Makino; Amedeo Pace; Simone Pace
- Producers: Guy Picciotto; Ryan Hadlock

Audio video
- "For the Damaged Coda" on YouTube

"For the Damaged Coda" is a song written and performed by American indie rock band Blonde Redhead. It was released on June 6, 2000 via Touch and Go Records as the eleventh and final track on their fifth studio album Melody of Certain Damaged Lemons.

The song is a reprise of the bridge of "For the Damaged," which itself is based on Frédéric Chopin's Nocturne in F minor, Op. 55, No. 1, and gained renewed exposure on April 7, 2014 when it was used in Close Rick-counters of the Rick Kind, an episode of the animated television series Rick and Morty, as "Evil Morty's Theme Song", the theme for the character "Evil Morty" Smith. It has since become an internet meme. It was also included in The Rick And Morty Soundtrack. The song was sampled in B.o.B.'s 2017 song "BoBiverse".

== Charts ==
Chart (2017)	Peak position
US Hot Rock & Alternative Songs (Billboard)	15

== YouTube ==
A video with album cover art was first uploaded to YouTube on February 5, 2008, and has over 49 million views as of October, 2023. The official upload from October 24, 2017 has over 5.5 million views.

== Personnel ==
- Kazu Makino – wordless vocals
- Amedeo Pace – bass guitar
- Simone Pace – drums
- Tobias Nathaniel – piano

Production

- Ryan Hadlock – engineering, producing
- Guy Picciotto – producing
- Brad Zeffren – engineering
- Howie Weinberg – mastering
