= Luke Wood (music executive) =

Music executive

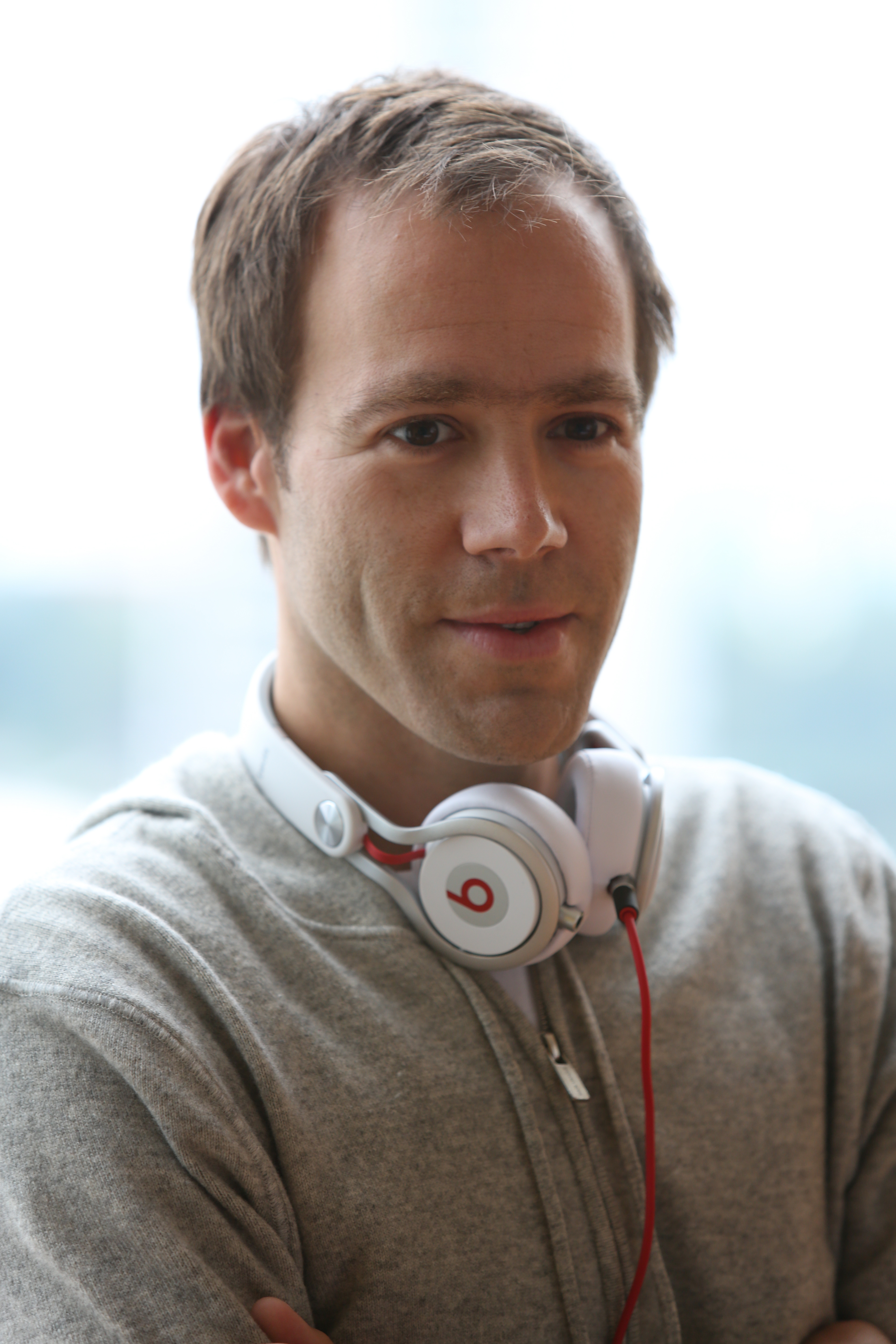
- Education: Wesleyan University (BA)
- Occupations: Music executive; musician
- Spouse: Sophia Nardin
- Children: 2
- Website: lukewood.com

Luke Wood is an American music executive and musician, known as being the president of both Beats Electronics from 2012 to 2020 and DGC Records from 2007 to 2010. He was also a guitarist for the 1990s alt-rock bands Sammy and Girls Against Boys.

== Early life and education ==
Luke grew up in Pittsford, a suburb of Rochester, New York, and graduated from Wilson Magnet High School in 1987.

He earned a Bachelor of Arts degree with a major in American Studies in 1991 from Wesleyan University and is a member of the university's board of trustees.

== Career ==
Prior to Beats Electronics, Wood was chief strategy officer of Interscope Geffen A&M and president of its rock imprint DGC Records. As DGC's president, Wood was responsible for all Artists & Repertoire (A&R) and marketing decisions and for developing and guiding the label's artists including Weezer, All-American Rejects, Rise Against, and Yeah Yeah Yeahs. Before working in A&R, Wood was involved in the firm's marketing and publicity.

In 1991, Wood served as a director of publicity for Geffen Records, where he represented bands including Nirvana and Sonic Youth. He later served as director of marketing for Geffen Records and as vice president of A&R at DreamWorks Records.

Wood joined Interscope Records in 2003 (during its merger with DreamWorks) as executive vice president of A&R, where he signed artists such as Brand New, Jimmy Eat World and Elliott Smith. He later became the President of DGC Records from 2007 to 2010.

In September 2014, Wood was added to Fender Guitar's board of directors.

=== Beats Electronics ===
Wood joined Beats Electronics in February 2011 as president and COO, working directly with Dr. Dre and Iovine on product development and overseeing day-to-day operations at the company. Wood was instrumental in Beats Electronics’ acquisition of subscription music service MOG in July 2012 which was later launched into Beats Music in January 2014. Under Luke Wood's leadership, in August 2014, Beats Electronics and Beats Music were acquired by Apple Inc. for $3 billion. In April 2020, Wood stepped down as president of Beats Electronics.

=== Music career ===
Wood was guitarist for Sammy, a 1990s alt-rock band that released three albums: Debut Album (1994) and Kings of the Island Empire (1995), released by Smells Like Records, and Tales of Great Neck Glory (1996), released by Geffen/DGC Records. He was also a guitarist for the band Girls Against Boys from 1990 to 1991, and would later sign them to Geffen Records as a label executive.

== Personal life ==
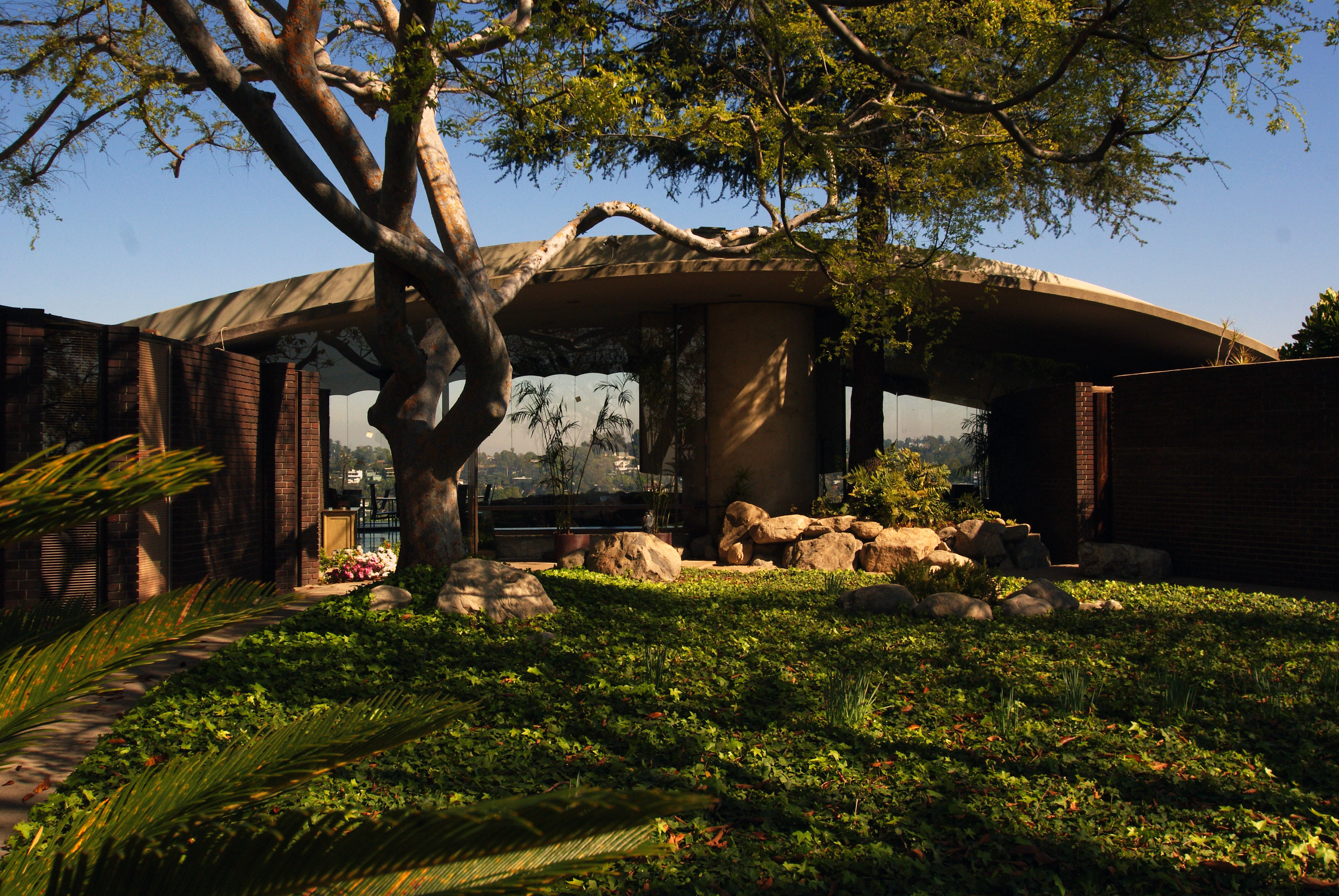
Silvertop in 2013

Wood is married to Sophia Nardin, a writer he met during his time at Wesleyan University. He lives in Los Angeles with his wife and two daughters.

In August 2014, shortly after Apple's acquisition of Beats for $3 billion, Wood purchased Silvertop, a 4,700-square-foot (440 m^{2}) residence in Los Angeles, for $8.55 million. The house was designed by architect John Lautner and built in 1956 for inventor Kenneth Reiner, who never occupied it as he eventually went bankrupt. The unfinished property was sold to a neighbouring couple in 1974, who made the house habitable and lived in it for forty years. When Wood acquired Silvertop, he commissioned architect Barbara Bestor, who had designed the Beats Electronics offices in LA, to renovate the property. The renovations were completed in 2018.
