= In an Expression of the Inexpressible =

Studio album by Blonde Redhead
- Released: September 8, 1998
- Recorded: February 1998
- Studios: Jolly Roger (Hoboken, New Jersey)
- Genres: Art rock; noise rock; post-punk
- Length: 42:48
- Label: Touch and Go
- Producers: Guy Picciotto; John Goodmanson

Blonde Redhead chronology
Fake Can Be Just as Good (1997)	In an Expression of the Inexpressible (1998)	Melody of Certain Damaged Lemons (2000)

In an Expression of the Inexpressible is the fourth studio album by American alternative rock band Blonde Redhead. It was released on September 8, 1998, by Touch and Go Records.

== Critical reception ==
Professional ratings
Review scores
Source	Rating
AllMusic	4/5 stars
Melody Maker	4/5 stars
NME	7/10
Pitchfork	5.5/10
Uncut	8/10

Reviewing In an Expression of the Inexpressible for NME in 1998, Kitty Empire praised Blonde Redhead's music as "a noble enterprise, fraught with detuned Sonic Youth guitars and scything hardcore fury." In Melody Maker, Neil Kulkarni called the album "funkless" yet "helluva lot more moving, thrilling and intriguing than anything the whole avant-rock/cod-funk axis has ever produced." AllMusic critic Matthew Hilburn attributed its "fuller and more polished" sound to Guy Picciotto and John Goodmanson's production and commented that Blonde Redhead has "never sounded quite as good", despite expressing mild reservations about the band's vocal and guitar performances. Nick Mirov of Pitchfork was less enthusiastic, writing that the band strives for "laid-back tension and moody sexiness" but instead sounds "lethargic and unengaging."

In 2018, In an Expression of the Inexpressible was listed as the 46th-best album of 1998 by Pitchfork. In an accompanying essay, Pitchfork writer Claire Lobenfeld noted the album's shift away from the grittier sound of earlier Blonde Redhead recordings, and toward "a more romantic and uncharacteristically lustrous version of the Sonic Youth mimesis of their first three albums."

== Track listing ==
All tracks are written by Blonde Redhead (Kazu Makino, Amedeo Pace and Simone Pace), except "Slogan" by Serge Gainsbourg. All lead vocals by Makino, except where noted.

No.	Title	Lead vocals	Length
1.	"Luv Machine"		3:39
2.	"10"	A. Pace	3:59
3.	"Distilled"	A. Pace	3:29
4.	"Missile ++"	Makino, A. Pace	3:13
5.	"Futurism vs. Passéism Part 2"	instrumental	4:04
6.	"Speed × Distance = Time"		3:54
7.	"In an Expression of the Inexpressible"		6:09
8.	"Suimasen" (すいません)	A. Pace	3:14
9.	"Led Zep"		5:15
10.	"This Is for Me and I Know Everyone Knows"	A. Pace	2:59
11.	"Justin Joyous"	instrumental	2:53
Total length:			42:48

2001 Japanese reissue bonus tracks
No.	Title	Lead vocals	Length
12.	"Slogan"	Makino, A. Pace	3:54
13.	"Limited Conversation"		3:49
Total length:			50:31

== Personnel ==
Credits are adapted from the album's liner notes.

Blonde Redhead

- Kazu Makino – guitar, vocals
- Amedeo Pace – guitar, vocals
- Simone Pace – drums, keyboards

Additional personnel

- John Goodmanson – production, recording
- Guy Picciotto – voice on "Futurism vs. Passéism Part 2", production
- Howie Weinberg – mastering
