= Misery Is a Butterfly =

Studio album by Blonde Redhead
- Released: March 15, 2004
- Recorded: March 16 – April 6, 2003
- Studios: Long View Farm (North Brookfield, Massachusetts)
- Genres: Art rock; chamber pop; dream pop; indie rock
- Length: 44:54
- Label: 4AD
- Producers: Guy Picciotto; Ryan Hadlock

Blonde Redhead chronology
Mélodie Citronique (2000)	Misery Is a Butterfly (2004)	The Secret Society of Butterflies (2005)

Singles from Misery Is a Butterfly
- 1. "Elephant Woman" Released: February 23, 2004; 2. "Equus" Released: May 24, 2004

Misery Is a Butterfly is the sixth studio album by American alternative rock band Blonde Redhead. The album was released on March 15, 2004, by 4AD. The album's lyrics and imagery reflect on a horseback accident Makino suffered in 2003, which required facial reconstructive surgery and months of rehabilitation, and caused her mental distress. The tracks "Elephant Woman" and "Equus" are more directly about the incident.

Continuing the sonic evolution that began with their previous album Melody of Certain Damaged Lemons, the album integrates lush string arrangements (viola, violin, cello) and clavichords, giving it a musical aesthetic that critics described as a cinematic, chamber-pop feel. The string arrangements were written and performed by Eyvind Kang and Jane Scarpantoni.

== Critical reception ==
Professional ratings
Aggregate scores
Source	Rating
Metacritic	78/100
Review scores
Source	Rating
AllMusic	4/5 stars
The Boston Phoenix	3/4 stars
Entertainment Weekly	B−
Mojo	4/5 stars
Now	4/5
Pitchfork	7.9/10
Q	3/5 stars
Rolling Stone	3/5 stars
Spin	B
Uncut	9/10

Misery is a Butterfly was well received by critics. Metacritic gave Misery is a Butterfly a score of 78/100, indicating generally favourable reviews. Pitchfork gave it a 4/5, saying: "Blonde Redhead have perfected their own unusual strain of perceived insincerity. They said it themselves, and it still rings true, [that] fake can be just as good." Rolling Stone gave the album a 3/5, saying "Blonde Redhead have been slogging away as part of the Sonic Youth-led downtown New York rock axis since the mid-Nineties. After five fair-to-middling albums, the band has suddenly emerged, Flaming Lips-style, with one of the better indie-rock records of the year: Misery Is a Butterfly." CMJ ranked Misery Is a Butterfly as the 18th best album of 2004.

== Track listing ==
All tracks are written by Blonde Redhead (Kazu Makino, Amedeo Pace and Simone Pace).

No.	Title	Lead vocals	Length
1.	"Elephant Woman"	Makino	4:49
2.	"Messenger"	A. Pace	3:21
3.	"Melody"	Makino	4:36
4.	"Doll Is Mine"	A. Pace	3:06
5.	"Misery Is a Butterfly"	Makino	5:07
6.	"Falling Man"	A. Pace	3:26
7.	"Anticipation"	Makino	4:04
8.	"Maddening Cloud"	A. Pace	3:20
9.	"Magic Mountain"	Makino	3:02
10.	"Pink Love"	A. Pace; Makino	6:13
11.	"Equus"	Makino	3:50
Total length:			44:54

== Personnel ==
Credits are adapted from the album's liner notes.

Blonde Redhead

- Kazu Makino – vocals, clavinet, guitar, programming, string arrangements
- Amedeo Pace – vocals, guitar, baritone guitar, programming, string arrangements
- Simone Pace – drums, percussion, electronics, programming, string arrangements

Additional musicians

- Eyvind Kang – viola, violin, string arrangements
- Jane Scarpantoni – cello
- Skúli Sverrisson – bass

Production

- Greg Calbi – mastering
- Chris Evans – engineering (assistant)
- Juan Garcia – engineering (assistant)
- John Goodmanson – mixing, additional engineering
- Ryan Hadlock – recording, additional production
- Guy Picciotto – production

Design

- Chris Bigg – artwork guidance
- Blonde Redhead – art direction, design
- Jun Koike – initial artwork assistance
- Carlo Mollino – front cover photography
- Keiko Uenishi – initial artwork assistance

== Charts ==
Chart (2004)	Peak position
French Albums (SNEP)	77
Italian Albums (FIMI)	50
UK Independent Albums (Official Charts)	41
US Billboard 200	180
US Heatseekers Albums (Billboard)	10
US Independent Albums (Billboard)	11
