= Kenneth Reiner =

American Industrialist, inventor

- Born: April 12, 1916; Brooklyn, US
- Died: September 12, 2011 (aged 95); Long Beach, California
- Education: B.E.E.
- Alma mater: Purdue University
- Occupations: Industrialist, Inventor, Philanthropist
- Notable work: Silvertop, Midtown School
- Spouses: Helen Katherine (m. 1940; div. 1971) Dorothy J Thomas (m. 1971–2011)
- Parents: David Reiner (father); Hermione Reiner (mother)
- Relatives: Rose Hartsworn (sister)

Kenneth Reiner (April 2, 1916 – September 12, 2011) was an American industrialist, philanthropist and inventor best known for constructing Silvertop, a landmark which is recognized one of the prominent architectural works of John Lautner. He also manufactured hair clips and Kaylock, a self-locking aircraft nut. After the World War II broke out, he invented spring steel Lady Ellen Klippies that subsequently captured 90% of market share. In 1974, he was charged with bankruptcy so the Silvertop project was not completed and later sold.

At an apparent age of 75, he used to take part in singing lessons and later he became a prominent benefactor of Musical Theatre West, a musical theatre of Long Beach. After completing singing lessons, he along with his wife used to hosted musical salons.

== Biography ==
He was born in Brooklyn, New York, US on April 2, 1916. He lived in Los Angeles by the latter. He received his initial schooling from the Brooklyn Ethical Culture School and graduated from the New York Boys High School in 1933. Later in 1937, he attended Purdue University where he obtained electrical engineering degree. He went to Los Angeles and was briefly employed at Lockheed Aircraft. He started Kaynar Corp in 1943, a corporation designed to manufacture bolts for the aerospace manufacturer industry.

He also invented heating and cooling systems of low velocity, ceiling lights and light-transmitting electrical skylights. He constructed Midtown School in Los Feliz, Los Angeles. To construct a facility for Kaynar, Reiner hired Jack Hilmer but this project along with the construction of his Silvertop home was turned over to John Lautner. The Silvertop project was designed as a research house for his family to test new materials and techniques. It was named in reference to its location atop the Moreno Highlands hillside overlooking Silver Lake Reservoir. During the construction, Reiner collaborated with Lautner for nearly ten years. The cost amounted to $1 million but it was never completed and he never moved into the house. In 2014, Luke Wood purchased the house for $8.55 million.

== Death ==
He died in Long Beach, California, on September 12, 2011, after a chronic condition.
