= Fake Can Be Just as Good =

Studio album by Blonde Redhead
- Released: March 11, 1997
- Recorded: October 1996
- Studio: John & Stu's (Seattle, Washington)
- Genre: Indie rock; post-punk
- Length: 36:45
- Label: Touch and Go
- Producer: John Goodmanson; Blonde Redhead

Blonde Redhead chronology
La Mia Vita Violenta (1995)	Fake Can Be Just as Good (1997)	In an Expression of the Inexpressible (1998)

Singles from Fake Can Be Just as Good
- 1. "Symphony of Treble" / "Kasuality" Released: January 21, 1997

Professional ratings
Review scores
Source	Rating
AllMusic	3.5/5 stars
NME	7/10

Fake Can Be Just as Good is the third studio album by American alternative rock band Blonde Redhead. It was released on March 11, 1997 by Touch and Go Records.

== Track listing ==
All tracks are written by Blonde Redhead (Kazu Makino, Amedeo Pace and Simone Pace).

No.	Title	Lead vocals	Length
1.	"Kazuality"	A. Pace	4:25
2.	"Symphony of Treble"	Makino	4:10
3.	"Water"	A. Pace	4:42
4.	"Ego Maniac Kid"	Makino	4:12
5.	"Bipolar"	Makino	5:02
6.	"Pier Paolo"	A. Pace	5:38
7.	"Oh James"	Makino, A. Pace	3:32
8.	"Futurism vs. Passéism"	instrumental	5:04
Total length:			36:45

Japanese edition bonus tracks
No.	Title	Length
9.	"Kazuality" (single version)	3:14
10.	"Symphony of Treble" (single version)	3:53
Total length:		43:52

== Personnel ==
Credits are adapted from the album's liner notes.

Blonde Redhead

- Kazu Makino – guitar, vocals
- Amedeo Pace – guitar, vocals
- Simone Pace – drums, keyboards

Additional musicians

- Vern Rumsey – bass

Production

- Blonde Redhead – production
- John Goodmanson – production, recording
- John Siket – mixing on "Bipolar" and "Oh James"
- Howie Weinberg – mastering
