= John Siket =

American record producer

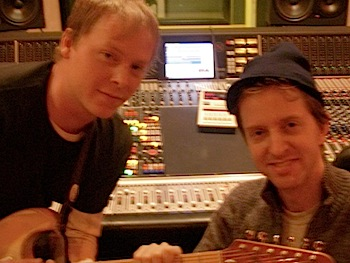
- John Siket (right) in the studio.

Background information
- Genres: Indie rock, noise rock, alternative rock, power pop
- Occupations: Record producer, mixing engineer, audio engineer
- Website: www.johnsiket.net

John Siket is a music producer, recording engineer, and mixer. He is best known for his work with Sonic Youth, Phish, Yo La Tengo, Dave Matthews Band, Blonde Redhead, Fountains of Wayne, Moe, Peter Murphy, Freedy Johnston, The Bottom Dollars and Ex Cops.

== Selected discography ==
| Year | Artist | Title | Label | Role |
|---|---|---|---|---|
| 2016 | The Hollows | Between the Water and the Wonder Wheel | Independent | Producer, Mixing |
| 2014 | The Bottom Dollars | Meet Me In Cognito | Independent | Producer, Mixing |
| 2014 | Peter Murphy | Lion | Nettwerk Records | Mixing |
| 2013 | Leroy Justice | Above the Weather | Independent | Mixing |
| 2013 | Andy Suzuki & The Method | Born Out of Mischief | Independent | Engineer |
| 2013 | Ex Cops | True Hallucinations | Other Music/Fat Possum | Producer, Engineer, Mixing |
| 2011 | Peter Murphy | Ninth | Nettwerk | Engineer, Mixing |
| 2009 | Trey Anastasio | Time Turns Elastic | Rubber Jungle | Engineer, Mixing |
| 2008 | Moe | Sticks and Stones | Fatboy Records | Producer, Engineer, Mixing |
| 2005 | Fountains of Wayne | Out-of-State Plates | Virgin | Engineer, Mixing |
| 2004 | Travis | Singles | Independiente, Epic | Engineer |
| 2003 | Pete Francis (of Dispatch) | Untold | Scrapper Records | Producer, Engineer, Mixing |
| 2002 | Railroad Earth | Bird in a House | Sugar Hill | Mixing |
| 2001 | Moe | Dither | Fatboy Records | Producer, Engineer, Mixing |
| 2001 | Strangefolk | Open Road | Independent | Engineer |
| 2001 | Freedy Johnston | Right Between the Promises | Elektra | Engineer, Mixing |
| 2000 | Phish | Farmhouse | Elektra | Engineer, Mixing |
| 2000 | Moe | L | Fatboy Records | Producer, Mixing |
| 2000 | M2M | Shades of Purple | Atlantic | Engineer |
| 2000 | Phish | The Siket Disc | Elektra | Producer, Engineer, Mixing |
| 1999 | Vertical Horizon | Everything You Want | RCA | Engineer |
| 1999 | Guster | Lost and Gone Forever | Aware | Mixing |
| 1999 | Paul Westerberg (of The Replacements) | Suicaine Gratifaction | Capitol | Engineer, Mixing |
| 1999 | Fountains of Wayne | Utopia Parkway | Atlantic | Engineer, Mixing |
| 1998 | Phish | The Story of the Ghost | Elektra | Engineer |
| 1998 | Moe | Tin Cans & Car Tires | 550 Music | Engineer |
| 1997 | The Replacements | All for Nothing/Nothing for All | Reprise | Mixing |
| 1997 | The Geraldine Fibbers | Butch | Virgin | Mixing |
| 1997 | Tindersticks | Curtains | This Way Up | Engineer, Mixing |
| 1997 | Blonde Redhead | Fake Can Be Just as Good | Touch and Go | Mixing |
| 1997 | Travis | Good Feeling | Independiente | Engineer |
| 1997 | Phish | Slip Stitch and Pass | Elektra | Mixing |
| 1996 | Phish | Billy Breathes | Elektra | Engineer, Mixing |
| 1996 | Triple Fast Action | Broadcaster | Independent | Engineer |
| 1996 | Dave Matthews Band | Crash | RCA | Engineer |
| 1995 | You Am I | Hi Fi Way | RooArt | Engineer |
| 1995 | Blonde Redhead | La Mia Vita Violenta | Smells Like Records | Mixing |
| 1995 | Blonde Redhead | Blonde Redhead | Smells Like Records | Mixing |
| 1995 | Soul Asylum | Let Your Dim Light Shine | Columbia | Engineer |
| 1995 | Thurston Moore | Psychic Hearts | Geffen | Engineer, Mixing |
| 1995 | Sonic Youth | Washing Machine | Geffen | Producer, Engineer, Mixing |
| 1994 | Cycomotogoat | Alkaline | Sector 2 Records | Producer, Engineer |
| 1994 | Helmet | Betty | Interscope | Engineer |
| 1994 | Sonic Youth | Experimental Jet Set, Trash and No Star | Geffen | Engineer |
| 1994 | Freedy Johnston | This Perfect World | Elektra | Engineer |
| 1993 | Yo La Tengo | Shaker | Matador | Engineer |
| 1993 | Cell | Slo*Blo | Geffen | Producer, Engineer |
| 1993 | Freedy Johnston | Unlucky | Bar/None | Engineer |
| 1993 | Deep Purple | The Battle Rages On... | Giant | Assistant Engineer |
| 1992 | Cycomotgoat | Cycomotogoat (EP) | De Es El Records | Producer, Engineer, Mastering |
| 1992 | Freedy Johnston | Can You Fly | Bar/None | Engineer |
| 1992 | Sonic Youth | Dirty | Geffen | Mixing Assistant |
| 1992 | Yo La Tengo | May I Sing with Me | Alias | Engineer, Mixing |
| 1990 | Yo La Tengo | Fakebook | Bar/None | Engineer |
| 1989 | The Replacements | Don't Tell a Soul | Sire | Mixing |
| 1986 | Yo La Tengo | Ride the Tiger | Coyote | Engineer |
