= Slo-Blo =

Studio album by Cell
- Released: 1992, Germany; 1993, United States
- Genre: Alternative rock
- Label: City Slang (Germany); Ecstatic Peace!/DGC
- Producer: John Siket, Cell

Cell chronology
| Slo-Blo (1992) | Living Room (1994) |

Slo-Blo (also stylized as Slo*Blo) is the debut album by the American band Cell. It was released in 1993 by DGC Records; the band had been signed by Thurston Moore. The album was first issued by City Slang, in 1992. The band supported the album with a North American tour.

== Production ==
The album was produced by John Siket and Cell. It had been recorded as a demo. The band concentrated on composing songs, rather than building on riffs. Cell used DGC's money to remix the album for its American release.

== Critical reception ==
Professional ratings
Review scores
| Source | Rating |
|---|---|
| AllMusic | 3/5 stars |
| Calgary Herald | A− |
| Chicago Tribune | 3/4 stars |
| Entertainment Weekly | C− |
| The Indianapolis Star | 2.5/4 stars |

Spin called the album "a leaden fumble, as close to formula as indie rock gets." The Chicago Tribune praised the "dynamic six-string melodic grunge, where magisterial riffs and probing guitar jams share equal time." Trouser Press opined that, "if commercial post-punk noise were to get more formulaic than this, it’d have to be stacked in the generic-brand aisle." The Washington Post thought that, "at its most tuneful, on such songs as 'Tundra', Slo+Blo recalled the plaintive, folkish punk of Husker Du."

Entertainment Weekly noted the "muffled drumming, proudly tuneless singing, sprawling arrangements that sound as if they’re about to crumble," writing that "the band forgot to write good songs, making Slo-Blo much noisy ado about nothing." Newsday concluded that, "on songs such as 'Cross the River' and 'Stratosphere', Cell's instrumentation gets very close to standard rock anthems." The Indianapolis Star wrote that "raging guitars here offer a satisfying jolt but [there's] little melodic diversity." The Calgary Herald called the album "hard, methodical, noisy."

AllMusic admired the "fluid, meandering riffs that slowly build and overlap and begin to take shape as something powerful, hypnotic, and cohesive."

== Track listing ==
| No. | Title | Length |
|---|---|---|
| 1. | "Fall" | 3:35 |
| 2. | "Wild" | 3:46 |
| 3. | "Cross the River" | 2:56 |
| 4. | "Dig Deep" | 3:27 |
| 5. | "Stratosphere" | 5:36 |
| 6. | "Two" | 2:59 |
| 7. | "Everything Turns" | 4:10 |
| 8. | "Tundra" | 4:10 |
| 9. | "Bad Day" | 2:24 |
| 10. | "Hills" | 4:09 |
