= Utopia Parkway =

Studio album by Fountains of Wayne
- Released: April 6, 1999
- Recorded: 1998
- Studio: Stratosphere Sound, New York City
- Genre: Alternative rock; power pop; pop punk
- Length: 45:35
- Label: Atlantic
- Producer: Adam Schlesinger; Chris Collingwood

Fountains of Wayne chronology
Fountains of Wayne (1996)	Utopia Parkway (1999)	Welcome Interstate Managers (2003)

Singles from Utopia Parkway
- 1. "Denise" Released: March 8, 1999; 2. "Red Dragon Tattoo" Released: May 1999; 3. "Troubled Times" Released: August 1999

Utopia Parkway is the second studio album by the American rock band Fountains of Wayne. It was released by Atlantic Records on April 6, 1999. The album peaked at number 23 on the US Heatseekers Albums chart. It is supported by three singles: "Denise", "Red Dragon Tattoo" and "Troubled Times".

== Background ==
The album was written by Chris Collingwood and Adam Schlesinger with the intention of emulating albums with a strong thematic story inspired by its surroundings, such as Muswell Hillbillies by The Kinks and Born to Run by Bruce Springsteen. According to Schlesinger, "When we were teenagers, we liked listening to Kinks records because we'd never been to England, and we got a sense of what it was like to live there. We really wanted to make a record that felt whole. We intentionally didn't include a few good songs because once we started picking up on the thematic connections, we wanted to stick with it." Collingwood added, "It had to do with reaching a level of maturity where you realize your own life is worth singing about. We spent so much time glamourizing bands like the Kinks, but what they were singing about was just everyday suburbia in England. There's this realization that you don't have to sing about Kensington for it to be worthwhile."

In terms of musical direction, the band opted to evoke songs and bands that had an ubiquitous nature when they were younger. According to Schlesinger, "Musically, the stuff on the record is like picking through all the songs that people our age weren't about to avoid growing up. It could be Loverboy, Steve Miller, the Cars, Journey. You don't even know if you like it or hate it; it just pops into your head. Sometimes when we're arranging a song we all remember something at the same time so we'll throw it in there. It's not even really conscious."

Collingwood's songwriting contributions on this album—including "Troubled Times", "A Fine Day for a Parade" and "Amity Gardens"—tended to be more serious than Schlesinger's. According to Collingwood, "I think I was a little panicky after the first record as being perceived as a novelty band. So I was trying to move away from making jokes on this record. That's why my contributions are more dismal."

This is also the first Fountains of Wayne album to feature guitarist Jody Porter and drummer Brian Young, who joined the band after Collingwood and Schlesinger had finished recording the debut album almost entirely on their own. According to Collingwood, "The new album was definitely recorded more like a band. We had been touring with them for over a year after making the first record, and it felt like second nature when we made the new record and it sounded the way the band sounds. The progression from the first record to the second was so gradual that I didn't really notice until I went back and listened to the first album and realized it really didn't sound like a band."

== Recording and production ==
The album was recorded at Stratosphere Sound in New York City, produced by Collingwood and Schlesinger. According to Young, the band went into the studio and "make a better record than the first." He also described the sound of the album as "more mature" with an "interesting vibe production wise." Collingwood said the goal was to make record "like the Beatles' White Album." Described as a "rock teen themed" album, some songs make cultural references, such as "Laser Show" making reference to Metallica or "Red Dragon Tattoo" making reference to Korn. Other songs such as "Troubled Times" and "Prom Theme" are about the "contemplations of youth's future," while tracks like "The Senator's Daughter" and "Lost in Space" are love songs. Speaking about the guitar solo on "Go, Hippie", Collingwood stated, "For us, doing something like that was just a funny thing to do, but the fact remains that neither Adam nor I could have done that.

== Cover ==
The album is named after a major street that connects the neighborhoods of Utopia and Beechhurst in the Queens borough of New York City, and its street sign is featured on the album cover. According to Schlesinger, "The name is so evocative. It ties in all these different places and characters because there's such a sense of longing about it."

== Release ==
The album's lead single "Denise" was released on March 8, 1999. The song performed moderately well on the Billboard charts, peaking at number 34 on the Alternative Airplay chart. "Red Dragon Tattoo" was released in May 1999, as the album's second single. "Troubled Times" was released in August 1999, as the album's third and final single. The band also released a six-track EP of the single in Japan. Each single contained B-sides, which Collingwood said, "There's a lot of pressure to put non-album tracks on the singles. I don't mind. It's a good opportunity to put out stuff that's embarrassing and painfully bad."

== Reception ==
Professional ratings
Review scores
Source	Rating
AllMusic	4/5 stars
Alternative Press	4/5
Entertainment Weekly	A
Melody Maker	4/5 stars
MSN Music (Expert Witness)	A−
NME	5/10
Pitchfork	5.1/10
Rolling Stone	3/5 stars
Spin	8/10
USA Today	3/4 stars

Utopia Parkway was named an "Album of the Week" by People in 1999 upon its release, but received mixed reviews from music press with some claiming the album showed the band "lacked depth" while others declared it a "masterpiece from the moment you first hear it".

Stephen Thomas Erlewine of AllMusic stated, "All the songs immediately make a connection and all of their melodic attributes simply strengthen with repeated listens." Entertainment Weekly gave the album an A grade rating, remarking, "If distance equals comedy, these guys aren't so far removed from their own youth that the narrative teen focus comes off as unduly ironic sociology. And Oasis would give up a week's worth of pints for any one of these pop hooks, though they'd never manage the humor or warmth." Ink19 called the album "one of the best CDs to come out of the '90s Brit-pop-esque revival." Sarah Zupko of PopMatters described the album as "sort of guilty pleasures" praising the music and lyrics. Russell Hall of Wall of Sound felt that the record was "slightly more sophisticated" than their debut album, stating, "With songs as impeccably crafted as these, why distract with anything other than tried-and-true rock and roll topics?." Edna Gundersen of USA Today said the band "may have paved a shortcut to fame with the madly melodic neo-pop on Utopia Parkway."

David Stubbs of NME wrote a mixed response for the album, feeling that it was "too clean, too neutral, too dry," and musically "they unfortunately convey the all-American blandness of which they sing, blending R.E.M., Nirvana, Simon & Garfunkel, The Eagles." Brent DiCrescenzo of Pitchfork also wrote a mixed review, calling the album "boring," but praised "Senior Prom" as the album's highlight. Writing for Lollipop Magazine, Jamie Kiffel said, "'Prom Theme' best exemplifies what is missing on this disc: as if these garage bandits were just a little too sentimental to really rip into The Sacred Prom, they skirt negativity but never really sit on it [...] Decide on pop, politics, or parody, and these emasculated posies might rose-rip real tattoos into some soft, college cuticles." Jonathan Cohen of Nude as the News felt "the lyrics are so alternately sincere or ironic, it's too easy to turn off the tongue-in-cheek numbers in search of something with a little more substance."

"Red Dragon Tattoo" was featured prominently throughout the Stephen King mini-series Kingdom Hospital. The 2008 Dar Williams album Promised Land includes a cover of "Troubled Times".

== Commercial performance ==
The album debuted and peaked at number 23 on the Billboard Heatseekers Albums chart. Dropped by Atlantic after sales failed to meet expectations, the band had a growing dispute with the company after it put no effort into promoting the album's single "Troubled Times". The album sold 67,000 copies by November 2003. As of April 2020, it sold 90,000 copies in the United States.

== Track listing ==
All tracks are written by Chris Collingwood and Adam Schlesinger.

Utopia Parkway – Standard Edition
No.	Title	Length
1.	"Utopia Parkway"	3:09
2.	"Red Dragon Tattoo"	3:32
3.	"Denise"	2:32
4.	"Hat and Feet"	3:03
5.	"The Valley of Malls"	3:23
6.	"Troubled Times"	3:39
7.	"Go, Hippie"	3:58
8.	"A Fine Day For a Parade"	4:13
9.	"Amity Gardens"	3:11
10.	"Laser Show"	2:24
11.	"Lost in Space"	2:19
12.	"Prom Theme"	3:09
13.	"It Must Be Summer"	3:19
14.	"The Senator's Daughter"	3:44
Total length:		45:35

Utopia Parkway – Japanese Edition
No.	Title	Length
15.	"I Know You Well"	3:26
Total length:		49:01

== Personnel ==
Credits adapted from the album's liner notes.

Fountains of Wayne

- Chris Collingwood – lead vocals, rhythm guitar, keyboards; production, photography
- Adam Schlesinger – bass guitar, guitars, keyboards, backing vocals; production, engineering, mixing
- Jody Porter – lead guitar, backing vocals
- Brian Young – drums, percussion

Additional musicians

- Ralph Farris – strings on "Prom Theme"
- Conway Kuo – strings on "Prom Theme"
- Ron Sexsmith – backing vocals on "A Fine Day for a Parade"
- Garo Yellin – strings on "Prom Theme"
- Kris Woolsey – handclaps on "Red Dragon Tattoo"

Technical personnel

- Joseph Cultice – photography
- Mike Denneen – mixing
- Gary Maurer – engineer
- Vladimir Meller – mastering
- Frank Olinsky – artwork
- John Siket – engineer

== Charts ==
Chart performance for Utopia Parkway
Chart (1999)	Peak position
Australian Albums (ARIA)	163
UK Albums (OCC)	115
US Heatseekers Albums (Billboard)	23

== Release history ==
Release dates and formats for Utopia Parkway
Region	Date	Format(s)	Label	Ref.
United States	April 6, 1999	CD	Atlantic	
Various	April 6, 1999	Digital download	Atlantic	
Japan	April 19, 1999	CD	Atlantic	
Europe	May 31, 1999	CD	Atlantic	
