= Tales of Great Neck Glory =

Studio album by Sammy
- Released: May 1996
- Label: DGC

Sammy chronology
| Leopard Skin Swatch EP (1996) | Tales of Great Neck Glory (1996) |

Tales of Great Neck Glory is an album by the American band Sammy, released in May 1996. The album was put out by DGC Records; band member Luke Wood was working for the company at the time. The first single was "Neptune Ave (Ortho Hi Rise)", released May 13, 1996.

Sammy broke up shortly after the album's release.

== Production ==
Sammy used three different drummers during the recording sessions for the album. Most of the songs are about nightlife in New York City.

== Critical reception ==
Professional ratings
Review scores
| Source | Rating |
|---|---|
| AllMusic | 3/5 stars |
| Robert Christgau | A− |
| The Encyclopedia of Popular Music | 3/5 stars |
| Fort Worth Star-Telegram | 2/4 stars |
| Waikato Times | 1.5/5 stars |

Robert Christgau wrote that "rather than hiding their privilege behind obscure witticisms, these alt-rock everyboys tell it like it is for their cultural class—bright, affluent kids who still have more options than they know what to do with." Trouser Press called the album "powerful and loads of fun," writing that "on atmospheric songs like 'Blue Oyster Bay' and the quiet 'Anything', the band expands its emotional range without leaving behind the art-damaged take on pop that makes its first album effective." The Evening Standard said that "Jesse Hartman's affecting, weary vocals give the outfit its panache."

The Waikato Times dismissed it as "not quite bad enough to become a cult classic, but not quite good enough to buy." Calling the band "posers," the Fort Worth Star-Telegram wrote that Sammy "sound like every other Geffen band out there, especially Sonic Youth and Weezer." The Arkansas Democrat-Gazette wrote: "Playing like Elastica's kid brothers and writing like graduate students bucking for an A, Sammy has style to burn."

AllMusic deemed it "a fun, if derivative, album," writing that Sammy "distills the half-mumbled, half-sung vocals, loopy guitars, off-kilter percussion, and sunny pop hooks that Pavement made their own in the late '80s." In a retrospective feature, Spin panned the album as a "cutout-bin regular."

== Track listing ==
| No. | Title | Length |
|---|---|---|
| 1. | "Possibly Peking" |
| 2. | "Encyclopedi-ite" |
| 3. | "Slim Style" |
| 4. | "Neptune Ave (Ortho Hi Rise)" |
| 5. | "Buckle-Up Sunshine" |
| 6. | "Blue Oyster Bay" |
| 7. | "Chilling Excerpts" |
| 8. | "Red Lights Flashing" |
| 9. | "Anything" |
| 10. | "Horse or Ballet?" |
| 11. | "Kings Pt. Vs. Steamboat" |

== Personnel ==
- Jesse Hartman – vocals, piano, guitar
- Luke Wood – bass, guitar, vocals
