= Hannah Cohen (singer) =

American singer and model

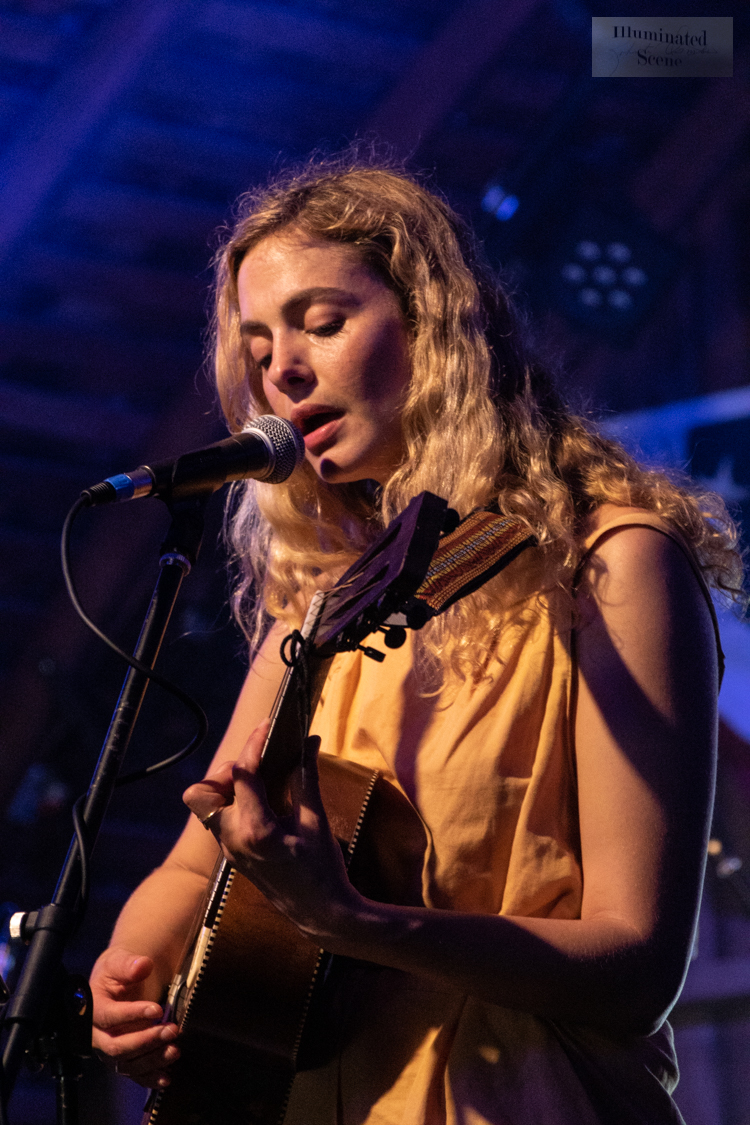

Background information
- Born: Hannah Cohen; October 25, 1986 (age 39); San Francisco, California
- Occupations: Singer, Songwriter

Hannah Cohen (born October 25, 1986) is an American singer and model. She has released four albums and toured internationally.

== Early life ==
Hannah Cohen was born in San Francisco and comes from a family of musicians and booksellers. Her grandfather, W. R. Rodgers, was a poet. Her father is the jazz drummer Myron Cohen.

Cohen left home as a teenager, soon finding herself in New York and becoming something of a muse to the city's art scene, posing for Richard Prince, Terry Richardson, David Salle, Will Cotton, and Ryan McGinley.

Cohen immersed herself in New York's music scene, working at the Village Vanguard.

== Career ==
Cohen's debut record, Child Bride, was produced by Thomas Bartlett, aka Doveman, known for his keyboard work with artists like The National and Antony and the Johnsons. Drawn from Cohen and Bartlett's mutual friends, the core band is a small group of New York musicians, including Sam Amidon, Rob Moose, Brad Albetta, Doug Wieselman and Kenny Wollesen. Their sessions were recorded by engineer Patrick Dillett. Child Bride was released by Bella Union on April 23, 2012. A second album, Pleasure Boy, was released March 2015. In 2017, she started work on her third album, Welcome Home, which was produced by Cohen’s partner Sam Owens (aka Sam Evian) and released in April 2019.

From 2020 to 2024, Cohen worked on her fourth album, eventually titled Earthstar Mountain. Recorded at Flying Cloud, a recording studio owned by Cohen and Owens, this album was released on March 28, 2025.

== Discography ==
- Child Bride (2012)
- Pleasure Boy (2015)
- Welcome Home (2019)
- Earthstar Mountain (2025)
