= 23 (Blonde Redhead album) =

Studio album by Blonde Redhead
- Released: April 10, 2007
- Recorded: 2006
- Studios: Magic Shop, New York City: Stay Gold, New York City
- Genres: Chamber pop; dream pop; shoegaze; art rock; indie rock; space rock
- Length: 43:23
- Label: 4AD
- Producer: Blonde Redhead

Blonde Redhead chronology
The Secret Society of Butterflies (2005)	23 (2007)	Penny Sparkle (2010)

Singles from 23
- 1. "23" Released: April 2, 2007; 2. "Silently" Released: May 28, 2007

23 is the seventh studio album by American alternative rock band Blonde Redhead. It released on April 10, 2007, by 4AD.

== Background ==
23 was self-produced by Blonde Redhead. The members of the band stated that while working on 23, they aimed to be more "spontaneous" in their songwriting; "for simplicity and clarity"; and to avoid overanalyzing their compositions. Drummer Simone Pace said that he found it "nerve-wracking" to begin recording the album with only loose ideas for songs. Mitchell Froom collaborated with Blonde Redhead for several days in the middle of the album's recording period, assisting the band on two tracks, "Silently" and "Top Ranking".

Lead vocalist Kazu Makino admitted that making 23 "wasn't an entirely enjoyable experience", adding: "Without a producer, a referee, we could really get on each other's cases. It got intense." Guitarist Amedeo Pace stated that the band was unsure of the album's direction until the mixing stage.

Artist Alex Gross designed the album's cover art.

== Release ==
23 was released by the label 4AD on April 10, 2007, in the United States. It debuted at number 63 on the American Billboard 200 albums chart, selling roughly 11,000 copies in its first week of release. In the United Kingdom, the album was released on April 16, 2007.

The track "23" was released on April 2, 2007, as a one-track 7-inch vinyl single. "Silently" was released on May 28, 2007, as a digital EP featuring the additional tracks "(We Are a Real Team) Harry and I" and "Signs Along the Path", and as a 7-inch vinyl single featuring an alternate version of "(We Are a Real Team) Harry and I" on the B-side.

Melodie McDaniel directed the first official music video for "23". Mike Mills directed music videos for five of the album's tracks: "23", "My Impure Hair", "Silently", "The Dress" and "Top Ranking". The "Top Ranking" video stars actress Miranda July.

== Critical reception ==
Professional ratings
Aggregate scores
Source	Rating
Metacritic	83/100
Review scores
Source	Rating
AllMusic	4.5/5 stars
The A.V. Club	A−
Entertainment Weekly	A−
The Guardian	3/5 stars
Mojo	4/5 stars
Pitchfork	7.0/10
Q	3/5 stars
Spin	2.5/5 stars
Uncut	8/10
Urb	4.5/5 stars

23 was met with critical acclaim. At Metacritic, which assigns a normalized rating out of 100 to reviews from professional critics, the album received an average score of 83, based on 30 reviews. Heather Phares of AllMusic noted that on 23, Blonde Redhead "trades the cloistered chamber rock" of their previous album Misery Is a Butterfly (2004) "for tone-bending dream pop and subtle electronics". She found that "while the wide open spaces sound a little bare at first, this streamlined approach ends up making this Blonde Redhead's loveliest and most accessible work yet." The A.V. Club's Michaelangelo Matos said that the band's stylistic shift toward a "softer" sound "fits them exceptionally well." Entertainment Weekly critic Simon Vozick-Levinson praised 23 as "an enthralling listen, proving once and for all that they deserve the wide success of fellow travelers like Radiohead and Sonic Youth."

Pitchfork's D. Shawn Bosler was more reserved in his praise, finding the songs on 23 to be "well-written" but overproduced. Dave Simpson of The Guardian felt that the album is marred by "muddy, unfocused production", despite having "more than most seventh albums' share of otherworldly pop delights." Joe Gross of Spin stated that the band lapses into "overheated ambience", and was particularly critical of Amedeo Pace's "wailing, overemotive" vocals.

At the end of 2007, American webzine Somewherecold listed 23 as one of the year's best albums. In 2016, Pitchfork ranked 23 as the 30th best shoegaze album of all time.

== Track listing ==
All tracks are written by Blonde Redhead (Kazu Makino, Amedeo Pace and Simone Pace). All lead vocals are by Makino, except where noted.

No.	Title	Length
1.	"23"	5:18
2.	"Dr. Strangeluv"	4:47
3.	"The Dress"	4:00
4.	"SW" (lead vocals: A. Pace)	4:35
5.	"Spring and by Summer Fall" (lead vocals: A. Pace)	4:15
6.	"Silently"	3:57
7.	"Publisher" (lead vocals: A. Pace, Makino)	4:01
8.	"Heroine"	4:11
9.	"Top Ranking"	3:27
10.	"My Impure Hair"	4:52
Total length:		43:23

iTunes Store edition bonus track
No.	Title	Length
11.	"(We Are a Real Team) Harry and I"	8:03
Total length:		51:26

Japanese edition bonus tracks
No.	Title	Length
11.	"Signs Along the Path"	3:45
12.	"(We Are a Real Team) Harry and I"	8:03
Total length:		55:11

== Personnel ==
Credits are adapted from the album's liner notes.

Blonde Redhead

- Kazu Makino
- Amedeo Pace
- Simone Pace

Additional musicians

- Chris Coady – robot voice on "Heroine"
- Morgan King – French horn on "SW"
- Skúli Sverrisson – bass

Production

- Blonde Redhead – production
- Greg Calbi – mastering
- Chris Coady – recording
- Rich Costey – mixing
- Mitchell Froom – assistance on "Silently" and "Top Ranking"
- Eddie Jackson – engineering, editing
- Alan Moulder – mixing
- Andy Savours – engineering
- Brian Thorn – engineering
- Ted Young – engineering

Design

- Alexander Gelman – creative direction
- Alex Gross – artwork
- David Heasty – art direction

== Charts ==
Chart (2007)	Peak position
Belgian Albums (Ultratop Flanders)	52
Belgian Alternative Albums (Ultratop Flanders)	31
French Albums (SNEP)	77
Italian Albums (FIMI)	38
Japanese Albums (Oricon)	196
Swiss Albums (Schweizer Hitparade)	100
UK Albums (Official Charts)	152
UK Independent Albums (Official Charts)	13
US Billboard 200	63
US Independent Albums (Billboard)	4
US Top Rock Albums (Billboard)	20
