= Nocturnes, Op. 55 (Chopin) =

Two piano compositions by Frédéric Chopin

The Nocturnes, Op. 55 are a set of two nocturnes for solo piano written by Frédéric Chopin. They are his fifteenth and sixteenth installations in the genre, and were composed between 1842 and 1844, and published in August 1844. Chopin dedicated them to his pupil and admirer Mademoiselle Jane Stirling.

== Pieces ==
=== No. 1 in F minor ===
Nocturne in F minor, Op. 55, No. 1

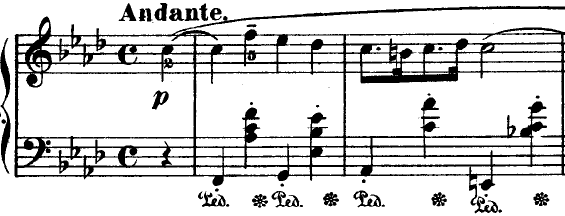

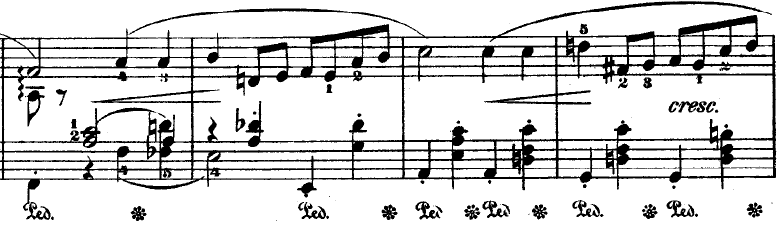
The opening bars from Op. 55, No. 1 in F minor above, and the second theme below.

Composed in 1842–44, the F minor nocturne has an average duration of about 5 minutes.

The piece is in ternary form (ABA). Its main theme has a slow 4/4 with a heavy, steady crotchet beat. It starts with the main theme which repeats once with only minor variations. The right hand plays a slow melody and the left hand accompanies with a bass note and then a chord, in crotchets. The second section is then played with, again, the right hand playing the melody and the left hand accompanying with bass notes and a chord. Although there are occasional changes to this pattern, for example the left hand plays a sustained minim with a crotchet chord above. The main theme then comes back in with some variations to the first two times it was played: a triplet phrase is added to the third bar of the section. The second section is again repeated with no variations, followed immediately by the first section again with the triplet sequence.

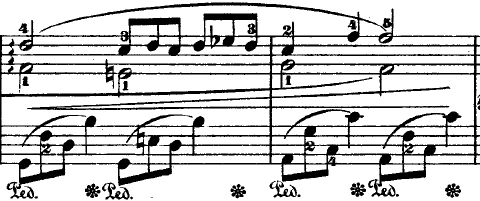
An excerpt from the middle section.

A tempo change to più mosso speeds up the piece. It starts off with some fast, triplet quavers and then three loud (forte) chords. This then repeats three further times until a completely new section comes in with a melody in the right hand and triplet broken chords in the left (see score on left). A descending scale and some large chords completes this section and leads it onto the first theme again.

There is then a large variation on the first theme where the main tune is played with other notes in between. There is then a large section of arpeggios and finishing off on six final chords, then modulates to the parallel key of F major for an interrupted final cadence.

There are two short chorales. The first, at bars 71–72, marks the transition from B section back to A, while the second, at 98–101, concludes the piece, in F major.

Frederick Niecks, Chopin's biographer, said of the piece: "we will note only the flebile [feeble] dolcezza of the first and the last section, and the inferiority of the more impassioned middle section".

This piece was performed by Vladimir Horowitz in his television debut concert at Carnegie Hall in 1968, which was broadcast nationwide by CBS.

=== No. 2 in E♭ major ===
Nocturne in E♭ major, Op. 55, No. 2

The second nocturne in E♭ major features a 12/8 time signature, triplet quavers in the bass, and a lento sostenuto tempo marking. The left-hand features sweeping legato arpeggios from the bass to the tenor, while the right-hand often plays a contrapuntal duet and a soaring single melody. There is a considerable amount of ornamentation in the right hand, for instance the prolonged trills in measures 34 and 52–54. The characteristic chromatic ornaments, in measures 7, 25, 36, and 50, often subdivide the beats in a syncopated fashion in contrast with the steady triplets in the left hand.

Of this nocturne, Niecks wrote:

The second nocturne (in E flat major) differs in form from the other nocturnes in...that it has no contrasting second section, the melody flowing onward from beginning to end in a uniform manner. The monotony of the unrelieved sentimentality does not fail to make itself felt. One is seized by an ever-increasing longing to get out of this oppressive atmosphere, to feel the fresh breezes and warm sunshine, to see smiling faces and the many-coloured dress of Nature, to hear the rustling of leaves, the murmuring of streams, and voices which have not yet lost the clear, sonorous ring that joy in the present and hope in the future impart.

== In theatre ==
The second and third duets of the ballet In the Night by Jerome Robbins (1970) were choreographed to this music.

== In popular culture ==
- The F minor nocturne is featured in the 1997 action thriller The Peacemaker (starring George Clooney and Nicole Kidman), where the main terrorist character (Marcel Iureş as Dusan Gavrich), being a music teacher, explains to a young girl how to properly 'feel' and interpret the nuances in the music, and then plays it for her on the piano.
- The songs "For the Damaged" and "For the Damaged Coda" by Blonde Redhead are based on the F minor nocturne, and the latter appears in the animated series Rick and Morty.
- The Witcher 2: Assassins of Kings Hope trailer has Nocturnes, Op. 55 playing in the background.
- Cyberpunk 2077 features a segment titled 'Nocturne Op55N1' as its transition into its third act. When the player character meets with their contact, Hanako Arasaka, she is performing the song on a piano.
- "Interview With the Vampire" Season 1 Episode 3 features the nocturne during the ending scene in the bayou.
- In Jeeves and Wooster Season 3 Episode 6, Madeline plays Nocturnes, Op. 55, No. 1 in F Minor while chatting with Bertie in the library.

== Sources ==
- David Heyer pp51–71 "An Analysis of the Chorales in Three Chopin Nocturnes: Op. 32, No.2; Op. 55, No.1; and the Nocturne in C# Minor (without opus number)". Masters thesis, University of Oregon, 2008–03.
