= Cell (American band) =

American rock band (1990–1995)

- Cell, 1994.

Background information
- Origin: New York City, New York, USA
- Genres: Alternative rock Grunge; Post-grunge; Indie rock
- Years active: 1990–1995
- Labels: City Slang, Ecstatic Peace!, DGC Records
- Members: Ian James; Jerry DiRienzo; David Motamed; Keith Nealy
- Past members: Renee Conte

Cell were a New York–based rock band. They were often labeled as a grunge band due to the time frame of their existence, though they could be considered college rock or alternative rock. The band formed in 1990 and disbanded in 1995. Championed by Sonic Youth's Thurston Moore, they released a 7-inch on his Ecstatic Peace! label. This single listed 'Letha' on bass (likely Letha Rodman from the New York City band Ruby Falls) and contained the song "Stratosphere" later rerecorded for their debut once signed to Geffen subsidiary DGC Records.

== Members ==
- Ian James - guitars, vocals
- Jerry DiRienzo - guitars, vocals
- David Motamed - bass
- Keith Nealy - drums

== Selected Discography ==
=== Never Too High single (1991) ===
1. "Never Too High"
2. "Stratosphere"

=== Slo-Blo (1992) ===
1. "Fall" (3:34)
2. "Wild" (3:46)
3. "Cross the River" (2:56)
4. "Dig Deep" (3:29)
5. "Stratosphere" (5:35)
6. "Two" (2:58)
7. "Everything Turns" (4:11)
8. "Tundra" (3:06)
9. "Bad Day" (2:24)
10. "Hills" (4:08)

=== Fall single (1992) ===
1. "Fall"
2. "Circles" (The Who cover)
3. "Auf Wiedersehen" (Cheap Trick cover)

=== Cross the River single (1993) ===
1. "Cross the River"
2. "China Latina"
3. "So Cool"
4. "Free Money" (Patti Smith cover)

=== Milky single (1993) ===
1. "Milky"
2. "Two Weeks June"
3. "Deranged"

=== Living Room (1994) ===
1. "Milky" (3:22)
2. "China Latina" (3:36)
3. "Sad & Beautiful" (4:04)
4. "Goodbye" (3:38)
5. "Chained" (3:18)
6. "So Cool" (LP-Only)
7. "Come Around" (3:32)
8. "Living Room" (4:42)
9. "Fly" (4:05)
10. "Halo" (3:04)
11. "Soft Ground" (4:44)
12. "Camera" (4:08)
13. "Blue Star" (6:22)
