= Sam Evian =

American singer-songwriter

- Born: Sam Griffin Owens
- Origin: Brooklyn, New York
- Genres: Indie rock; psych pop
- Years active: 2016–present
- Labels: Saddle Creek; Fat Possum
- Website: www.samevian.com

Sam Griffin Owens, known professionally as Sam Evian, is an American songwriter, instrumentalist and producer based in New York. He has released four full-length albums.

== History ==
In 2016, Sam Evian signed with Saddle Creek Records. Sam Evian's music has been described as indie rock, "crunchy country", and "70s-tinged psychedelic soft rock". He released his debut album Premium in 2016. The album's lead single, "I Need a Man", was premiered by Stereogum.

In 2018, Evian released his second album You, Forever. Kazu Makino of Blonde Redhead contributed to the album's song "Next to You". The song "Health Machine" was released as a single and music video. Another single, titled "IDGAF", was premiered by Stereogum. In the Pitchfork review of You, Forever, Allison Hussey wrote that Evian "offers rock songs about vulnerability and desire that are gentle and sweet but avoid the most saccharine tendencies of soft rock". Digital Trends included You, Forever in their list of the best albums of 2018.

In 2021 it was announced that Evian had been signed to Fat Possum Records and that his new album Time to Melt would be released on October 29, 2021. Of the album, Aquarium Drunkard said, "Time to Melt aspires to address the strife of the present and sound good while cooking dinner. No short order, but with its lush sounds and warm nods in the direction of Sly and the Family Stone, T. Rex, and Shuggie Otis, he’s pulled it off." Flood Magazine said, "Time to Melt spins death in a funky, positive light."

His fourth album, Plunge, was released on March 22, 2024. It was recorded in early 2023 at his studio Flying Cloud Recording in the Catskills, New York.

== Discography ==
=== Albums ===
Title	Album details
Premium	Released: September 30, 2016; Formats: LP, CD, digital download, streaming; Label: Saddle Creek
You, Forever	Released: June 1, 2018; Formats: LP, CD, digital download, streaming; Label: Saddle Creek
Time to Melt	Released: October 29, 2021; Formats: LP, CD, digital download, streaming; Label: Fat Possum
Plunge	Released: March 22, 2024; Formats: LP, CD, digital download, streaming; Label: Flying Cloud

=== Singles ===
- "Sleep Easy" / "You Have to Hydrate" (2016)
- "Easy to Love" (2021)
- "Knock Knock" (2021)
- "Time to Melt" (2021)
- "Never Know" (2021)
- "Life Go Low" (2023)
- "Wisteria" (2023)

=== Production discography ===
- Johanna Samuels – Excelsior (producer, engineer, mixing, performer)
- Widowspeak – Plum (producer, engineer, mixing, performer)
- Anna Burch – If You're Dreaming (producer, engineer, mixing, performer)
- Molly Sarlé – Karaoke Angel (producer, engineer, mixing, performer)
- Hannah Cohen – Welcome Home (producer, engineer, mixing, performer)
- Kazu – Adult Baby (producer, engineer, mixing, performer)
- Cass McCombs – Tip of the Sphere (engineer, performer)
- Lina Tullgren – Free Cell (engineer)
- Wilder Maker – Zion (engineer)
- Cass McCombs – I'm a Shoe (Mangy Love) (producer, engineer)
- Okkervil River – In the Rainbow Rain (engineer)
- Okkervil River – New Blood/Skip Tracer (engineer, mixing)
- Sam Amidon – Juma Mountain and April (engineer)
- Blonde Redhead – Golden Light (engineer for string recordings)
- Cassandra Jenkins – Play Til You Win (engineer, producer, mixing, performer)
- Buck Meek – Heart Was Beat (engineer, mixing)
- Sam Evian – Premium (producer, engineer, mixing, performer, composer)
- Sam Evian – You, Forever (producer, engineer, mixing, performer, composer)
- Sam Evian – Need You EP (mixing, performer, composer)
- Sam Evian – Time to Melt (producer, performer, composer)
- Big Thief – Dragon New Warm Mountain I Believe in You (engineer, mixing, additional production)
- Kate Bollinger – Songs From A Thousand Frames Of Mind (producer, engineer, performer, composer)
