= Barragán (album) =

Studio album by Blonde Redhead
- Released: September 2, 2014
- Studio: Key Club, Benton Harbor, Michigan; Magic Shop, New York City
- Genre: Alternative rock; art rock; dream pop; shoegaze
- Length: 41:45
- Label: Kobalt
- Producer: Drew Brown

Blonde Redhead chronology
Penny Sparkle (2010)	Barragán (2014)	Freedom of Expression on Barragán (2016)

Singles from Barragán
- 1. "No More Honey" Released: June 10, 2014; 2. "Dripping" Released: July 8, 2014

Barragán is the ninth studio album by American alternative rock band Blonde Redhead. It was released on September 2, 2014 by Kobalt Label Services. The album was produced, engineered and mixed by Drew Brown, and was recorded at Key Club Recording in Benton Harbor, Michigan and the Magic Shop in New York City.

Prior to its official release, Barragán was made available to stream online on August 24, 2014.

== Critical reception ==
Professional ratings
Aggregate scores
Source	Rating
AnyDecentMusic?	6.5/10
Metacritic	64/100
Review scores
Source	Rating
AllMusic	4/5 stars
Alternative Press	3/5 stars
The A.V. Club	C+
Exclaim!	8/10
NME	8/10
Pitchfork	4.3/10
PopMatters	4/10
Q	4/5 stars
Rolling Stone	3.5/5 stars
Uncut	7/10

At Metacritic, which assigns a weighted average score out of 100 to reviews from mainstream critics, Barragán received a score of 64 out of 100 based on 18 reviews, indicating "generally favorable reviews".

Barragán's light, almost minimalistic sound compared to previous Blonde Redhead albums was received with mixed feelings. Exclaim! reviewer Cam Lindsay summarized that "Barragán is not an album determined to grab you in one listen; it's a 'grower,' as they say, but once it grows, it's apparent there's no shortage of baroque delights to discover on this veteran band's ninth album." PopMatters' Zachary Houle was more critical, arguing that the music "lacks any kind of clarity in direction", and that fans might be alienated by "a band that is reinventing itself for the sake of reinvention."

== Track listing ==
All tracks are written by Blonde Redhead (Kazu Makino, Amedeo Pace and Simone Pace).

No.	Title	Length
1.	"Barragán"	2:13
2.	"Lady M"	2:59
3.	"Dripping"	3:40
4.	"Cat on Tin Roof"	3:37
5.	"The One I Love"	3:51
6.	"No More Honey"	3:42
7.	"Mind to Be Had"	8:46
8.	"Defeatist Anthem (Harry and I)"	6:14
9.	"Penultimo"	3:18
10.	"Seven Two"	3:25
Total length:		41:45

== Personnel ==
Credits are adapted from the album's liner notes.

Blonde Redhead

- Kazu Makino – vocals (lead on 2, 4–6, 8–10), Chamberlin and Mellotron keyboards, harpsichord, organ, piano, synthesizer
- Amedeo Pace – vocals (lead on 3, 7, 9, 10), acoustic guitar, baritone guitar, electric guitar, bass, Chamberlin and Mellotron keyboards, harpsichord, organ, piano, synthesizer
- Simone Pace – drums, percussion, drum programming, organ, piano, synthesizer

Additional musicians

- Drew Brown – Chamberlin keyboard, synthesizer, drum programming, Max/MSP, field recordings
- Jason Falkner – bass, electric guitar
- David Garza – bass, electric guitar, organ
- Mauro Refosco – percussion, mallets
- J. Williams – synthesizer

Production

- Drew Brown – production, engineering, mixing
- Jason Chang – engineering (assistant)
- Sean Gavigan – engineering (assistant)
- Kabir Hermon – engineering
- John Horne – engineering (assistant)
- David Ives – engineering, mastering
- Lex – software design
- Jessica Ruffins – engineering
- Bill Skibbe – engineering

Design

- Claude Cahun – cover photography
- Tim Flach – photography
- Lucie Kim – artwork
- Kazu Makino – artwork

== Charts ==
Chart (2014)	Peak position
Belgian Albums (Ultratop Flanders)	68
Belgian Albums (Ultratop Wallonia)	86
French Albums (SNEP)	104
UK Independent Album Breakers (OCC)	17
US Billboard 200	180
US Independent Albums (Billboard)	29
US Top Rock Albums (Billboard)	48
