= Blonde Redhead =

American alternative rock band

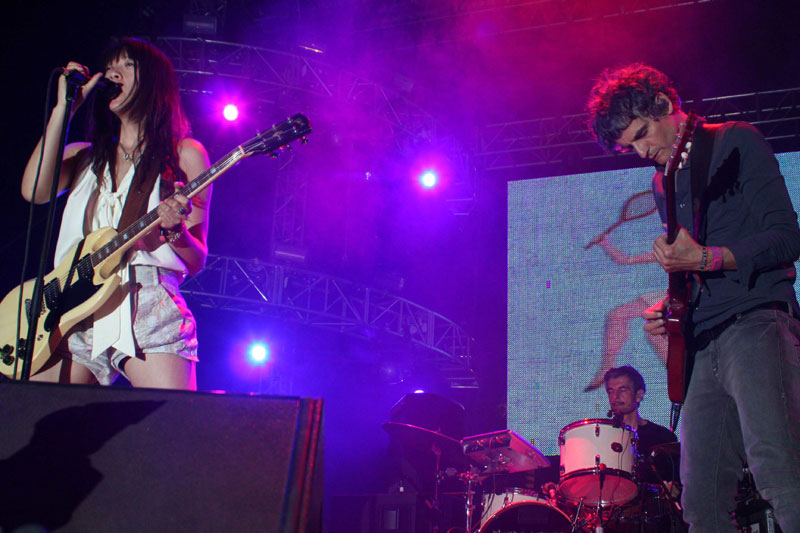
- Blonde Redhead performing at the Coachella Valley Music and Arts Festival in Indio, California, United States L-R: Kazu Makino, Simone N. Pace, Amedeo F. Pace

Background information
- Origin: New York City, U.S.
- Genres: Alternative rock; shoegaze; dream pop; indie rock; noise rock
- Years active: 1993–present
- Labels: Oxo; Smells Like; Rough Trade; Touch & Go; 4AD; Beggars Banquet; Kobalt; Ponderosa; Asa Wa Kuru; section 1
- Members: Kazu Makino; Amedeo Pace; Simone Pace
- Past members: Maki Takahashi; Toko Yasuda
- Website: www.blonde-redhead.com

Blonde Redhead is an American alternative rock band composed of Kazu Makino (vocals, keyboards, rhythm guitar) and identical twin brothers Simone Pace (drums, keyboards) and Amedeo Pace (lead guitar, bass, keyboards, vocals) that formed in New York City in 1993. The band's earliest albums were noted for their noise rock influences, though their sound evolved by the early 2000s with the releases of Misery is a Butterfly (2004) and 23 (2007), which both incorporated elements of dream pop, shoegaze and other genres. They have released ten studio albums and have toured internationally.

== Career ==
Amedeo and Simone Pace were born in Milan, Italy. They moved to Montreal at the age of 13 and later relocated to Boston to study music. After earning Bachelor's degrees, they entered the New York City underground music scene. Blonde Redhead formed in New York in 1993 after Amedeo and Simone met Kazu Makino, a film student at the time, through mutual friends. John Lurie wrote in his memoir that he had met the twins on Elba and encouraged Makino, a longtime friend, to start a band with them. The band named themselves after a song on the 1981 EP A Taste of DNA by the no wave group DNA. For the group's first decade, Amedeo and Makino were romantically involved.

Blonde Redhead's self-titled debut album was released in 1995. Shortly afterwards, fourth member Maki Takahashi left the band and was replaced by her friend Toko Yasuda as bassist. Yasuda played on the band's second album La Mia Vita Violenta also released in 1995. Both records appeared on the New York label Smells Like. The band continued as a trio.

Their third album, Fake Can Be Just as Good, was released through Touch & Go in 1997. The band enlisted the help of Vern Rumsey of Unwound, who filled the role of guest bassist, while the subsequent albums have featured the Icelandic musician Skúli Sverrisson.

On their fourth album, In an Expression of the Inexpressible, Guy Picciotto of Fugazi was hired as producer. Picciotto also contributed in the construction to the song "Futurism vs. Passéism Part 2" as well as lending it his vocals to the 1998 release. In 2000 Picciotto also co-produced Melody of Certain Damaged Lemons with Ryan Hadlock, an album about the relationship between Makino and Amedeo Pace. The four-year delay between Melody of Certain Damaged Lemons and Misery Is a Butterfly is attributed to Makino's recovery time after being trampled by a horse. Much of the visual and lyrical imagery of Misery Is a Butterfly is reflective of the accident, especially in the music video for "Equus." It was the last time Picciotto produced the band.

In 2006 Makino recorded vocals for the film Sisters. Alan Moulder mixed the trio's album 23 which was released on 4AD, in April 2007.

They scored Keven McAlester's 2008 documentary The Dungeon Masters. Its main theme, "Il Padroni", was released in February 2010, ahead of the film's release on February 12.

In March 2010 the band included a demo version of the song "Not Getting There" on a 4AD sampler entitled Fragments From Work In Progress. Their eighth album, Penny Sparkle, was released in September 2010 through 4AD. The album was again mixed by Alan Moulder, and reached 79 in the Billboard 200 chart. For the subsequent tour the band added a key-board player. The band released a six-track remix EP in July 2011.

In April 2014 their song "For the Damaged Coda" was used in an episode of the first season of the cartoon Rick and Morty. The use of this song was again repeated in April 2017 in the third season. The use of the song became an important plot device regarding the character "Evil Morty" for the series. Around 2018 this song became an Internet meme expressing the sadness one feels at the worst moments of one's life.

A year later, the band started the project for their next album, Barragán, but without the support of 4AD. Self-financed, the band embarked on a haphazard recording schedule with producer Drew Brown. Simone Pace noted that Brown had steered them towards vintage instrumentation and equipment, adding that that was the reason the album sounded sparser and more minimal. It was released on September 2, 2014, through Kobalt. It was preceded by the single "No More Honey" that appeared in June. It was followed by the second single, "Dripping," which included a video. The band also provided the soundtrack to the Danish film The Commentator.

In June 2016 it was announced that the band would release the box set Masculin Féminin on September 30 through The Numero Group. It contains 37 tracks, which cover the first two albums, associated singles, radio sessions and unreleased demos from the period. In 2017, the band released the EP 3 O'Clock, which comprises four songs and featured contributions from Eyvind Kang, Michael Leonhart, Sam Owens and Mauro Refosco, among others.

In September 2019, Kazu Makino released her first solo album, Adult Baby, which featured Ryuichi Sakamoto (on piano, field recordings, and "organic instruments"), Ian Chang and Greg Saunier (drums), and Mauro Refosco (percussion).

The band toured the US in 2022 on select dates supporting Tool. The following year, the band announced the release of their tenth album, Sit Down for Dinner, on September 29, 2023, through section1. In November, they released a reworked version of "Damaged Coda" entitled "More Coda" for Rick and Morty. On June 14, 2024, Blonde Redhead performed at the Forum Melbourne in Melbourne, appearing as part of the 2024 RISING: festival, supported by Melbourne-based singer, Georgia Knight.

== Members ==
Current members

- Kazu Makino – vocals, rhythm guitar, keyboards, bass (1993–present)
- Amedeo Pace – lead guitar, vocals, bass, keyboards (1993–present)
- Simone Pace – drums, keyboards (1993–present)

Former members

- Maki Takahashi – bass (1993–1995)
- Toko Yasuda – bass (1995–1996)

Timeline

== Gallery ==
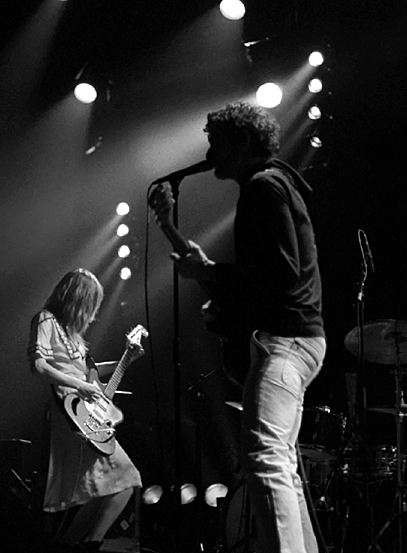
Blonde Redhead live at Le Botanique in Brussels, Belgium (2006)

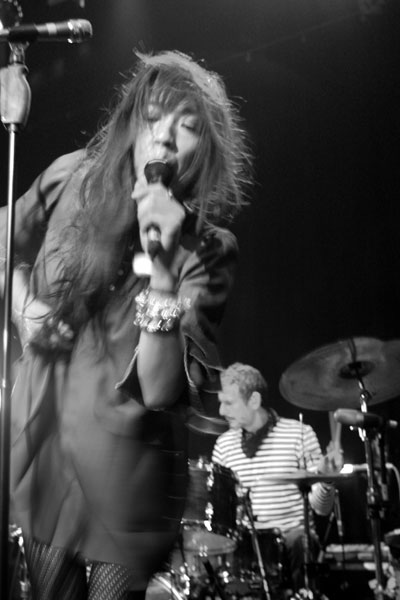
Kazu Makino, Simone Pace - performing live at Gebäude 9 in Cologne, Germany (June 2007)

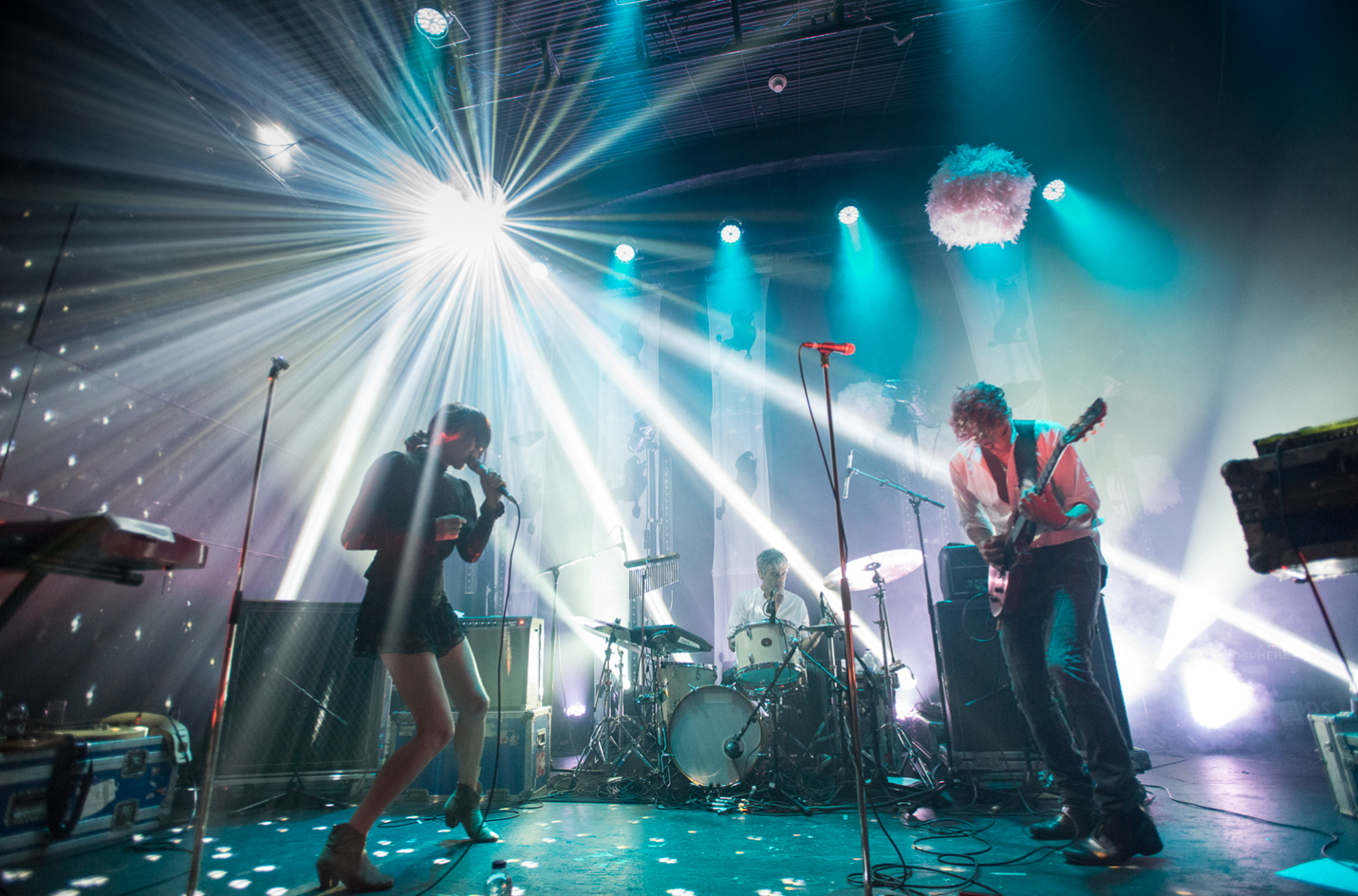
Blonde Redhead performing at Agora des arts in Rouyn-Noranda, Quebec, during Festival de musique émergente (August 2013)

== Discography ==
=== Albums ===
| Title | Album details | Peak chart positions | | | | | | | | | |
| Title | Album details | US | BEL (FL) | BEL (WA) | FRA | GRE | ITA | JPN | SWI | UK | UK Indie |
|---|---|---|---|---|---|---|---|---|---|---|---|
| Blonde Redhead | Released: July 19, 1994; Label: Smells Like | — | — | — | — | — | — | — | — | — | — |
| La Mia Vita Violenta | Released: September 1995; Label: Smells Like | — | — | — | — | — | — | — | — | — | — |
| Fake Can Be Just as Good | Released: March 11, 1997; Label: Touch and Go | — | — | — | — | — | — | — | — | — | — |
| In an Expression of the Inexpressible | Released: September 8, 1998; Label: Touch and Go | — | — | — | — | — | — | — | — | — | — |
| Melody of Certain Damaged Lemons | Released: June 6, 2000; Label: Touch and Go | — | — | — | — | — | — | — | — | — | — |
| Misery Is a Butterfly | Released: March 15, 2004; Label: 4AD | 180 | — | — | 77 | — | 50 | — | — | — | 41 |
| 23 | Released: April 10, 2007; Label: 4AD | 63 | 52 | — | 77 | — | 38 | 196 | 100 | 152 | 13 |
| Penny Sparkle | Released: September 13, 2010; Label: 4AD | 79 | 57 | 65 | 89 | 18 | — | — | — | — | 41 |
| Barragán | Released: September 2, 2014; Label: Kobalt | 180 | 68 | 86 | 104 | — | — | — | — | — | — (Note: Barragán did not enter the UK Independent Albums Chart, but peaked at number 17 on the UK Independent Album Breakers Chart.) |
| Sit Down for Dinner | Released: September 29, 2023; Label: Section1 | — (Note: Sit Down for Dinner did not enter the Billboard 200 Chart, but peaked at number 58 on the Top Album Sales Chart.) | 91 | — | 127 | — | — | — | — | — | 50 |
"—" denotes a release that did not chart.

=== EPs ===
| Year | Title | Label |
|---|---|---|
| 2000 | Mélodie Citronique | Touch and Go |
| 2005 | The Secret Society of Butterflies | 4AD/Beggars Banquet |
| 2017 | 3 O'Clock | Kobalt/Ponderosa/Asa Wa Kuru |

=== Singles ===
List of singles, with selected chart positions and certifications
| Title | Year | Peak chart positions | | Album |
| Title | Year | UK | UK Indie | Album |
|---|---|---|---|---|
| "Amescream / Big Song" | 1993 | — | — | Non-album singles |
| "Vague / Jet Star" | 1994 | — | — | Non-album singles |
| "10 Feet High / Valentine" | 1995 | — | — | La Mia Vita Violenta |
| "Flying Douglas / Harmony" | 1995 | — | — | La Mia Vita Violenta |
| "Symphony of Treble / Kasuality" | 1997 | — | — | Fake Can Be Just as Good |
| "Limited Conversation / Slogan" | 1998 | — | — | In an Expression of the Inexpressible (Japanese edition) |
| "Elephant Woman" | 2004 | 82 | 26 | Misery Is a Butterfly |
| "Equus" | 2004 | 84 | 19 | Misery Is a Butterfly |
| "23" | 2007 | — | — | 23 |
| "Silently" | 2007 | — | — | 23 |
| "Here Sometimes" | 2010 | — | — | Penny Sparkle |
| "No More Honey" | 2014 | — | — | Barragán |
| "Dripping" | 2014 | — | — | Barragán |
| "Blood Spilled" | 2026 | — | — | Non-album singles |
"—" denotes releases that did not chart.

=== Other charted songs ===
| Title | Year | Peak chart positions | Album |
| Title | Year | US Rock | Album |
|---|---|---|---|
| "For the Damaged Coda" | 2000 | 15 | Melody of Certain Damaged Lemons |

=== Soundtracks ===
| Year | Film |
|---|---|
| 2008 | The Dungeon Masters |
| 2012 | The Commentator |

=== Compilations and remix albums ===
| Year | Title | Label |
|---|---|---|
| 2016 | Freedom of Expression on Barragán | Asa Wa Kuru |
| 2016 | Masculin Féminin | Numero |
| 2025 | The Shadow Of The Guest | section1 |
