= Smells Like Records =

American record label

- Founded: 1993
- Founder: Steve Shelley
- Genre: Indie rock, alternative rock
- Country of origin: United States
- Location: Hoboken, New Jersey
- Official website: smellslikerecords.kungfustore.com

Smells Like Records is an independent record label based in Hoboken, New Jersey, formed by Sonic Youth drummer Steve Shelley in 1993. Groups that have recorded under the label include Blonde Redhead, Cat Power, The Raincoats, and The Rondelles.

The label's name comes from the 1991 hit "Smells Like Teen Spirit" by Nirvana.

== Roster ==
- Blonde Redhead
- Bluetile Lounge
- Cat Power
- Chris Lee
- The Clears
- Christina Rosenvinge
- Dump
- Fuck
- Hungry Ghosts
- J.P. Shilo
- John Wolfington
- La Lengua Asesina
- Lee Hazlewood
- Louis Barlow's Acoustic Sentridoh
- Mosquito
- Nod
- Overpass
- The Raincoats
- The Rondelles
- Sammy
- Scarnella
- Sentridoh
- Shelby Bryant
- Sonic Youth
- Tim Prudhomme
- Tony Scherr
- Two Dollar Guitar
- Ursa Minor

== See also ==
- List of record labels
