= Scott Miller discography =

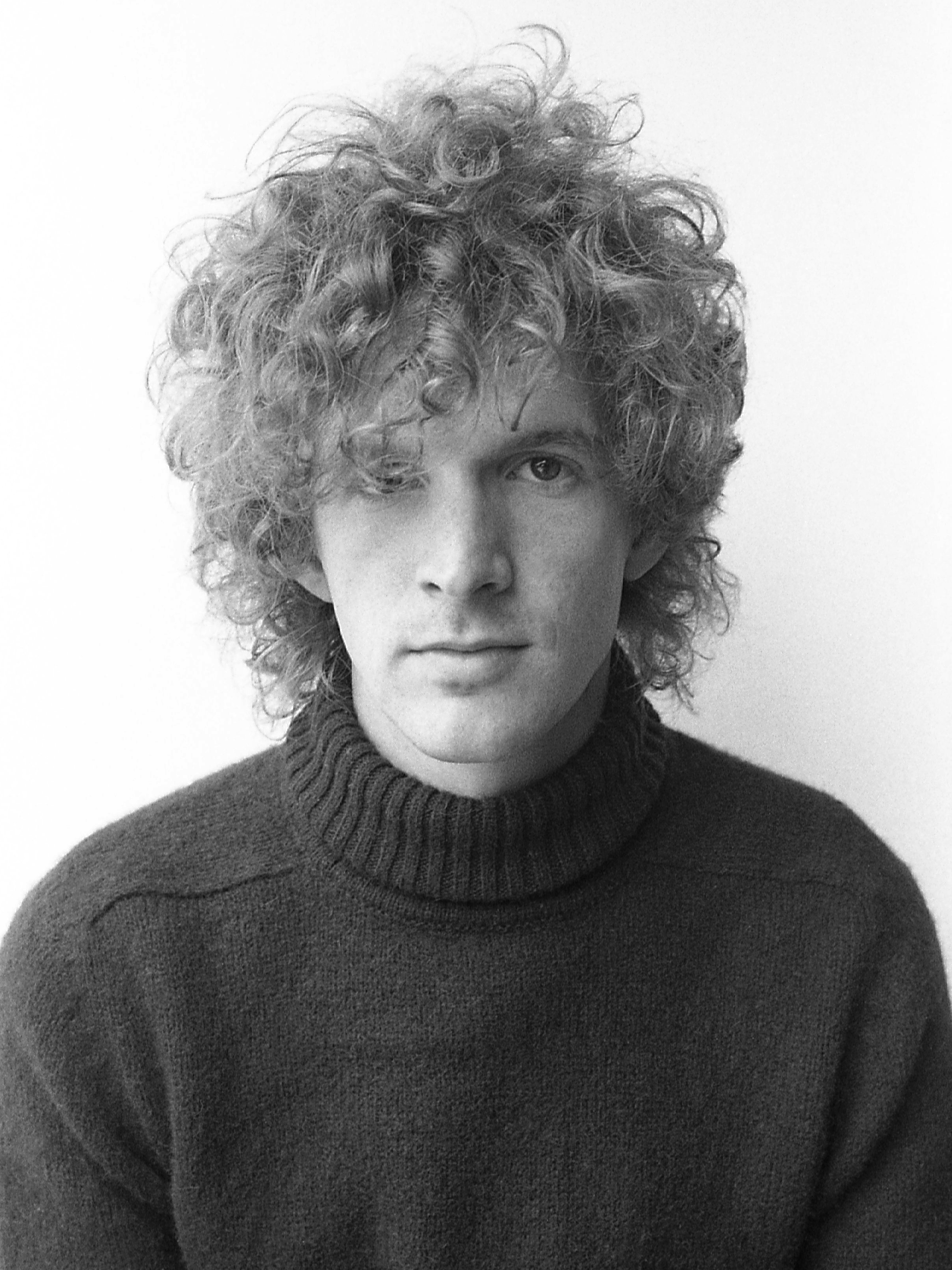
- Studio albums: 13
- EPs: 4
- Live albums: 1
- Compilation albums: 4
- Tribute albums: 2
- Singles: 7
- Video albums: 1
- Music videos: 6
- Various artist compilations: 12

This article presents a full discography of pop musician and singer-songwriter Scott Miller, as the leader of the groups Alternate Learning, Game Theory, and The Loud Family. Miller's discography includes thirteen studio albums (including a forthcoming posthumous release), four EPs, one live album, four compilations, seven singles (including promotional releases), six music videos, and one concert documentary video.

== Studio albums and EPs ==
Group	Year	Title	Format	Label	Catalog no.
Alternate Learning	1979	ALRN	7" EP	Rational	
Alternate Learning	1982	Painted Windows	LP	Rational	
Game Theory	1982	Blaze of Glory	LP; CD (2014); LP (2014, pink)	Rational; Omnivore; Omnivore	ION003; CD OV-96; LP OV-96
Game Theory	1983	Pointed Accounts of People You Know	12" EP; 10" EP (2014, clear)	Rational; Omnivore	ONA-004; OVS10-101
Game Theory	1984	Distortion	12" EP; 10" EP (2014, green)	Rational; Omnivore	RGP 8405; OVS10-102
Game Theory	1985	Real Nighttime	LP; CD; CD (1993); CD (2015); LP (2015, red)	Enigma; Restless; Alias; Omnivore; Omnivore	—; 7 72022; A047D; OVCD-115; OVLP-115
Game Theory	1986	The Big Shot Chronicles	LP; CS; CD (1993); LP (2016, green); CD (2016)	Enigma; Enigma; Alias; Omnivore; Omnivore	ST-73210; 4XT-73210; A046D; OVLP-174; OVCD-174
Game Theory	1987	Lolita Nation	LP (double); CS; CD; LP (2016, green); CD (2016)	Enigma; Enigma; Enigma; Omnivore; Omnivore	STB-73288; –; CDE-73280; OVLP-136; OVCD-136
Game Theory	1988	Two Steps from the Middle Ages	LP; CS; CD; LP (2017, orange); CD (2017)	Enigma; Enigma; Enigma; Omnivore; Omnivore	7 73350-1; 7 73350-4; 7 73350-2; OVLP-204; OVCD-204
The Loud Family	1993	Plants and Birds and Rocks and Things	LP, CS, CD	Alias	A033
The Loud Family	1994	Slouching Towards Liverpool	CD, 10" EP	Alias	A055
The Loud Family	1994	The Tape of Only Linda	LP, CS, CD	Alias	A060
The Loud Family	1996	Interbabe Concern	CD	Alias	A098
The Loud Family	1998	Days for Days	CD	Alias	A131
The Loud Family	2000	Attractive Nuisance	CD	Alias	A146
The Loud Family and Anton Barbeau	2006	What If It Works?	CD; CD (2022)	125 Records; Omnivore	125-013; OVCD-477
Game Theory	2017	Supercalifragile	LP, CD	KCM Records	KCINA22

== Live albums ==
Group	Year	Title	Format	Label	Catalog No.
The Loud Family	2002	From Ritual to Romance	CD	125 Records	125-005

== Compilation albums ==
Group	Year	Title	Format	Label	Catalog no.
Game Theory	1984	Dead Center	LP; CD (2015)	Lolita (FR); Omnivore	5031; OVCD-103
Game Theory	1989	Tinker to Evers to Chance	LP, CS, CD	Enigma	
Game Theory	1993	Distortion of Glory	CD	Alias	
Game Theory	2020	Across the Barrier of Sound: PostScript	LP (pink); CD	Omnivore	OVLP-362; OVCD-362

== Singles and promotional releases ==
Group	Year	Title	Format	Label	Catalog no.
Game Theory	1983	"Dead Center"	7" flexi-disc	Rational	
Game Theory	1985	"24" b/w "Waltz the Halls Always"	7" single	Enigma, Victoria	
Game Theory	1986	"Erica's Word" b/w "Couldn't I Just Tell You"	7" single	Big Time Records	
Game Theory	1987	"The Real Sheila"	12" single	Enigma	
The Loud Family	1993	Never Mind the Camera Crew, Here's The Loud Family	CS	Alias	
The Loud Family	1993	"Take Me Down" b/w "The Come On"	7" single	Alias	A043
The Loud Family	1994	"It Just Wouldn't Be Christmas"	CD single	Alias	
The Loud Family	1997	"Don't Respond, She Can Tell"	CD single	Alias	PRCD A098

== Tribute and cover album appearances ==
Group	Year	Title	Format	Label	Catalog no.
The Loud Family	1995	Sing Hollies in Reverse: includes "Look Through Any Window"	CD	eggBert	ER80018
The Loud Family	1997	Come and Get It: A Tribute to Badfinger: includes "We're for the Dark"	CD	Copper	CPR 2181

== Various artist compilations ==
Group	Year	Title	Format	Label	Catalog no.
Game Theory	1985	Enigma Variations: includes "24"	LP, CS, CD	Enigma	
Game Theory	1987	Enigma Variations 2: includes "Erica's Word" and "Shark Pretty"	LP, CS, CD	Enigma	
Game Theory	1987	The Enigma Compilation 1988: includes "Erica's Word"	LP	Enigma	
The Loud Family	1992	TDK Mail Rock: Serious Music Sampler: includes "Isaac's Law"	CD	TDK/Caroline	CARTDK01
The Loud Family	1993	Fat-Free, Guilt-Free: includes "Soul Drain," "Baby Hard-To-Be-Around"	CS	Alias	
The Loud Family	1993	Hot Cinnamon Churros: includes "Jimmy Still Comes Around," "The Ballad of How You Can All Shut Up," "Back of a Car," "No One Twisting His Arm"	CD	Alias	A040-D
The Loud Family and Game Theory	1993	Alias w/ a Bullet: includes "Slit My Wrists (Live)," "You Can't Put Your Arms Around a Memory," "Girl w/ a Guitar," "Linus and Lucy"	CD	Alias	
The Loud Family	1994	Streamlined: includes "Baby Hard-to-Be-Around," "Ballet Hetero"	CD	Alias	
The Loud Family	1995	Star Power: includes "Horse with No Name"	CD, CS	Pravda	PR6350
The Loud Family	1996	Premium: New Music With A Golden Glow: includes "Don't Respond, She Can Tell"	CD	Alias	A108
The Loud Family	1996	For Discriminating Tastes: The Alternative Distribution Alliance CD Sampler: includes "Don't Respond, She Can Tell"	CD	Alternative Distribution Alliance	ADA 20005
The Loud Family and Game Theory	1997	Year of the Wagon: includes "Don't Respond, She Can Tell," "Spot the Setup," "Erica's Word," "Tin Scarecrow"	CD	Alias	A124
The Loud Family	1997	Yellow Pills, Vol. 4: includes "Chicago and Miss Jovan's Land-O-Mat"	CD	Big Deal	
The Loud Family	1999	The 26th Commandment: Thou Shalt Expand Thy Mind: includes "Asleep and Awake on the Man's Freeway (live)"	CD	Ptolemaic Terrascope	

== Music videos and DVDs ==
Group	Year	Title
Game Theory	1985	"I've Tried Subtlety": from the album The Big Shot Chronicles; music video, directed by Fred Juhos
Game Theory	1986	"Erica's Word": from the album The Big Shot Chronicles; music video, directed by Jan Novello for Novello Productions, art direction by Modi Karlsson
Game Theory	1987	"The Real Sheila": from the album Lolita Nation; music video, directed by Jan Novello for Novello Productions, art direction by Modi Karlsson
Game Theory	2017	"I Still Dream of Getting Back to Paris": from the album Supercalifragile; music video, directed by Hector Di Napoli
The Loud Family	1993	"Jimmy Still Comes Around": from the album Plants and Birds and Rocks and Things; music video, directed by Lucy Phillips and Glen Scantlebury
The Loud Family	1994	"Soul Drain": from the album The Tape of Only Linda; music video, directed by Sondra Russell
The Loud Family	1994	"Marcia and Etrusca": from the album The Tape of Only Linda; music video, directed by Sondra Russell
The Loud Family	1996	"Don't Respond, She Can Tell": from the album Interbabe Concern; music video, directed by Sondra Russell, produced by Jeff Orgill for Giant Tarantula Productions
The Loud Family	2003	Loud Family Live 2000: concert tour documentary on DVD; directed by Danny Plotnick; 125 Records, catalog no. 125-008
