= Alternate Learning =

American power pop/new wave band

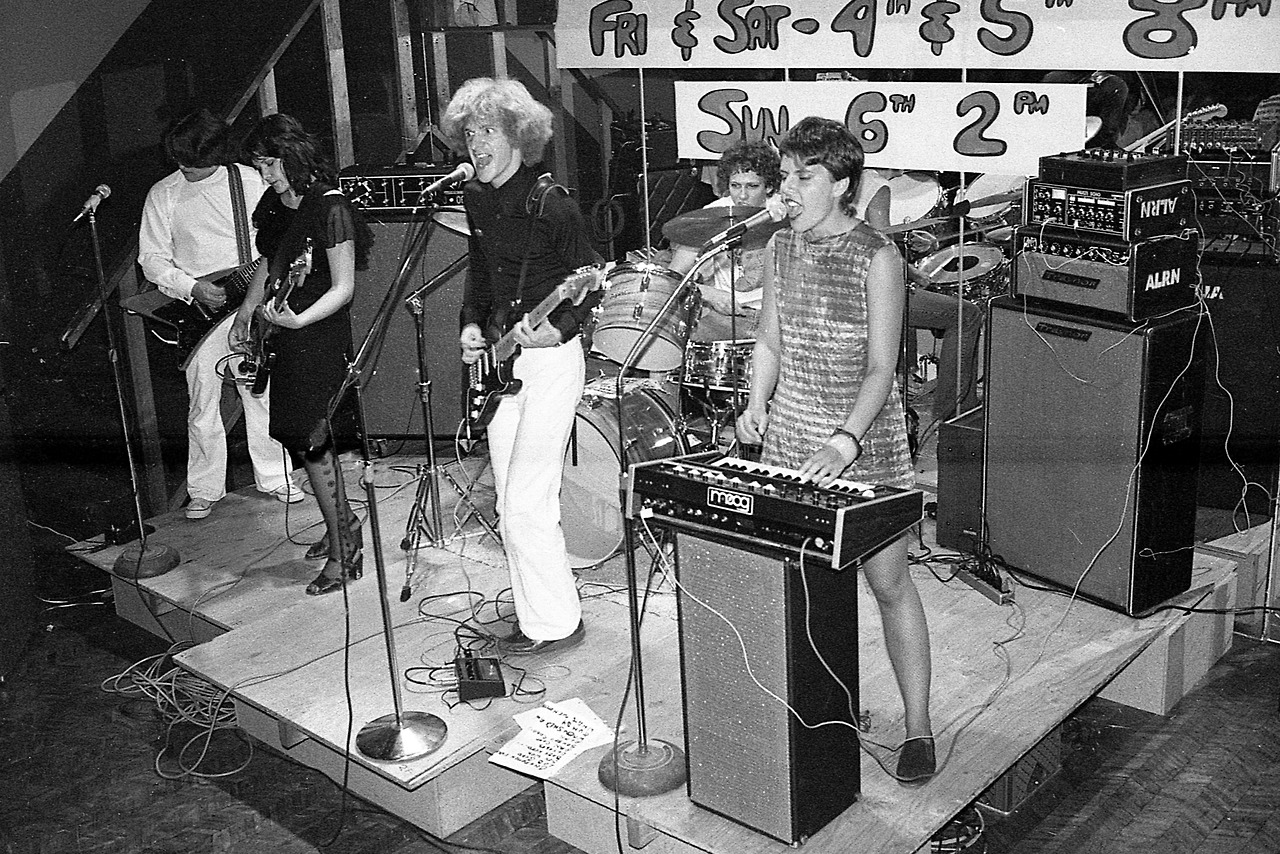
- Alternate Learning performing in 1980.

Background information
- Also known as: ALRN
- Origin: Sacramento, California, United States
- Genres: Power pop, new wave
- Years active: 1977–1982
- Label: Rational
- Spinoffs: Game Theory, The Loud Family
- Past members: Scott Miller; Jozef Becker; Scott Gallawa; Carolyn O'Rourke; Lynn Ross; Eric Landers; Byl Miller; Nancy Becker

Alternate Learning (or ALRN) was a power pop/new wave band from 1977 to 1982, based in Davis, California and fronted by Scott Miller, a singer-songwriter later known for his work as leader of the 1980s band Game Theory and 1990s band the Loud Family.

== Musical career ==
=== Early ALRN period (1977–1978) ===
Alternate Learning, which was Scott Miller's first band to record on independent recording label Rational Records, was initially formed while its original members were in high school. Miller, Jozef Becker, and Scott Gallawa began performing at Rio Americano High School under the name Alternate Learning as early as 1977.

ALRN

EP by Alternate Learning
- Released: 1979
- Length: 12:19
- Label: Rational
- Producer: Scott Miller

The group's self-titled first release, a four-song 7" EP, was recorded by the three original members in Sacramento, in Miller's home recording studio. The EP was independently released on Rational Records in 1979.

The band and the Alternate Learning EP both became known by the abbreviation ALRN, which was prominently featured on the front cover of the debut release. Although the disc was labeled with the band's unabbreviated name, the release is most often known as the ALRN EP. The first EP is also sometimes referred to as the Green Card EP, based on the title of its first song.

Track listing
No.	Title	Writer(s)	Length
1.	"Green Card"	S. Miller	2:49
2.	"What's the Matter"	S. Miller	3:44
3.	"Gumby's in a Coma"	Kern Scott Gallawa	2:16
4.	"When She's Alone"	S. Miller	3:30

=== Original Davis line-up (1978–1980) ===
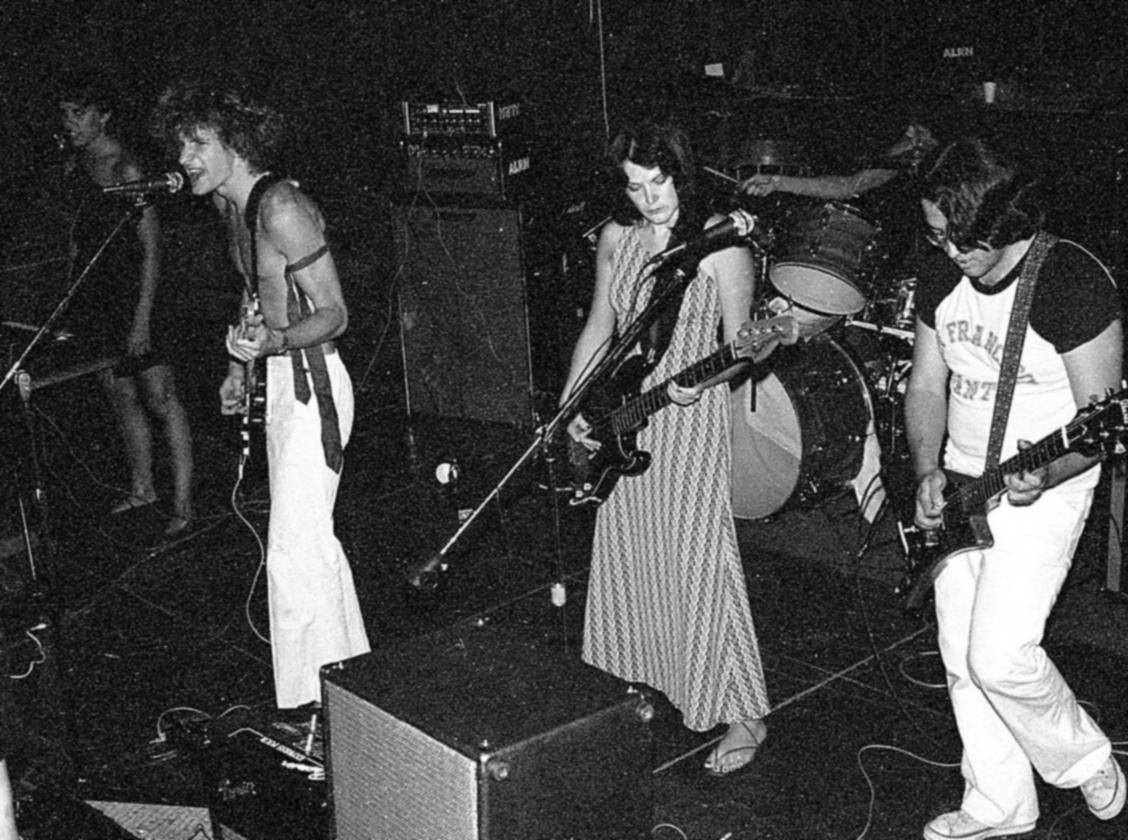
Alternate Learning performing in Davis, 1979–1980. Left to right: Lynn Ross, Scott Miller, Carolyn O'Rourke, Jozef Becker (drums), Scott Gallawa.

In 1978, Miller moved the band to Davis, California, where he was attending college.

Bass player Carolyn O'Rourke and keyboard player Lynn Ross joined the Davis-based band, which became regionally well known for their performances in the Sacramento area, in San Francisco, and most frequently at U.C. Davis.

In 1980, Lynn Ross, Scott Gallawa and Jozef Becker left the group, with Becker citing conflicts of personality. Gallawa and Becker formed the Les-Z-Boys with Guy Kyser; Becker and Kyser went on to become founding members of Thin White Rope. Becker, who was also a member of True West, rejoined Miller as a member of Game Theory from 1989 to 1990, and later was a member of Miller's 1990s group The Loud Family.

=== Painted Windows period (1981–1982) ===
In February 1981, drummer Eric Landers joined Alternate Learning, as did keyboard player Byl Miller (no relation to Scott Miller).

Painted Windows

Studio album by Alternate Learning
- Released: 1982
- Recorded: 1981
- Length: 36:11
- Label: Rational

The 1981 lineup of Alternate Learning recorded a full-length LP called Painted Windows, which was released on Rational Records. During the recording of Painted Windows, Miller distanced the band from the previous ALRN release, writing in a newsletter that the 1979 EP "was not made by the present Alternate Learning, but by Scott Miller with Joe Becker and Scott Gallawa (now of Les-Z-Boys)."

After recording the album, and prior to its release, the Painted Windows line-up debuted in an appearance with Pylon in April 1981. They went on to perform a series of shows from April through October 1981. Although the album was released in January 1982, the band did not perform again until late February 1982.

All songs on Painted Windows were written and composed by Scott Miller.

Track listing
No.	Title	Length
1.	"Another Wasted Afternoon"	3:51
2.	"Sex War"	2:41
3.	"The New You"	6:23
4.	"Dark Days"	4:32
5.	"Occupation: Unknown"	3:19
6.	"Dresden"	2:59
7.	"Beach State Rocking"	2:48
8.	"Ulysses"	1:49
9.	"Painted Windows"	5:03
10.	"Let's Not Wait"	2:12

=== Breakup (1982) ===
After the release of Painted Windows, the group's final show took place at the U.C. Davis Coffeehouse on Saturday, February 27, 1982. The trio of Scott Miller, Carolyn O'Rourke, and Byl Miller performed without a drummer, accompanied by taped percussion and effects, until they were joined onstage by drummer Gavin Blair of the X-Men for their concluding songs.

Alternate Learning was officially disbanded by Miller in May 1982. Within a few months, Miller had formed his new group, Game Theory. The new band included keyboard player and backing vocalist Nancy Becker, who had previously performed on synthesizer as a "sometime" member of Alternate Learning.

== Collaboration with Steve Wynn ==
In 1981, Alternate Learning members collaborated with Steve Wynn to form a trio called 15 Minutes, which released one single on Wynn's label, Down There Records.

15 Minutes consisted of Wynn on guitar and lead vocals, Caroline O'Rourke on bass, and Eric Landers on drums. Their single, "That's What You Always Say" b/w "Last Chance For You," was written and produced by Wynn, with Scott Miller engineering. The A-side, "That's What You Always Say," was later recorded by The Dream Syndicate for their 1982 album The Days of Wine and Roses.

Both songs by 15 Minutes appear as bonus tracks on Rhino Records' 2001 remastered CD reissue of The Days of Wine and Roses.

== Legacy ==
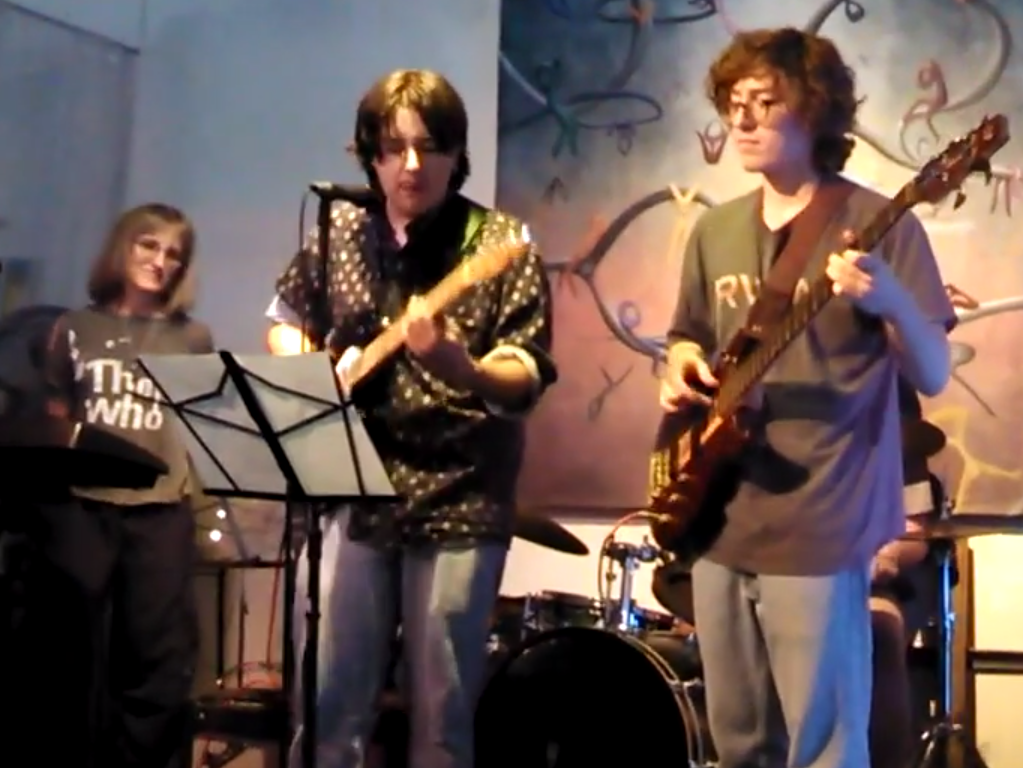
Nan Becker and the Wheels, performing at memorial tribute to Scott Miller in 2013.

=== Material recorded by Game Theory ===
On Game Theory's double album Lolita Nation (1987), the track "Pretty Green Card Shark" includes the opening portion of "Green Card."

In 1990, former Alternate Learning members Scott Miller, Jozef Becker, and Nancy Becker returned to the studio, joined by Michael Quercio, to record a new version of the Alternate Learning song "Beach State Rocking." Despite being a new recording by Game Theory, the 1990 remake of "Beach State Rocking" was the opening track on the chronologically ordered Game Theory compilation CD Tinker to Evers to Chance, released on Enigma Records.

=== Memorial performance (2013) ===
After Scott Miller's death, a memorial tribute concert was held in Sacramento on July 20, 2013, with proceeds directed to a memorial fund for the education of Miller's children. Nancy Becker performed alongside Fletcher Gallawa (son of original member Scott Gallawa) and his band, billed as "Nan Becker and the Wheels," to open the show with a set of Alternate Learning songs that included "Green Card," "What's the Matter," and "When She's Alone."

=== Remastered tracks on Game Theory reissues (2014–2020) ===
Alternate Learning's original master tapes were obtained by Omnivore Recordings after Miller's death, in connection with Omnivore's series of Game Theory reissues that began in 2014. As a result, the 2014 reissue of Game Theory's Blaze of Glory included four bonus tracks from Alternate Learning: "What's the Matter" from the ALRN EP, and "Another Wasted Afternoon," "Beach State Rocking," and "The New You" from Painted Windows.

A newly released live version of "Beach State Rocking" appeared as a bonus track on Omnivore's 2015 reissue of Real Nighttime, and the 2020 Game Theory compilation Across the Barrier of Sound concluded with a remastered version of "When She's Alone."

== Discography ==
=== Studio albums ===
Year	Title	Format	Label	Catalog no.
1979	Alternate Learning (or ALRN)	7" EP	Rational	RAT-001
1982	Painted Windows	LP	Rational	ATI-002

=== Various artist compilations ===
Year	Title	Track listing	Format	Label
1979	The Other #1	"When She's Alone" (side 2, track 15)	CS	The Other Tapes
2004	Homework #9	"Sex War" (track 13)	CD-R	Hyped to Death (H2D #68)

=== Game Theory reissues (bonus tracks) ===
Year	Title	Track listing	Format	Label
2014	Blaze of Glory	"Another Wasted Afternoon" (track 13); "What's the Matter" (track 14); "Beach State Rocking" (track 20); "The New You" (track 23)	LP, CD	Omnivore
2015	Real Nighttime	"Beach State Rocking (Live)" (track 19)	LP, CD	Omnivore
2020	Across the Barrier of Sound: PostScript	"When She's Alone" (track 25)	LP, CD	Omnivore

=== Collaborations ===
Group	Title
15 Minutes (with Steve Wynn)	"That's What You Always Say" (Wynn) b/w "Last Chance For You" (Wynn): Released 1981 as 7" single on Down There Records (DT-1); Released 2001 as bonus tracks 15–16 of remastered CD reissue of The Dream Syndicate album The Days of Wine and Roses on Rhino Records (R2 79937)

== See also ==
- Scott Miller
- Scott Miller discography
- Game Theory
- The Loud Family
