= Couldn't I Just Tell You =

Single by Todd Rundgren

from the album Something/Anything?
- Released: July 1972
- Genre: Power pop; psychedelic pop; psychedelic rock; jangle pop
- Length: 3:34
- Label: Bearsville
- Songwriter: Todd Rundgren
- Producer: Todd Rundgren

Todd Rundgren singles chronology
"I Saw the Light" (1972)	"Couldn't I Just Tell You" (1972)	"Hello It's Me" (1972)

"Couldn't I Just Tell You" is a song written by the American musician Todd Rundgren that was released on his 1972 album Something/Anything?. In July of that year, it was released as a single and reached number 93 on the Billboard Pop Singles chart. The song is considered influential to the development of the power pop genre.

While most of Something/Anything? consists of piano-based compositions, "Couldn't I Just Tell You" is a guitar-driven rock song. Rundgren reflected that there would have been more songs in this style on the album if he had not been performing all of the music by himself: "I was pretty happy with the song because I realized it was the kind of thing I would probably have done more of if I had been using other players."

== Legacy ==
On a television performance in 1978, Rundgren introduced "Couldn't I Just Tell You" as a part of "the latest musical trend, power pop." The song became influential to artists in the genre. Music journalist Paul Lester called the recording a "masterclass in compression" and said that Rundgren "staked his claim to powerpop immortality [and] set the whole ball rolling" with the song. Musician Scott Miller's 2010 book Music: What Happened? calls it "likely the greatest power pop recording ever made," with lyrics "somehow both desperate and lighthearted at the same time" and a guitar solo having "truly amazing dexterity and inflection." VH1 named "Couldn't I Just Tell You" at eighth in their 2014 list "Catchy, Loud and Proud: 20 Essential Power Pop Tracks That Will Be Stuck In Your Head Forever." Stephen Thomas Erlewine of AllMusic considered the song a "terrific power pop classic".

Producer Mitch Easter notes a similarity between "Pretty Persuasion" by R.E.M. and "Couldn't I Just Tell You", and speculates that "Pretty Persuasion" was directly influenced by Rundgren's song.

== Personnel ==
- Todd Rundgren – all instruments and vocals

== Charts ==
1972 singles charts
Chart	Peak
US Billboard Hot 100	93
US Cash Box Looking Ahead	104
US Record World Singles Chart	71
