= Music: What Happened? =

- Author: Scott Miller
- Genre: Music history and criticism
- Published: December 2010
- Publisher: 125 Records
- Media type: Print (trade paperback)
- Pages: 270 pp. (first edition)
- ISBN: 978-0-615-38196-1
- OCLC: 724510113
- Text: Music: What Happened? online

Music: What Happened? is a book of music criticism by Scott Miller, leader of the bands Game Theory and the Loud Family. Published in 2010, it was described by Billboard as "a well-received critical overview of 53 years of rock history".

== Writing and publication ==
In 2006, Miller, a songwriter and guitarist who had founded the power pop bands Game Theory and the Loud Family, turned his efforts to cataloging his thoughts about the music that had inspired him. The writing process began after his decision to take a break from his recording career following the 2006 release of his penultimate album, What If It Works?, with The Loud Family and Anton Barbeau. (A final Game Theory album, Supercalifragile, was completed after Miller's death and released in 2017.)

Thomas Conner of the Chicago Sun-Times wrote that Scott Miller's "encyclopedic knowledge of pop", upon which his music drew, made the book a "shining example of the auteur ideal ... a year-by-year, song-by-song journey from 1957 to this decade, connecting the dots for a macro-perspective on pop". For each year, Miller wrote about ten or more of his favorite songs, providing analytical insights and placing the songs in context in the musical world of their era.

Miller had kept annual countdown lists of his favorite records throughout his life, and his personal project of compiling those lists onto CDs evolved into a formal endeavor to explain what made those songs noteworthy, for what was then the last 50 years of recorded music. Portions of the book were serially published in draft form on his official web site, where he responded to fan requests by writing about one year at a time, in random order.

The book was first published in 2010 by an imprint of 125 Records, the recording label to which Miller was signed. In the second and third editions of the book, Miller's 2010 and 2011 chapters were added.

The cover art, designed by Betsy Lescosky, established a knowledgeable but humorous tone by using photographs of Miller in poses that recreated noteworthy album covers such as that of Liz Phair's Exile in Guyville. The book's title is a comical appropriation from the sensationalist Elvis Presley exposé, Elvis: What Happened? (1977)

== Approach to music criticism ==
Reacting to the state of pop music criticism, Miller suggested, "Part of the problem is that a lot of vital pop music is made by 22-year-olds who enjoy shock value, and it's pathetic when their elders are cornered into unalloyed reverence." He suggested that critics could navigate this problem by being prepared "to give young artists credit for terrific music without being intimidated into a frame of mind where dark subject matter always gets a passing grade", writing that a critic should be able to call a young artist "a musical genius" while "in the same breath declaring that his or her lyrics are morally objectionable".

Miller identified a major issue as critics' failure to "credit an artist with getting a feeling across", citing Lester Bangs as an emotional writer who nonetheless "never really related to his favorite artists as people who develop a skill of conveying feelings. You don't feel that he comfortably acknowledged being moved as a result of their honest work. Artists in his writing were vaguely ridiculous, fascinating primitives, embodying an archetype by accident of nature." Based on past experience as an artist receiving criticism, Miller argued against critics' efforts to maintain journalistic distance or objectivity, suggesting that "acknowledging and respecting readers' stylistic boundaries and keeping their own sentimentality in check" was counterproductive, and hypothesizing that instead, "readers actually want a critic to be their friend by listening through stylistic boundaries with special gold-seeking ears, and reporting how they unexpectedly turned into a love-struck adolescent over a vocal harmony or a piano run... digging the truth of musical experience out from under half-asleep habits of discussing it".

Jezebel's Tracy Moore, in 2014, suggested that one of the virtues of writing about how music made one feel, in contrast with linking it to the sounds of other artists, was to avoid excluding readers who may not have musical knowledge as broad as that of the writer. In contrast, Miller believed that analytical readers would appreciate "more music talk in music criticism", suggesting that "sensitively modest doses" of musical analysis would provide helpful support for a conclusion "that great melody writing occurred or it didn't". For example, he noted that critics rarely "identify catchy melodies as specific passages within a song", in the way that working musicians might discuss "the A-minor in the second measure of the chorus". According to the Chicago Reader, the book "is mostly about the act of listening, but a fair amount of musician talk comes into play, and Miller deploys it gracefully.... As a nonplayer I don't always get his more technical notes, but they're never alienating".

== Critical response ==
In response to the book, the rock critic Robert Christgau wrote, "The way [Miller] describes the songs he loves... is tremendously suggestive. If only he or some acolyte could spin a worldview around those observations, we might really have something to go on."

In a book review in Ugly Things magazine, Miller was described as "a sort of fourth-generation rock and roll renaissance man capable of making the printed page jump and sing as deftly as the complex conversations that his Les Paul conducts with a Marshall stack". The musician Stephin Merritt wrote that Miller "manages actual humor (a first in music criticism) and major insights that may change the way you think about, for example, 1967. Almost a new art form."

According to the music writer Jordan Oakes, "Not only does Miller totally acquit himself as a rock critic, he's produced one of the most interesting compendiums of music journalism since Robert Christgau's Rock Music of the '70s." Oakes called the book "an indispensable collection of rock criticism" and praised Miller's writing style as "great ... very alive, specific and entertaining. He seems influenced by Christgau, occasionally swept away by his own analytics, whimsical at the expense of accuracy, and compulsively iconoclastic. But that almost always makes for fun—never dull—reading."

Miller is the subject of a 2015 biography by the rock critic Brett Milano, titled Don't All Thank Me at Once: The Lost Genius of Scott Miller. Milano described the book as one that not only tells the story of Miller and his bands, but also explores "the college and indie-rock explosion of the 1980s and 1990s" and how some influential artists "managed to fall through the cracks".
