= Blaze of Glory (Game Theory album) =

Game Theory album

Studio album by Game Theory
- Released: 1982
- Genres: Power pop, jangle pop
- Length: 35:05 (1982); 1:15:45 (2014)
- Labels: Rational, Omnivore
- Producer: Scott Miller

Game Theory chronology
Blaze of Glory (1982)	Pointed Accounts of People You Know (1983)

Blaze of Glory is the 1982 debut album from Game Theory, a California power pop band founded by guitarist and singer-songwriter Scott Miller. After Miller's death in 2013, the album was reissued by Omnivore Recordings in a remastered edition with 15 bonus tracks which was released on CD and vinyl in 2014.

== Background ==
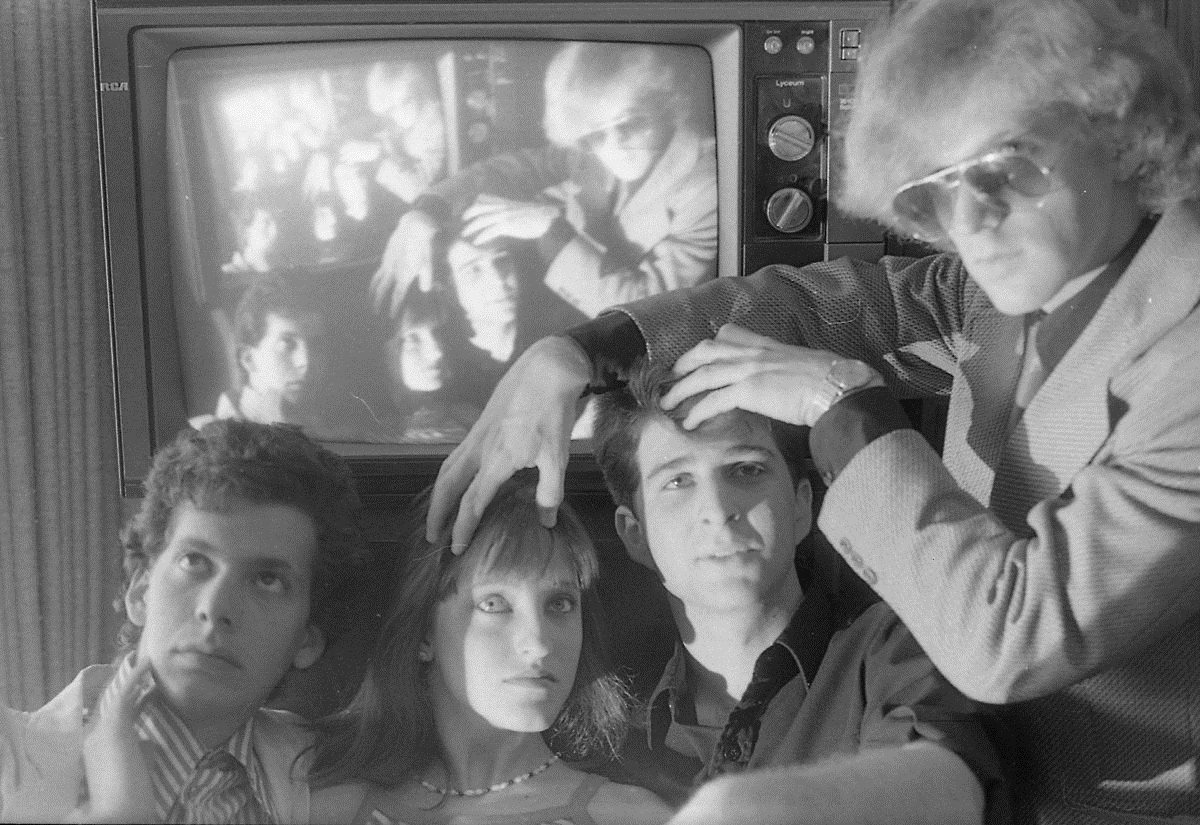
Fan club newsletter photo, Summer 1982. L-R: Irwin, Becker, Juhos, Miller.

Prior to founding Game Theory, Scott Miller had been the lead singer and songwriter of Alternate Learning, which had issued an EP in 1979 and an LP in 1981. Alternate Learning was based in Sacramento and Davis, and frequently performed at U.C. Davis until it was officially disbanded by Miller in May 1982. Within a few months, Miller had formed Game Theory, which included Nancy Becker, who had previously performed on synthesizer as a "sometime" member of Alternate Learning.

== Production notes ==
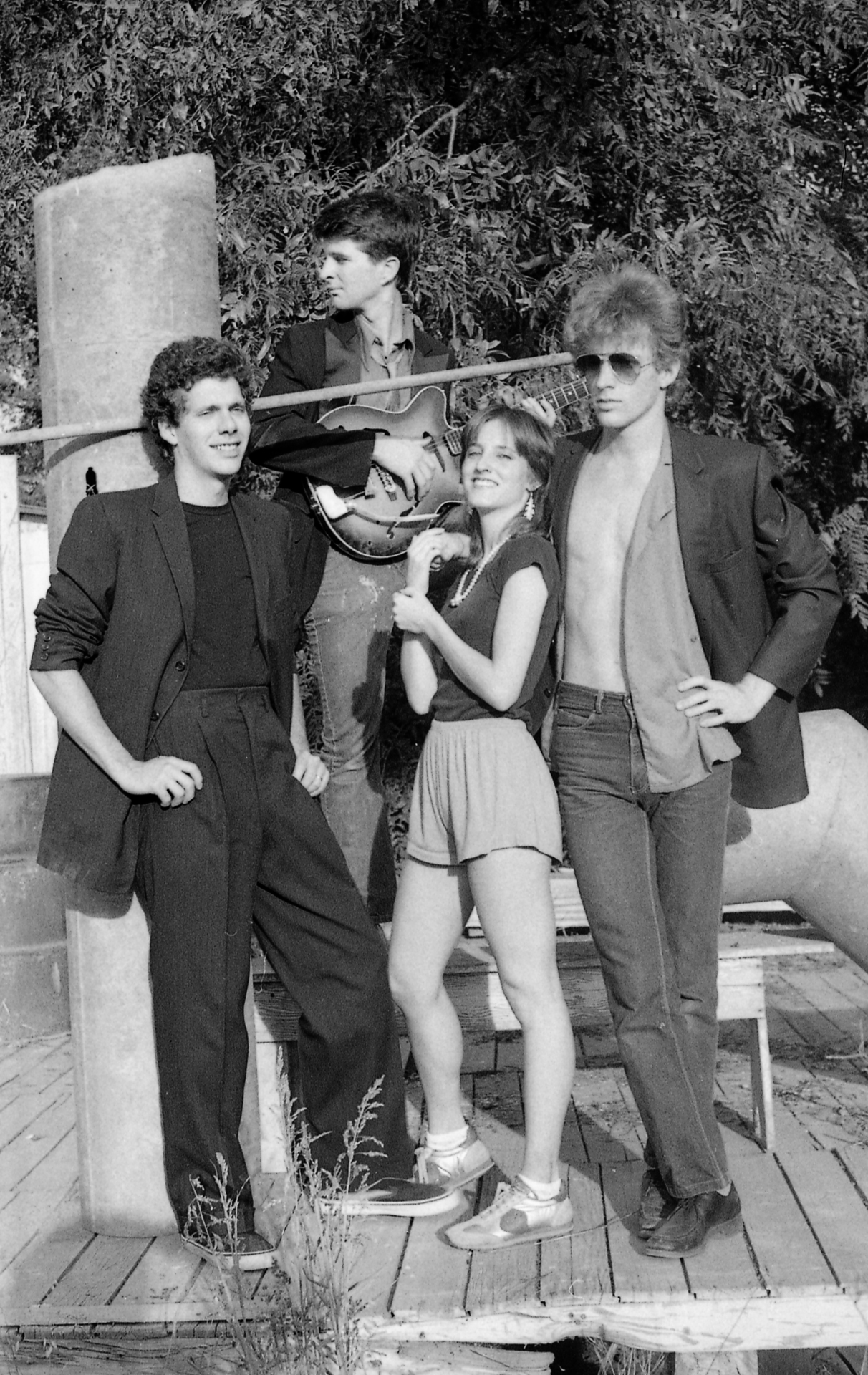
Game Theory publicity photo, 1982. L-R: Irwin, Juhos, Becker, Miller.

=== Original recording ===
Blaze of Glory was recorded by the band's original Davis, California-based lineup of Scott Miller on guitar and lead vocals, Nancy Becker on keyboards, Michael Irwin on drums and Fred Juhos on bass.

With a lack of funds to both press the album and print a jacket, the band packaged a thousand copies of the LP in white plastic trash bags with photocopied cover art glued to each bag.

The album opens with an emotionless female voice stating, "Game Theory: Blaze of Gl—," before the title is abruptly cut off by "layers of chimes and oscillating synths," which, according to critic Franklin Bruno, raised immediate confusion as to whether this was a pop album or an experimental one, causing the listener to question "whether you'll be hearing songs at all."

=== 1990s remixing and re-recording ===
Two songs from Blaze of Glory, "Sleeping Through Heaven" and "Bad Year at UCLA," were re-recorded by the 1990 Game Theory lineup (Miller, Michael Quercio, and Jozef Becker), with Nancy Becker returning to provide keyboard and backing vocals, for the compilation album Tinker to Evers to Chance. "Something to Show" appeared on the compilation as originally recorded.

All of the songs from Blaze of Glory were included on the 1993 Distortion of Glory compilation CD by Alias Records, with some changes from the original release. For Distortion of Glory, all of the Blaze of Glory material was remixed by Miller and Dave Wellhausen, except for the songs "The Young Drug" and "Stupid Heart." In addition, on the song "It Gives Me Chills," the original recording's bass and backing vocals by Donnette Thayer were removed and replaced with newly recorded contributions by Shalini Chatterjee.

=== 2014 remastering and reissue ===
In July 2014, Omnivore Recordings announced their reissue of an expanded version of Blaze of Glory, remastered from the original tapes, which was released on September 2, 2014, on CD and vinyl. The reissue was produced by Dan Vallor, Pat Thomas and Cheryl Pawelski, and was the first in a series of remastered releases of the complete Game Theory catalog.

In addition to the 12 original tracks, the reissue was supplemented with 15 bonus tracks (four from Alternate Learning, and 11 previously unissued recordings). The first pressing of the reissued vinyl LP was on translucent pink vinyl, with black to follow. The reissue also included a booklet with essays and remembrances from band members and colleagues, including Steve Wynn of The Dream Syndicate. The booklet also included previously unreleased images by photographer Robert Toren, some of which were featured in Omnivore's promotional video for the release launch.

Dan Vallor, as co-producer of the 2014 reissue, supervised the remastering of Blaze of Glory from the original tapes. Vallor wrote that the album "remains the wonderfully uncynical pop gem Scott mischievously packaged in a trash bag when it first appeared on vinyl in 1982."

== Songs and thematic notes ==
In the liner notes of the 2014 reissue, Fred Juhos stated that Blaze of Glory "foreshadows Scott's other recordings admirably. Within it, I hear some of Scott's freshest material. It's innocent and contains no hint of the jaded cynicism found in his later work."

Harvard professor Stephanie Burt, writing in 2011, considered this album "true to the visceral power, the sexual charge, in guitar-based Anglo-American pop" while simultaneously exemplifying "the wordy awkwardness... of the nerd stereotype." According to Burt's analysis, "The songs, and the people depicted in the songs, attempted to have fun, to act on instinct, but they knew they were too cerebral to make it so, except with like-minded small circles of puzzle-solvers."

"Something to Show," the opening song, was primarily about "settling; coming to terms with not getting 'the girl,' and who knows what else," according to Franklin Bruno's analysis in The Pitchfork Review. Taking note of Miller's quietly sung first line, "I never wanted to be tough," Bruno commented that toughness "doesn't sound like an option," and called the song "a strange way to announce a rock 'n' roll career."

The song "Bad Year at UCLA" was intended by Miller to refer instead to his alma mater, U.C. Davis, but the location was altered for the sake of scansion and a better rhyme.

At the outset of "Sleeping Through Heaven," according to The Big Takeover, Juhos' bass and "Nancy Becker's period-appropriate synthesizer chords and countermelodies" dominated Miller's "hushed voice in the mix," until Miller raised his voice to sing "with growing confidence in a way that suggests facing fears and emerging victorious," bringing a defiant edge to the chorus, "I want to go bang on every door and say, 'Wake up, you're sleeping through heaven.'"

== Reviews and critical reception ==
Professional ratings
Review scores
Source	Rating
AllMusic	3.5/5 stars
Blurt	4/5 stars
Cashbox	3.5/5 stars
Magnet	7/10
Pitchfork	7.2/10
Uncut	8/10

AllMusic's Stewart Mason wrote that Blaze of Glory was "about as D.I.Y. as it gets.... recorded in leader Scott Miller's old bedroom at his parents' house in Sacramento, CA, and you can just barely hear his mom running the vacuum cleaner downstairs at one point."

In 2001's All Music Guide: The Definitive Guide to Popular Music, critic Chris Woodstra called Blaze of Glory "a pleasant amalgam of '60s pure pop and the quirkier elements of new wave" that "only hinted at the band's potential."

According to Trouser Press, the album was a "promising debut" with "awfully thin sound and more enthusiasm than skill." Conversely, AllMusic's Stewart Mason wrote in 2002 that despite Blaze of Glory′s "extremely inconsistent" songwriting and "funky homemade feel," the album was a "clear signpost towards the hyperactively literate art pop of Game Theory's later albums", with "a handful of early gems." Mason specifically cited "Sleeping Through Heaven" as "jubilant... a fan favorite", as well as "Bad Year at UCLA," with its "wry collegiate angst". Mason also wrote of "Date With an Angel" as "giddy and galloping... one of Miller's sunniest sounding songs," featuring a "jangly guitar-led arrangement" predating the "Paisley Underground-influenced sound of 1985's Real Nighttime."

In 2014, prior to the reissue, Omnivore Recordings wrote that Blaze of Glory displayed the origins of the "power-pop mixed with new-wave sensibilities" for which Game Theory was later to be known, with hints of "the upcoming Paisley Underground sound that would take California by storm," According to CMJ, on Blaze of Glory, Miller's "primitive electro sounds" and jangle pop displayed "a wee hint of punk residue, sounding today like a 2014 indie-pop band landing in 1982, mutated, from a Star Trek transporter."

Reviewing the 2014 reissue, Blurt's Michael Toland described Blaze of Glory as "that special kind of debut album – not perfect, perhaps, but boiling over with so many ideas and so much talent it makes you eager to hear where the band goes with the rest of its career." Toland added:

Considered somewhat raw, even amateurish, at the time of its original 1982 release, the record sounds far more accomplished in retrospect. The low budget nature of the production would be in vogue 15 years later, and the sonics indicate a band that knew how to make the most of its time in the studio. More importantly, Miller's vision for Game Theory – a masterful blend of the catchy, synth-frosted new wave of the day with a 60s-inspired approach to psychedelic arrangements and atmosphere, garnished by lyrics more concerned with feel than meaning – was there from the beginning, springing fully formed from Miller's brow like Athena bursting forth from Zeus' noggin. Tinkly synthesizers weave in and out of jangling guitar paintings, while Miller's inimitable voice – high, keening, edging into a whine but never quite getting there – croons over the top. The rhythm section bounces gracefully between caffeinated bop and elastic shimmy, supporting Miller's whimsy wherever it leads.

According to Wilfully Obscure, the debut "charts the slyly esoteric path that Game Theory were poised to venture off on," and "boasts some profoundly great signature tunes" in a "stunning reissue." Jeff Elbel of The Big Takeover described the band's sound as "rooted in a propulsive, guitar-based jangle." Elbel praised the album's "personal, handmade character" and Omnivore's restoration for preserving its "low-budget origin" with a "clean, clear and full-bodied" enhancement. While the 2014 remastering may have reinforced "certain flaws in the recording and mix," AllMusic's Mark Deming concluded that "the best moments sound better than ever." The Vinyl District ranked the album as #9 (tie) in its list of 2014's best reissues.

The London music magazine Uncut, in its review of the 2014 reissue, wrote:

Sacramento's Game Theory, whose ringleader and songwriter Scott Miller literally brimmed with bountiful nervous energy, agile new ideas of what a pop song could/should be, and enough melodic invention to front a dozen bands, persisted on the fringes of the so-called Paisley Underground. Wielding hooks as lethal as any by, say, The dB's, The Feelies or The Bongos, Miller's gift would fully bloom with the off-kilter classics The Big Shot Chronicles and Lolita Nation (to be anthologised on future Omnivore releases), plus his impressive '90s-era group, The Loud Family. Blaze of Glory, circa 1982, though, was early days. Frenzied and unfocused, but abuzz with hooks atop more hooks, with (one might say) more sonic ideas than places to put them, it plays like a try-out for the varsity. Erudite yet playful, lo-fi yet dense, Miller's songs arrive from a million different angles. When it all unspools fully realised – e.g., the one-minute outburst "All I Want Is Everything", played at a horse's gallop – it'll make you hop around the room. Others, like "Tin Scarecrow" and "Mary Magdalene", might be too overflowing and grandiose for their own good, but fascinating all the same. At its zenith, Miller's songwriting brims with the ebullience of youth, whether rewriting notions of romance – the swirling, carnivalesque "Date With An Angel" – or gallantly philosophising, via righteous critique of the decay brought on by adulthood, as on the timeless beauty of "Sleeping Through Heaven".

According to reissue producer Dan Vallor, who was Game Theory's tour manager in the 1980s, Miller expressed "mixed feelings about his early work. At times he was convinced it was best not revisited, and at other times he appreciated that it could stand on its own. His uncertainty was borne of rigorous standards he set for himself as a writer and as a musician. But his work from the very start shows an unrelenting creative energy rarely matched by his contemporaries."

== Other performances (1987–2014) ==
"Bad Year at UCLA (Reprise)," a thirty-second acoustic guitar version of "Bad Year at UCLA" with Scott Miller humming the vocal melody, appears as a bonus track on the 2014 Blaze of Glory CD reissue. Originally recorded in 1987, the track first appeared as a backward recording on Game Theory's double album Lolita Nation, under the title "Turn Me On Dead Man."

Game Theory's 2013 reunion show, a memorial tribute to Scott Miller, included performances of "Bad Year at UCLA" and "Sleeping Through Heaven."

Since Miller's death, "Sleeping Through Heaven" has been covered in live performances by Bradley Skaught and The Bye Bye Blackbirds.

== Track listing ==
All tracks are written by Scott Miller, except as noted.

Side One
No.	Title	Length
1.	"Something to Show"	2:38
2.	"Tin Scarecrow"	2:07
3.	"White Blues"	3:25
4.	"Date with an Angel"	3:22
5.	"Mary Magdalene"	3:09
6.	"The Young Drug" (original version by Scott Miller & Carolyn O'Rourke)	3:21

Side Two
No.	Title	Length
7.	"Bad Year at UCLA"	2:52
8.	"All I Want Is Everything"	1:14
9.	"Stupid Heart"	2:28
10.	"Sleeping Through Heaven"	4:05
11.	"It Gives Me Chills"	2:29
12.	"The Girls Are Ready to Go"	3:55

Bonus tracks (2014 CD reissue)
No.	Title	Writer(s)	Length
13.	"Another Wasted Afternoon" (Alternate Learning)		3:53
14.	"What's the Matter" (Alternate Learning)		3:42
15.	"Scott Miller Testing Laboratories: Record Test #1"	Scott Miller, Jozef Becker	0:22
16.	"In the Still of the Night" (Scott Miller)		3:36
17.	"Bad Year at UCLA (Reprise)"		0:31
18.	"She's a Woman of the Wind" (Scott Miller)		3:31
19.	"Scott Miller Testing Laboratories: Record Test #2"	Scott Miller, Jozef Becker	0:12
20.	"Beach State Rocking" (Alternate Learning)		2:48
21.	"Aliens in Our Midst (Live)" (Twinkeyz cover)	Donnie Jupiter	4:51
22.	"Untitled Piano Piece" (Scott Miller)		2:53
23.	"The New You" (Alternate Learning)		6:22
24.	"Scott Miller Testing Laboratories: Record Test #3"	Scott Miller, Jozef Becker	0:33
25.	"Bad Year at UCLA" (Live)		3:37
26.	"Scott Miller Testing Laboratories: Record Test #4"	Scott Miller, Jozef Becker	0:18
27.	"Mary Magdalene" (Live)		3:51

== Personnel ==
=== Members ===
- Scott Miller – guitar, lead vocals
- Nancy Becker – keyboards, backing vocals
- Michael Irwin – drums
- Fred Juhos – bass, backing vocals

=== LP credits ===
Guest musicians:

- Jozef Becker – drum overdubs (on "Something to Show" and "Sleeping Through Heaven")
- Donnette Thayer – backing vocals and percussion (on "It Gives Me Chills")

Production credits:

- Photos – Robert Toren
- Cover art – Scott Miller and Michael Irwin
- Recorded at – Rational Sound Lab, Sacramento, CA
- Mastered by – Jeff Sanders at Kendun Recorders, Burbank, CA
- Manufactured by – Rational Records and H.V. Waddell Co., Burbank, CA

=== CD credits ===
==== Performance ====
- Scott Miller – guitar and lead vocals (tracks 1–20, 23–27), piano (track 22)
- Nancy Becker – keyboards and backing vocals (tracks 1–12, 21, 25, 27)
- Michael Irwin – drums (tracks 1–12, 21, 25, 27)
- Fred Juhos – bass and backing vocals (tracks 1–12, 21, 25, 27)
- Jozef Becker – drums (tracks 1, 10), voice (tracks 15, 19, 24, 26)
- Scott Gallawa – guitar and bass (track 14)
- Donnie Jupiter – guitar and lead vocals (track 21)
- Erik Landers – drums (tracks 13, 20, 23)
- Byl Miller – keyboards (tracks 13, 20, 23)
- Carolyn O'Rourke – bass (tracks 13, 20, 23)
- Donnette Thayer – backing vocals and percussion (track 11)

==== Production ====
- Art direction – Greg Allen
- Artwork – Michael Irwin, Scott Miller
- Audio restoration – Michael Graves
- Design – Greg Allen
- Editorial – Eileen Lucero
- Licensing – Bryan George
- Liner notes – Dan Vallor
- Mastered by – Gavin Lurssen
- Photography – Robert Toren, Jennifer Beecroft Polishook
- Producer – Scott Miller (tracks 1–14, 20, 23), Mitch Easter (track 17)
- Reissue producer – Cheryl Pawelski, Dan Vallor, Pat Thomas
