= Annie Zaleski =

American music journalist

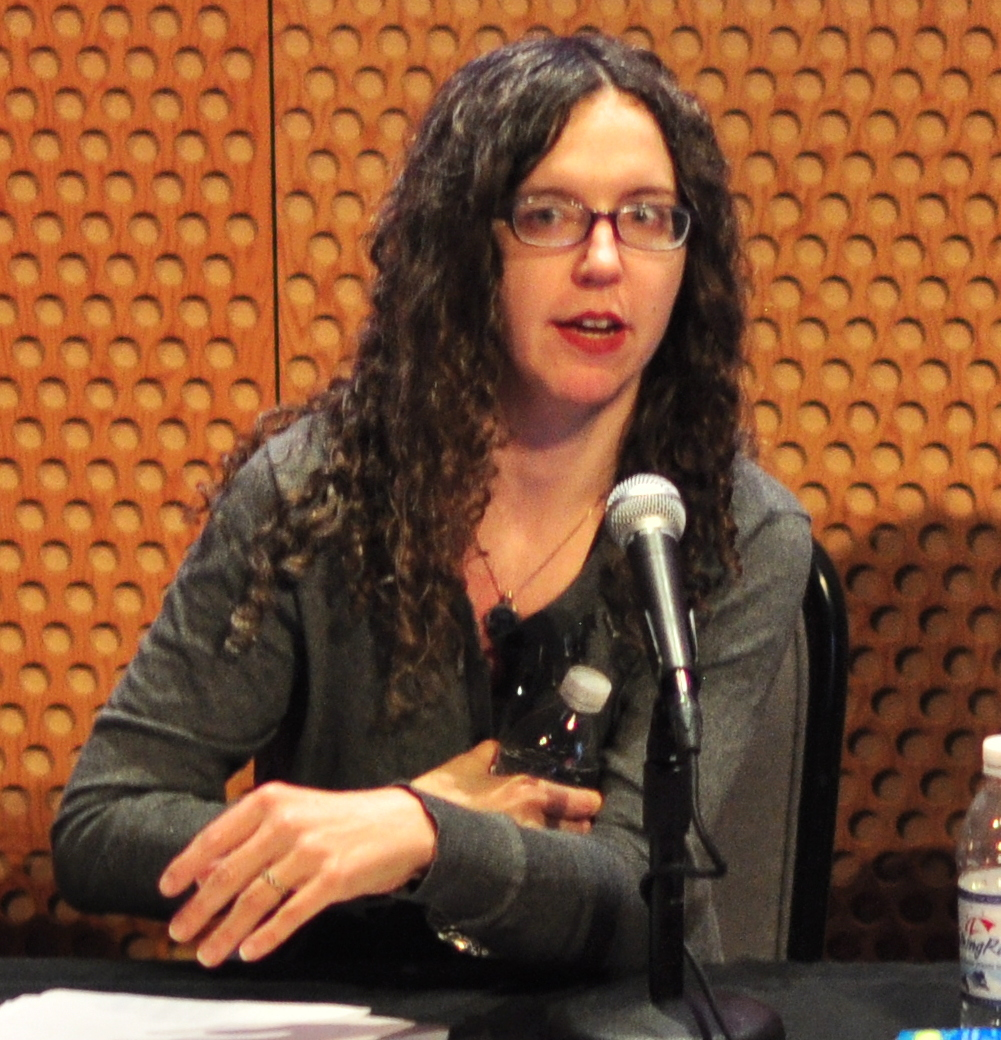
- Zaleski at the 2017 Pop Conference
- Education: Harvard University
- Occupation: Music journalist
- Spouse: Matt Wardlaw

Annie Zaleski is a New York Times best-selling author and music historian.

== Career ==
Zaleski is a writer whose work has been seen in mainstream media outlets including The Guardian, No Depression and NPR Music and previously as a columnist at Salon as well. She is based in Cleveland, Ohio where she has won first place awards from the Ohio Society of Professional Journalists, including Best Arts Review (2017) and Best Feature Writing (2019). Her book, Taylor Swift: The Stories Behind the Songs, debuted on USA Today's Best-selling Booklist in October 2024 and made its debut on the New York Times Best Seller list in December 2024.

Zaleski was previously an editor and music writer at the Riverfront Times in St. Louis, where she also hosted a radio show on KDHX called International Pop Overthrow. She moved to Cleveland to become managing editor at Alternative Press in 2011. She's written liner notes for various artists and bands including the 2016 reissue of R.E.M.'s Out of Time as well as Game Theory's 2020 collection Across the Barrier of Sound: Postscript and the 2023 deluxe edition of Jason Mraz's We Sing. We Dance. We Steal Things.

In 2022, she was commissioned by the Rock & Roll Hall of Fame to write Duran Duran's induction essay. She's continued to write additional essays for the Rock Hall ceremonies, including George Michael's 2023 induction, Cher in 2024 and Cyndi Lauper in 2025. In addition to her work as a writer and author, Zaleski has been a frequent guest on both radio and television, including international appearances on the BBC and CBC.

She was named one of Cleveland Magazine's Most Interesting People for 2025 when the publication revealed their list in December 2024.

== Books ==
Zaleski has written a number of books, including one in the 33 1/3 series about the Duran Duran album Rio which was published in May 2021.

Her additional books include:

- Lady Gaga: Applause (November 2022)
- P!nk: Raise Your Glass (July 2023)
- This is Christmas: Song by Song: The Stories Behind 100 Holiday Hits (October 2023)
- Harry Styles: A Sign of the Times (September 2024)
- Taylor Swift: The Stories Behind the Songs (September 2024)
- We Found Love, Song by Song: The Stories Behind 100 Romantic Hits (December 2024)
- I Got You Babe: A Celebration of Cher (May 2025)
- Beyoncé: The Stories Behind the Songs (September 2025)
- Queens of Disco (November 2025)
- Stevie Nicks in 50 Songs (May 2026)
- Dolly Parton: Stories Behind the Songs (August 2026)

She has contributed essays and other writings to Taylor Swift (Spotlight on a Legend), How Women Made Music: A Revolutionary History From NPR Music, Go All the Way: A Literary Appreciation of Power Pop, Remember the Lightning: A Guitar Pop Journal: Vol. 1, Women Who Rock, Tori Amos: Little Earthquakes, and Joan Jett & the Blackhearts 40 x 40: Bad Reputation

Her upcoming books for 2027 include a book about Celine Dion. Other projects include the book Why the B-52s Matter for University of Texas Press.

== Personal life ==
Zaleski grew up with her parents and brother near Cleveland, Ohio. She attended Rocky River High School and then Harvard University from 1998 to 2002, where she wrote for The Harvard Crimson and was a DJ on the college's radio station. She graduated from Harvard with a bachelor's degree in English. She collects records and is on the board of directors for Lake Erie Ink.

Zaleski married Matt Wardlaw, who is also a music journalist and radio personality, in July 2013.
