= Don't All Thank Me at Once =

2015 biography of Scott Miller by Brett Milano

Don't All Thank Me At Once: The Lost Pop Genius of Scott Miller
- First edition cover
- Author: Brett Milano
- Cover artist: Betsy Lescosky (design); Ana Morales (photograph)
- Language: English
- Genre: Biography
- Publisher: 125 Books
- Publication date: October 2015
- Publication place: United States
- Media type: Print (Paperback)
- Pages: 180 pp (first edition, paperback)
- ISBN: 978-0692484692 (first edition, paperback)

Don't All Thank Me At Once: The Lost Pop Genius of Scott Miller is a 2015 biography of pop musician Scott Miller, written by Brett Milano.

The author, a Boston-based music critic and columnist, described the book as one that not only tells the story of Scott Miller and his bands Game Theory and The Loud Family, but also explores "the college and indie-rock explosion of the 1980s and 1990s," and how some influential artists "managed to fall through the cracks."

Milano, who had long believed that the quality of Miller's work was "way out of sync with the amount of recognition he got," began to contemplate writing the book soon after Miller's suicide in April 2013. Miller's death brought to the forefront Milano's feeling that it was "a bit of a crime" that Miller had never adequately been recognized during his lifetime.

Explaining his motivations for writing the book, Milano stated, "Like a lot of people I was pretty shaken up by his sudden and self-inflicted death in 2013, and thought he should be honored in some way... there’s some earthshaking music here that I have to tell people about." Citing comparisons to Big Star and Nick Drake in a 2016 interview, Milano expressed his hopes and expectation that Miller's music will be rediscovered, bringing Miller "after-the-fact acclaim." The book's release coincided with an expanded reissue of the 1987 Game Theory album Lolita Nation, part of a series of reissues by Omnivore Recordings of Miller's long out-of-print Game Theory albums.

An initial book proposal, focusing primarily on Lolita Nation, was submitted by Milano to the editors of the 33 1/3 book series. The proposal was rejected with "enough encouragement" that Milano decided to go further with the project, to research and write a full-scale biography, and "try to get a handle on who Scott was and how that played into the music he made."

The front cover, designed by Betsy Lescosky, echoes design elements used by Miller in numerous Game Theory album covers, including a distinctive bold italic font, with an oversized capital "G" framing a photo by Ana Morales of Miller performing with The Loud Family.

== Critical reception ==
According to the Austin Chronicle, the biography's "no-nonsense" narrative never bogs down, using interviews to make the case for Miller's "two decades of genius."

Salon's Annie Zaleski noted that the book was not sad but rather "humorous at times, and it brought to life why [Miller's] music was so compelling and smart."
