= Slouching Towards Liverpool =

EP by The Loud Family
- Released: 1993
- Recorded: 1993
- Genre: Rock, power pop
- Label: Alias Records
- Producer: Mitch Easter, Scott Miller

The Loud Family chronology
| Plants and Birds and Rocks and Things (1993) | Slouching Towards Liverpool (1993) | The Tape of Only Linda (1994) |

Professional ratings
Review scores
| Source | Rating |
|---|---|
| Allmusic | 3/5 stars |

Slouching Towards Liverpool is an EP that includes live performances of songs from The Loud Family's first album, Plants and Birds and Rocks and Things, as well as some live studio tracks recorded at WNUR-FM in Evanston, Illinois.

"Back of a Car" is a cover version of a song by Big Star, while "Erica's Word" is a cover version of a song by the Loud Family leader Scott Miller's earlier band, Game Theory. Michael Quercio, leader of The Three O'Clock and a member of Game Theory in 1989 and 1990, plays bass guitar on "The Come On".

The EP's title alludes to William Butler Yeats's poem The Second Coming, which ends with the lines "And what rough beast, its hour come round at last, Slouches towards Bethlehem to be born?" The Loud Family's use is a nod to both Scott Miller's literary interests and to the hometown of The Beatles.

== Track listing ==
1. "Take Me Down" – 3:09
2. "The Come On" – 3:23
3. "Back of a Car" – 2:27
4. "Slit My Wrists" (Live at WNUR-FM) – 2:52
5. "Aerodeliria" (Live at WNUR-FM) – 3:05
6. "Erica's Word" (Live in studio) – 4:04

== Personnel ==
- Jozef Becker - drums and percussion
- Scott Miller - vocals and rhythm guitar
- R. Dunbar Poor - bass guitar
- Zachary Smith - lead guitar
- Paul Wieneke - keyboards and backing vocals
