= Tinker to Evers to Chance (album) =

Compilation album by Game Theory
- Released: March 1990
- Recorded: 1982–1989
- Genre: Power pop, jangle pop
- Label: Enigma Records
- Producer: Mitch Easter and Scott Miller

Game Theory chronology
| Two Steps from the Middle Ages (1988) | Tinker to Evers to Chance (1990) | Distortion of Glory (1993) |

Professional ratings
Review scores
| Source | Rating |
|---|---|
| Allmusic | 4.5/5 stars |
| Chicago Tribune | 3.5/4 stars |
| Christgau's Consumer Guide | (neither) |

Tinker to Evers to Chance is a compilation album of songs by Game Theory, released in 1990. The liner notes describe the included tracks as songs which "reached national obscurity, as opposed to local obscurity." Band leader Scott Miller went on to form The Loud Family.

== Production ==
The album's ironic title refers to Joe Tinker, Johnny Evers, and Frank Chance, who played baseball for the 1910 Chicago Cubs, and who were immortalized in the poem "Baseball's Sad Lexicon." According to Miller, their famous double play was "a case in baseball where someone didn't get a hit, so it was definitely an appropriate title for our greatest hits."

The cover image adds Miller's visual puns on the "evocative" names of the three players, featuring a piece from a Tinkertoy set ("tinker"), a pocket watch ("evers"), and a die ("chance").

Three songs were recorded in April 1989 for this compilation: A cover of "Beach State Rocking" by Miller's first band Alternate Learning and re-recordings of "Bad Year At UCLA" and "Sleeping Through Heaven" from Blaze of Glory. These songs were recorded by the lineup of Scott Miller, Michael Quercio, Nancy Becker and Jozef Becker, and were the final Game Theory recordings before the band disbanded in early 1991.

== Critical reception ==
The Chicago Tribune wrote in 1990 that Tinker to Evers to Chance, while displaying all of Miller's shortcomings during the band's "seven-year history of obscurity", also made a "powerful case" that Game Theory had been "unjustly overlooked." Citing songs such as "the jangly, angst-ridden '24,' the lush 'Regenisraen' and the soaring 'Room for One More, Honey'", critic Mark Caro wrote that Miller "covers heart pains and dissatisfaction with a liveliness and playfulness missing from other literate popsters", displaying "an instinctive feel for pop hooks and textures, and his ambition often pays off, allowing him to hit climaxes like the acoustic guitar rush that elevates 'Throwing the Election' after you'd have thought the song was over."

== Track listing ==
1. "Beach State Rocking" (1989 recording; Original version on Alternate Learning's Painted Windows, 1982) – 2:56
2. "Bad Year at U.C.L.A." (1989 re-recording; Original version on Blaze of Glory, 1982) – 2:58
3. "Sleeping Through Heaven" (1989 re-recording; Original version on Blaze of Glory, 1982) – 4:06
4. "Something to Show" (from Blaze of Glory, 1982) – 2:39
5. "Penny, Things Won't" (from Pointed Accounts of People You Know, 1983) – 5:18
6. "Metal and Glass Exact" (from Pointed Accounts of People You Know, 1983) – 3:37
7. "Shark Pretty" (from Distortion, 1984) – 4:00
8. "Nine Lives to Rigel Five" (from Distortion, 1984) – 2:49
9. "The Red Baron" (from Distortion, 1984) – 3:42
10. "24" (from Real Nighttime, 1985) – 2:49
11. "Curse of the Frontier Land" (from Real Nighttime, 1985) – 3:33
12. "I Turned Her Away" (from Real Nighttime, 1985) – 3:00
13. "Regenisraen" (from The Big Shot Chronicles, 1986) – 3:29
14. "Erica's Word" (from The Big Shot Chronicles, 1986) – 3:56
15. "Crash into June" (from The Big Shot Chronicles, 1986) – 2:58
16. "Like a Girl Jesus" (from The Big Shot Chronicles, 1986) – 2:40
17. "We Love You, Carol and Alison" (from Lolita Nation, 1987) – 3:26
18. "The Real Sheila" (from Lolita Nation, 1987) - 3:35
19. "Together Now, Very Minor" (from Lolita Nation, 1987) – 3:32
20. "Room For One More, Honey" (from Two Steps from the Middle Ages, 1988) – 3:02
21. "Leilani" (from Two Steps from the Middle Ages, 1988) – 3:02
22. "Throwing the Election" (from Two Steps from the Middle Ages, 1988) – 4:11

== Personnel ==
- Jozef Becker – drums, knee slaps
- Nancy Becker – keyboards, vocals, vocals (background)
- Guillaume Gassuan – bass
- Dave Gill – drums, audio engineer
- Fred Juhos – bass
- Scott Miller – vocals and guitar
- Michael Quercio – bass, vocals, vocals (background), reverb, producer
- Gil Ray – guitar, drums
- Donnette Thayer – vocals, guitar
- Suzi Ziegler – vocals
- Shelley LaFreniere – keyboards, vocals
