= The Tape of Only Linda =

Studio album by the Loud Family
- Released: 1994
- Recorded: 1994
- Genres: Rock; power pop; art rock
- Length: 46:19
- Label: Alias
- Producer: Mitch Easter

The Loud Family chronology
| Slouching Towards Liverpool (1993) | The Tape of Only Linda (1994) | Interbabe Concern (1996) |

The Tape of Only Linda is the second full-length album by the Loud Family, released in 1994. The title of the album is a reference to the notorious tape recording of a live performance of "Hey Jude," by Paul McCartney, in which an engineer had isolated Linda McCartney's vocals.

== Composition ==
The Tape of Linda abandons the sound collage aesthetic of the band's debut, Plants and Birds and Rocks and Things (1993), in favor of a relatively more conventional approach, boasting twelve fully-formed songs with live-sounding production. Scott Miller's melodic, Beatles- and Big Star-influenced style of songwriting remains, with heavy usage of oblique wordplay.

== Critical reception ==
Professional ratings
Review scores
| Source | Rating |
|---|---|
| AllMusic | 4/5 stars |
| The Encyclopedia of Popular Music | 3/5 stars |
| MusicHound Rock: The Essential Album Guide | 4/5 stars |

Trouser Press wrote that "the sound is sharp, and the quintet rocks out with an epic mélange of amped-up guitars, odd rhythms and insinuating keyboard riffs, but the disappointing end result is neither particularly inventive nor especially tuneful."

Describing the Loud Family as 'art rock with laughs', Stereo Review critic Steve Simels felt that The Tape of Only Linda confirmed the band were "the smartest, most imaginative rock band in America, the closest we Yanks have ever come to a homegrown version of XTC."

== Track listing ==
1. "Soul Drain" (Miller, Smith, Wieneke)– 4:12
2. "My Superior" (Smith, Miller)– 4:49
3. "Marcia and Etrusca" (Miller, Becker, Smith, Wieneke, Poor)– 7:14
4. "Hyde Street Virgins" (Miller)– 4:02
5. "Baby Hard-to-Be-Around" (Miller, Becker, Smith, Wieneke, Poor)– 3:32
6. "It Just Wouldn't Be Christmas" (Miller, Smith, Wieneke, Poor, Becker)– 4:38
7. "Better Nature" (Wieneke)– 3:25
8. "Still Its Own Reward" (Miller)– 4:12
9. "For Beginners Only" (Smith)– 2:41
10. "Ballet Hetero" (Miller, Poor, Smith)– 7:27

== Personnel ==
- Jozef Becker – drums, percussion, drum programming
- Scott Miller – lead vocal, guitar, classical guitar
- R. Dunbar Poor – bass guitar and backing vocals
- Zachary Smith – lead guitar, electromagnetic 12-string guitar, pedal effect guitar
- Paul Wieneke – keyboards, backing vocals, lead vocal on "Better Nature" and "For Beginners Only"

with:

- "Waxy" Bill Dupp – harmonica
- Mitch Easter – producer
- Kid Shaline – backing vocals
- Ken Stringfellow – guitar, duet vocal on "Still Its Own Reward"
