= Distortion of Glory =

Compilation album by Game Theory
- Released: 1993
- Recorded: 1982–1990
- Genre: Power pop
- Length: 1:14:09
- Label: Alias
- Producer: Scott Miller (tracks 1–17); Michael Quercio (tracks 18–22)

Game Theory chronology
Tinker to Evers to Chance (1990)	Distortion of Glory (1993)	Supercalifragile (2017)

Distortion of Glory is a 1993 compilation album from the band Game Theory, a California power pop band fronted by guitarist and singer-songwriter Scott Miller. Issued on CD by Alias Records, it anthologizes the band's debut album, most of the songs from two subsequent EPs, and one rare single.

== Background ==
By mid-1982, Scott Miller had assembled the first iteration of Game Theory, which consisted of Miller (lead guitar, vocals), Nancy Becker (keyboards, vocals), Fred Juhos (bass, guitar, vocals), and Michael Irwin (drums).

The first Game Theory album was the Blaze of Glory LP, released on Rational Records in 1982. Due to a lack of funds to both press the album and print a jacket, a thousand copies of the LP were packaged in white plastic trash bags with Xeroxed cover art glued to each bag.

With Dave Gill replacing Michael Irwin on drums, two 12-inch EPs followed. In 1983, the group released the six-song EP Pointed Accounts of People You Know, recorded at Samurai Sound Studio, which was co-owned by Gill. The group then recorded the five-song Distortion EP in December 1983 (released 1984), with The Three O'Clock's Michael Quercio producing.

The song "Dead Center," a rare promotional single, was recorded in 1983 as a 7-inch flexidisc for distribution with the music magazine Option.

== Production notes ==
Distortion of Glory was remastered and released by Alias Records in 1993.

All of the material from Blaze of Glory and Pointed Accounts, except for "The Young Drug" and "Stupid Heart," was remixed in 1990 by Miller and Dave Wellhausen. For the song "It Gives Me Chills," the original recording's bass and backing vocals by Donnette Thayer were removed and replaced with newly recorded contributions by Shalini Chatterjee.

Although the two EPs included three songs that were written by Fred Juhos, only one Juhos song was included on Distortion of Glory. Juhos's contributions had been criticized as failing to mesh with Miller's, though Miller defended his early decision to record Juhos's songs as a Beatles-like "relief from seriousness,"

== Critical response ==
Professional ratings
Review scores
Source	Rating
AllMusic	3/5 stars

Reviewers of Distortion of Glory wrote that the band had improved with each successive EP, both featuring "some stellar material." Notable songs included "The Red Baron", cited as "heartbreaking ... an anguished acoustic lost-love song leavened by keyboardist Nancy Becker's mocking 'fifty or more' backing vocal," as well as "Shark Pretty," which featured guest lead guitar by Bowie sideman Earl Slick (credited as Ernie Smith).

In the 2002 book All Music Guide to Rock: The Definitive Guide to Rock, Pop, and Soul, reviewer Stewart Mason cited the "winsome" song "Penny, Things Won't," and the "sneering rocker" "Metal and Glass Exact," naming them as examples of "stellar material" that originally appeared on the Pointed Accounts EP.

"Dead Center," a rarity from a promotional single, was distinguished by a "freaky opening" which featured "layered voices, odd sounds, and snatches of bandmember interviews" that foreshadowed the experimentalism of the band's 1987 double album Lolita Nation.

== Track listing ==
All tracks are written by Scott Miller, except as noted.

No.	Title	Length
1.	"Something to Show"	2:37
2.	"Tin Scarecrow"	2:08
3.	"White Blues"	3:26
4.	"Date with an Angel"	3:22
5.	"Mary Magdalene"	3:09
6.	"The Young Drug" (original version by Scott Miller & Carolyn O'Rourke)	3:22
7.	"Bad Year at UCLA"	2:53
8.	"All I Want Is Everything"	1:14
9.	"Stupid Heart"	2:29
10.	"Sleeping Through Heaven"	4:06
11.	"It Gives Me Chills" (re-recorded with bass & vocals from Shalini Chatterjee)	2:29
12.	"T.G.A.R.T.G."	3:55
13.	"Dead Center"	6:07
14.	"Penny, Things Won't"	5:18
15.	"Metal and Glass Exact"	3:36
16.	"Selfish Again"	4:07
17.	"Life in July" (written by Scott Miller and Nancy Becker)	2:41
18.	"Shark Pretty" (guest lead guitar by Earl Slick)	3:59
19.	"Nine Lives to Rigel Five"	2:44
20.	"The Red Baron"	3:41
21.	"Kid Convenience" (written by Fred Juhos; guest lead guitar by Earl Slick)	3:09
22.	"Too Late for Tears"	3:44
