= Scott Miller (pop musician) =

American songwriter (1960-2013)

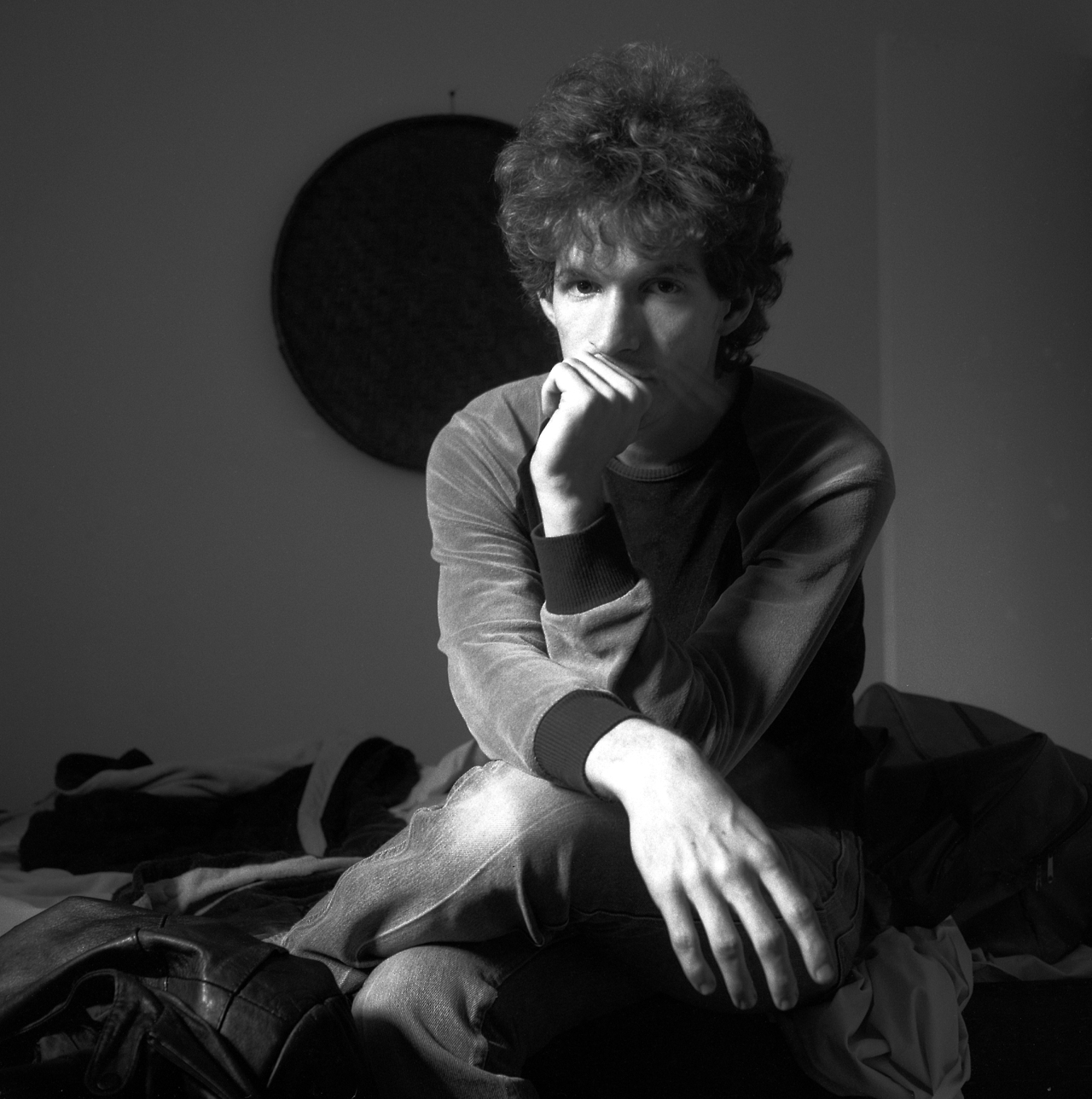
- Scott Miller in 1983, during recording of Game Theory's Distortion EP.

Background information
- Born: Scott Warren Miller; April 4, 1960; Sacramento, California, U.S.
- Died: April 15, 2013 (aged 53)
- Genres: Power pop; jangle pop
- Occupations: Pop musician; songwriter; music critic
- Instruments: Guitar; vocals
- Years active: 1979–2013
- Labels: Rational; Enigma; Alias; 125 Records
- Website: loudfamily.com

Scott Warren Miller (April 4, 1960 – April 15, 2013) was an American singer, songwriter and guitarist, best known for his work as leader of the 1980s band Game Theory and 1990s band The Loud Family, and as the author of a 2010 book of music criticism. He was described by The New York Times as "a hyperintellectual singer and songwriter who liked to tinker with pop the way a born mathematician tinkers with numbers", having "a shimmery-sweet pop sensibility, in the tradition of Brian Wilson and Alex Chilton."

A biography of Miller by Brett Milano was published in October 2015, and Miller's posthumously completed final Game Theory album, Supercalifragile, was released in a limited first pressing in August 2017.

In 2014, Omnivore Recordings began releasing a series of reissues of Miller's entire Game Theory catalog, which had for decades been out of print. Omnivore concluded the series in 2020 with Across the Barrier of Sound: PostScript, an album of previously unreleased Game Theory material recorded in 1989 and 1990.

== Early life ==
Scott Miller was born in Sacramento, California in 1960. He was of Scottish and Irish ancestry, and his mother's family had lived in the Sacramento area since at least the 1850s California Gold Rush. His father, Vaughn Miller, was an Army veteran of World War II who had a long career working for the state of California.

Miller was an only child whose musical interests began "sometime as a six or seven year old, listening to the Monkees and the Beatles." However, his earliest musical influences were wider-ranging, springing from his father's "immense record collection – lots of Broadway show tunes. But the things I was really interested in were these New York folk scene records ... the Womenfolk being really prototypical. And after that it was the Beatles all the way. They were gods walking the earth to me."

At age nine, while taking folk and classical guitar lessons from Tiny Moore, Miller was writing "little albums' worth" of derivative songs, and started his first band, innocently calling it the Monkees. He later noted, "We were really little kids, and we didn't realize you had to have your own personality... I was Mike Nesmith, of course." By 1971, Miller began to learn rock guitar and "had pretty serious bands from seventh grade on."

While attending Rio Americano High School, Miller and his longtime friend and bandmate Jozef Becker formed bands called Lobster Quadrille, Mantis and Resistance, as well as the first version of Alternate Learning. Miller began recording his music at age 15, when he obtained his first TEAC multitrack recording machine. He reminisced in 1993: "Writing songs like the Beatles and trying to obtain real equipment – that's been my goal in life since I can remember." Some of Miller's early recordings from 1975 to 1979 were released in the 1990s to his fan club as a cassette titled Adolescent Embarrassment-Fest; several others appear as bonus tracks on the 2014 CD reissue of Blaze of Glory (1982).

Another passion of Miller's youth was art. He noted that, until college, "I was extremely serious about being a visual artist, and only so-serious about doing music. I was producing really bad music and really good art."

== Musical career ==
=== Alternate Learning (1977–1982) ===
Miller's first band to release commercial recordings, Alternate Learning (also known as ALRN), released its self-titled seven-inch EP in 1979, and a full-length LP called Painted Windows in 1981, on Rational Records. Alternate Learning was formed in 1977 in Sacramento, moved in 1978 to Davis, California, and performed frequently at UC Davis and in the Bay Area until the group was disbanded by Miller in 1982.

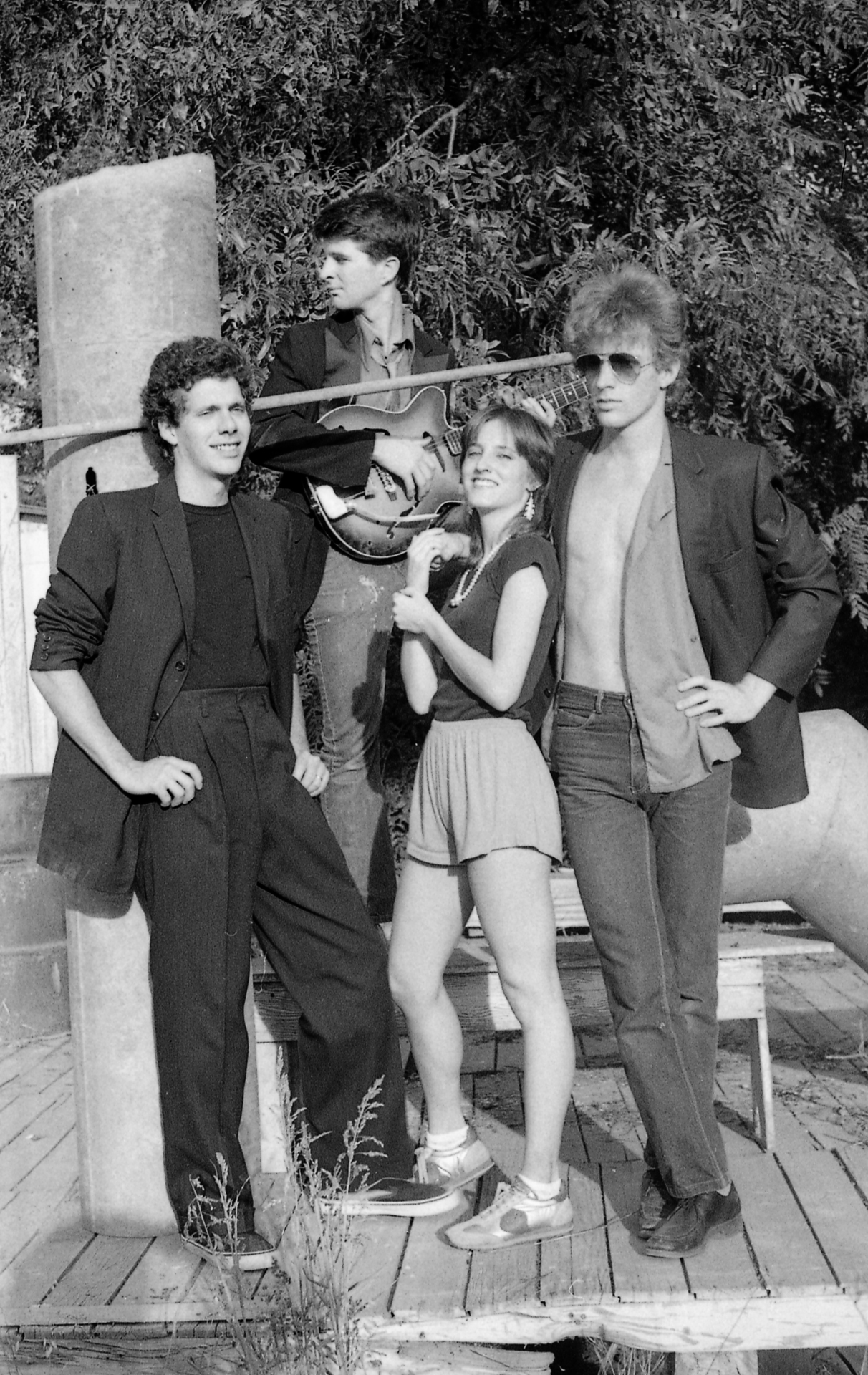
First Game Theory lineup, Davis, California, 1982. L-R: Irwin, Juhos, N. Becker, Miller.

=== Game Theory (1982–1990) ===
Game Theory was formed by Miller in 1982 in Davis, California, and moved its base to the Bay Area in 1985. From 1982 to 1990, Game Theory released five studio albums and two EPs.

The early Game Theory was described as a "pseudo-psychedelic pop quartet" for which Miller sang and wrote "almost all of the material." The group, a college-rock favorite associated with the Paisley Underground scene of Los Angeles and Davis, developed a strong cult following.

The Davis-based first lineup of Game Theory featured Miller on lead guitar and vocals, with keyboard player Nancy Becker, bassist Fred Juhos and drummer Michael Irwin. This lineup released the group's debut LP, Blaze of Glory, in 1982. With new drummer Dave Gill, two EPs followed: Pointed Accounts of People You Know (1983) and Distortion (1984). The group's second full-length album, Real Nighttime (1985), marked the entrance of producer Mitch Easter, who continued as producer for all of the group's subsequent releases.

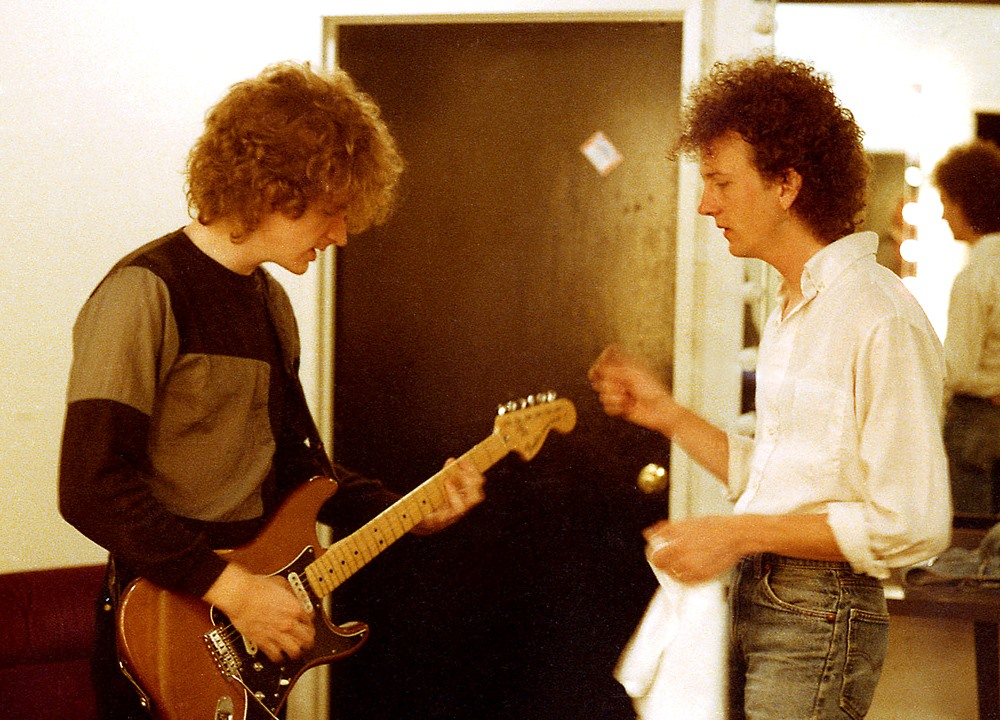
Miller and Gil Ray, prior to first show of new lineup, 1985.

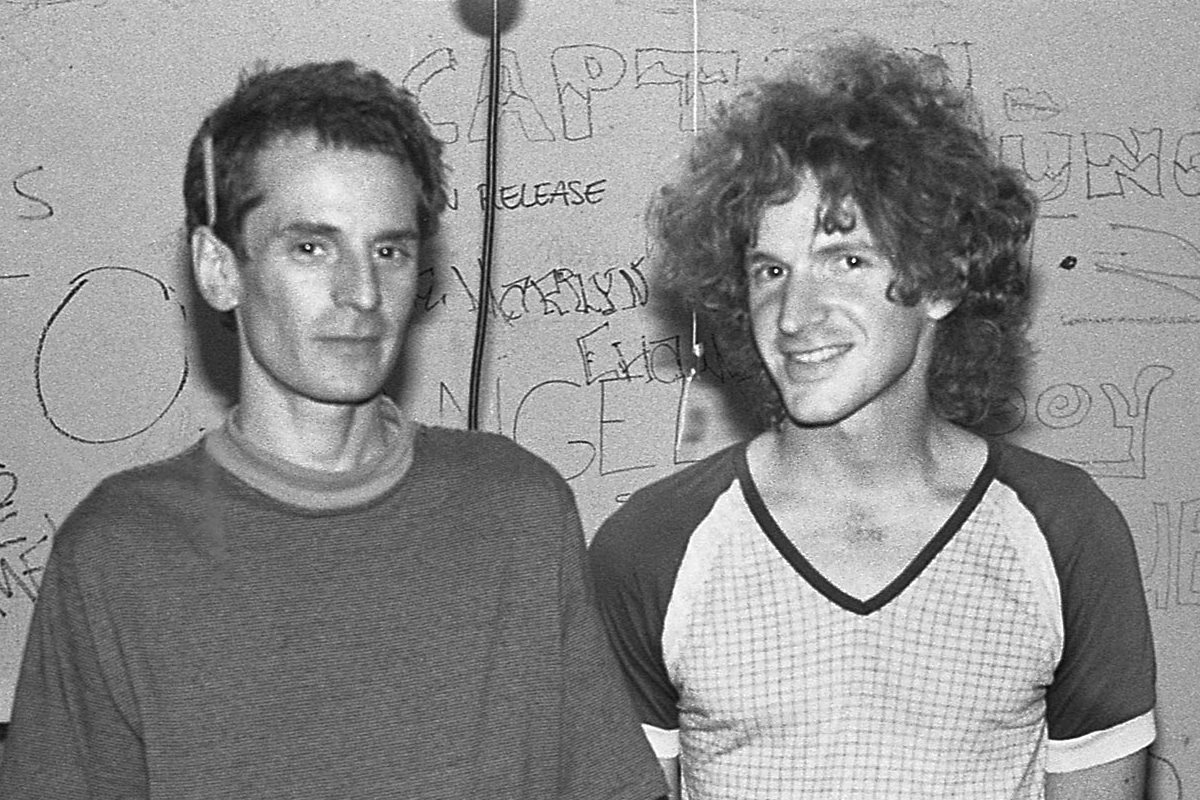
Alex Chilton and Scott Miller, Berkeley, 1986.

Miller recruited a new lineup of members based in San Francisco to tour after the 1985 release of Real Nighttime. During that tour, the new quartet of Miller, Shelley LaFreniere on keyboards, Gil Ray on drums and Suzi Ziegler on bass recorded The Big Shot Chronicles (1986). Ziegler left the group shortly afterward. For the band's national tour in late 1986, supporting the release of The Big Shot Chronicles, Miller, LaFreniere and Ray were joined by two new members, bassist Guillaume Gassuan and guitarist/vocalist Donnette Thayer. This lineup recorded the double album Lolita Nation (1987) and the group's final studio album, Two Steps from the Middle Ages (1988).

Despite favorable critical response, Miller was unable to achieve commercial success with Game Theory. According to Rolling Stone, the group "never garnered more than a cult following through its six-album run (even so, those who caught on will swear that its Lolita Nation was an overlooked masterpiece)."

Among the practical obstacles that stood in the way of the group's success, Game Theory experienced substantial turnovers of personnel after three of their five studio albums were recorded, which disrupted promotional plans and concert tours following the releases of Real Nighttime, The Big Shot Chronicles and Two Steps from the Middle Ages. The release of Two Steps from the Middle Ages was said to be plagued by difficulties, which included Miller's breakup with Thayer. After Thayer left to form Hex with Steve Kilbey of the Church, LaFreniere and Gassuan also left the group. In addition, Enigma Records, which distributed Game Theory's records, folded in 1989 soon after the release of Two Steps.

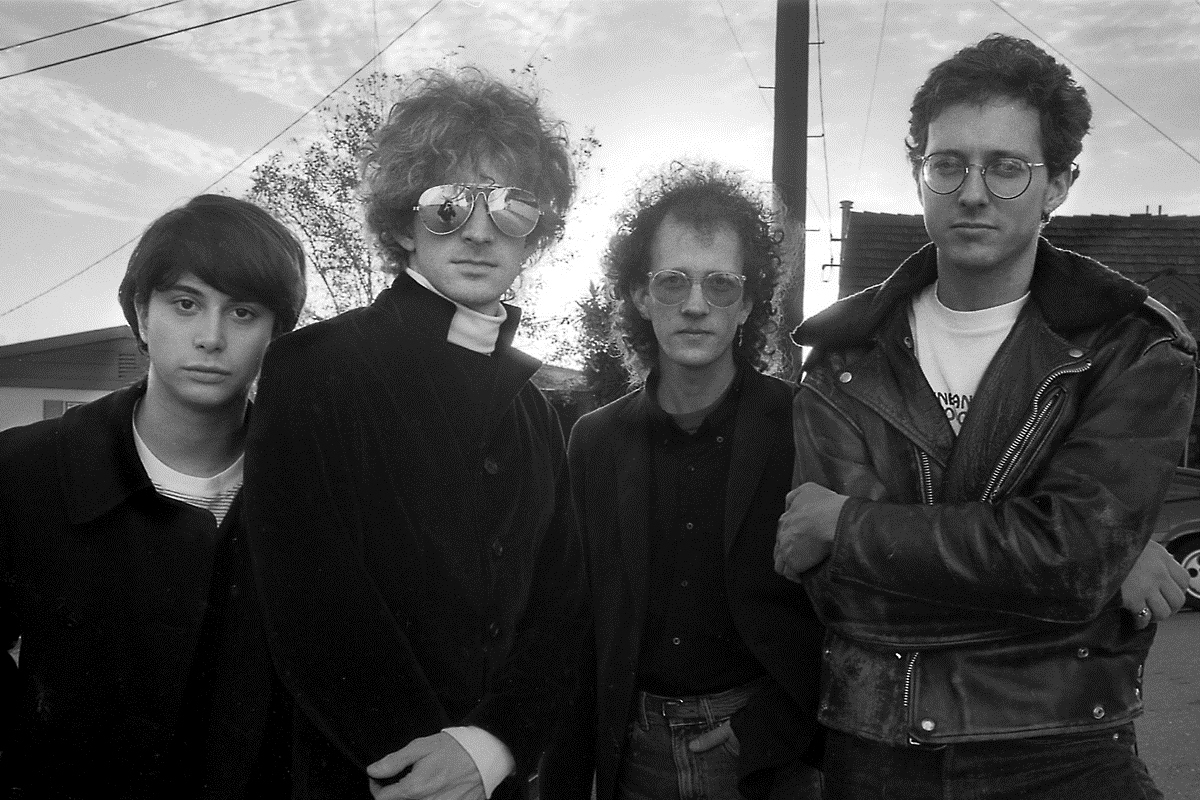
Game Theory, 1990. L-R: Quercio, Miller, Ray, J. Becker.

Game Theory continued to tour in 1989 and 1990, with Michael Quercio of the Three O'Clock (who had produced Game Theory's Distortion EP) joining as a member, along with Jozef Becker. Prior to the 1989 tour, Ray sustained a serious back injury that left him temporarily unable to play drums. He switched to guitar and keyboards but left the group in 1990. In 1990, Miller recruited original member Nancy Becker to rejoin the group for its final released recordings, in which new versions of three songs (including one previously recorded by Alternate Learning) were recorded for Game Theory's best-of compilation CD, Tinker to Evers to Chance (1990).

Game Theory's releases had long been out of print and difficult to find, contributing to the band's inability to transcend what Miller described as "national obscurity, as opposed to regional obscurity."

After Miller's death, surviving members of Game Theory reunited on July 20, 2013 for a memorial tribute performance in Sacramento.

=== The Loud Family (1991–2006) ===
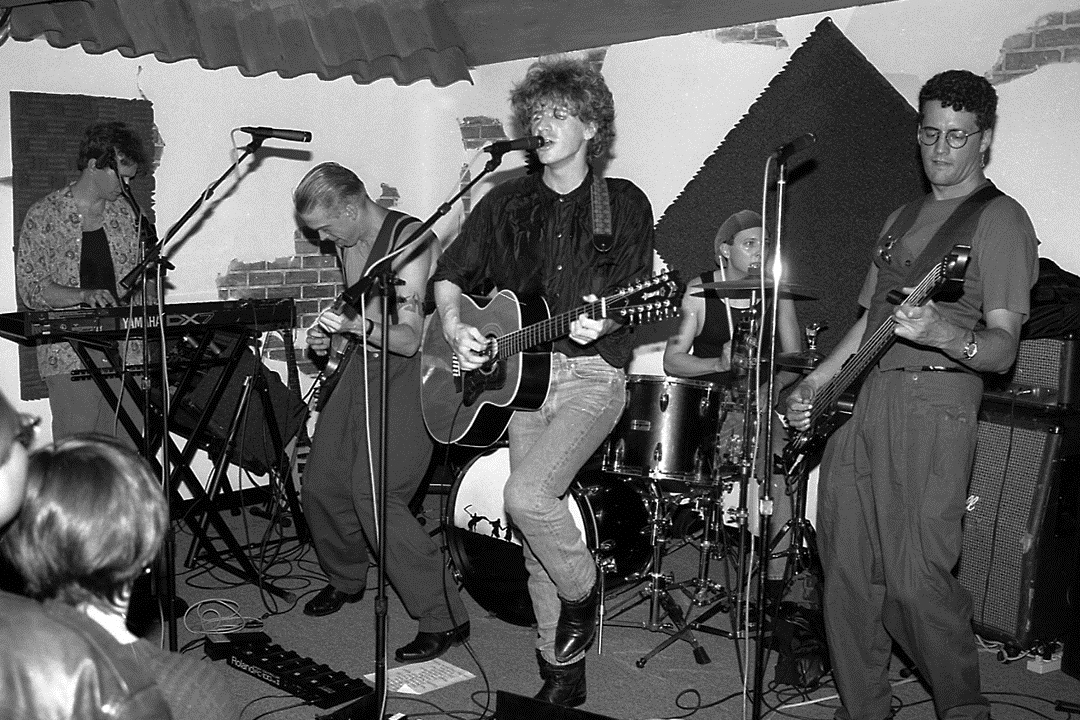
The Loud Family at Bottom of the Hill, San Francisco, 1992.

With a new lineup in 1991 and a new recording label, Miller retired the name Game Theory and chose to call his new group The Loud Family. Rolling Stone described this name as both "a hip allusion to the mid-Seventies PBS series An American Family" and "a clever way to describe the sound and feel of the band. Either way, it's a great hook—smart, funny and instantly memorable. All of which, appropriately enough, are qualities shared by Miller's songs." Miller later described his intended reality-show metaphor: "Going through life is a lot like having cameras on you and you have to perform, but there's no script; you just have to do the normal kind of bumbling thing. Besides, it had the word 'loud' in it."

Stereo Review, introducing the Loud Family and eulogizing Game Theory, called Miller "an entity unto himself, taking dictation from a mind working overtime without stopping to consider the possibility of success or banishment. Problem is, [while] others have squeezed through the needle's eye to varying degrees ... Miller still labors in semi-obscurity, his back catalog bulging like Ph.D. theses interred in some musty corner of a rarely visited library." Assessing Miller's prospects of success, the article continued:

Let's face it: Smart rock doesn't sell. Despite the best efforts of critics, despite the support of introspective, collegiate humanities majors who have assimilation problems, even despite the soft spot certain record companies occasionally show for music with a brain, the market share is marginal. Therefore, to persevere at making hyperliterate music that has complex motives and is densely constructed—relative to the immediate sparkle and shine of mainstream chart music, that is—is an act of bravery, commitment, or lunacy.

The Loud Family debuted on Alias Records in 1993 with Plants and Birds and Rocks and Things, produced by Mitch Easter. The album was later acclaimed by Aimee Mann as "one of the five best records ever made."

From 1991 until Miller's death in 2013, the Loud Family released six studio LPs and one live LP. They were also the subject of a concert video documentary, released on DVD in 2003, that chronicled the group's final concert tour in 2000 in support of the album Attractive Nuisance.

In the 2003 book Sonic Cool: The Life & Death of Rock 'n' Roll, the Loud Family was cited as "perhaps the most sophisticated 'pop' band that ever lived." According to author Joe Harrington, "the songs are beautiful, but they inevitably lampoon some aspect of the culture with biting accuracy. It's the perfect juxtaposition between old/new Pop/Punk that makes The Loud Family simply too good to be true in this day and age."

=== Unreleased works ===
In 2002, Aimee Mann collaborated with Miller on an acoustic album for her SuperEgo label, but it remained unfinished at the time of Miller's death. Miller indicated in late 2003 that he and Mann had "done each other's songs and written one together," and that the project was "halfway through" but "might be on permanent hold." In 2006, Miller stated that he would "love to finish the thing with Aimee Mann, maybe in altered form," stating that he and Mann still discussed the project.

In May 2014, Mann told an interviewer that she and Miller had been trying to make "an acoustic record where we were both singing basically my favorite songs of his, and somehow the hard drive got lost." Mann added that she had "no idea where that record is," and that she had been "really crushed" upon hearing of Miller's death.

=== Posthumous releases ===
==== Reissues on Omnivore Recordings (2014–2020) ====
On July 14, 2014, Omnivore Recordings announced plans to reissue Game Theory's recordings, remastered from the original tapes. Noting that Miller's work with Game Theory had been out of print and "missing for decades," Omnivore stated that it was "pleased to right that audio wrong" with a series of expanded reissues of the group's catalog. The reissue series was produced by Pat Thomas, Dan Vallor (Game Theory's tour manager and sound engineer during the 1980s) and Grammy-winning reissue producer Cheryl Pawelski.

The first in the series, an expanded version of Game Theory's 1982 debut album Blaze of Glory, was released in September 2014 on CD and pink vinyl. The reissue was supplemented with 15 bonus tracks (four from Alternate Learning and 11 previously unissued recordings). Omnivore's November 2014 expanded reissue of Dead Center, on CD only, included material from the Game Theory EPs Pointed Accounts of People You Know (1983) and Distortion (1984), which Omnivore reissued on vinyl only. The reissue of Real Nighttime (1985), the first of Game Theory's albums to be produced by Mitch Easter, was released in March 2015.

In February 2016, nearly 30 years after its initial release, the double album Lolita Nation was remastered and reissued by Omnivore, with 21 bonus tracks that included the previously unreleased full eight-minute version of “Chardonnay," alternate mixes of other album tracks, and live covers of songs by artists such as David Bowie, the Modern Lovers and the Sex Pistols.

After concluding the reissue series with the 2017 reissue of Two Steps from the Middle Ages, Omnivore released the 2020 album Across the Barrier of Sound: PostScript, a collection of mostly previously unreleased songs recorded in 1989 and 1990 by Game Theory's final lineup, which included Miller, Michael Quercio, Gil Ray (now on guitar and keyboards) and Jozef Becker on drums.

==== Supercalifragile (2017) ====
Miller's record label 125 Records revealed after Miller's death in April 2013 that he had made plans to reunite in the summer of 2013 with some of his old bandmates to record a new Game Theory album, Supercalifragile, the band's first since Two Steps from the Middle Ages in 1988.

In September 2015, Miller's wife Kristine Chambers announced that she and Ken Stringfellow had teamed to produce a finished recording from the source material for Supercalifragile that Miller had left behind in various stages of completion, "including fully-formed songs and many other ideas, sketches, lyrics, even musical gestures and snippets of found sound." Additional recording took place at Abbey Road Studios in London in the summer of 2015. A preliminary decision to release the album under Scott Miller's name, using the title I Love You All, was later reconsidered in favor of Miller's original plans for a Game Theory project.

On May 5, 2016, it was announced that the project, now under Miller's planned title Supercalifragile as the sixth and final Game Theory album, would be released in early 2017. A Kickstarter campaign, created to fund the pressing and other expenses involved with completing the album, was fully funded within two weeks.

Participants on Supercalifragile included Mann, who had written in July 2015, "I'm working on this song I wrote with Scott Miller, and hearing him sing it in my headphones is possibly the most devastatingly heartbreaking thing I've ever experienced." Mann's announcement was accompanied by a photo of sheet music bearing the title "No Love".

Other friends and former collaborators whose involvement was announced include Jon Auer of the Posies, Peter Buck of R.E.M., Doug Gillard, Nina Gordon, Scott Kannberg, Ted Leo and Will Sheff. The final contributors also included Matt LeMay, John Moremen and Jonathan Segel. Mitch Easter, Game Theory's former producer, played guitar, drums and synth on the song "Laurel Canyon" and participated in the mixing of the album. A limited first pressing was released in August 2017.

== Cult status and musical legacy ==
=== Critical and commercial reception ===
Miller was long described as a cult favorite with little commercial success, resulting in reviews with such superlatives as "critically acclaimed and quite underrated," "the most criminally unknown songwriter/performer/all-around Rock Genius in America today," "one of America's most underappreciated songwriters", "the most underrated pop genius in music history," and "America's most consistently underrated singer-songwriter ... producing album after album of hook-laden and profoundly literate rock-and-roll."

Rolling Stone, in a 1993 review, suggested that "mostly it's because his songs, though insinuatingly tuneful, can be maddeningly oblique, fleshing out each verse with abstruse references to long-forgotten pop songs and TV shows; at times, the results sound like Thomas Pynchon writing for Big Star."

Rock critic Robert Christgau wrote that "Scott Miller was a prototypical '80s rock artist—serious, playful, skillful, obscure, secondhand." Christgau criticized Miller's musical obsessions and literary obscurities as "rendering the ostensibly public essentially private," adding, "Adepts recommend 1987's Lolita Nation, which is said to make sense, though I don't know exactly what sense." He also offered mild praise for Game Theory's "Mitch Easter-produced albums," which he likened to "dreams of the early dB's ... which isn't to say Miller and cohorts didn't also develop a groove as they got older," referring to Two Steps from the Middle Ages as an "excessive" and "funkier" album that "I kinda like".

In a 1993 interview with Miller, Option wrote that success was a touchy subject for him, quoting Miller's joking example of a typical review: "Nothing good ever happens to Scott Miller, but somehow he's managed to drag his broken body into a studio one more time and make another album." Miller continued that he was "past the point of fighting" discussions of how "arty or brainy" he was, but had hoped for greater emphasis "on what the songs are about—be it the boy-girl situation, or being depressed about some key failure I've had, or getting a little bit of understanding about life." In another 1993 interview, Miller mused:

I don't think I'm in danger of making albums that don't age well, because I haven't ever fit into the times spectacularly well. I've always been aware of myself drawing on a musical vocabulary so broad that a lot of people don't get what I consider to be my real songwriting coups. I think they go right past a lot of people. The bad part of that is I probably won't become a big star. But the good part is that I don't think people will find the albums less useful over time. They'll sound as good in 2004 as they will in 1994.

In 2012, more than a year before Miller's death, The Guardian wrote, "Scott Miller was always a little too out of time for his own good, which means his towering talent is near forgotten," attributing Miller's cult status to the contradictions of "pretty but muscular pop, characterised by a mix of acoustic and electric guitars, by literate but often non-specific lyrics, by keyboard sounds and production techniques that were sometimes unfortunately era-specific, by Miller's sometimes quavering and uncertain voice. Too spiky for the chart kids; too smooth for the alternative kids—the curse of Scott Miller was being only himself, rather than finding a movement or a trend he could be part of."

Miller's own description of his high tenor vocals as a "miserable whine" or "my usual obnoxious vocals" was sometimes repeated by reviewers of his work in Game Theory, who often added balancing comments, such as "while he's fond of referring to his voice as a 'miserable whine,' he sure knows how to make it communicate." In many reviews, Miller's self-deprecation was outweighed by critical praise for his talents in vocal phrasing, inventiveness and musical ambition. Stephin Merritt cited Miller's "swooping melodies, large vocabulary lyrics dense with idiom and metaphor," and "gloriously catchy hooks." According to Pitchfork writer Matt LeMay, Miller "had a singular way of making unexpected and counterintuitive chord changes sound downright inevitable." Music journalist Kent Williams added, "What marks Miller's songs as unique is his obsession with coming up with a perfect, and perfectly new chord progression. Like his hero Alex Chilton, he had a fondness for accessible pop music that had lots of moving parts under the hood. Lyrically, he was both class clown and over-achiever. He wanted words as devious and pretty as the best lyrics of Stephen Sondheim and Jerry Leiber, but shot through with almost Joycean obscurity and puckish humor."

According to professor Stephanie Burt of Harvard University, Miller often wrote "songs about overthinking it, anthems for people who think they think too much and try too hard, who feel at home (if they ever do) only among like-mindedly wordy souls. The tension in Miller's songs—it's never resolved—between guitar-driven pop and keyboard-based New Wave is like the tension between heart and mind, between a nerdy identity never fully embraced and a fear of something more."

After the publication of his book in 2010, Miller's name was cited as "synonymous with thinking people's pop. Pithy, smart and nearly mathy in his mixing of the avant garde with earnest pop precision, he earned his stripes with comparisons to Big Star's Alex Chilton, but surpassed his influences by crafting his own genre of IQ rock, sporting songs with ... increasingly unpredictable-yet-gorgeous arrangements."

=== Musical legacy and influence ===
In 2013, MTV wrote of "Miller's indelible output" and "Game Theory's transcendent tunes" as "his legacy ... ready and waiting for discovery."

Spin wrote that Miller's influence as a songwriter outreached his fame. Miller was credited as an influential force in the 1980s- and 1990s-era music scenes, beginning in Northern California with bands associated with the Paisley Underground genre, and later influencing better-known independent pop artists. In 1996, Aimee Mann stated that "Scott Miller is the best songwriter out there, in my opinion. I often think about that when I'm writing: 'Would Scott think this song is any good?'" adding "Scott's definitely better than me." Mann confirmed more than a decade later, "I was very influenced by Scott Miller's songwriting," and "musically, he was a really big influence."

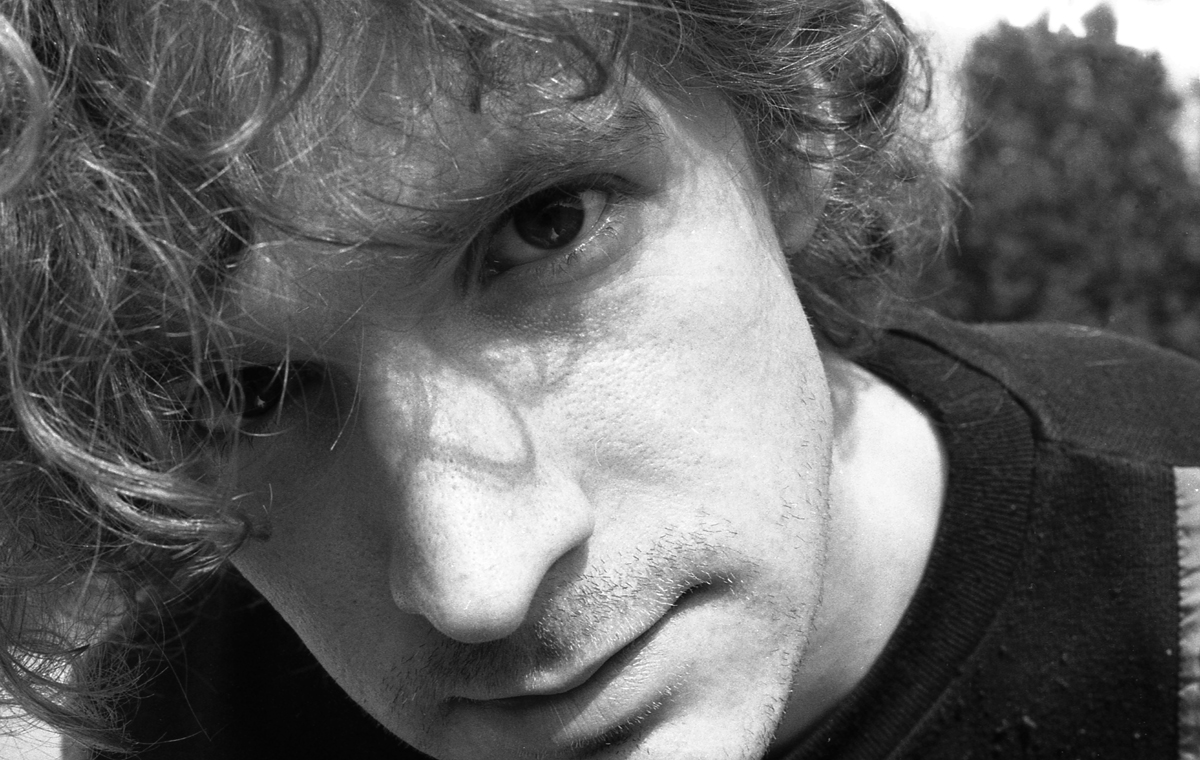
Scott Miller in 1985

According to MTV, Miller's work with Game Theory in the 1980s remained "still visceral and vital" in 2013, "influencing a new generation of indie artists." Significant musicians who have praised Miller's talent and enduring influence on their work include the New Pornographers' leader A.C. Newman, Okkervil River's Will Sheff, Charles Bissell of the Wrens, Doug Gillard and Ted Leo, each of whom performed at a New York City tribute to Miller on June 29, 2013, as well as Veruca Salt's Nina Gordon, the Posies' Ken Stringfellow and Camper Van Beethoven's Jonathan Segel, each of whom appeared on Loud Family albums as guest musicians. Many other artists inspired by Miller's music found greater commercial success than did Miller, such as Jellyfish, Velvet Crush, Matthew Sweet, Ben Folds, Guided by Voices and Michael Penn.

Miller was acknowledged by Irish rock group the Revenants in their 1999 song "Scott Miller Said", which opens by quoting Miller's "Andy in Ten Years" from Lolita Nation. Music critic Nick Kelly, writing for Ireland's largest newspaper, named "Scott Miller Said" as the "greatest ever Irish rock song."

In January 2014, Spin led an article with: "The legacy of Scott Miller, the former Game Theory and The Loud Family power-pop songsmith who died early last year, just got that much more impressive," crediting Miller for bringing Leo to the attention of Mann on the occasion of the release of Mann and Leo's first studio release together as the Both. Their song "Bedtime Stories", which appears on The Both (2014), was written about Miller as an expression of mourning and as "a musical salute... consciously a tribute to him, especially the chord progression of the chorus, which is very, very Loud Family."

A biography by rock critic Brett Milano, Don't All Thank Me at Once: The Lost Genius of Scott Miller, was published in October 2015. Milano described his book as not only telling Miller's story, but also exploring "the college and indie-rock explosion of the 1980s and 1990s" and how some influential artists "managed to fall through the cracks."

== Writing ==
=== Music: What Happened? ===
Music: What Happened?
- Author: Scott Miller
- Genre: Music history and criticism
- Published: December 2010
- Publisher: 125 Records
- Media type: Print (trade paperback)
- Pages: 270 pp. (first edition)
- ISBN: 978-0-615-38196-1
- OCLC: 724510113
- Text: Music: What Happened? online

Scott Miller was the author of Music: What Happened?, a book of music criticism published in 2010, which Billboard called "a well-received critical overview of 53 years of rock history." In second and third editions of the book, Miller's 2010 chapter and 2011 chapter were added.

The book's cover art established a knowledgeable but humorous tone by featuring photographs of Miller in poses that recreated noteworthy album covers such as that of Liz Phair's Exile in Guyville. Thomas Conner of the Chicago Sun-Times wrote that Miller's "encyclopedic knowledge of pop," upon which his music drew, made the book a "shining example of the auteur ideal ... a year-by-year, song-by-song journey from 1957 to this decade, connecting the dots for a macro-perspective on pop."

For each year, Miller wrote about ten or more of his favorite songs, providing analytical insights and placing the songs in context in the musical world of their era. Miller had kept annual countdown lists of his favorite records throughout his life, and his personal project of compiling those lists onto CDs evolved into a formal endeavor to explain what made those songs noteworthy, for what was then the last 50 years of recorded music. The writing process started in 2006 when Miller took a hiatus from music after the release of What If It Works?. Portions of the book were serially published in draft form on Miller's official web site, where Miller responded to fan requests by writing about one year at a time, in random order.

Reacting to the state of pop-music criticism, Miller identified a major issue as critics' failure to "credit an artist with getting a feeling across." Based on past experience as an artist receiving criticism, Miller argued against critics' efforts to maintain journalistic distance or objectivity, suggesting that "acknowledging and respecting readers' stylistic boundaries and keeping their own sentimentality in check" was counterproductive, and hypothesizing that instead, "readers actually want a critic to be their friend by listening through stylistic boundaries with special gold-seeking ears, and reporting how they unexpectedly turned into a love-struck adolescent over a vocal harmony or a piano run... digging the truth of musical experience out from under half-asleep habits of discussing it." Miller further proposed "more music talk in music criticism" and suggested that readers would appreciate "sensitively modest doses" of musical analysis to support a conclusion "that great melody writing occurred or it didn't." For example, Miller noted that critics rarely "identify catchy melodies as specific passages within a song," in the way that working musicians might discuss "the A-minor in the second measure of the chorus."

In response to the book, rock critic Robert Christgau wrote, "The way [Miller] describes the songs he loves... is tremendously suggestive. If only he or some acolyte could spin a worldview around those observations, we might really have something to go on." Musician Stephin Merritt wrote that Miller "manages actual humor (a first in music criticism) and major insights that may change the way you think about, for example, 1967. Almost a new art form." In a book review in Ugly Things magazine, Miller was described as "a sort of fourth-generation rock and roll renaissance man capable of making the printed page jump and sing as deftly as the complex conversations that his Les Paul conducts with a Marshall stack."

=== Ask Scott ===
From 1997 until 2010, Miller periodically wrote on subjects ranging from music to philosophy, theology, physics and poetry in the "Ask Scott" section of his official web site. His initial offer to respond to email questions from fans became for him "a fun exercise" to attempt an honest answer to any question regardless of the level of his expertise.

According to writer Franklin Bruno, Miller's responses were "by turns quick-witted, earnest and appreciative, politely deflecting, and self-deprecating", sometimes openly struggling with "resignation and bitterness about his music career."

== Engineering career ==
Miller attended the University of California, Davis, intending to study art. After switching majors, he graduated with a B.S. in electrical and computer engineering and obtained a full-time job in LISP compiler development at Lucid Inc. with several future Loud Family bandmates. Miller stated in an interview that his employers "let me go whenever I have to do band stuff, which is very big of them." Miller described his job situation as "kind of a carrot in front of me and a boot behind me," acknowledging that his engineering work was highly paid and noting his need to make a living.

After Lucid's dissolution in 1994, Miller was a manager and software developer at Objectivity, where he became director of development and technical publications. From 2011 until his death, Miller was a lead engineer at MarkLogic.

U.S. patent 7,761,475 was issued to Miller on July 20, 2010 as the inventor of a technique for object-oriented database management.

== Personal life and death ==
Miller lived in the San Francisco Bay Area with his wife Kristine and their two daughters. On April 15, 2013, Miller died by suicide at the age of 53. In response to Miller's unexpected death, friends and bandmates established a memorial fund for the education of Miller's children.

== Discography ==
=== With Alternate Learning ===
- ALRN 7-inch EP (1979)
- Painted Windows (1982)

=== With Game Theory ===
- Blaze of Glory (1982)
- Pointed Accounts of People You Know EP (1983)
- Distortion EP (1984)
- Dead Center (1984) – compilation
- Real Nighttime (1985)
- The Big Shot Chronicles (1986)
- Lolita Nation (1987)
- Two Steps from the Middle Ages (1988)
- Tinker to Evers to Chance (1989) – compilation
- Distortion of Glory (1993) – compilation
- Supercalifragile (2017)
- Across the Barrier of Sound: PostScript (2020) – compilation

=== With The Loud Family ===
- Plants and Birds and Rocks and Things (1993)
- Slouching Towards Liverpool EP (1993)
- The Tape of Only Linda (1994)
- Interbabe Concern (1996)
- Days for Days (1998)
- Attractive Nuisance (2000)
- From Ritual to Romance (2002) – live
- What If It Works? (2006) – as The Loud Family and Anton Barbeau
