= Across the Barrier of Sound: PostScript =

Compilation album by Game Theory
- Released: March 20, 2020
- Genre: Power pop, jangle pop
- Label: Omnivore Recordings
- Producer: Dan Vallor

Game Theory chronology
Supercalifragile (2017)	Across the Barrier of Sound: PostScript (2020)

Professional ratings
Review scores
Source	Rating
AllMusic	4/5 stars
Goldmine	A
Rock and Roll Globe	3.5/5 stars
Slant	4/5 stars
Spectrum Culture	4/5 stars

Across the Barrier of Sound: PostScript is a 2020 compilation album consisting of material recorded in 1989 and 1990 by Game Theory, a California power pop band founded in 1982 by guitarist and singer-songwriter Scott Miller. The band's lineup during this period included Michael Quercio, who had previously fronted the Paisley Underground group The Three O'Clock.

The album was released by Omnivore Recordings on March 20, 2020. The collection of mostly previously unreleased songs from Game Theory's final lineup concludes Omnivore's series of Game Theory reissues which began in 2014.

== Track listing ==
All tracks are written by Scott Miller, except as noted

No.	Title	Writer(s)	Length
1.	"All My Loving" (home recording)	John Lennon, Paul McCartney	2:20
2.	"My Free Ride"	Michael Quercio, Scott Miller	3:39
3.	"Go Back to Sleep Little Susie (Aerodeliria)" (home demo)		3:44
4.	"Forget All About It" (home recording)	Todd Rundgren	3:21
5.	"Take Me Down (To Halloo)"		3:08
6.	"The Second Grade Applauds" (home demo)		2:31
7.	"Treat It Like My Own"		2:13
8.	"Inverness"		3:52
9.	"Water" (remix)	Michael Quercio	4:21
10.	"Needle in the Camel's Eye" (home recording)	Brian Eno	2:50
11.	"Idiot Son"		2:29
12.	"Even You" (home demo)		3:19
13.	"The Door Into Summer" (live)	Bill Martin, Chip Douglas	2:56
14.	"Laurel Canyon (Reprise)" (home demo)		1:38

Bonus tracks
No.	Title	Writer(s)	Length
15.	"Jimmy Still Comes Around" (home demo)		4:40
16.	"Rose of Sharon" (remix)		4:18
17.	"Back of a Car" (radio session)	Alex Chilton	2:19
18.	"The Come On" (home demo)	Michael Quercio, Scott Miller	3:17
19.	"A Day in Erotica" (home recording)	Michael Quercio	3:40
20.	"Some Grand Vision" (home demo)		2:53
21.	"Slit My Wrists" (home demo)		2:47
22.	"Idiot Son" (home demo)		4:05
23.	"Sword Swallower" (live)		2:05
24.	"Inverness" (home demo)		4:04
25.	"When She's Alone" (Alternate Learning)		3:17
