= Real Nighttime =

Studio album by Game Theory
- Released: 1985
- Recorded: July 22–31, 1984
- Genres: Power pop, jangle pop
- Length: 45:34 (LP)
- Label: Enigma
- Producer: Mitch Easter

Game Theory chronology
Dead Center (1984)	Real Nighttime (1985)	The Big Shot Chronicles (1986)

Real Nighttime is the second full-length album from Game Theory, a California power pop band founded by guitarist and singer-songwriter Scott Miller. Released in 1985, the album is cited as "a watershed work in '80s paisley underground pop." A 30th anniversary reissue was released in March 2015, on CD and in a limited first pressing on red vinyl, with 13 bonus tracks.

The album was the group's first to be produced by Mitch Easter, who continued as the producer of subsequent Game Theory albums through the rest of the 1980s.

== Background ==
Real Nighttime was the last of Game Theory's albums to be recorded by the band's Davis, California-based line-up, a quartet fronted by Scott Miller on guitar and lead vocals. According to rock critic Mark Deming, "while Miller was clearly the leader of this band, the outstanding percussion work from Dave Gill, the evocative keyboards from Nan Becker, and the solid, propulsive bass of Fred Juhos played an invaluable role in making these songs work."

== Production notes ==
Scott Miller sought out Mitch Easter to produce Real Nighttime after hearing his production work on R.E.M.'s Chronic Town, and Easter went on to have a long association with the group, producing not only the rest of Game Theory's catalog but also the first two albums by Miller's next band, The Loud Family. According to Miller, Easter's main contribution as producer was "competency" and a bigger, more professional sound. In 2003, Miller stated, "I don’t think he and I ever clashed at all.... just suddenly we had someone who knew a lot more than I did and we were all grateful." For his part, when Easter was asked in 1999 about his favorite projects as a producer, Easter named Chronic Town and Game Theory's records, which Easter called "a lot of fun, because of the variety in the way they approached recording."

Mitch Easter later wrote that Game Theory defied the dogmatic "guitar aesthetic" of that era, and it was therefore "an initially disconcerting and ultimately delightful breath of fresh air to arrive at the Game Theory session for Real Nighttime to find an electronic drum kit, somebody's ancient modular synth, and other taboo devices being cheerfully employed by the band, seemingly with no awareness or concern that these were, er, questionable items in the prevailing fashion. This boldness never left." Easter added that he was "inclined to think that Scott was so fantastically and entertainingly aware of the minutia of pop culture that he probably foresaw the latent dangers of using all that ... and charged ahead anyway." Easter credited this to Miller's appreciation of a cyclical "time stamp factor" of hipness becoming dated, and sometimes then "evolving into Genius."

In 1988, Miller told Musician that Real Nighttime "was just sort of out there compared to the records I'd done before, and the one after it", identifying this as the beginning of a pattern of making "alternately down-the-line, then off-the-wall" records.

The album was recorded in Union City, California from July 22 to July 31, 1984, and mixed at the Drive-In Studio in Winston-Salem, North Carolina, from August 15 to August 21, 1984. In addition to producing, Easter was credited as a musician on Real Nighttime, as were future Game Theory members Jozef Becker and Michael Quercio (of The Three O'Clock), both of whom would join Game Theory in 1989.

== Cover art and liner notes ==
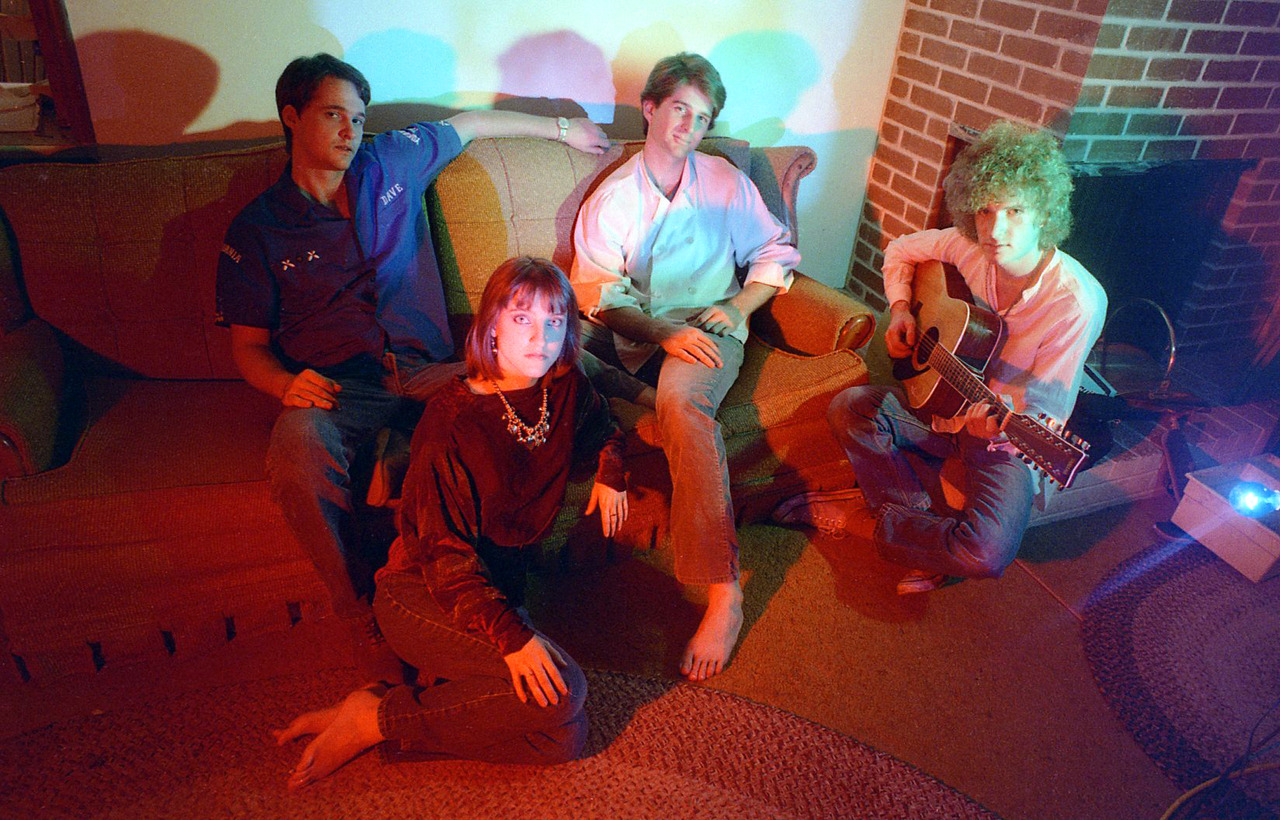
Unused outtake from original 1983 cover shoot for Real Nighttime. L-R: Dave Gill, Nancy Becker, Fred Juhos, Scott Miller.

In response to the band's change in personnel, a photograph of Miller was substituted for a photograph of the full group that had previously been taken for the album's front cover. On the back cover, band members and guest performers were credited equally as "musicians."

The back cover of the LP also featured cryptic liner notes by Miller, written in the style of James Joyce's novel Finnegans Wake. In the 1993 CD reissue on Alias Records, this text was altered from the original, due to an apparent misperception of Miller's Joycean wordplay as spelling errors.

In the 1990s, Miller's Joycean liner notes were the subject of an unofficial project, coordinated at the University of Wisconsin–Milwaukee, to create an annotated edition with analysis of Miller's references.

== Songs and thematic notes ==
Real Nighttime has been called "a virtual concept album about life after college," resulting in "a certain poignancy propelling [its] breathtaking melodies." The album was also described as a "loose song cycle following a young man's journey from romantic bliss ... to soul-crushing disappointment", with comparisons to the Beach Boys' Pet Sounds. According to Miller, the post-collegiate theme was paired with his "intuition that freedom had a strong aspect of being bad news," and that "excessive freedom is typically a formula for trivial and unfaithful pursuit of what passes for personal advantage."

Harvard professor Stephanie Burt wrote in 2011, "Throughout the Game Theory songbook, but especially in Real Nighttime (1985), you can hear an anguished concentration on language and its rules ... and on the complementary rules of pop song construction, as if all those rules—once mastered—could help solve problems of love and sex, of friendship and estrangement, of bodies with feelings that have no clear names."

=== "24" ===
Notwithstanding lyrics by Scott Miller that AllMusic's Stewart Mason labeled as "typically opaque," reviewers have understood the song "24" to clearly be about a "traditional post-collegiate identity crisis."

According to critic Mike Appelstein, writing in the 2005 book Lost in the Grooves, the "eternal question" posed by Miller to himself – "coffee or beer?" – symbolized the poignant dilemma of "finding a specific life direction" after college. While AllMusic's Mark Deming wrote of the "blissful innocence" of the young narrator of "24," Stephanie Burt's analysis found the narrator at the cusp of a quarter-life crisis, as a self-conscious young adult whose mixed feelings established that he "doesn't know where he fits, or to how to live on his own, in a post-collegiate milieu."

Mason wrote that "24" displays "Miller's usual structural quirks" such as "a slowly-building 30-second instrumental intro, an eternity in a song that barely lasts 2:45." With "prolix verses [that] eventually resolve into a simple, straightforward chorus," the song was musically "about as close as Game Theory ever got to Athens-style indie-jangle ... not really that close at all," according to Mason, despite production by Mitch Easter.

On the original album release, "24" faded out to a "puckish" acoustic guitar quote from "Stairway to Heaven," a grace note that was omitted on the Tinker to Evers to Chance compilation.

=== "Curse of the Frontier Land" ===
According to Appelstein, the post-collegiate theme continued with allusions to finding one's own direction and leaving the nest in "Curse of the Frontier Land" ("A year ago we called this a good time").

Miller called the song "a little weirder and more depressing than anything I'd written previously." Miller later described "Curse of the Frontier Land" as containing "really poisonous descriptions" of his reservations about "excessive freedom," also citing "Friend of the Family" as sharing the same viewpoint.

=== "She'll Be a Verb" ===
The phrase "she'll be a verb when you’re a noun," according to Burt, reflects Miller's "anguished concentration on language and its rules," an apparent search by an analytical and systematic mind for a way to understand incomprehensible social relationships.

=== Bonus tracks ===
The original CD release of Real Nighttime on Enigma Records included three bonus tracks, only two of which were recorded by the Real Nighttime line-up. The third bonus track, a cover version of Todd Rundgren's "Couldn't I Just Tell You," was recorded in 1985 by the San Francisco-based line-up of Game Theory for the album The Big Shot Chronicles. In an interview, Miller said the recording "sounded glorious... I was sort of unconscious during the mixing of that; Mitch pretty much did all of it, and I just sort of slept through the performance of it."

In 1993, Alias Records included a previously unreleased song from the Real Nighttime recording sessions ("Faithless," written by Fred Juhos) as a bonus track on a different CD, erroneously placing it on its 1993 CD reissue of The Big Shot Chronicles, rather than on its reissue of Real Nighttime.

The 2015 reissue of Real Nighttime by Omnivore, released on March 17, 2015, omits two cover songs that were bonus tracks on previous CD releases, and instead includes "Faithless," as well as a variety of live tracks from the Real Nighttime tour, and a studio cover of Queen's "Lily of the Valley". The bonus tracks are included on CD and on a download card provided with the reissued vinyl LP.

== Touring ==
The original recording line-up commenced a national tour for Real Nighttime in October 1984, but before the album's 1985 release, the group went through a wholesale change in personnel, with only Miller remaining.

By early 1985, Miller relocated to San Francisco together with future Game Theory member Donnette Thayer, where he assembled a new line-up in the San Francisco Bay Area, featuring Shelley LaFreniere on keyboards, Gil Ray on drums, and Suzi Ziegler on bass. The newly formed San Francisco version of Game Theory began a new tour in 1985 in support of the Real Nighttime album, on which none of them (except Miller) had appeared. During a break in the Real Nighttime tour, this line-up recorded Game Theory's 1986 album, The Big Shot Chronicles.

== Reviews and critical reception ==
Professional ratings
Review scores
Source	Rating
AllMusic	4.5/5 stars

Real Nighttime was well-reviewed, appearing in the Village Voice's annual poll of 1984's best releases. According to rock critic Martin Strong, the album established Game Theory as a "contender in the Paisley Underground power pop stakes."

Music journalist Byron Coley wrote in 1985 that it was "the actual godhead pop LP o' the American Eighties. No shit. This is it." Spin listed Real Nighttime in January 1990 as one of its "80 Excellent Records of the 80s," alongside Coley's description of the album as an "overwhelming swirl of post-Big Star heroin pop."

In 2001's All Music Guide: The Definitive Guide to Popular Music, critic Mark Deming wrote that Real Nighttime showed "Scott Miller was maturing into one of the finest and most distinctive pop songwriters in America." Deming continued, "Always tuneful, and by turns rollicking and heart-breaking, Real Nighttime was the album that announced Game Theory as one of the major talents to emerge from California's Paisley Underground scene."

Trouser Press called the music "tougher and more unpredictable" than related bands such as Let's Active and The Three O'Clock, citing "jagged guitar lines, ominous percussion and noisy sound effects... creating an odd but often productive tension" that undercut pop conventions.

In the book Lost in the Grooves, the album was critically viewed as walking "a fine line between pretension and genius," with the former view supported by Miller's liner notes written in the style of James Joyce's Finnegans Wake, and the latter view supported by "chiming guitars and great pop melodies" described as "breathtaking." The book cited Miller's "brilliant tunesmithing," and identified Real Nighttime as the album in which the group proved themselves capable of fully realizing the "sense of ambition and high concept" suggested in their earlier work.

Film director Andrew Bujalski, in New York Magazine, cited Real Nighttime among his top 20 influences, stating in 2013 that he had been shaken by Scott Miller's then-recent death: "[Miller] had this complex relationship with his lack of fame, but somehow the fact that his bands never made it big seemed like part of why they stayed great. They just did great work for twenty-some years. Lolita Nation is probably their most beloved album, but song for song, I’ll take Real Nighttime over it. He was always bursting with ideas as a songwriter, and it feels absolutely effortless on this record."

According to Deming, in an updated 2015 review for AllMusic, "Game Theory made good records right out of the starting gate, but Real Nighttime was where they proved they could make truly great ones, and it's not just one of the band's finest works, it's a watershed work in '80s paisley underground pop."

In liner notes for the reissue, Byron Coley called the album "a pinnacle of Scott's early days.... For all its surface flash, it's an album that rewards deep listening." Coley expressed his hope that the album would remain in circulation "so youngsters can unravel its beautiful mysteries."

Jersey Beat concluded that in Real Nighttime, "[a]ll the elements were in place for something special to occur – a master songwriter at the height of his powers, a stellar supporting cast and a like minded producer in Mitch Easter to capture it all for posterity. The end result is nothing short of a masterpiece." The reissue was cited as "a real labor of love for all involved" with excellent sound quality and informative packaging.

Reviewing the 2015 reissue, Blurt wrote that "the easy blend of classic and modern gives Real Nighttime a sound that's more timeless than dated," calling the album's sound "fresh then, and timely now, as more modern bands rediscover the synth patches of yesteryear." Examples included the "nearly invisible Simmons drum pads used throughout," as well as "Nan Becker's wacked-out synth licks" in the song "Curse of the Frontier Land," which the reviewer found to "enhance, rather than distract from, its jangly power pop crunch."

== Track listing ==
All tracks are written by Scott Miller, except as noted.

Side One
No.	Title	Length
1.	"Here Comes Everybody"	0:08
2.	"24"	2:54
3.	"Waltz the Halls Always"	2:40
4.	"I Mean It This Time"	3:14
5.	"Friend of the Family"	6:22
6.	"If and When It Falls Apart"	3:48

Side Two
No.	Title	Writer(s)	Length
7.	"Curse of the Frontier Land"		3:33
8.	"Rayon Drive"		1:53
9.	"She'll Be a Verb"		3:37
10.	"Real Nighttime"		3:51
11.	"You Can't Have Me"	Alex Chilton	2:20
12.	"I Turned Her Away"		2:59

1993 CD bonus tracks
No.	Title	Writer(s)	Length
13.	"Any Other Hand"		3:04
14.	"I Want to Hold Your Hand"	John Lennon, Paul McCartney	2:15
15.	"Couldn't I Just Tell You"	Todd Rundgren	2:56

2015 CD bonus tracks
No.	Title	Writer(s)	Length
13.	"Girl w/ a Guitar"	Scott Miller, Michael Quercio
14.	"Any Other Hand"
15.	"Faithless"	Fred Juhos
16.	"Baker Street" (Live)	Gerry Rafferty
17.	"The Red Baron" (Live)
18.	"If and When It Falls Apart" (Live)
19.	"Beach State Rocking" (Live)
20.	"She’ll Be a Verb" (Live)
21.	"Curse of the Frontier Land" (Live)
22.	"Metal and Glass Exact" (Live)
23.	"Girl w/ a Guitar (Complete)" (Live)	Scott Miller, Michael Quercio
24.	"I Turned Her Away" (Live)
25.	"Lily of the Valley"	Freddie Mercury

== Personnel ==
Members:

- Scott Miller – guitar, lead vocals
- Nancy Becker – keyboards, backing vocals, piano (on "24")
- Fred Juhos – bass, backing vocals
- Dave Gill – drums

Guest musicians:

- Michael Quercio – backing vocals
- Mitch Easter – backing vocals, piano (on "Rayon Drive")
- Jon Cowans – E-mu Drumulator (on "She'll Be a Verb")
- Jozef Becker – percussion (on "I Turned Her Away")

On 1993 CD only:

- Gil Ray – drums and backing vocals (on "Couldn't I Just Tell You")
- Shelley LaFreniere – keyboards and backing vocals (on "Couldn't I Just Tell You")
- Suzi Ziegler – bass and backing vocals (on "Couldn't I Just Tell You")

== Release history ==
Date	Region	Label	Format	Catalog
1985	United States	Enigma	LP	72022-1
1985	United States	Enigma	Cassette	72022-4
1985	Netherlands	Enigma	LP	2022-1
1986	United States	Restless	CD	7 72022
1986	Spain	Victoria	LP	VLP-170
1993	United States	Alias	CD	A047D
2015	United States	Omnivore	LP (red vinyl)	OVLP-115
2015	United States	Omnivore	CD	OVCD-115
