= The Big Shot Chronicles =

Studio album by Game Theory
- Released: 1986
- Recorded: September 14–22, 1985
- Studios: Drive-In Studio, Winston-Salem, North Carolina
- Genres: Power pop, jangle pop
- Length: 35:30 (original); 48:40 (with bonus tracks)
- Labels: Enigma Records, Alias Records
- Producer: Mitch Easter

Game Theory chronology
Real Nighttime (1985)	The Big Shot Chronicles (1986)	Lolita Nation (1987)

The Big Shot Chronicles is Game Theory's third full-length album, released in 1986. Produced by Mitch Easter, it was recorded with a new lineup of Game Theory members after leader and songwriter Scott Miller moved the band's base from Davis to San Francisco, California. The album was reissued on September 23, 2016 by Omnivore Recordings as part of the label's series of reissues of the Game Theory catalog.

== Personnel ==
=== Recording personnel ===
By early 1985, all of the original members of Game Theory had left the band, except for Miller. Miller relocated to San Francisco together with future Game Theory member Donnette Thayer. He assembled a new lineup in the San Francisco Bay Area, featuring Shelley LaFreniere on keyboards, Gil Ray on drums and Suzi Ziegler on bass.

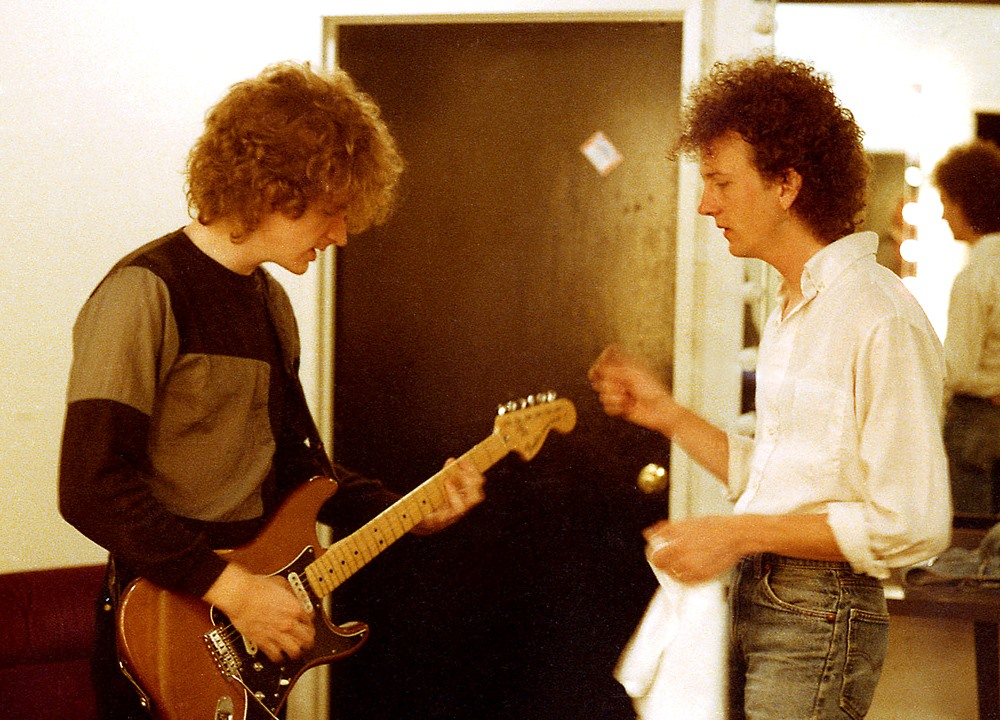
Miller and Gil Ray, prior to first show of new lineup, 1985.

The newly formed version of Game Theory commenced a national tour in 1985 in support of the band's previous album Real Nighttime, an album on which none of the new members had appeared. During a break in the middle of the band's tour for Real Nighttime, this lineup recorded The Big Shot Chronicles.

=== Touring personnel ===
Prior to touring in support of The Big Shot Chronicles in 1986, the group experienced another change of personnel, becoming a five-piece band when Ziegler left the band shortly after the conclusion of the Real Nighttime tour in 1985.

For the 1986 tour, Thayer joined Game Theory as rhythm guitarist and vocalist, and Guillaume Gassuan replaced Ziegler on bass. This lineup remained together to record and tour for two subsequent albums, Lolita Nation (1987) and Two Steps from the Middle Ages (1988).

== Production notes ==
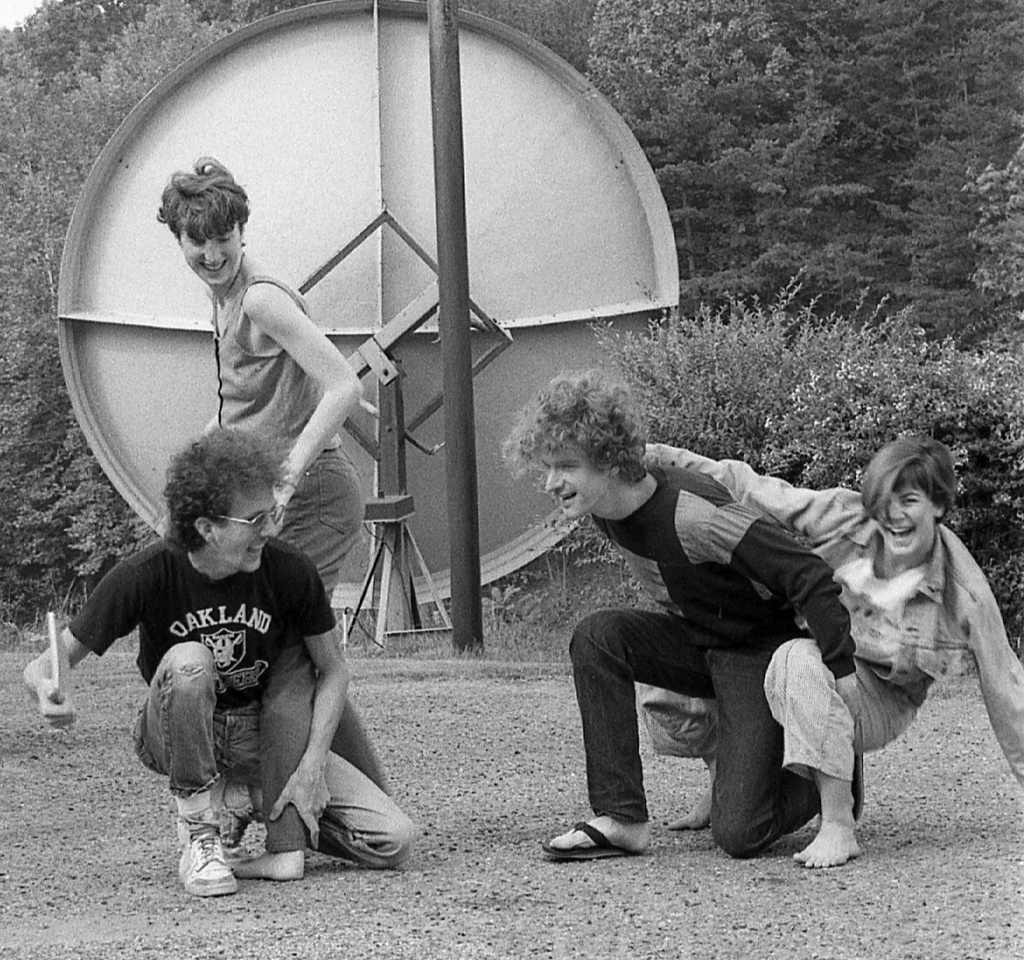
Game Theory, 1985, during break from touring to record The Big Shot Chronicles in Winston-Salem. L-R: Ray, LaFreniere, Miller, Ziegler.

The Big Shot Chronicles, released in 1986, was recorded in September 1985 at Mitch Easter's Drive-In Studio in Winston-Salem, North Carolina. Twenty years after the studio sessions, Miller recalled them as "the most effortless studio experience I've ever had," taking place "in a period of my life when being involved with the music business was surprisingly enjoyable."

In 2001's All Music Guide: The Definitive Guide to Popular Music, critic Mark Deming wrote, "Mitch Easter's production guides the record through moody neo-psychedelia and up-tempo hard pop with an equally sure hand; the record sounds just as good as the band plays." According to John Borack, Easter did "his usual Herculean job behind the console, getting great guitar sounds whether they be gritty and electric ... or softer and acoustic."

In an October 1986 interview, Miller discussed Mitch Easter's role as producer:

He helps from the technical end, not from the artistic end. He doesn't say, "You're going to need a lot of backing vocals here" or "Use this guitar on this." I usually do most of that stuff. I'd say I end up doing half of the production myself. He does pretty much all of the engineering and some of the things you'd call production. Like he decides where you stand when you do the vocals, and you know, "We're going to have a nylon stocking between you and the microphone," some tricks like that. He'll do things like say "No, that vocal track wasn't good, let's do it again." He makes a lot of quality decisions, he sort of figures out what we want and has in his head what he thinks a good pop record's gonna be and works toward that. Also, he knows how to use all his equipment precisely and utterly.

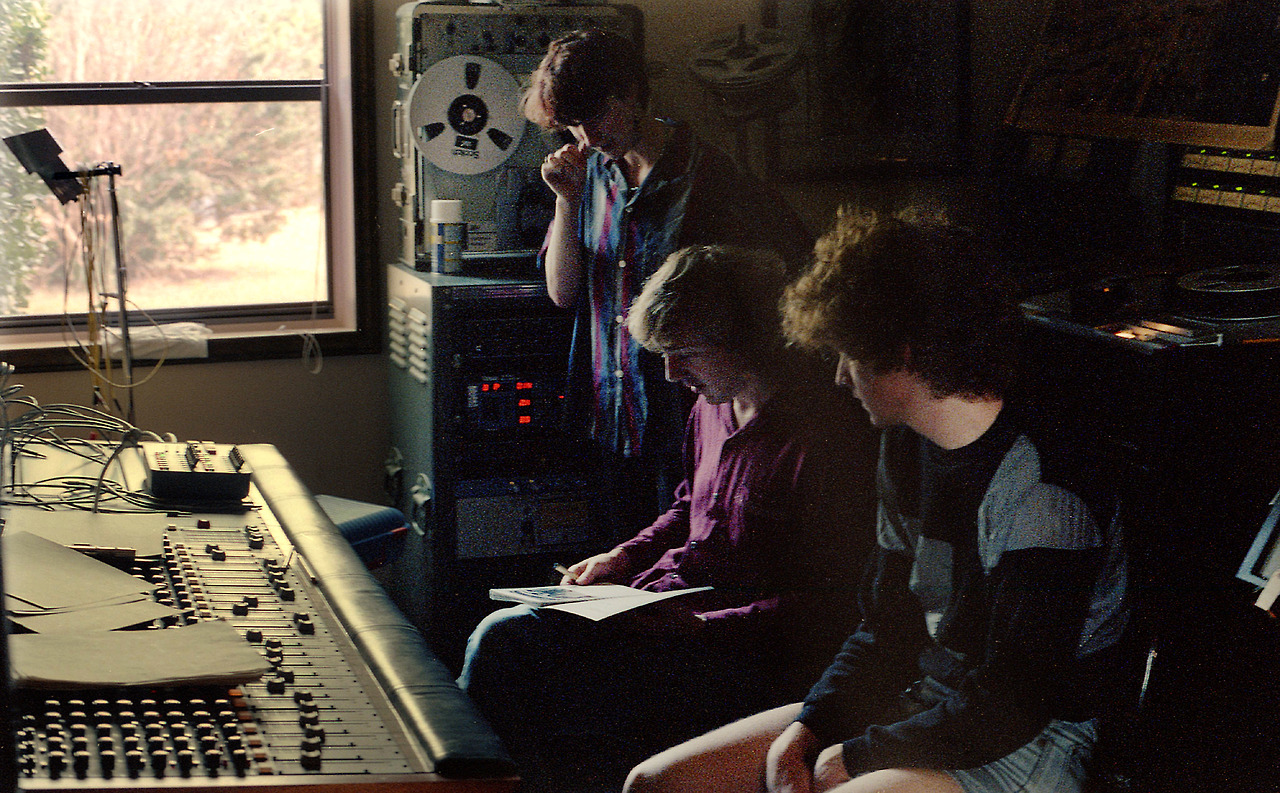
Recording The Big Shot Chronicles, September 1985. L-R: LaFreniere, Easter, Miller.

Miller added, "Mitch and I are real historians, we're both really into 70s rock. The song 'I've Tried Subtlety,' I said, 'I want a drum sound just like Low by David Bowie,' so we kind of went for that." Referring to the song "Like a Girl Jesus," Miller later recalled that "even the spacey sounding instruments" were recorded in one take."

== Songs and thematic notes ==
According to Robert Ham of Paste Magazine, "the sound of Big Shot is big, brash, and purposeful."

In addition to the double meaning of "big shot" (either an important person or a shot at fame and success), the title of the album was a reference to Big Shot Photo Lab, a Berkeley business where band photographer Robert Toren had secured rehearsal space for the group. According to Trouser Press, the title also paraphrases John Cheever's The Wapshot Chronicle.

In 2008, Scott Miller wrote that "most of the lyrics on [this] album came from dreams I'd had."

Harvard professor Stephanie Burt, analyzing themes of social awkwardness in Miller's work, recalled Miller's dismissal of his own early songs as "young adult hurt-feeling-a-thons," and argued, "The Big Shot Chronicles had its share of hurt feelings, but the album also shows emotional range: exultantly happy, regretful, resentful, worshipful, confused, or hurried, or all these at once ... One emotion is missing: never does Miller sing about anger at anyone besides himself. Nerd passion, instead, becomes nerd passive-aggression, barbed puns and pulled punches."

In a January 1988 interview, Miller called the album "the happiest of the last few," adding "It seems like Real Nighttime and Lolita Nation both have this real chip on their shoulders." In Miller's opinion, "Big Shot is a better record than Real Nighttime, much better."

=== "I've Tried Subtlety" ===
According to Burt, this song "follows a fragile promise, or a premise, not unique to nerds: that the gang of kids with whom you might belong, who share your tastes and habits, can make whatever you like stay with you for good." Burt wrote that the song

follows a party run by "MIT-grad alleycats with time on their hands," at the Victoria Hotel (a real hotel in Berkeley) to which "all the kids from 916" (Sacramento and Davis) show up; Miller has joined them, but can’t seem to join in their fun—he may be too old, or too lovelorn, or too self-conscious. "Gifted children link your arms in rhyme," the last verse implores, as the big guitar rises beneath it: "better make this world while still it gives you time." Pounding along, for a while, like any teen anthem, "I've Tried Subtlety" works so memorably as a song because it fails as a call to arms: each verse, each break, goes on a measure longer than we expect, as if to accommodate second thoughts.

Former Game Theory member Fred Juhos filmed an unofficial video for "I've Tried Subtlety" with the 1986 five-piece lineup of the group.

=== "Erica's Word" ===
"Erica's Word"

Single by Game Theory

from the album The Big Shot Chronicles
- Released: November 1986
- Length: 3:54
- Label: Enigma Records, Big Time
- Songwriter: Scott Miller
- Producer: Mitch Easter

Music video
- "Erica's Word" on YouTube

"Erica's Word," regarded as the best-known track on The Big Shot Chronicles, was released as a single and became Game Theory's first official music video. Commissioned by Enigma Records, the video featured the band's 1986 five-person lineup and was directed by Jan Novello, with art direction by Modi Karlsson. The video received airplay on MTV's 120 Minutes and contributed to the song's durability as "a popular college radio track for years."

AllMusic's Stewart Mason wrote that "the super-catchy melody and Mitch Easter's crisp production" made it "ear candy for eggheads." The song has been variously described as "sunny", "soaring," or "restrained"; but according to Mason, "The moment in the final verse where Miller sweetly sings 'Girl, I hope it comes through for you in the clutch' and adds a teasing extra bar before spitting out a snotty 'But I won't bet much!' and swinging into the final chorus is one of those perfect little moments power pop fans savor like truffles."

Assessing the song's popularity, Mason wrote:

If Game Theory was ever going to have a hit single, it would have been 1986's "Erica's Word." It did get them closer than any of their other songs ... but although the song has a strikingly memorable tune and a killer singalong chorus, accented by ideal little production touches like the slow instrumental build-up of the intro, acoustic rhythm guitars, expertly deployed handclaps and fuzzboxes, plus bassist Suzi Ziegler and keyboardist Shelley LaFreniere's chirpy backing vocals, it's still unlikely that a song with an opening line like "Erica's gone shy/Some unknown X behind the [why]" is going to burn up the charts. People don't like to be reminded of algebra in their nice little pop songs.

According to Stephanie Burt's scholarly analysis, Miller's algebra "joins up with physics ... mass not conserving in the old way" to yield energy, Burt speculated, in a song that was "energetic indeed, the should-have-been breakthrough hit" that "even has a conventional video — the band mimes the song, and Miller tosses his hair." In Burt's reading of the song, Miller seemed "almost happy to be so frustrated, since it gives him a reason to sing; he sounds even happier to be led, or misled, by the charismatic Erica, whom he says he has known since high school, when they were photographed in her car, going nowhere."

=== "Regenisraen" ===
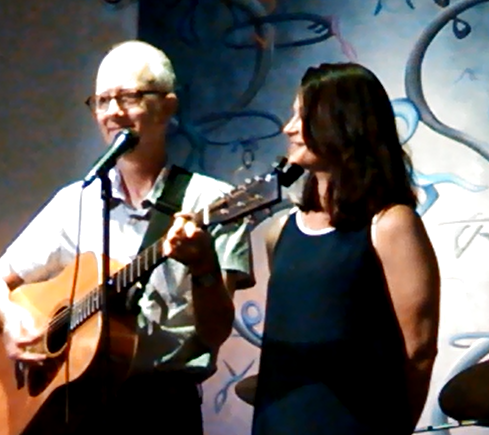
Gil Ray and Suzi Ziegler performing "Regenisraen" during a July 2013 Scott Miller memorial tribute.

The title of the song "Regenisraen" sprang from Miller's attempt at "a sort of Jabberwocky speech meant to communicate a dreaming state," influenced by reading James Joyce's novel Finnegans Wake. The title was a portmanteau word that Miller explained as a combination of "regeneration; crossed with the word Israel, which is a sort of symbol of the beginning of religion, Judeo-Christian tradition; and the word rain, just as a symbol of recurrent events, a cycle of nature. It all adds up to a word which to me means a sort of faith in regeneration after death, a hope that things will get brighter before the dawn, a song about depending on that kind of cyclical hope." Miller later wrote, "I suppose my intention was to conjure up the feeling of finding yourself in need of spiritual renewal."

=== "Crash Into June" ===
"Crash Into June," according to Miller in 2007, was "about coming to terms with impulses toward nostalgia, and how that involves a feeling that the good times, such as they are, are necessarily hurtling past and can't be latched onto." Miller added that he was convinced that the song was "a failed piece of writing as we were working it up," resulting in "a strange grudge against it" that later softened.

=== "Never Mind" ===
"Never Mind," according to Burt, was a song of "pulled punches," bringing out tensions of a relationship in the repeated line: "The things I do for you girl, I ... never mind." Analyzing the line's multiple possible meanings, Burt found, "(a) 'I never object inwardly to all the things I do for you,' (b) 'I never pay attention to what I do for you (serving you has become my second nature),' and (c) 'I expect you to pay appropriate attention to what I do for you (but I know you won't, so forget I brought it up).' Can they go on like that forever?"

=== "Like a Girl Jesus" ===
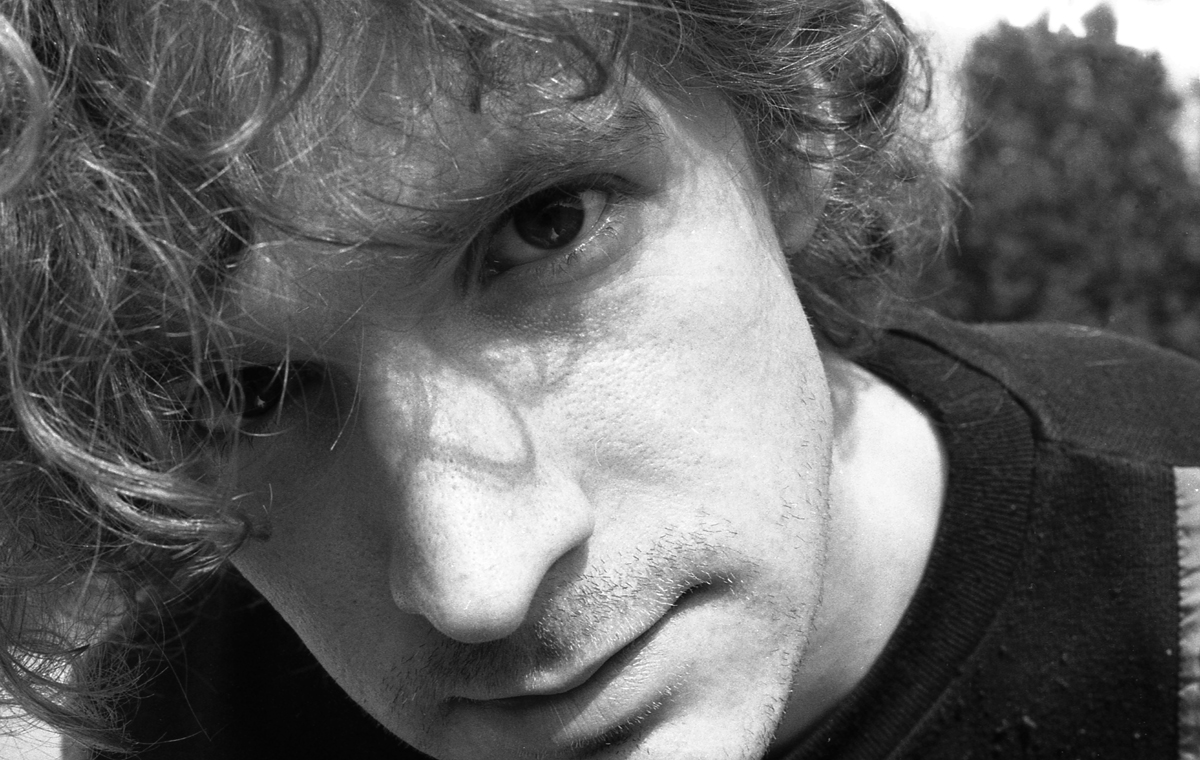
Scott Miller, 1985, from cover shoot for Game Theory LP The Big Shot Chronicles. (Photo: Robert Toren)

Calling the song "a marvelously oblique closer" to the album, Mason wrote:

"Like a Girl Jesus" starts as a nearly solo performance, just Scott Miller's hushed vocals and electric guitar against a backdrop of Suzi Ziegler's almost subliminal bass part and occasional random keyboard and percussion sounds. The tension builds throughout the song, Miller's vocals getting closer to a Chris Bell strangled whine than at any other point in his career, until, with less than a minute to go, drummer Gil Ray and keyboardist Shelley LaFreniere finally burst in to drive the song home '70s-prog-ballad style, complete with busy tom-tom rolls and a seemingly tongue-in-cheek bombastic quality.

In Stephanie Burt's analysis, the song was "true to Miller's cerebral innocence," with its mathematical reference in the line "Like a girl Jesus, she's undefined." According to Burt, "Miller's melisma, sliding four notes into the long 'i' in 'undefined,' gives listeners time to pursue double meanings: (1) the boy doesn't know what the girl is really like (since he worships her), (2) some operations—division by zero, for instance, or his dating her—cannot take place in a given system of rules."

Miller recalled that the recording of the instrument parts "was all one take stuff," and added, "I wrote the song almost instantly, too; I distinctly remember my intent was to get it put out as a flexi disk in Bucketfull of Brains magazine."

According to Mason, the song became a "beloved Game Theory classic – and one of the few to get covered, by both Sleepyhead and the Killjoys."

=== CD bonus tracks ===
==== "Girl w/ a Guitar" ====
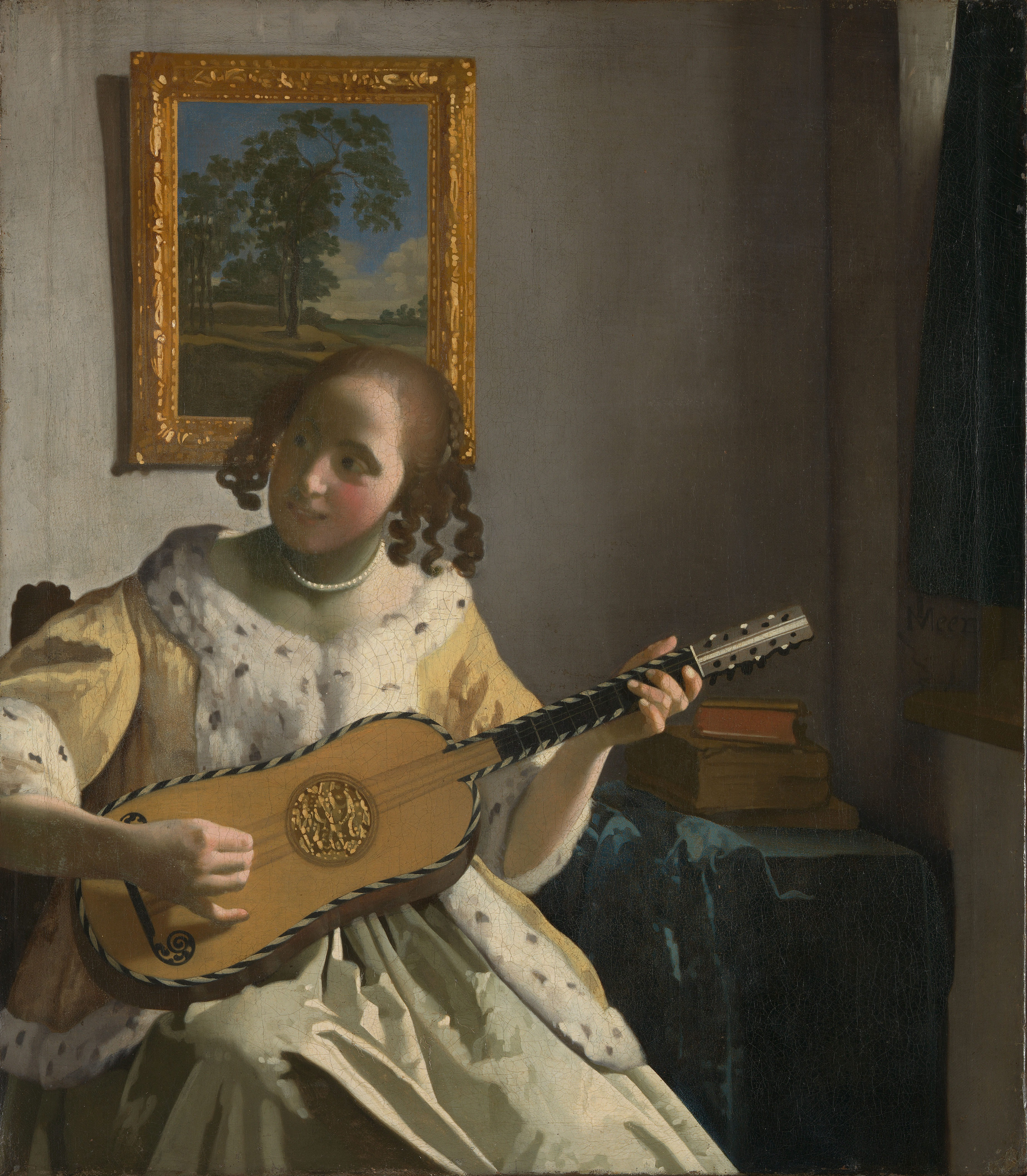
The Guitar Player by Vermeer

The song's title alluded to a Jan Vermeer painting, The Guitar Player (1672), and was also inspired by Susanna Hoffs of the Bangles. The lyrics include a reference to artist Henri Rousseau, among other influences of Miller's early university education as an art major.

Under the title "The Girl with the Guitar (Says Oh Yeah)," this song was first released by the Three O'Clock, appearing on their 1985 album Arrive Without Travelling. On that album, the song was credited to Miller and Michael Quercio, who contributed the middle portion (bridge and lyrics). An earlier demo version appeared on the Three O'Clock's compilations The Hidden World Revealed (2013) and Aquarius Andromeda (2014).

==== "Faithless" ====
"Faithless," written by Fred Juhos, was a song from the 1984 Real Nighttime recording sessions and was recorded by the 1984 Davis-based lineup of Game Theory. The Big Shot Chronicles included it as a bonus track in an apparent effort by Alias Records to balance an error made on the CD release of Real Nighttime (originally by Enigma Records).

==== "Couldn't I Just Tell You" ====
Game Theory's cover version of Todd Rundgren's "Couldn't I Just Tell You", recorded in 1985 during the same sessions as The Big Shot Chronicles, appeared as a bonus track on the 1993 CD release of Real Nighttime rather than on the contemporaneous CD of The Big Shot Chronicles. In an interview, Miller said the recording "sounded glorious... I was sort of unconscious during the mixing of that; Mitch pretty much did all of it, and I just sort of slept through the performance of it." He further noted, prior to the 1993 CD release, the rarity of the recording:

[I]t took me two years to obtain a copy of it because it was released in Australia. What happened was Enigma sold the [Australian] rights to Game Theory to Big Time Records and then apparently pulled out of the deal right when they were going to release the record or something really awful like that. So Big Time just pressed up Big Shot Chronicles ... and this single with "Erica's Word" backed with "Couldn't I Just Tell You." We wanted to give them something that wasn't available on the record. So there were 100 copies made, or something like that, and all pulled [from release].

== Critical response and legacy ==
Professional ratings
Review scores
Source	Rating
AllMusic	4.5/5 stars
The Encyclopedia of Popular Music	3/5 stars
MusicHound Rock	4/5
Philadelphia Inquirer	4/4 stars

Spin wrote in 1987 that the album, distributed through Capitol Records, sold more copies in its first few weeks of release than had all of Game Theory's previous records combined. In the end, however, the release was "surprisingly passed over by the buying public."

Spin likened The Big Shot Chronicles to Real Nighttime, calling both albums "a rare commodity... a pop record that can actually make you laugh and cry and squirm all at once." The Big Shot Chronicles was distinguished as "harsh, dense, and metallic-sounding," and "damned ambitious as pop fare goes nowadays, with difficult time signatures, criss-cross rhythms, off-beat chordings, and surreal, vertiginous lyrics."

Billboard mentioned the album's "crisp, moody pop songs," taking note of Miller's high tenor vocals "sung in a self-described 'miserable whine'", and adding that Mitch Easter lent "an assured production touch" to this "collegiate fave."

Among college audiences, a contemporaneous review pointed to the band's originality in a genre "so codified that a little change in tradition is apocalyptic," citing the band's experimental notes as quirky and bizarre, yet "such loving care is taken with the obvious influences that you appreciate the music for simply reaffirming everything that's right about pop. It's one of the most important reasons for liking Game Theory, because any band with good taste is worth saving from obscurity."

Trouser Press wrote that the new lineup "lights the afterburners for aggressively electric pop, louder and more powerful than anything in Game Theory's past."

Critic Mark Deming called the album a "superb set from one of the best (and most underappreciated) bands of the 1980s," who were "equally adept at flexing their muscles ... or easing into a song's subtleties." Deming praised Miller's growth as a songwriter, citing the songs "Erica's Word" and "Don't Look Too Closely" as "smart pop heaven on Earth."

The Chicago Reader labeled the album "ambitious and elaborate ... packed with sunny, ultracatchy melodies, sweet vocal harmonies, and soft-focus psychedelia." Music writer Peter Margasak praised its "songs distinguished by unexpected twists and turns" and "lyrics riddled with nerdy wordplay."

In the 2007 book Shake Some Action: The Ultimate Power Pop Guide, The Big Shot Chronicles was ranked #16 on a list of the top 200 power-pop albums of all time. The reviewer noted, "Nowhere are Miller's eccentricities more consistently tuneful and genius-like than on The Big Shot Chronicles," citing the song "Regenisraen" as "absolutely gorgeous, hymn-like," among other "top-shelfers."

In 2013, "Erica's Word" was played during a Boston Red Sox game by Fenway Park organist Josh Kantor, and a cover of "The Only Lesson Learned" was recorded by Matt LeMay, a New York musician and senior writer for Pitchfork.

In 2016, Robert Ham of Paste Magazine said: "Miller’s silver-tongued wordplay and giddy wit dances through it all, revealing that there is still life left in the love song and the angst-ridden ballad." The publication named the album as the 43rd-best post-punk release of all time.

== Track listing ==
All tracks are written by Scott Miller, except as noted.

No.	Title	Length
1.	"Here It Is Tomorrow"	2:17
2.	"Where You Going Northern"	3:01
3.	"I´ve Tried Subtlety"	4:31
4.	"Erica's Word"	3:54
5.	"Make Any Vows"	2:19
6.	"Regenisraen"	3:30
7.	"Crash Into June"	2:57
8.	"Book of Millionaires"	2:21
9.	"The Only Lesson Learned"	2:18
10.	"Too Closely"	3:19
11.	"Never Mind"	2:52
12.	"Like a Girl Jesus"	2:37

CD bonus tracks
No.	Title	Writer(s)	Length
13.	"Girl w/ a Guitar"		2:17
14.	"Come Home with Me"		2:43
15.	"Seattle"	Ernie Sheldon, Hugo Montenegro, Jack Keller	2:24
16.	"Linus and Lucy"	Vince Guaraldi	1:48
17.	"Faithless"	Fred Juhos	3:31

== Various artist compilations ==
Year	Title	Format	Label
1987	Enigma Variations 2: includes "Erica's Word"	LP, CS, CD	Enigma
1987	The Enigma Compilation 1988: includes "Erica's Word"	LP	Enigma
1989	Enigma! A Manic Assemblage of Enigma Recording Artists: includes "Erica's Word"	CS	Enigma
1993	Alias w/ a Bullet: includes "Erica's Word," "Girl w/ a Guitar," "Linus and Lucy"	CD	Alias
1997	The Year of the Wagon: includes "Erica's Word"	CD	Alias (A124)
