= Hex (Hex album) =

Studio album by Hex
- Released: 1989
- Genre: Indie pop, new wave
- Length: 40:56
- Label: First Warning, Rykodisc, Demon (UK)
- Producer: Steve Kilbey

Hex
Review scores
| Source | Rating |
|---|---|
| AllMusic | 3/5 stars |

Hex is the 1989 self-titled debut album by indie pop band Hex, a duo formed by guitarist, songwriter, and lead vocalist Donnette Thayer, previously of Game Theory, and Steve Kilbey of Australian psychedelic rock band The Church.

== Background ==
Prior to forming the band Hex, Donnette Thayer had been a member of the power pop/college rock band Game Theory, led by Scott Miller. Thayer appeared on Game Theory's cult classic double album Lolita Nation (1987), and on their subsequent album, Two Steps from the Middle Ages (1988).

In 1988, following a promotional tour for the release of Two Steps, Thayer left Game Theory to team up with Steve Kilbey as a duo called Hex. Kilbey and Thayer were romantically involved at the time – Kilbey's nickname for Thayer was "Starfish," which became the title of The Church's album Starfish. Starfish featured the single "Under The Milky Way," a Top Ten hit for The Church which was No. 12 for the year 1988.

Hex, the 1989 self-titled debut album by the new duo, was originally released on First Warning, then on Rykodisc. Kilbey's biographer has described this collaboration as "one of the most inspired and artistically rewarding collaborations of Steve's career. The arrangements for many of the songs were spare – often consisting of softly strummed acoustic guitars, ambient keyboard textures, and tasteful electronic percussion – which allowed her voice to float up through the wide open spaces like smoke."

== Critical reception ==
According to AllMusic critic Ned Raggett, the debut album "somehow gets the mood right from the start, that lovely end-of-the-'80s psych-pop/indie or whatever groove that had defined much of the underground music of that era." Raggett called it "lovely to hear how well they go together, Thayer's voice just tripped out and intoxicating enough, Kilbey's arrangements suiting the mood well," noting that other than a guest drummer on one track, "the two create everything themselves and do a lovely job", creating a "rainy/sunny rural-afternoon glaze throughout Hex, a wonderful way to spend some time with music."

== Track listing ==
| No. | Title | Writer(s) | Length |
|---|---|---|---|
| 1. | "Diviner" | Kilbey, Thayer | 4:45 |
| 2. | "Hermaphrodite" | S. Kilbey | 2:17 |
| 3. | "Ethereal Message" | Kilbey, Thayer | 5:45 |
| 4. | "Mercury Towers" | Kilbey, Thayer | 5:06 |
| 5. | "Out of the Pink Sky" | S. Kilbey | 2:51 |
| 6. | "Fire Island" | Kilbey, Thayer | 5:14 |
| 7. | "In the Net" | Kilbey, Thayer | 6:46 |
| 8. | "Silvermine" | S. Kilbey | 2:12 |
| 9. | "Elizabeth Green" | Kilbey, Thayer | 5:13 |
| 10. | "An Arrangement" | S. Kilbey | 1:12 |
