= Dead Center (Game Theory album) =

Compilation album by Game Theory
- Released: 1984, 2014
- Genre: Power pop, new wave
- Length: 36:37 (LP); 1:19:17 (CD)
- Label: Lolita (1984); Omnivore (2014)
- Producer: Michael Quercio; Scott Miller

Game Theory chronology
Distortion (1984)	Dead Center (1984)	Real Nighttime (1985)

Alternative cover
- Dead Center (2014 reissue)

Dead Center is a compilation album from Game Theory, a California power pop band fronted by guitarist and singer-songwriter Scott Miller. Initially released in France on Lolita Records in 1984, a newly remastered version was released on CD on November 24, 2014, on Omnivore Recordings.

== Background ==
By mid-1982, Scott Miller had assembled the first iteration of Game Theory, which consisted of Miller (lead guitar, vocals), Nancy Becker (keyboards, vocals), Fred Juhos (bass, guitar, vocals), and Michael Irwin (drums). The first Game Theory album was the Blaze of Glory LP, released on Rational Records in 1982.

With Dave Gill replacing Michael Irwin on drums, two 12-inch EPs followed. In 1983, the group released the six-song EP Pointed Accounts of People You Know, recorded at Samurai Sound Studio, which was co-owned by Gill. The group then recorded the five-song Distortion EP in December 1983 (released 1984), with The Three O'Clock's Michael Quercio producing.

== Flexidisc ==
A long version of the song "Dead Center," a rare promotional single, was recorded in 1983 as a 7-inch flexidisc for distribution with the music magazine Option, and appeared on the 1993 Alias Records compilation CD Distortion of Glory. This version of the song included an introductory portion that featured, over instrumental music, layers of Scott Miller's spoken responses to an interviewer's unheard questions. It appears as a bonus track on the 2014 CD reissue of Dead Center.

Omnivore Recordings obtained 300 of the original flexidiscs, and announced a plan to distribute them as a bonus to 300 pre-release purchasers of their March 2015 vinyl reissue of Game Theory's 1985 Real Nighttime LP.

== Production notes ==
=== Original LP (1984) ===
In 1984, the Dead Center LP was released in France, on the Lolita label. The French release of Dead Center was a compilation of selected tracks from Game Theory's Pointed Accounts of People You Know and Distortion EPs.

The French release included two additional tracks: the group's cover of "The Letter" (a 1967 hit for the Box Tops with Alex Chilton's vocals), and a shorter version of the song "Dead Center" with different lyrics and no spoken-word interview.

=== CD reissue (2014) ===
In 2014, Omnivore announced its commitment to reissue Game Theory's recordings, remastered from the original tapes by co-producer Dan Vallor, who was Game Theory's tour manager and sound engineer during the 1980s. The remastered version of Dead Center was released on November 24, 2014, as Omnivore's omnibus CD release encompassing material from the Pointed Accounts of People You Know EP and the Distortion EP. At the request of Fred Juhos, the CD of Dead Center omitted three songs written by Juhos that appeared on the two EPs. "The Letter" and both versions of the song "Dead Center" were included on the CD.

The release of Dead Center on CD and for digital download, but not on vinyl, was followed on November 28 by limited-edition Black Friday Record Store Day releases of the two EPs on colored 10-inch vinyl. The Pointed Accounts and Distortion EP releases included digital download cards.

Describing the bonus tracks on the 2014 reissue, Wilfully Obscure wrote, "There's a lo-fi acoustic run-through of Badfinger's 'No Matter What,' and ... Van Morrison's "Gloria" and Bryan Ferry's "Mother of Pearl" also get the in-concert Game Theory treatment."

The bonus tracks also include Miller's first performance of an audience-requested live cover of R.E.M.'s "Radio Free Europe," after taking only a few seconds to work out the chords before launching into a solo rendition. According to drummer Gil Ray, "Either Buck or Stipe told Scott Miller in our band the real words to 'Radio Free Europe' and every now and then we'd do it as a cover because Scott knew the words. It was a big deal to know the words to any of their songs."

== Critical reception ==
Professional ratings
Review scores
Source	Rating
AllMusic	3.5/5 stars
Blurt	4/5 stars

According to Blurt, "While no striking developmental steps get taken here, leader Scott Miller sharpens his songsmithery, even as his lyrics get more abstract, and the band likewise tightens its grip on its power popping psychedelic new wave. Like a college rock top 40 machine, GT effortlessly sets 'em up and knocks 'em down." Of the reissue, Blurt added, "Nicely enhanced, Omnivore," noting that the bonus tracks added up to "another LP's worth of tracks, both demos and live versions of album cuts and a passel of covers that pay tribute to Miller's dedicated fandom."

Popshifter wrote, "As with its other reissues, Omnivore hit it out of the park with the beautiful digipak and comprehensive liner notes (including a very sweet remembrance from Michael Quercio, one of Miller's key collaborators)."

Critic Jeff Elbel, writing in Illinois Entertainer, called the reissue a "thorough reintroduction to Game Theory's sophomore efforts and Miller's developing acumen as a sharp and witty observer. The eight EP tracks may not represent Miller's peak, but they include must-have gems like the cautiously hopeful 'Penny, Things Won't' and sinewy 'Shark Pretty.'" Elbel praised Miller's version of "Radio Free Europe" as "a telling and fearlessly off-the-cuff live cover," which another reviewer noted that Miller "manages to pull off adeptly."

== Track listing ==
=== Original LP (1984) ===
All tracks are written by Scott Miller, except as noted.

Side One
No.	Title	Writer(s)	Length
1.	"Nine Lives to Rigel Five"		2:42
2.	"Penny, Things Won't"		5:16
3.	"Dead Center"		3:55
4.	"The Red Baron"		3:34
5.	"The Letter"	Wayne Carson	2:02

Side Two
No.	Title	Writer(s)	Length
6.	"Shark Pretty"		3:55
7.	"Metal and Glass Exact"		3:33
8.	"Selfish Again"		4:08
9.	"Too Late for Tears"		3:42
10.	"37th Day"	Fred Juhos	3:49

=== CD reissue (2014) ===
All tracks are written by Scott Miller, except as noted.

No.	Title	Writer(s)	Length
1.	"Nine Lives to Rigel Five"		2:46
2.	"Penny, Things Won't"		5:21
3.	"Dead Center" (French LP version)		3:58
4.	"The Red Baron"		3:39
5.	"The Letter"	Wayne Carson	2:06
6.	"Shark Pretty"		4:01
7.	"Metal and Glass Exact"		3:39
8.	"Selfish Again"		4:12
9.	"Too Late for Tears"		3:43
10.	"Life in July"	Scott Miller, Nancy Becker	2:41
11.	"No Matter What" (demo)	Pete Ham	2:52
12.	"Mother of Pearl" (live)	Bryan Ferry	4:29
13.	"Nine Lives to Rigel Five" (live)		2:25
14.	"Trouble" (live)	Cat Stevens	2:54
15.	"Shark Pretty" (live)		4:03
16.	"Gloria" (live)	Van Morrison	3:41
17.	"Too Late for Tears" (Michael Quercio's "George Martin" rough mix)		3:47
18.	"Radio Free Europe" (live)	Bill Berry, Michael Stipe, Mike Mills, Peter Buck	4:12
19.	"Penny, Things Won't" (live)		5:15
20.	"Say It Ain't So Joe" (radio session)	Murray Head	4:02
21.	"Dead Center" (flexi disc version)		6:05

== Personnel ==
=== Members ===
- Scott Miller – guitar, lead and backing vocals
- Dave Gill – drums
- Fred Juhos – bass
- Nancy Becker – keyboards, backing vocals

=== Original LP (1984) ===
==== Guest musicians ====
- Michael Quercio – additional backing vocals
- Earl Slick (credited as Ernie Smith) – guitar solo on "Shark Pretty"
- Dave Scott Millington – keyboards on "37th Day"

==== Production ====
- Scott Miller – producer (tracks 2, 3, 5, 7, 8, 10)
- Michael Quercio – producer (tracks 1, 4, 6, 9)
- Dave Scott Millington – engineer
- Dave Gill – co-engineer (tracks 1, 4, 6, 9)
- Jeff Sanders – original mastering

=== CD reissue (2014) ===
==== Performance ====
- Scott Miller – guitar, lead and backing vocals
- Fred Juhos – bass, guitar, backing vocals
- Nan Becker – keyboards, backing vocals, lead vocals on track 10
- Dave Gill – drums
- Michael Quercio – additional backing vocals
- Earl Slick – guitar solo on "Shark Pretty"
- Gil Ray – drums (tracks 12, 15)
- Shelley LaFreniere – keyboard, backing vocals (tracks 12, 15)
- Suzi Ziegler – bass, backing vocals (tracks 12, 15)

==== Production ====
- Michael Quercio – producer (tracks 1, 4, 6, 9, 17), liner notes
- Scott Miller – producer (tracks 2, 3, 5, 7, 8, 10)
- Dan Vallor – reissue producer, recording engineer (tracks 12–16, 18–20), mixing (track 11), liner notes
- Pat Thomas – reissue producer
- Cheryl Pawelski – reissue producer
- Dave Scott Millington – engineer (tracks 1–10, 17)
- Gavin Lurssen and Reuben Cohen – mastering
- Michael Graves – additional restoration
- Bryan George – licensing
- Greg Allen – art direction, design
- Robert Toren – photography
- Eileen Lucero – editorial
