= Michael Quercio =

American musician (born 1963)

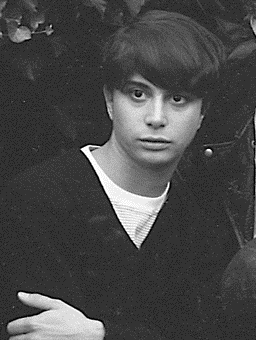
- Michael Quercio in 1989

Background information
- Born: March 13, 1963 (age 63)
- Origin: California, US
- Genres: Paisley Underground
- Occupation: Musician
- Instruments: Vocals; bass guitar
- Years active: 1981–present
- Member of: The Three O'Clock

Michael Quercio (born March 13, 1963) is an American musician. He is the founder, bassist and lead singer of the Three O'Clock, and coined the term Paisley Underground as the name of a musical subgenre.

== Paisley Underground ==
Quercio is best known as the founding member, lead vocalist, and principal songwriter of the Three O'Clock, among the most successful artists of the neo-psychedelic movement of 1980s rock music that became known as the Paisley Underground. Quercio coined the name Paisley Underground for his musical subgenre in late 1982, during an interview with the LA Weekly alternative newspaper. As the event was later reported:

Quercio was close friends with Lina Sedillo who was the bass player with local punk band Peer Group, who had played on the same bill as the Salvation Army on occasion. One evening Sedillo taped Peer Group rehearsing and one of the numbers contained an improvised spoken middle section. Sedillo was wearing a red paisley dress she had bought from a thrift store and his eyes fell on the bass player and out came the line "Words from the paisley underground." Sedillo noticed the phrase while playing the tape back the next day and immediately phoned up Quercio and repeated it to him. They ran a casual 60s music listening group together and thought it a cool name for them to use. When Quercio a few weeks later spontaneously dropped the phrase into an interview when asked to describe the Bangles, Rain Parade and the Three O'Clock sharing the same bill, the interviewer highlighted it in the article as a handy label for this group of bands. And so Quercio had unwittingly came up with the name of this new movement, the Paisley Underground.

The phrase later came to be "hated by the bands it described," though Steve Wynn acknowledged that it was both harmless and helpful to have a "banner" over the movement.

== Musical career ==
=== Salvation Army and the Three O'Clock (1981–1988) ===
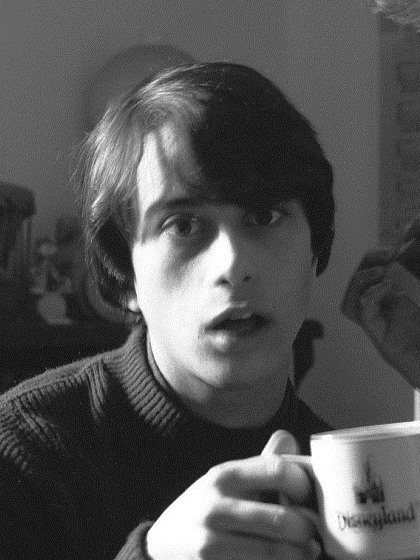
Michael Quercio in 1983

==== The Salvation Army (1981–82) ====
The Three O'Clock originally formed under the name the Salvation Army in 1981. The original lineup, which included Quercio on lead vocals and bass, released a single ("Mind Gardens" b/w "Happen Happened") on the Minutemen's New Alliance label in November, 1981. At this juncture, Quercio (then billed as "Ricky Start") was the band's sole songwriter. Quercio's first significant band, the Salvation Army, played mildly psychedelic pop-influenced tunes with a decidedly punk-like energy, bridging the punk scene of the 1980s and the melodic 1960s revivalist sounds.

By the end of the year, Quercio reverted to his real name, and a new lineup of the Salvation Army signed with LA independent label Frontier Records and released a self-titled debut LP in May 1982. By the summer of 1982, legal problems with the actual Salvation Army forced the band to change their name. Frontier would later reissue the Salvation Army's debut LP, renaming the album Befour Three O'Clock.

==== The Three O'Clock on Frontier (1982/83) ====
The band's new name, the Three O'Clock, came from the time of day they rehearsed. Still signed to Frontier, the band issued the Baroque Hoedown EP, their debut release as the Three O'Clock, in late 1982. The EP was followed by a full-length LP in 1983 entitled Sixteen Tambourines. Both Frontier releases were produced by Earle Mankey. The Three O'Clock had developed into a power-pop ensemble with 1960s garage band influences. Quercio and Louis Gutierrez co-wrote almost all the band's material. They received airplay in Southern California, notably on influential LA station KROQ-FM, and the song "Jet Fighter" from Sixteen Tambourines became a national college radio hit.

==== Rainy Day (1984) ====
Rainy Day was an all-star Paisley Underground band, with a floating membership that included members of Dream Syndicate, the Three O'Clock, Rain Parade and the Bangles. Rainy Day recorded and released their only album in 1984, which consisted of covers of songs by Bob Dylan, the Beach Boys, Buffalo Springfield, Big Star, the Velvet Underground, the Who and Jimi Hendrix. Quercio sang lead on a few tracks, and played on a few others.

==== The Three O'Clock on I.R.S. (1985/86) ====
The Three O'Clock signed to I.R.S. Records for their next album, 1985's Arrive Without Travelling. Producer Mike Hedges recorded the album in Germany. The band had a minor hit with "Her Head's Revolving", whose video received regular airplay on MTV. "Half the Way There" was also released as a 12-inch single.

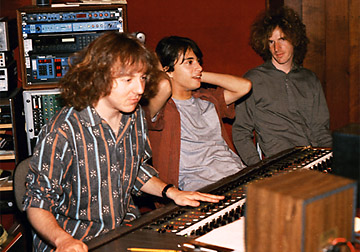
Quercio in 1986, during production of Game Theory's Lolita Nation in San Francisco (L-R: producer Mitch Easter, Quercio, Scott Miller)

The band released the album Ever After, produced by Ian Broudie, in 1986. Quercio once again was the band's chief songwriter, and his single "Suzie's on the Ball Now" gained minor airplay on stations like KROQ-FM in Los Angeles.

==== The Three O'Clock on Paisley Park (1988) ====
In 1988, a new line-up of the Three O'Clock, featuring Jason Falkner on guitar, entered the studio to record the Ian Ritchie-produced Vermillion, on Warner Bros. Records by way of Prince's Paisley Park Records imprint. "Prince was aware of us from Arrive Without Travelling and the 'Her Head's Revolving' video," according to drummer Danny Benair. "The Bangles told us he was a fan, and when we were off IRS, he sent a label person to see us live." Prince himself contributed a song, "Neon Telephone", to Vermillion under the pseudonym Joey Coco. The album was a critical and commercial failure, and did not dent the charts. It was the last Three O'Clock album, and the group disbanded shortly after its release.

=== Tater Totz (1988–89) ===
Tater Totz was a side project cover band launched by members of Redd Kross along with Pat Fear of White Flag and Michael Quercio, billed as "Ricky Start". In 1988 the group released Alien Sleestaks from Brazil, which included songs originally by Queen and Yoko Ono, and featured a cover of the Beatles' "I've Just Seen a Face" with lead vocals by guest Danny Bonaduce. The second Tater Totz album, Sgt. Shonen's Exploding Plastic Eastman Band Request Mono! Stereo, was released in 1989, and included Cherie Currie of the Runaways, and Pat Smear.

=== Game Theory (1989–1990) ===
In the mid-1980s, Quercio had also gained some production experience, working with Game Theory as producer of their 1984 Distortion EP. He later appeared as a guest musician on their albums Real Nighttime (1985) and Lolita Nation (1987).

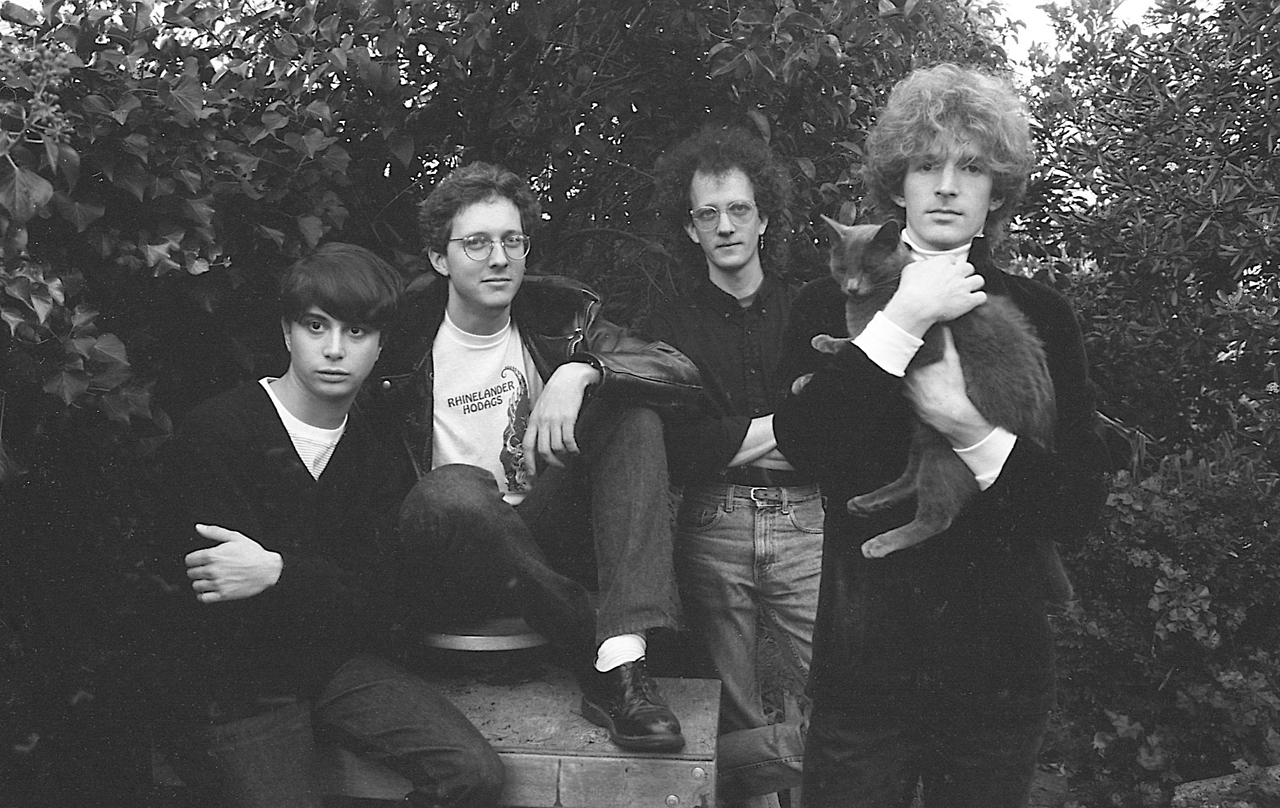
Quercio in Game Theory's final touring line-up, 1989, in Albany, California. L-R: Quercio, J. Becker, Ray, Miller.

In 1989, Scott Miller brought Quercio into a new lineup of his band Game Theory as a full member. This incarnation of Game Theory, which toured in 1989 and 1990, consisted of Quercio (bass, drums, backing vocals), Miller (lead vocal, guitars), Jozef Becker (drums, bass), and the group's former drummer Gil Ray on guitar and keyboards.

In late 1989, the line-up of Miller, Quercio, Ray, and Jozef Becker recorded a demo in San Francisco, co-produced by Miller and Dan Vallor, with four songs that included "Inverness" and "Idiot Son" (both later to be performed by the Loud Family) and, with Quercio taking on lead vocals, "My Free Ride". The London-based tabloid Bucketfull of Brains wrote, "One listen to this latest demo... and you can't help but wonder if pop music can get any better than this."

In a 1990 interview promoting the release of the compilation album Tinker to Evers to Chance, Miller laughed that Game Theory stood at "a rocky pitfall-ridden crossroad," and Quercio noted, "When a major label hears someone like Scott or me sing, they say, 'That doesn't really sound like anybody,' and don't know what market to plug it into.... Sometimes originality is your worst enemy." Game Theory disbanded before releasing a new studio album with Quercio in the lineup. The group remained inactive until the 2017 release of Supercalifragile, an album on which Quercio was initially expected to appear, but ultimately did not.

=== Projects in the 1990s ===
By 1991, Quercio had left Game Theory, opting to return to Los Angeles to form the band Permanent Green Light. He later went on to be a member of Jupiter Affect.

=== Revival of the Three O'Clock (2013–) ===
After 25 years of turning down reunion offers, the Three O'Clock reformed after being presented with a chance to play at the 2013 Coachella Festival. Quercio and two others from the band's "classic" line-up – guitarist Louis Gutierrez and drummer Danny Benair – were joined by new recruit Adam Merrin on keyboards. The group played both weekends of the Coachella festival, and also played on Conan on April 10, 2013. They later embarked on a mini-tour, and released several archival recordings that same year.

In December 2013, the Three O'Clock played two nights with three other reunited Paisley Underground bands – the Bangles, Dream Syndicate, and Rain Parade – at The Fillmore in San Francisco (December 5) and The Fonda Theatre in Los Angeles (December 6 benefit concert). As of 2014, the reunited band remained active and continued to tour.

== Personal life ==
Quercio is openly gay and currently lives in San Pedro, Los Angeles.
