= Merrin =

Merrin may refer to:

- Merrin Dungey, American film and television actress
- Adam Merrin, American musician
- Trent Merrin, Australian professional rugby league footballer
- The Bridled nail-tail wallaby

== Fictional characters ==
- Lankester Merrin, a character in the novel The Exorcist
- Nightsister Merrin, a character in the video game Star Wars Jedi: Fallen Order

== See also ==
- St Merryn, a village in Cornwall
