= The Salvation Army (album) =

Studio album by the Salvation Army
- Released: May 1982
- Recorded: 18–21 March 1982
- Genre: Neo-psychedelia, Paisley Underground
- Label: Frontier Records
- Producer: H.B. Lovecraft

The Salvation Army chronology
The Salvation Army (1982)	Sixteen Tambourines (1983)

Professional ratings
Review scores
Source	Rating
AllMusic	4.5/5 stars

The Salvation Army is the debut album by the Salvation Army, released in 1982. In the summer of 1982, legal problems with the actual Salvation Army forced the band to change their name. The chosen name, "The Three O'Clock," came from the time of day the band rehearsed.

== Track listing ==
Side A

1. "She Turns To Flowers" – 2:34
2. "Upside Down" – 2:11
3. "The Seventeen Forever" – 1:53
4. "Mind Gardens" – 2:46
5. "Grimly Forming" – 3:27

Side B

1. "While We Were In Your Room Talking To Your Wall" – 3:24
2. "Minuet" – 1:50
3. "Happen Happened" – 3:05
4. "I Am Your Guru" – 2:51
5. "Going Home" – 1:51

== Personnel ==
- Michael Quercio – lead vocals, bass
- Troy Howell – drums, kalimba
- Louis "Gregg" Gutierrez – guitar, keyboards
- H.B. Lovecraft – producer
