= This Must Be Love (album) =

Studio album by the 88
- Released: 2009
- Recorded: Los Angeles, CA
- Genre: Swing, blues, rock
- Length: 45:41
- Label: 88 Records
- Producer: Adam Merrin, Keith Slettedahl

The 88 chronology
This Must Be Love (2009)	No One Here (2010)

Professional ratings
Review scores
Source	Rating
AllMusic	3/5 stars

This Must be Love is the fourth independently released album from Los Angeles, California pop/rock band the 88. The album spawned one single release, "Love Is the Thing".

== Track listing ==
1. Go to Heaven
2. Heartsick Town
3. Bad Love
4. This Must Be Love
5. After All
6. Love Is the Thing
7. Carnival Music
8. Nigel
9. One of These Days
10. Yours Tonight
11. I'll Follow You
12. Let Me Go
13. Who Is This
