= Over and Over (The 88 album) =

Studio album by The 88
- Released: September 20, 2005
- Recorded: Los Angeles, CA
- Genre: Indie rock, power pop
- Length: 43:52
- Label: EMK, Mootron
- Producer: Ethan Allen

The 88 chronology
Kind of Light (2003)	Over and Over (2005)	Not Only... But Also (2008)

Professional ratings
Review scores
Source	Rating
AllMusic	3.5/5 stars
PopMatters	(8/10)

Over and Over is the second album from American indie rock band The 88, released in 2005. The album includes the song "Hide Another Mistake", which has been featured on The O.C., Kyle XY and How I Met Your Mother, and the song "Not Enough", which has been featured on "Weeds".

== Track listing ==
All music composed by Keith Slettedahl, except where noted.

No.	Title	Writer(s)	Length
1.	"Hide Another Mistake"		2:36
2.	"All 'Cause of You"		3:53
3.	"Nobody Cares"		3:49
4.	"Bowls"		4:47
5.	"Head Cut Off"		2:59
6.	"Battle Scar"	Slettedahl, Brandon Jay, Adam Merrin	3:41
7.	"Coming Home"		3:38
8.	"You Belong to Me"		3:27
9.	"Haunt You"		2:27
10.	"Jesus Is Good"		4:25
11.	"Everybody Loves Me"		4:39
12.	"Not Enough"		4:44
Total length:			44:05
