= Sixteen Tambourines =

Studio album by the Three O'Clock
- Released: October 1983
- Genre: Alternative rock, Paisley Underground
- Label: Frontier
- Producer: Earle Mankey

The Three O'Clock chronology
The Salvation Army (1982)	Sixteen Tambourines (1983)	Arrive Without Travelling (1985)

Sixteen Tambourines is the first album by the Three O'Clock, released in 1983.

== Critical reception ==
Professional ratings
Review scores
Source	Rating
AllMusic	4.5/5 stars
The Village Voice	C+

Critical reaction to Sixteen Tambourines has been polarized, with the album being hailed as "incredible" in some quarters, but dismissed as "precious" or "twee" in others.

Trouser Press described the album as "absolutely charming and remarkably memorable," as well as being "an incredible full-length collection of chiming, memorable power pop tunes played and sung as if each track were likely to get played on every radio station coast-to-coast," singling out producer Earle Mankey's work as "slick and inventive."

In a contemporary review for The Village Voice, Robert Christgau gave Sixteen Tambourines a "C+" and said hearing such "precious falsettos" and "baroquely tuneful" music "might (I said might) have been fun" in the 1960s, "but in 1983 it's likely to make a grown man puke". A blogger for The Guardian later called the album "pretty awful", complaining that the Three O'Clock "always hinted at something incredible, and then ruined it all with an anaemic keyboard line or singer Michael Quericio's weedy vocals. If you were to sum them up in one word, it would be twee."

Reviewing the album's paired release with the 1982 EP Baroque Hoedown, AllMusic critic Sean Westergaard recommended the release as "a good way to check out this important band from the paisley underground".

== Track listing ==
All songs written by Louis Gutierrez and Michael Quercio, except where noted.

Side A

1. "Jet Fighter" – 3:22 (Mariano, Gutierrez and Quercio)
2. "Stupid Einstein" – 2:17
3. "And So We Run" – 2:40
4. "Fall to the Ground" – 2:27
5. "A Day in Erotica" – 4:20

Side B

1. "Tomorrow" – 3:41
2. "In My Own Time" – 2:03 (Barry Gibb, Robin Gibb)
3. "On My Own" – 2:48
4. "When Lightning Starts" – 3:31
5. "Seeing Is Believing" – 4:27

== Personnel ==
- Danny Benair – drums
- Louis Gutierrez – guitar, vocals, percussion
- Mike Mariano – keyboards, vocals, percussion
- Michael Quercio – vocals, bass guitar, percussion
- Earle Mankey – producer
