= Ever After (The Three O'Clock album) =

Studio album by the Three O'Clock
- Released: 1986
- Genre: Alternative rock, Paisley Underground
- Label: I.R.S. Records
- Producer: Ian Broudie

The Three O'Clock chronology
Arrive Without Travelling (1985)	Ever After (1986)	Vermillion (1988)

Ever After is the third album by the Three O'Clock, released in 1986 (see 1986 in music). The album was produced by Lightning Seeds frontman Ian Broudie, former member of the New Wave bands Big in Japan and Care.

== Track listing ==
Side A

1. "Suzie's On The Ball Now" – 3.05
2. "Look Into Our Eyes" – 3.55
3. "When We Can" – 4.05
4. "The Penny Girls" – 3.22
5. "Follow Him Around" – 4.40

Side B

1. "Warm Aspirations" – 3.22
2. "Step Out Of Line" – 3.06
3. "We Are One" – 3.15
4. "If You Could See My Way" – 3.24
5. "Songs And Gentle Words" – 5.08
