= Todd O'Keefe =

American singer-songwriter, guitarist (b. 1972)

- Born: November 10, 1972 (age 53); Greenwich, Connecticut, U.S.
- Genres: pop, folk, rock, indie rock
- Occupation: Musician
- Instruments: Vocals, Bass, Guitar
- Years active: 1999–present
- Website: www.toddokeefe.com

Todd O'Keefe (born November 10, 1972) is an American singer-songwriter, guitarist and bass player. Artists O'Keefe has worked with include The 88, Ray Davies, Black Francis, Jeff Beck, Elvis Costello and Rusty Anderson. O'Keefe contributed background vocals to Social Distortion's 2010 release Hard Times and Nursery Rhymes as well as their 2026 album Born To Kill. He sang on The Posies 2016 album Solid States. He was the singer and guitarist for Los Angeles pop rock band The Green and Yellow TV.
