= The 88 =

American pop rock band (2002–2016)

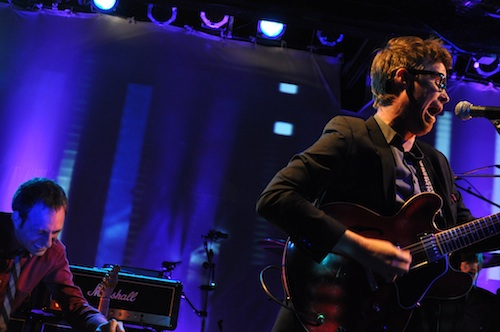
- The 88 live in concert, 2009

Background information
- Origin: Los Angeles, California, United States
- Genres: Power pop
- Years active: 2002–2016
- Labels: Island Records, 88 Records
- Members: Adam Merrin; Todd O'Keefe; Keith Slettedahl; Anthony Zimmitti
- Past members: Carlos Torres; Mark Vasapolli; Brandon Jay
- Website: The88.net

The 88 was an American pop rock band from Los Angeles, California. The group consisted of Keith Slettedahl (vocals and guitar), Adam Merrin (keyboards and vocals), Anthony Zimmitti (drums and percussion), and Todd O'Keefe (bass and vocals). Meeting in high school in Calabasas, California, Adam Merrin and Keith Slettedahl formed the band in 2002. The band's popularity grew from high-profile song placements in video games, films, commercials, and popular TV shows.

From 2010 to 2012, the band toured and recorded with the Kinks leader Ray Davies, serving as his opening act and backing Davies for his set. The band performed with Davies at the Royal Albert Hall in London in 2011.

They have also performed with Elliott Smith, The Smashing Pumpkins, The B-52's, Elvis Costello, Black Francis, The Zombies, and The Flaming Lips.

Their track "At Least It Was Here" is the opening theme song to the television series Community. In 2012, the band co-scored the film Friends with Kids.

== Work with Ray Davies ==
In 2010, the band acted as the support act and back up band for Ray Davies on his American tour. For the next two years, the band performed with Davies, including performances at London's Royal Albert Hall and Japan's Fuji Rock Festival. The 88 performed with Davies and Elvis Costello at Clive Davis's pre-Grammy party in 2012. The band recorded with Davies at Konk Studios in London on Davies' duets album See My Friends. The 88 played on "Long Way From Home" with Lucinda Williams and "Till the End of the Day" with Alex Chilton (Chilton's final recorded performance), as well as recording a version of "David Watts" with Davies. The band did a promotional tour for See My Friends with Davies including performances on Late Night with Jimmy Fallon, and The Regis and Kelly show.

== Television, film and video games ==
The 88 wrote and performed "At Least It Was Here", the opening theme song for the television series Community.

Their song "You Belong to Me" is on the soundtrack of How I Met Your Mother's episode "Belly Full of Turkey". The band was also featured on the episode "Best Prom Ever" of that same series. Their song "No One Here" was used during the Season 2 finale "Something Blue".

Their song "How Good it Can Be" is on the soundtrack of The O.C.. "All 'Cause of You" is on the soundtrack for You, Me and Dupree.

"No One Here" and also "All 'Cause of You" were used in Blue Lagoon: The Awakening, the 2012 remake of The Blue Lagoon.

In film, the band co-scored the 2012 movie Friends with Kids. That same year, The 88 performed on the soundtrack to the film The Lorax.

The song "Sons and Daughters" appeared as downloadable content for the video game Rock Band.

The band appeared in one issue of the comic series Manhunter.

== Members ==
- Keith Slettedahl – vocals/guitar
- Adam Merrin – piano/keyboards
- Todd O'Keefe – bass guitar
- Anthony Zimmitti – drums

== Discography ==
Albums

- Kind of Light (June 2003) EMK/Mootron Records
- Over and Over (September 2005) EMK/Mootron Records
- Not Only... But Also (October 2008) Island Records
- This Must Be Love (November 2009) 88 Records
- The 88 (September 2010) 88 Records
- Fortune Teller (June 2013) 88 Records
- Close to You (December 2016) 88 Records

EPs

- No One Here (February 2010) 88 Records
- Actors (March 2012) 88 Records

Singles

- "All I Want For Christmas Is You" (November 2009) 88 Records
- "Love Is The Thing" (June 2009) 88 Records

Appearances

- Various Artists - Community (Music from the Original Television Series) (September 2010) Madison Gate Records
- Ray Davies - See My Friends (November 2010) Universal
- John Powell and Cinco Paul - Dr. Seuss' The Lorax: Original Songs from the Motion Picture (February 2012) Interscope Records, Back Lot Music
