= Distortion (Game Theory EP) =

EP by Game Theory
- Released: 1984
- Recorded: 1983
- Genre: Power pop, jangle pop
- Length: 17:01
- Label: Rational
- Producer: Michael Quercio

Game Theory chronology
Pointed Accounts of People You Know (1983)	Distortion (1984)	Dead Center (1984)

Distortion is a 1984 five-song EP by Game Theory, a California power pop band fronted by guitarist and singer-songwriter Scott Miller. A remastered reissue of Distortion was released by Omnivore Recordings in November 2014 as a 10-inch EP on green vinyl, with four of the songs released on CD as part of Omnivore's reissued Dead Center compilation.

== Production notes ==
Distortion was recorded in December 1983 at Samurai Sound Lab in Davis, California, a studio co-owned by the band's drummer, Dave Gill. In addition to Gill, the band included Scott Miller on guitar and lead vocals, Nancy Becker on keyboards and Fred Juhos on bass.

The EP was produced by Michael Quercio of The Three O'Clock, who also contributed guest backing vocals. Quercio continued to contribute as a guest musician on several Game Theory albums, and became a full member of Game Theory in 1989 and 1990.

Prior to the selection of Quercio to produce Distortion, Mitch Easter had been contacted, but was unavailable. Easter would go on to produce Real Nighttime (recorded 1984) and all of Game Theory's later albums.

On two tracks, guitar solos were provided by Earl Slick (credited as Ernie Smith), who was then a sideman for David Bowie. Slick had been introduced to the band through his family connection with engineer Dave Scott Millington.

All five songs on Distortion were reissued on CD in 1993 by Alias Records as part of the compilation album Distortion of Glory.

=== 2014 reissue ===
In July 2014, Omnivore Recordings announced its commitment to reissue Game Theory's recordings, remastered from the original tapes by co-producer Dan Vallor, who was Game Theory's tour manager and sound engineer during the 1980s. Distortion was released on 10-inch green vinyl on November 28, 2014, in a limited pressing of 1,500 copies, available only in record stores, as part of Black Friday Record Store Day. On that same date, Omnivore released the Pointed Accounts of People You Know EP on 10-inch clear vinyl. The Pointed Accounts and Distortion EP releases included download cards.

Earlier that week, on November 24, Omnivore reissued the French compilation Dead Center as an omnibus release on CD, encompassing material from both EPs and additional tracks. At the request of Fred Juhos, the reissue of Dead Center omitted all songs written by Juhos, which became available exclusively on the EP releases and their associated digital downloads.

== Thematic notes ==
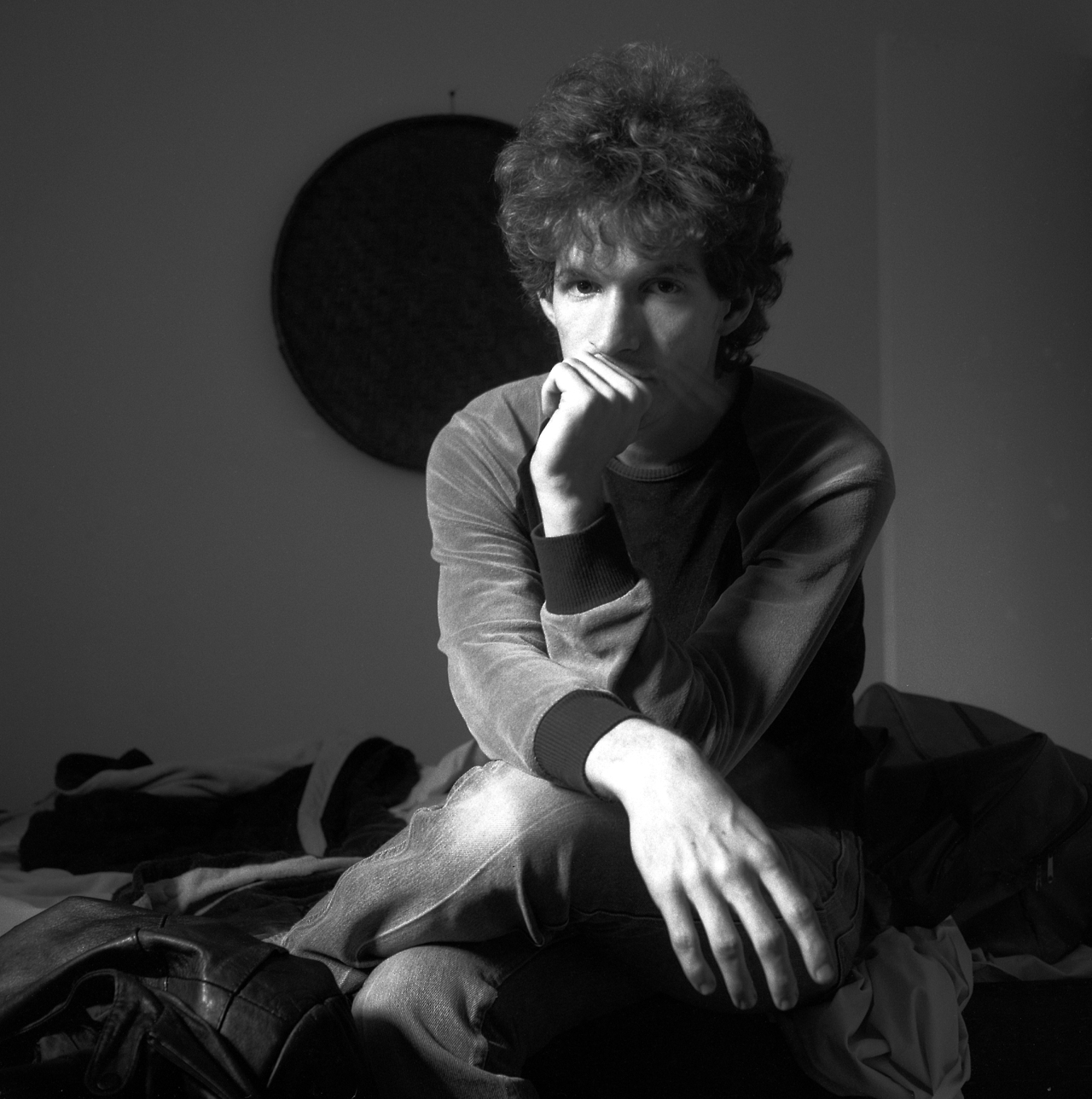
Scott Miller during recording of Distortion in 1983

In 1990, Scott Miller pointed to "The Red Baron" as the song that "crystallized the style of a class of my songs I’ve called young-adult-hurt-feeling-athons."

Analyzing the themes of Game Theory's early work, Harvard professor Stephen Burt wrote:

A teen's sense of social exclusion runs through many of Miller's early songs, but so does his enthusiasm when (to his surprise) he fits in ... These well-educated kids know better than to cast themselves as complete outcasts. Self-knowledge defeats their self-pity, but that defeat does not lead to other victories. It might not even help them get a date, despite desperate measures: "Let’s get out the Twister game and get down on all fours," suggested "Nine Lives to Rigel Five," from Distortion (1983), though its arrangements are hardly four-on-the-floor.

"Nine Lives to Rigel Five," according to AllMusic's Stewart Mason, "obliquely concerns one of Scott Miller's favorite topics, the disconnect between childhood wonder and adult reality." In the original Star Trek episodes of the 1960s, the star Rigel and its numbered planets had been mentioned numerous times. Mason wrote, "Anyone who was a kid during the '50s and '60s space race had been told by no less an authority than Scientific American that by 1984, we'd all be living on the moon and driving personal spaceships, and the fact that we're not is, on some level, still something of a disappointment."

== Critical response and legacy ==
Professional ratings
Review scores
Source	Rating
AllMusic	3/5 stars

The Michigan Daily, in a 1984 review, called Distortion "near-perfect vaguely retrograde pop, with consummately whiny adolescent vocals by Scott Miller and gorgeous tunes by the same." Pointing to producer Michael Quercio as a "neo-psychedelic whimsy-pop superstar," the review also cited the "addictive melody" and "lyrics of the century" in "Nine Lives to Rigel Five," and called "Shark Pretty" a "thumping must at any party."

In the early 1990s, comparing Distortion to the earlier Blaze of Glory LP, Trouser Press found Distortion to be "fuller, but not as fresh sounding", stating that "Miller's fey falsetto and fragile melodies" were rendered "too precious" by a "more baroque presentation."

Conversely, AllMusic critic Ned Raggett wrote that on Distortion, Scott Miller "practically defines winsome vocal sweetness spiked with bite," calling the EP "some beautiful art pop," and "one set of treats after another." Raggett added that "the band collectively put in great performances," crediting Dave Gill's "rumbling drum punch" and Nancy Becker's keyboard lead on "Nine Lives to Rigel Five," which another reviewer called "gloriously cheesy synth-pop riffs."

Assessing Gill's percussion on "Nine Lives to Rigel Five," Stephen Burt wrote, "It sounds old-school science-fictional, early-digital, like late Devo, or late Yes. The chorus imagines exile via starship, propelled by what sounds like, not a drum machine, but electronic drums, the kind with hexagonal heads."

In the 2002 book All Music Guide to Rock: The Definitive Guide to Rock, Pop, and Soul, reviewer Stewart Mason cited "Shark Pretty" for its "exultant charge" and "some of the band's strongest-sounding guitar yet," provided by guest soloist Earl Slick.

Mason also pointed to "The Red Baron" as an example of the EP's "stellar material," calling it an "anguished acoustic lost-love song" with its heartbreak lightened by "keyboardist Nancy Becker's mocking 'Fifty or more' backing vocal," which tied the song's title to the Royal Guardsmen's 1966 novelty song "Snoopy vs. the Red Baron." Miller and Becker's "dreamy acoustic strum and synth" in "The Red Baron" were also cited by Raggett as contributing to the "breezy sweetness of the band."

=== Later performances ===
In 1999, "Nine Lives to Rigel Five" was covered by the band Gaze on their album Shake the Pounce.

Game Theory's 2013 reunion performance, a memorial tribute to Scott Miller, included "The Red Baron," and the set closed with the upbeat "Too Late for Tears" and "Shark Pretty."

In 2014, Donnette Thayer recorded a cover of "The Red Baron" for a Scott Miller memorial tribute album that remains unreleased. Thayer, who had been a member of Game Theory from 1986 to 1988, released a music video of her version.

== Track listing ==
All tracks are written by Scott Miller, except as noted.

Side One
No.	Title	Length
1.	"Shark Pretty"	3:59
2.	"Nine Lives to Rigel Five"	2:44
3.	"The Red Baron"	3:41

Side Two
No.	Title	Writer(s)	Length
4.	"Kid Convenience"	Fred Juhos	3:09
5.	"Too Late For Tears"		3:44

== Personnel ==
=== Musical credits ===
Members:

- Scott Miller – guitar, lead and backing vocals
- Dave Gill – drums
- Fred Juhos – bass, lead vocal on "Kid Convenience"
- Nancy Becker – keyboards, backing vocals

Guest musicians:

- Michael Quercio – additional backing vocals
- Earl Slick – guitar solos on "Shark Pretty" and "Kid Convenience" (credited as Ernie Smith)
- Gordon Beadle – tenor saxophone on "Kid Convenience"
- Michael Stoaks – trumpet on "Kid Convenience"

=== Production credits ===
- Michael Quercio – producer
- Dave Scott Millington – engineer
- Dave Gill – co-engineer
- Jeff Sanders – mastering
