= Paisley Underground =

Music genre

- Stylistic origins: Post-punk; alternative rock; punk rock; folk rock; garage rock; psychedelic rock; jangle pop; neo-psychedelia
- Cultural origins: Early to mid-1980s, Los Angeles, Sacramento and Davis in California

Local scenes
- Los Angeles; Sacramento; Davis

Other topics
- Dunedin sound

Paisley Underground was a musical scene that originated in California. It was particularly popular in Los Angeles, reaching a peak in the mid-1980s. Paisley Underground bands often incorporated psychedelia, rich vocal harmonies and guitar interplay, owing a particular debt to 1960s groups such as Love and the Byrds, but more generally referencing a wide range of pop and garage rock revival.

== Etymology ==
The term "Paisley Underground" originated in late 1982, and took root with a comment made by Michael Quercio of the band the Three O'Clock, during an interview with the LA Weekly alternative newspaper. As the event was later reported:

Quercio was close friends with Lina Sedillo who was the bass player with local punk band Peer Group, who had played on the same bill as The Salvation Army on occasion. One evening Sedillo taped Peer Group rehearsing and one of the numbers contained an improvised spoken middle section. Sedillo was wearing a red paisley dress she had bought from a thrift store and his eyes fell on the bass player and out came the line "Words from the paisley underground." Sedillo noticed the phrase while playing the tape back the next day and immediately phoned up Quercio and repeated it to him. They ran a casual 60s music listening group together and thought it a cool name for them to use. When Quercio a few weeks later spontaneously dropped the phrase into an interview when asked to describe the Bangles, Rain Parade and the Three O'Clock sharing the same bill, the interviewer highlighted it in the article as a handy label for this group of bands. And so Quercio had unwittingly came up with the name of this new movement, the Paisley Underground.

The phrase later came to be "hated by the bands it described", though Steve Wynn acknowledged that it was both harmless and helpful to have a "banner" over the movement.

== California scenes ==
=== Southern California ===
Pat Thomas has described the Paisley Underground sound as a "marriage of classic rock and punk". Although there were accomplished musicians among the groups, the scene was also rooted—as was the punk rock that preceded it—in an inspired amateurism described as "a punk D.I.Y. ethic".

The Dream Syndicate, for example, combined influences from the Velvet Underground, Quicksilver Messenger Service, Crazy Horse, and Creedence Clearwater Revival with the energy of punk, influencing other musicians who "wanted to move on from pro forma p‑rock but keep the intensity".

Green on Red came on as a cousin to the Doors; Rain Parade a melodic melding of Love, the Beatles, Big Star, and the Velvet Underground; the Long Ryders honored Gram Parsons and Buffalo Springfield; the Three O'Clock owed debt to the Bee Gees and the Monkees; the Bangles recalled the Mamas & the Papas, and so on. The 1970s Memphis-based cult band Big Star, whose "September Gurls" was covered by the Bangles, was also influential, as were Britain's Soft Boys. John Hoffs, best friend of David Roback and brother of Susanna Hoffs was an idea contributor to starting a unique new sound, a Paisley Underground all girl band.

Paisley Underground bands frequently shared bills, socialized, and collaborated on side projects. For example:

- Rainy Day was formed by members of Rain Parade, the Bangles, the Dream Syndicate and the Three O'Clock, who joined to release an eponymous album of cover versions of songs by the Velvet Underground, Buffalo Springfield, Bob Dylan, the Beach Boys, Big Star, Jimi Hendrix, and the Who.
- Danny & Dusty, a duo formed by Steve Wynn of the Dream Syndicate and Dan Stuart of Green on Red, made the album The Lost Weekend in 1985, backed by members of both bands along with most of the Long Ryders.
- Clay Allison was an offshoot band composed of David Roback and Will Glenn of Rain Parade, Kendra Smith of Dream Syndicate, Sylvia Juncosa of the Leaving Trains, and Keith Mitchell of Monitor.
- Opal was adopted as a new name for Clay Allison in 1984, prior to the release of their Fell from the Sun EP.

In 1986, the Rain Parade were the first of the Paisley Underground bands to break up, followed by the Long Ryders in 1987, the Three O'Clock in 1988, the Dream Syndicate and the Bangles in 1989, and Green on Red in 1992.

=== Sacramento and Davis ===
Even before the Los Angeles-based Paisley Underground took shape, the Sacramento/Davis area of Northern California was an early focus of Paisley Underground bands and musicians, some of whom later moved to Los Angeles.

The Suspects were a Davis-based predecessor to Dream Syndicate, formed in 1979 by guitarist Steve Wynn and bassist Kendra Smith (who were both disc jockeys at college radio station KDVS at the time), with Russ Tolman on lead guitar and Gavin Blair on drums. They released one single in 1979, and performed in the Davis area through 1981. When Wynn and Smith left for Los Angeles in 1981 and formed Dream Syndicate, Tolman and Blair remained in Davis and started up True West.

During a brief period in 1981 between leaving the Suspects and forming Dream Syndicate, Wynn also formed the short-lived band 15 Minutes in Davis, with members of Alternate Learning. Their only single, "That's What You Always Say", was later re-recorded by Dream Syndicate for their 1982 album The Days of Wine and Roses.

Game Theory and Thin White Rope, which were both formed in Davis in 1981–82, also "fit in well with the other Paisley Underground bands that started up around the same time". For example, the Three O'Clock's Michael Quercio produced Game Theory's 1984 Distortion EP, also contributing backup vocals. Quercio appeared as a guest on several more Game Theory albums, ultimately joining as a member in 1989, after the breakup of the Three O'Clock.

Quercio and Game Theory frontman Scott Miller co-wrote "The Girl with the Guitar (Says Oh Yeah)", a Paisley song described as timeless and poignant, which first appeared on the Three O'Clock's Arrive Without Travelling. Live and studio performances of the Game Theory version, titled "Girl w/ a Guitar", appeared as CD bonus tracks on the 1993 reissue of Game Theory's The Big Shot Chronicles and the 2014 reissue of Real Nighttime.

The band 28th Day, formed in 1982 in Chico, California (a small college town about 83 miles north of Davis), was also part of the Paisley Underground. 28th Day consisted of Barbara Manning (bass, vocals), Cole Marquis (guitar, vocals), and Mike Cloward (drums). Their first EP was produced by True West's Russ Tolman and released on his Bring Out Your Dead label.

== Related scenes ==
The Paisley Underground movement was paralleled in other parts of the world by genres such as New Zealand's Dunedin sound, whose chief exponents (such as the Chills and Sneaky Feelings) were often cited as directly comparable to Paisley Underground bands. A related genre of 1980s guitar rock is named jangle pop after the ringing, light guitar sounds, such as those of R.E.M., that also often featured in Paisley Underground music.

== Legacy and influence ==
Although many of the Paisley Underground groups released at least one album on a major label, by far the most commercially successful band to emerge from the movement was the Bangles, who had several mainstream hits in the 1980s, reaching number 1 in the United States with the single "Walk Like an Egyptian" in 1986.

The movement's influence on 1980s contemporaries, such as English bands The Teardrop Explodes and Echo & the Bunnymen, and Seattle's The Green Pajamas, has been noted. In the mid-1980s, Prince was notably influenced by the Paisley Underground sound: not only did his 1985 album Around the World in a Day have a more psychedelic sound than any of his previous or future work, but he also named his record label (Paisley Park Records) after the movement, wrote "Manic Monday" for the Bangles, and signed the Three O'Clock to his label.

As the Paisley Underground bands of the 1980s broke up, some of their members came together in new combinations which continued to record through the 1990s and later:

- Viva Saturn was formed in 1989 by Steven Roback, with fellow Rain Parade alumni John Thoman and Will Glenn. Glenn later joined Mazzy Star, and was replaced by another former Rain Parade member, Matt Piucci.
- Continental Drifters, formed in 1991, included Mark Walton of the Dream Syndicate and Vicki Peterson of the Bangles. The band was originally active through 2001, and has reunited in 2009 and 2015.
- Mazzy Star evolved from Opal in 1989 when Kendra Smith was replaced by Hope Sandoval. Their fourth studio album, Seasons of Your Day, was released in 2013.

Other currently active recording artists who are cited as influenced by the Paisley Underground include the Allah-Las, Exploding Flowers, Mercury Rev, The Gentle Cycle (led by latter Rain Parade member Derek See), and Grandaddy.

In 2005, Rhino released Children of Nuggets: Original Artyfacts from the Second Psychedelic Era, 1976–1995, a four-CD box set which anthologized many Paisley Underground and related bands. The title referred to the original 1972 compilation Nuggets: Original Artyfacts from the First Psychedelic Era, 1965–1968, whose music influenced the bands featured on Children of Nuggets.

== Revival and band reunions ==
True West did a number of reunion shows in the years 2006 through 2009, including a few shows with Violent Femmes, including at The Fillmore in San Francisco. True West also played the Down On The Farm festival in Norway in 2009.

2013 saw a series of reunions among the original Paisley Underground bands. After 25 years of turning down reunion offers, the Three O'Clock reformed after being presented with a chance to play at the 2013 Coachella Festival. Michael Quercio (vocals/bass), Louis Gutierrez (guitars), and Danny Benair (drums) were joined by new recruit Adam Merrin (keyboards). The group played both weekends of Coachella, appeared on the late-night talk show Conan, embarked on a brief concert tour, and released several archival recordings.

In December 2013, four reunited Paisley Underground bands – the Bangles, the Three O'Clock, Dream Syndicate, and Rain Parade – played a concert together at The Fillmore in San Francisco, followed by a benefit concert at The Fonda Theatre the next evening in Los Angeles.

In late 2018 the four bands collaborated on a Yep Roc Records album 3 x 4, where each of the four bands performed one song each that had been originated by each of the three other bands.
