= Pointed Accounts of People You Know =

EP by Game Theory
- Released: 1983; 2014 (reissue)
- Recorded: May 1983
- Genre: Power pop, jangle pop
- Length: 22:52
- Label: Rational, Omnivore
- Producer: Scott Miller

Game Theory chronology
Blaze of Glory (1982)	Pointed Accounts of People You Know (1983)	Distortion (1984)

Pointed Accounts of People You Know is the second release from Game Theory, a California power pop band fronted by guitarist and singer-songwriter Scott Miller. Initially released in 1983 as a six-song EP, a remastered version on 10-inch clear vinyl was reissued in November 2014 by Omnivore Recordings.

== Production notes ==
Pointed Accounts of People You Know was recorded in May 1983 at Samurai Sound Lab in Davis, California, a studio co-owned by Dave Gill, the band's new drummer, who replaced Michael Irwin. The lineup included Scott Miller on guitar and lead vocals, Nancy Becker on keyboards, Gill on drums and Fred Juhos on bass.

Two of the EP's six songs were contributed by Fred Juhos, and one ("Life in July") was co-written by Miller and Nancy Becker. All three appeared on the B-side of the EP. As a result, the A-side label stated "All Songs by Scott Miller," and the B-side label stated "All Songs by Fred Juhos, except as indicated."

Several years later, in the liner notes of the 1990 compilation Tinker to Evers to Chance, Miller wrote, "I'd forgotten what great bass and drum parts Fred Juhos and Dave Gill wrote and played" on "Penny, Things Won't." Miller gave credit to Juhos for the title of the EP, and added, "if they are pointed accounts of someone you know, sue him."

Four of the songs were reissued on CD in 1993 by Alias Records as part of the compilation album Distortion of Glory.

=== 2014 reissue ===
In July 2014, Omnivore Recordings announced its commitment to reissue Game Theory's recordings, remastered from the original tapes by co-producer Dan Vallor, who was Game Theory's tour manager and sound engineer during the 1980s. The remastered version of Pointed Accounts of People You Know on 10-inch clear vinyl was released on November 28, 2014, in a limited pressing of 1,500 copies, available only in record stores, as part of Black Friday Record Store Day. On that same date, Omnivore reissued the Distortion EP on 10-inch green vinyl. The 2014 Pointed Accounts and Distortion EP releases included download cards.

Earlier the same week, on November 24, Omnivore reissued the French compilation Dead Center as an omnibus release on CD, encompassing material from both EPs and additional tracks. At the request of Fred Juhos, the reissue of Dead Center omitted all songs written by Juhos, making them available exclusively on the EP releases and their associated digital downloads.

== Critical response ==
Professional ratings
Review scores
Source	Rating
AllMusic	2.5/5 stars

=== A-side ===
Trouser Press described the first side of Pointed Accounts as "light" and Miller's songs as "slightly off-kilter." Lyrics such as "she likes metal and glass exact" were labeled "cryptic... but the hooks make them go down smoothly."

In a 1994 interview, Scott Miller similarly described the early Game Theory EPs as "spotty in quality," and identified "Metal and Glass Exact" as one of the few songs he considered good, "sort of mid-tempo Elvis Costello."

AllMusic's Ned Raggett pointed to a contrast "between winning melody and slightly fragile edge" in "Penny, Things Won't" as exemplifying a "slightly moodier shade" than Davis-based contemporaries like Dream Syndicate and Thin White Rope. Raggett wrote:

Generally, the six songs on Pointed Accounts find Game Theory still in general thrall to its '60s-inspired, '80s-recorded indie pop vision -- not quite revivalist but avoiding mainstream temptations. "Selfish Again" makes for a catchy little rocker, slowly growing in steady intensity and adding a little bit of glazed VU/psych drone in the background...

In the 2002 book All Music Guide to Rock: The Definitive Guide to Rock, Pop, and Soul, reviewer Stewart Mason cited the "winsome" song "Penny, Things Won't," and the "sneering rocker" "Metal and Glass Exact," naming them as examples of "stellar material" that appeared on the Pointed Accounts EP.

=== B-side ===
According to Trouser Press, differences between the two sides of Pointed Accounts caused the EP to be "schizy".

The song "Life in July," co-written by Scott Miller and Nancy Becker, was "amiably quirky" according to AllMusic's Ned Raggett, with "pure herky-jerky new wave synth fun, a bubbling rush of fun that lives up to the title." Becker's synth and vocals were also noted on the music blog Vinyl Exam, where a reviewer found the song (despite some "New Wave cliches") to be "catchy", citing its "cheesy 80s synthesizer sound, big drums, a bouncy beat" and Becker's vocals.

The two songs contributed by Fred Juhos were omitted from the 1993 compilation album Distortion of Glory, to the regret of AllMusic's Stewart Mason:

The sarcastic fake-rap of "Kid Convenience" [from the Distortion EP] made the cut, but neither of Juhos' other, much better, Game Theory offerings did. Either the haunting "37th Day" or the bitter "I Wanna Get Hit by A Car" (which was actually one of Game Theory's most popular early songs on college radio) would have better commemorated Juhos' tenure in the band.

In 1991, Trouser Press found Juhos' vision to be "further out" than Miller's, "darker and somewhat more intriguing, but he isn't Miller's equal as a tunesmith." Twenty years later, Vinyl Exam wrote that the Juhos contribution "I Wanna Get Hit By a Car" was a "New Wave novelty song" that grew on the reviewer, blending The B-52's and Oingo Boingo influences. Juhos' "37th Day" was cited as "another departure ... a jangle pop ballad that evokes early Jefferson Airplane or Love without being explicitly retro."

Mike Appelstein, in the 2005 book Lost in the Grooves, summed up his view of Game Theory's first three releases with a comparison drawn from the two sides of Pointed Accounts: "Scott Miller had already proven himself capable of brilliant tunesmithing on the level of "Metal and Glass Exact" ... But this was the group responsible for "I Wanna Get Hit by a Car," which was as pretentious as its title. On one album and two EPs, Game Theory soared toward the power pop heights, but sometimes settled for a thin, cheesy Casio rhythm. Through it all, they displayed a sense of ambition and high concept they weren't yet capable of reaching.

== Later performances ==
Game Theory's 2013 reunion performance, a memorial tribute to Scott Miller, included an acoustic performance of "Penny, Things Won't," with vocalist Alison Faith Levy accompanied by Fred Juhos on piano.

"Selfish Again" was covered by Eric Matthews, known for bringing classical orchestral influences to indie pop music, and first released as a music video in January 2014. According to the release notes, the recording was "to be featured on an upcoming tribute to the songs of Scott Miller." In an interview, Miller had named Matthews on a short list of artists he would have wanted to cover his songs.

== Track listing ==
All tracks are written by Scott Miller, except as noted.

Side One
No.	Title	Length
1.	"Penny, Things Won't"	5:16
2.	"Metal and Glass Exact"	3:33
3.	"Selfish Again"	4:08

Side Two
No.	Title	Writer(s)	Length
4.	"I Wanna Get Hit by a Car"	Fred Juhos	3:28
5.	"Life in July"	Scott Miller, Nancy Becker	2:38
6.	"37th Day"	Fred Juhos	3:49

== Personnel ==
=== Musical credits ===
Members:

- Scott Miller – lead guitar, vocals
- Fred Juhos – bass, keyboard, vocals
- Nancy Becker – keyboards, vocals
- Dave Gill – drums

Guest musicians:

- Dave Scott Millington – keyboards on "37th Day"

=== Production credits ===
- Scott Miller – producer
- Dave Scott Millington – engineer
- Jeff Sanders – mastering
