= Green and Yellow TV =

American pop rock band

The Green and Yellow TV
- Origin: Los Angeles, California
- Genres: Indie rock, power pop, neo-psychedelia
- Years active: 1997–2006
- Past members: Justin Rocherolle; Michael Regilio; Io Perry; Todd O'Keefe; Steven Shane McDonald

Green and Yellow TV was an American rock band from Silver Lake, Los Angeles.

Their music was described by critics as having been influenced by 1960s psychedelia.

== Discography ==
- Scarecrow Museum EP (1999)
- As Performed By (2000)
- Record X (2001)
- "That Says It All" (single) (2003)
- Sinister Barrier (2006)
