= Kind of Light =

Studio album by The 88
- Released: June 2003
- Recorded: Los Angeles, CA
- Genre: Rock / Pop
- Length: 43:30
- Label: Mootron Records
- Producer: Adam Merrin

The 88 chronology
Kind of Light (2003)	Over and Over (2005)

Professional ratings
Review scores
Source	Rating
Allmusic	3/5 stars

Kind of Light, released in 2003 is the debut album from Los Angeles, California pop/rock band The 88. The album includes the songs "How Good It Can Be" and "Hard to Be You" which have featured on The O.C.

== Track listing ==
All tracks are written by Keith Slettedahl.

No.	Title	Length
1.	"All the Same"	2:12
2.	"Afterlife"	3:23
3.	"Elbow Blues"	3:42
4.	"How Good It Can Be"	3:53
5.	"Kind of Light"	3:59
6.	"No Use Left for Me"	3:42
7.	"God Is Coming"	3:45
8.	"Hate Me"	5:02
9.	"I'm a Man"	4:01
10.	"Melting in the Sun"	3:48
11.	"Sunday Afternoon"	3:21
12.	"Something Had Me Good"	2:52
13.	"Hard to Be You"	2:30

=== Enhanced version ===
The 88 have released an enhanced version of Kind of Light which features new artwork and 2 bonus music videos.
