= Arrive Without Travelling =

Studio album by the Three O'Clock
- Released: 1985
- Genre: Alternative rock, paisley underground
- Label: I.R.S.
- Producer: Mike Hedges

The Three O'Clock chronology
Sixteen Tambourines (1983)	Arrive Without Travelling (1985)	Ever After (1986)

Arrive Without Travelling, released in 1985, is the second album by the Three O'Clock, and their I.R.S. Records debut. The title was taken from a line from "The Inner Light", a song by George Harrison, which in turn derived the phrase from verse 47 of the Tao Te Ching, a Chinese classic text.

Noting that "psychedelia has begun to creep into the mainstream," Spin hailed lead singer Michael Quercio's "superb vocals" and "Mike Mariano's churchy keyboards," adding, "This group is definitely into making pure pop. Call it wimpy, unpretentious, joyous, retrograde, groovy, or uplifting, The Three O'Clock's music is going somewhere."

Reviewing a Chicago appearance on the band's tour for the album, Billboard acclaimed Michael Quercio as "an able craftsman of the pop hook," citing the band's "genially hallucinogenic ditties" and "a solid pop approach [that] keeps it from being classified solely as a "paisley underground" artifact."

The album was re-released on CD in 2002 on the Collectors' Choice label, paired on a single CD release with Ever After.

Arrive Without Travelling was later critically acclaimed as one of the "Top 200 power pop albums of all time," crediting Michael Quercio for "some of his sweetest melodies here, including the jaunty 'Half the Way There,' 'Another World' and the Scott Miller co-write 'The Girl with the Guitar (Says Oh Yeah).'"

The title of the song "The Girl with the Guitar" was inspired by Susanna Hoffs of the Bangles, and alluded to a Jan Vermeer painting, The Guitar Player (1672). The lyrics also include a reference to painter Henri Rousseau. Miller's version of the song, titled "Girl w/ a Guitar," appears as a bonus track on the 2014 CD reissue of Game Theory's 1985 album Real Nighttime.

== Track listing ==
Side A

1. "Her Head's Revolving" – 3.09
2. "Each and Every Lonely Heart" – 3.25
3. "Underwater" – 3.01
4. "Mrs. Green" – 2.52
5. "Hand in Hand" – 3.35
6. "Knowing When You Smile" – 2.41

Side B

1. "Half the Way There" – 3.29
2. "Simon in the Park (With Tentacles)" – 3.07
3. "Another World" – 3.13
4. "The Girl with the Guitar (Says Oh Yeah)" – 2.49
5. "Spun Gold" – 4.33

== Personnel ==
- Danny Benair – drums, vocals
- Louis Gutierrez – guitar, vocals, percussion
- Mike Mariano – keyboards, vocals
- Michael Quercio – lead vocals, bass guitar
- Martin McCarrick – cello
- Martin Ditcham – percussion
- Mike Hedges – producer
