= Vermillion (The Three O'Clock album) =

Studio album by the Three O'Clock
- Released: 1988
- Genre: Pop
- Label: Paisley Park
- Producer: Ian Ritchie

The Three O'Clock chronology
Ever After (1986)	Vermillion (1988)	Live at the Old Waldorf (2013)

Vermillion is an album by the American band the Three O'Clock, released in 1988. It was the band's fourth and final album. The album was released on Paisley Park Records; label founder Prince wrote "Neon Telephone", on which Wendy and Lisa sang. Vermillion was produced by Ian Ritchie. Jason Falkner joined the band on guitar.

== Critical reception ==
The Ottawa Citizen noted the band's "pursuit of real pop," writing that "sixties psychedelia, bits of folk harp and smooth harmonies are here, but unlike others, Three O'Clock knows when to stop."

== Track listing ==
Side A

1. "Vermillion" – 0.38
2. "Love Explosion" – 4.01
3. "To Be Where You Are" – 3.55
4. "When She Becomes My Girl" – 3.30
5. "World on Fire" – 3.31
6. "Neon Telephone" – 3.57

Side B

1. "On Paper" – 4.02
2. "Ways of Magic" – 4.08
3. "Time's Going Slower" – 3.19
4. "Love Has No Heart" – 4.24
5. "Through the Sleepy Town" – 6.02

== Personnel ==
- Danny Benair – drums, vocals
- Jason Falkner – guitar, vocals
- Mike Mariano – keyboards, vocals
- Michael Quercio – lead vocals, bass guitar
