= Donnette Thayer =

American musician

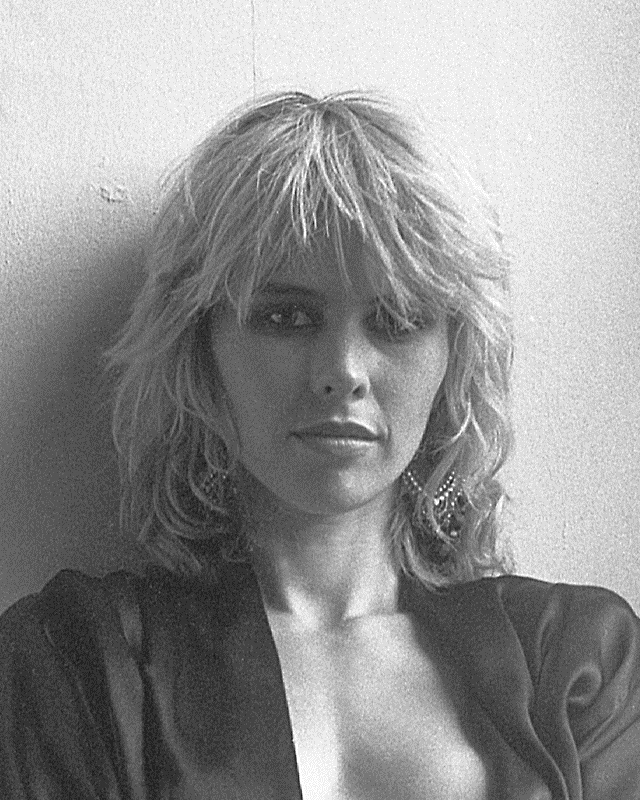
- Donnette Thayer in 1983

Background information
- Born: Donnette Ruth Thayer; January 1958 (age 68)
- Genres: Power pop, alternative rock, dream pop
- Instruments: Guitar, vocals

Donnette Ruth Thayer is a vocalist, guitarist, and songwriter most active in the 1980s and early 1990s indie rock scenes of Northern California. Thayer was a member of the band Game Theory, and later formed Hex with Steve Kilbey of the Church.

She has been described by Bucketfull of Brains magazine as "the enchantress," and by radio trade journal The Hard Report as "Gaea personified," while Trouser Press Record Guide described her work as "a suave (post-paisley?) successor to California flower-pop."

== Biography ==
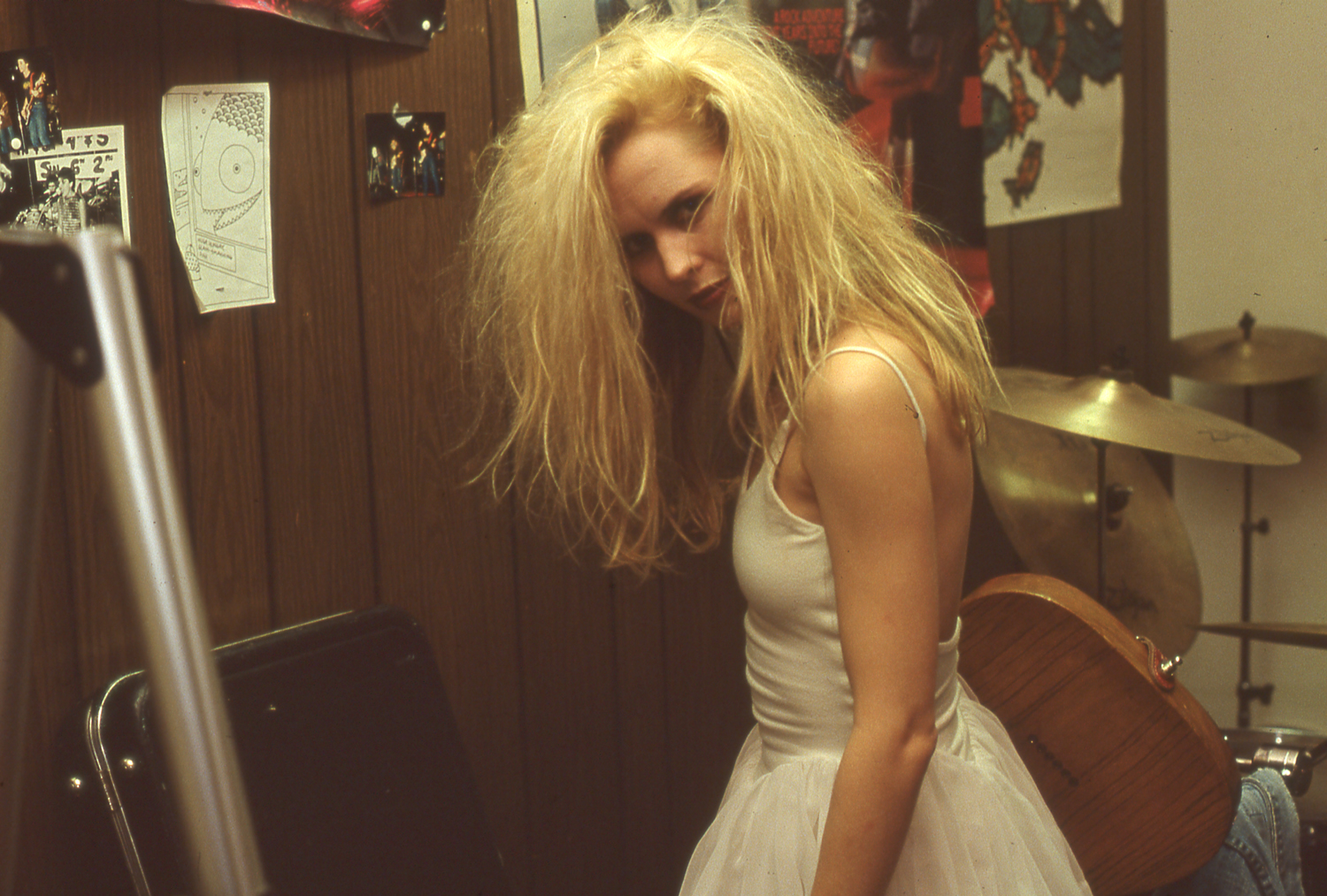
Thayer in Game Theory rehearsal studio

=== Early musical career ===
Thayer began her musical career in the late 1970s in Davis, California, as guitarist and vocalist for X-Men. She later formed The Veil, which released one album, 1000 Dreams Have Told Me (1984), produced by Scott Miller of Game Theory. In the mid-1980s, Thayer moved to the San Francisco Bay Area, and formed a short-lived band called No Matter What, which included guitarist Zachary Smith, bassist Daniel Liston Keller, and drummer B Jon Chinburg.

=== Game Theory ===
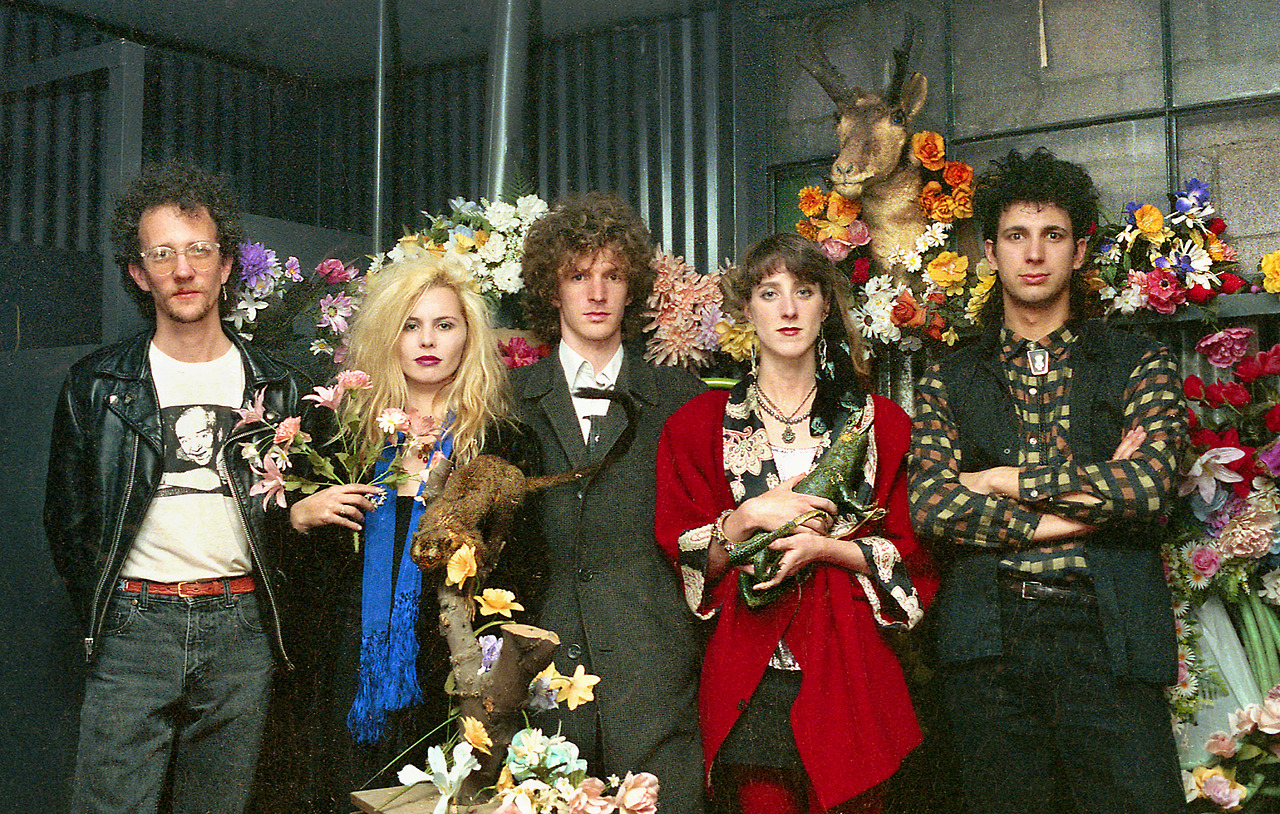
Game Theory in Arizona, 1988, during Two Steps from the Middle Ages tour. L-R: Gil Ray, Thayer, Miller, Shelley LaFreniere, Gui Gassuan.

In 1986, Thayer joined power pop/college rock band Game Theory as a guitarist and vocalist. She had previously appeared as a guest performer on the band's debut album, Blaze of Glory (1982).

With Game Theory, Thayer recorded the cult classic double album Lolita Nation (1987), and toured extensively promoting the album. Thayer wrote the song "Look Away" (originally performed with her earlier band, X-Men), and is credited as co-writer of "Mammoth Gardens" and "Not Because You Can." She also played on Game Theory's subsequent album, Two Steps from the Middle Ages (1988). Following a promotional tour for the release of Two Steps, Thayer left the band in 1988.

=== Hex ===
In 1988, Thayer teamed up with Steve Kilbey of Australian psychedelic rock band The Church, to create the band Hex. Kilbey and Thayer were romantically involved at the time – Kilbey's nickname for Thayer was "Starfish," which became the title of The Church's album Starfish. Starfish featured the single "Under The Milky Way," a top 40 hit for the Church on the US Billboard Hot 100.

==== Hex (1989) ====
Hex, the 1989 self-titled debut album by the duo, was originally released on First Warning, then on Rykodisc. Kilbey's biographer has described this collaboration as "one of the most inspired and artistically rewarding collaborations of Steve's career. The arrangements for many of the songs were spare – often consisting of softly strummed acoustic guitars, ambient keyboard textures, and tasteful electronic percussion – which allowed her voice to float up through the wide open spaces like smoke."

According to AllMusic critic Ned Raggett, the debut album "somehow gets the mood right from the start, that lovely end-of-the-'80s psych-pop/indie or whatever groove that had defined much of the underground music of that era." Raggett called it "lovely to hear how well they go together, Thayer's voice just tripped out and intoxicating enough, Kilbey's arrangements suiting the mood well," noting that other than a guest drummer on one track, "the two create everything themselves and do a lovely job", creating a "rainy/sunny rural-afternoon glaze throughout Hex, a wonderful way to spend some time with music."

==== Vast Halos (1990) ====
Vast Halos
Review scores
Source	Rating
AllMusic	4/5 stars

The Kilbey-Thayer duo returned to the studio to produce their second Hex recording, Vast Halos, released in 1990, with guest percussionist Jim McGrath credited for "pounding, shaking, and apple eating."

Vast Halos featured the "same combination of swoony psychedelia and new wave-tinged compositions" as Hex, but was cited as "a varied and intriguing effort that overtops its predecessor with skill and style." According to AllMusic's Raggett, "Thayer's singing is more direct at many points, sounding fuller in the mix and in her general delivery... when the group takes a more organic approach, as with the Indian-sounding percussion on the really lovely 'Centaur,' Thayer's singing is some of her most seductive and thrilling and the results are truly special."

=== Solo career ===
In 1997, Thayer released a solo album, Chaos and Wonder, on Escapist Music.

Thayer contributed vocals and lyrics to the song "Peregrine," music by Tony Pucci and Stefan Horlitz, for the ALS charity CD Songs for Jenny, released on Heyday Records in October 2009. The Songs for Jenny CD also featured vocal performances by Tim Powles of The Church and Margot Smith, among others.

In 2014, Thayer recorded a version of the Scott Miller song "The Red Baron," which originally appeared on Game Theory's 1984 EP Distortion. Her version, released as a music video in June 2014, is expected to appear on an upcoming Scott Miller memorial tribute album.

== Discography ==
With X-Men:

- Satisfaction Guaranteed (EP, 1982)

With The Veil:

- 1000 Dreams Have Told Me (1984)

With Game Theory:

- Lolita Nation (1987)
- Two Steps from the Middle Ages (1988)

With Hex:

- Hex (1989)
- Vast Halos (1990)
- March (promotional 12" EP, 1990)

Solo releases:

- Chaos and Wonder (1997)
