= Lolita Nation =

Studio album by Game Theory
- Released: December 1, 1987
- Recorded: 1987
- Genre: Alternative rock, power pop
- Length: 74:06
- Label: Enigma Records
- Producer: Mitch Easter

Game Theory chronology
The Big Shot Chronicles (1986)	Lolita Nation (1987)	Two Steps from the Middle Ages (1988)

Lolita Nation is the fourth full-length album by Game Theory, a California power pop band fronted by guitarist and singer-songwriter Scott Miller. Originally released in 1987 as a double LP, the album was reissued by Omnivore Recordings in February 2016 as a double CD set with 21 bonus tracks.

== Background and production ==
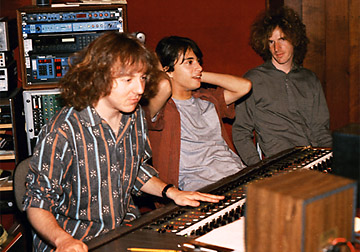
Mitch Easter (far left) producing Lolita Nation with Michael Quercio and Scott Miller

For Game Theory's October–November 1986 national tour supporting the release of The Big Shot Chronicles, the band took on two new members, resulting in the line-up of Scott Miller (lead vocal, guitars), Shelley LaFreniere (keyboards), Gil Ray (drums), Guillaume Gassuan (bass), and Donnette Thayer (backing vocal, guitars). Thayer, who was then Miller's girlfriend, had been a guest musician on Game Theory's first album, Blaze of Glory. This iteration of the band recorded two albums, Lolita Nation (1987) and Two Steps from the Middle Ages (1988).

In 1988, Miller told the San Francisco Chronicle that with Lolita Nation, he "wanted to throw away some of the givens", labeling the music "experimental pop." "It's meant to have a lot of unexpected things happening on it without being abrasive or industrial." In an earlier interview, Miller explained that he had chosen to record a double album essentially "because people kind of hate that idea. It was more fun to do this big, sprawling mess of an album that people don't quite know what to do with. I think it's good for people's souls." He characterized Lolita Nation as "psychologically intensive", and speculated, "I suppose people will say 'sixties-influenced' – they always do."

When asked about the album title's relation to Vladimir Nabokov's novel Lolita, Miller admitted that although he had read Nabokov's Pale Fire, he had never actually finished the book Lolita, which he found "too relentless." He had instead drawn upon the 1962 film version of Lolita for the album's title concept:

I knew all I needed to know for my appropriation of the concept to work for me. In my midtwenties I felt powerless and persecuted. What did the world want me for? The title made me think of an entire generation of Lolitas: someone—our parents? God?—needed us to be there, but the need felt neurotic and uncompassionate. In "We Love You Carol and Alison" (my favorite Game Theory song) I'm trying to express that teen alienation thing that the kids go for, but I'm also fishing around for a basis of proper adulthood.

== 2016 reissue ==
Although it had garnered little commercial success upon its release, copies of Lolita Nation became a highly sought-after collector's item after Game Theory's catalog went out of print in the early 1990s. The unavailability of Game Theory material for over two decades had contributed to the band's inability to transcend what Miller described as "national obscurity, as opposed to regional obscurity."

In February 2016, nearly 30 years after its initial release on Enigma, Lolita Nation was remastered and reissued by Omnivore Recordings, with 21 bonus tracks that included the previously unreleased full 8-minute version of "Chardonnay," alternate mixes of other album tracks, and live covers of songs by artists such as David Bowie, the Modern Lovers, and the Sex Pistols. Omnivore also released the album as a double LP in a limited edition on dark green translucent vinyl, with later releases to be on black vinyl, containing a download card for all 48 tracks of the CD edition.

New liner notes included interviews with the band and original album contributors, notes from Okkervil River's Will Sheff, and previously unreleased photos by Robert Toren.

== Critical reception and reviews ==
Professional ratings
Review scores
Source	Rating
AllMusic	4.5/5 stars
Blurt	4/5 stars
Mojo	4/5 stars
Philadelphia Inquirer	4/4 stars
PopMatters	9/10
Uncut (UK)	9/10

Generally considered the group's most critically acclaimed work, the album was nominated in 1988 for a Bay Area Music Award (BAMMY) in the category of Outstanding Independent Label Album or EP.

In its review of the double LP, Spin cited Lolita Nation as "some of the gutsiest, most distinctive rock 'n' roll heard in 1987," with "sumptuous melodic hooks ... played with startling intensity and precision," while simultaneously noting that the band "elected to shinny way out on an aesthetic limb" with "a thoroughly perplexing conglomeration of brief instrumental shards and stabs".

Trouser Press called the album "ambitious and occasionally bizarre" with "crazy noises," writing that the new line-up "works wonders some of the time but falls flat in spots," and adding that Thayer sang "commendable lead on a few tunes, but isn't the strong counterpoint to Miller that would prevent the onset of listening fatigue."

Mark Deming of AllMusic noted that the album contains "more than a few flat-out brilliant tracks", while William Ham, writing for Dancing About Architecture, praised its emotional impact, insularity, and melodic virtuosity. Ham also likened Scott Miller's lyric writing to "vintage" Elvis Costello, with phrases that "careen all over the place verbally yet somehow manage to plug directly into the emotions."

Chicago Reader's Peter Margasak cited the album's "artistic ambition, with all sorts of cool fragments and sonic experiments scattered among its sophisticated pop songs."

Rock critic Joe Harrington placed Lolita Nation at #4 on his list of the Top 100 albums of all time, while Omar Ghieth of Culturespill called it flatly "the greatest album of all time."

Reviewing the 2016 CD reissue, Deming praised the audio as a significant improvement over the original, with "more satisfying low end and a wealth of detail" that had been difficult to hear in the original's "slightly brittle" sound. Among the bonus tracks, Deming found that the selection of cover versions delivered insight into "the many sounds that informed Miller's musical world-view", which combined with an "excellent oral history" in the liner notes to yield "the definitive presentation of an overlooked classic of '80s pop."

== Track listing ==
All songs written by Scott Miller except where noted.

=== Vinyl version ===
Side 1
No.	Title	Length
1.	"Kenneth – What's the Frequency?"	0:43
2.	"Not Because You Can" (S. Miller/ D. Thayer)	3:05
3.	"Shard"	0:21
4.	"Go Ahead, You're Dying To"	0:37
5.	"Dripping with Looks"	4:00
6.	"Exactly What We Don't Want to Hear"	0:58
7.	"We Love You Carol and Alison"	3:25
8.	"The Waist and the Knees"	6:02
Total length:		19:11

Side 2
No.	Title	Length
1.	"Nothing New"	4:27
2.	"The World's Easiest Job"	1:33
3.	"Look Away" (D. Thayer)	3:21
4.	"Slip"	3:42
5.	"The Real Sheila"	3:34
6.	"Andy in Ten Years"	4:40
Total length:		21:17

Side 3
No.	Title	Length
1.	"Watch Who You're Calling Space Garbage Meteor Mouth"	0:15
2.	"Pretty Green Card Shark"	0:04
3.	"Where They Have to Let You In" (G. Ray)	2:29
4.	"Turn Me On Dead Man"	0:30
5.	"Mammoth Gardens" (D. Thayer/S. Miller)	4:05
6.	"Little Ivory"	3:17
7.	"Museum of Hopelessness"	0:11
8.	"Toby Ornette" (S. LaFreniere)	2:28
9.	"All Clockwork and No Bodily Fluids Makes Hal a Dull Metal Humbert"	0:23
10.	"In Heaven Every Elephant Baby Wants to Be So Full of Sting"	0:33
11.	"Paul Simon in the Park with Canticle"	0:15
12.	"But You Can't Pick Your Friends"	0:04
13.	"Vacuum Genesis"	0:09
14.	"DEFMACROS"	0:01
15.	"HOWSOMETH"	0:02
16.	"INGDOTIME"	0:01
17.	"SALENGTH0S"	0:02
18.	"OMETHINGL"	0:01
19.	"ETBFOLLOW"	0:02
20.	"AAFTERNOO"	0:01
21.	"NGETPRESE"	0:02
22.	"NTMOMENTI"	0:01
23.	"FTHINGSWO"	0:02
24.	"NTALWAYSB"	0:01
25.	"ETHISWAYT"	0:02
26.	"BCACAUSEA"	0:01
27.	"BWASTEAFT"	0:02
28.	"ERNOONWHE"	0:01
29.	"NEQBMERET"	0:02
30.	"URNFROMSH"	0:01
31.	"OWLITTLEG"	0:02
32.	"REENPLACE"	0:01
33.	"27"	0:02
34.	"One More for Saint Michael"	3:49
35.	"Choose Between Two Sons"	1:30
Total length:		20:32

Side 4
No.	Title	Length
1.	"Chardonnay"	4:26
2.	"Last Day That We're Young"	5:13
3.	"Together Now, Very Minor"	3:25
Total length:		13:04

=== CD re-release ===
Disc 1
No.	Title	Length
1.	"Kenneth – What's the Frequency?"	0:46
2.	"Not Because You Can" (S. Miller/ D. Thayer)	3:04
3.	"Shard"	0:22
4.	"Go Ahead, You're Dying To"	0:37
5.	"Dripping with Looks"	4:00
6.	"Exactly What We Don't Want to Hear"	1:01
7.	"We Love You Carol and Alison"	3:27
8.	"The Waist and the Knees"	6:08
9.	"Nothing New"	4:21
10.	"The World's Easiest Job"	1:38
11.	"Look Away" (D. Thayer)	3:20
12.	"Slip"	3:35
13.	"The Real Sheila"	3:35
14.	"Andy in Ten Years"	3:50
15.	"Watch Who You're Calling Space Garbage Meteor Mouth / Pretty Green Card Shark"	0:18
16.	"Where They Have to Let You In" (G. Ray)	2:27
17.	"Turn Me On Dead Man"	0:28
18.	"Mammoth Gardens" (D. Thayer/S. Miller)	4:02
19.	"Little Ivory"	3:17
20.	"Museum of Hopelessness"	0:10
21.	"Toby Ornette" (S. LaFreniere)	2:29
22.	"All Clockwork and No Bodily Fluids Makes Hal a Dull Metal Humbert / In Heaven Every Elephant Baby Wants to Be So Full of Sting / Paul Simon in the Park with Canticle / But You Can't Pick Your Friends / Vacuum Genesis / DEFMACROS / HOWSOMETH / INGDOTIME / SALENGTH0S / OMETHINGL / ETBFOLLOW / AAFTERNOO / NGETPRESE / NTMOMENTI / FTHINGSWO / NTALWAYSB / ETHISWAYT / BCACAUSEA / BWASTEAFT / ERNOONWHE / NEQBMERET / URNFROMSH / OWLITTLEG / REENPLACE / 27"	1:54
23.	"One More for Saint Michael"	3:50
24.	"Choose Between Two Sons"	1:32
25.	"Chardonnay"	4:28
26.	"Last Day That We're Young"	5:07
27.	"Together Now, Very Minor"	3:29

Disc 2 (2016 Omnivore reissue, bonus tracks)
No.	Title	Length
28.	"Chardonnay (Long Version)"
29.	"Dripping with Looks (Rough Mix w/Alternate Vocal)"
30.	"One More for Saint Michael (Live)"
31.	"Carrie Anne (Live)" (T. Hicks / A. Clarke / G. Nash)
32.	"The Waist and the Knees (Rehearsal Demo)"
33.	"Tiny Steps (Radio Session)" (Elvis Costello)
34.	"We Love You Carol and Alison (Radio Session)"
35.	"Gimme Danger (Radio Session)" (Iggy Pop / J. Williamson)
36.	"Love Will Tear Us Apart (Live)" (Joy Division)
37.	"Andy in Ten Years (Rough Mix w/ Alternate Vocal)"
38.	"Candidate (Live)" (David Bowie)
39.	"Little Ivory (Rehearsal Demo)"
40.	"These Things Take Time (Radio Session)" (Morrissey / J. Marr)
41.	"Roadrunner (Live)" (J. Richman)
42.	"One More for Saint Michael (Rough Mix w/ Alternate Vocal)"
43.	"God Save the Queen (Radio Session)" (P. Cook / S. Jones / G. Matlock / J. Rotten)
44.	"Drive-In Saturday (Radio Session)" (David Bowie)
45.	"Public Image (Live)" (Public Image Ltd.)
46.	"The Waist and the Knees (Rough Mix w/ Alternate Vocal)"
47.	"Together Now, Very Minor (Radio Session)"
48.	"Choose Between Two Sons"

== Personnel ==
- Scott Miller – guitar, vocals
- Guillaume Gassuan – bass, backing vocals
- Shelley LaFreniere – synthesizers, backing vocals
- Gil Ray – drums, backing vocals, guitar
- Donnette Thayer – guitar, backing vocals, lead vocals on "Look Away" and "Mammoth Gardens"
- Mitch Easter – producer, engineer
- Robert Toren – bass guitar on "Toby Ornette"
- Eric Marshall – electronic bass drum on "The Waist And The Knees"
- Zachary Smith – guitar samples on "The Waist And The Knees"
- Bob Geller – assistant engineer
