= Two Steps from the Middle Ages =

Studio album by Game Theory
- Released: 1988
- Recorded: 1988
- Genre: Alternative rock; power pop
- Length: 41:38
- Label: Enigma Records; Omnivore Recordings
- Producer: Mitch Easter

Game Theory chronology
Lolita Nation (1987)	Two Steps from the Middle Ages (1988)	Tinker to Evers to Chance (1990)

Professional ratings
Review scores
Source	Rating
AllMusic	4/5 stars
PopMatters	7/10 stars

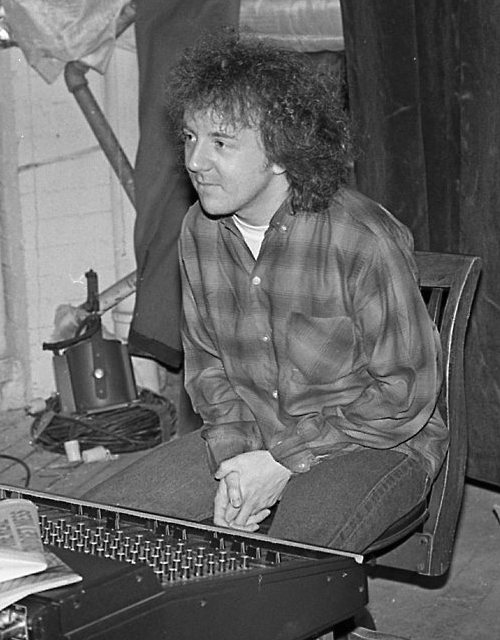
Mitch Easter producing Two Steps from the Middle Ages in San Francisco, 1988

Two Steps from the Middle Ages (1988) is the fifth studio album by power pop band Game Theory.

After having been out of print for nearly 30 years, the album was reissued by Omnivore Recordings in June 2017 on translucent orange vinyl, and as a CD with 11 bonus tracks. The release included a booklet featuring new essays by Mitch Easter, Ken Stringfellow, and critic Franklin Bruno.

== History ==
Miller intended the album to be "a more straightforward, singles-based record" than its predecessor, Lolita Nation, according to PopMatters.

The title of the song "Room For One More, Honey" was a reference to an episode of the American television program The Twilight Zone titled Twenty Two. According to guitarist Donnette Thayer, the serendipitous addition of the sound of clinking wine glasses to "Room for One More, Honey" stood out to her, years later, "because it symbolizes so much of what I loved about Scott's writing and what we did as members of Game Theory," in that the group's "glasses may seem empty by traditional standards — but this was unimportant to us... We had different objectives."

The album's title has at least a double meaning (referring to both dance steps from the historical period known as the Middle Ages as well as to a person who is "two steps" from middle age) and comes from an alternating rhyme in the fifth track:

Unfolding their defense in stages
Harshest critics can't refuse
Two steps from the middle ages
Rose details and ruby shoes

After the group was disbanded in 1990, leader Scott Miller went on to form The Loud Family. Game Theory would not release another album until Supercalifragile came out in 2017, four years after Miller's death.

In 2012, the song "Rolling with the Moody Girls" was covered by Home Blitz on their EP Frozen Track.

== Reception ==
According to Option's Jason Cohen, "Game Theory went out with more of a whimper than a blast" with Two Steps from the Middle Ages.

In contrast, PopMatters wrote in its review of the 2017 reissue, "The band as a whole plays more aggressively on the album's songs, from [Gil] Ray's muted yet driving drum pulse that opens the album through [Shelley] LaFreniere's heavier, more ominous keyboard contributions. Miller's guitar playing is less foregrounded than on previous albums, allowing space for his bandmates to fill the sound." Reviewer Ed Whitelock added that the album "point[ed] forward towards what would, by 1993, become fashionable under the 'alternative' label. One can hear echoes of Game Theory's trailblazing in many of the bands that enjoyed success in the early '90s, including Belly and, especially, Smashing Pumpkins."

The Big Takeover's Elizabeth Klisiewicz placed the album in the context of Scott Miller's breakup with Donnette Thayer and his self-admitted depression, finding that a pervasive "feeling of melancholy ... resides within the tracks, complex and beautiful as they are." In her assessment,

"What the Whole World Wants" is another gem of a tune, with one of Scott's catchiest hooks at its core ... "Amelia, Have You Lost" has some tasty guitar licks and recaptures some of the magic from the group’s earlier releases. "Rolling With the Moody Girls" bears that trademark Mitch Easter sound, with solidly placed percussion and guitar and keyboards sparkling through the mix. There is even a saxophone at one point. In hindsight, this is easily one of the album’s strongest tracks, with a captivating melody and some fine singing. ... "You Drive" reprises a melodic idea from an earlier record, but it’s sent up in grand fashion here with some excellent guitar playing and a hook that never leaves you. Brilliant! "Leilani" has a plethora of pop culture references and is another keeper. It moves slower in waltz time and it suits the group well. "Wish I Could Stand or Have" has lovely 12 string acoustic and heartbreaking lyrics. Its brevity does not dispel its desperation. "Throwing The Election" has a proggy feel due to the organ, before it jumps forward into a gorgeous tune with pointed lyrics.

== Track listing ==
All tracks are written by Scott Miller, except as noted.

No.	Title	Length
1.	"Room for One More, Honey"	3:03
2.	"What the Whole World Wants"	4:29
3.	"The Picture of Agreeability"	0:57
4.	"Amelia, Have You Lost"	3:23
5.	"Rolling with the Moody Girls"	3:09
6.	"Wyoming"	3:24
7.	"In a Delorean"	3:11
8.	"You Drive"	4:09
9.	"Leilani"	3:02
10.	"Wish I Could Stand or Have"	1:59
11.	"Don't Entertain Me Twice"	3:59
12.	"Throwing the Election"	4:16
13.	"Initiations Week"	2:29

Bonus tracks
No.	Title	Writer(s)	Length
14.	"Together Now, Very Minor" (live)		3:04
15.	"Amelia, Have You Lost" (demo)		3:14
16.	"Bad Machinery" (radio session)	Mitch Easter	2:17
17.	"Room for One More, Honey" (demo)		3:04
18.	"The Waist and the Knees" (live)		6:22
19.	"Wish I Could Stand or Have" (demo)		1:52
20.	"Rolling with the Moody Girls" (demo)		3:13
21.	"America" (demo)	Simon & Garfunkel	3:52
22.	"I Turned Her Away" (radio session)		3:13
23.	"Wyoming" (rough mix)		3:20
24.	"Sleeping Through Heaven" (live)		5:01

== Personnel ==
- Guillaume Gassuan - bass and backing vocals
- Gil Ray - drums, backing vocals and guitar
- Donnette Thayer - guitar and vocals
- Shelley LaFreniere - synthesizers and backing vocals
- Scott Miller - vocals and guitar
