= Keith Slettedahl =

American musician (born 1973)

- Born: August 9, 1973 (age 52); Granada Hills, California, U.S.
- Genres: Pop, rock, indie rock
- Occupations: Musician, Songwriter
- Instruments: Vocals, Guitar, Piano
- Years active: 1999–present
- Member of: The 88

Keith Konrad Slettedahl (born August 9, 1973) is an American musician. He is the singer and songwriter for Los Angeles pop rock group The 88, known for the song "At Least It Was Here", the theme song for Community. In 2006, he appeared in the episode "Best Prom Ever" on the sitcom How I Met Your Mother.
