= Adam Merrin =

American musician (active 2003– )

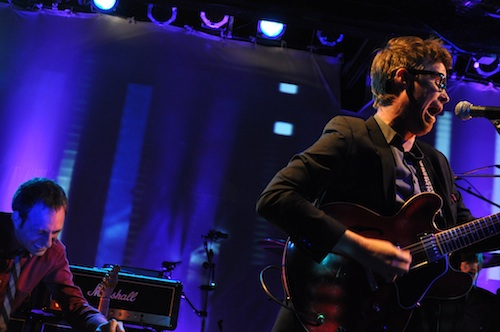
- Adam Merrin performing with The 88

Background information
- Origin: Los Angeles, California
- Genres: Rock, pop
- Years active: 2003–present
- Labels: Natural Energy Lab
- Members: Adam Merrin

Adam Merrin is an American singer-songwriter and producer. He is the keyboardist for the Los Angeles–based rock band The 88, and later joined The Three O'Clock. Songs from Merrin's solo work have been featured on Grey's Anatomy, The Big C, Kyle XY, How I Met Your Mother, Greek, The L.A. Complex, Bones, Necessary Roughness, Reaper, Newport Harbor: The Real Orange County, and in the film The Haunting Hour Volume One: Don't Think About It.

== Solo discography ==
Albums

- Have Another One (2009) Natural Energy Lab

EPs

- Have One (2007) Natural Energy Lab

== Awards ==
In 2011, Merrin's song, "Still Alright" won "Best Song in a Television show" for "Necessary Roughness" at the Hollywood Music in Media Awards.

== The 88 ==
Merrin produced, mixed, and engineered The 88's 2003 debut CD, Kind of Light, and the group won the LA Weekly award for Best Pop/Rock Band that year. Kind of Light was also featured as Radio & Records Album of the Week. The group released seven full-length albums, were the backing band for the Ray Davies Fall 2011 US Tour, and opened for acts like The Smashing Pumpkins, The B-52's, Elliott Smith, and Flaming Lips. Their track "At Least It Was Here" is the opening theme song for the television series Community.

== Producer credits ==
- Kind of Light (June 2003) EMK/Mootron Records

In 2014, Merrin produced Heavy Metal Anthem 's debut EP. Their song "Say Tonight" was featured on NBC's About A Boy. Adam's production credits also include Laura Jane Scott. One of the songs they recorded together, "The Librarian", was featured on ABC's Castle.

== Co-producer credits ==
Albums with The 88

- This Must Be Love (November 2009) 88 Records
- The 88 (September 2010) 88 Records
- Fortune Teller (June 2013) 88 Records
- Close To You (December 2016) 88 Records

Eps with The 88

- No One Here (February 2010) 88 Records
- Actors (March 2012) 88 Records

Singles with The 88

- All I Want For Christmas Is You (November 2009) 88 Records
- Love Is The Thing (June 2009) 88 Records

== Additional recordings ==
Adam has recorded piano with Ray Davies, Matt Costa, Rusty Anderson, and 311.
