= The Three O'Clock =

American alternative rock group

- Also known as: The Salvation Army
- Origin: Los Angeles, California, U.S.
- Genres: Alternative rock, Paisley Underground
- Years active: 1981–1988, 2013–2019
- Labels: Frontier, Paisley Park/Warner Bros. Records, IRS, Omnivore
- Past members: Michael Quercio; John Blazing; Troy Howell; Louis Gutierrez; Danny Benair] Mike Mariano; Steven Altenberg; Jason Falkner; Adam Merrin

The Three O'Clock is an American alternative rock group associated with the Los Angeles 1980s Paisley Underground scene. Lead singer and bassist Michael Quercio is credited with coining the term "Paisley Underground" to describe a subset of the 1980s L.A. music scene which included bands such as the Dream Syndicate, Rain Parade, Green on Red, the Long Ryders and the Bangles.

== History ==
=== Formation and early years ===
The Three O'Clock originally formed under the name the Salvation Army in 1981. The original lineup included Quercio (lead vocals, bass), John Blazing (guitar), and Troy Howell (drums). They released a single ("Mind Gardens" b/w "Happen Happened") on the Minutemen's New Alliance label in November 1981. At this juncture, Quercio (then billed as "Ricky Start") was the band's sole songwriter, and the group played in a psychedelic pop-punk style.

By the end of the year, Blazing left and was replaced by Gregg Gutierrez, later known as Louis Gutierrez. Quercio reverted to his real name, and this lineup of the Salvation Army signed with LA independent label Frontier Records and released a self-titled debut LP in May 1982.

=== Early success ===
In the summer of 1982, legal problems with the actual Salvation Army forced the band to change their name. "The Three O'Clock" came from the time of day the band rehearsed. Almost exactly coincident with the August 1982 name change, Howell left the band and Mike Mariano (keyboards, ex-Great Buildings, ex-the Falcons) and Danny Benair (drums, ex-the Quick, ex-the Weirdos, ex-Choir Invisible, ex-the Falcons) joined. Frontier would later reissue the Salvation Army LP under the group name Befour Three O'Clock in 1986, and again in 1992.

Still signed to Frontier, the band issued the Baroque Hoedown EP, their debut release as the Three O'Clock, in late 1982. The EP was followed by an LP in 1984 entitled Sixteen Tambourines. Both Frontier releases were produced by Earle Mankey. The Three O'Clock had developed into a power-pop ensemble with 1960s garage band influences. Quercio and Gutierrez co-wrote almost all the band's material, with occasional assists from Mariano. They received airplay in Southern California, notably on influential LA station KROQ-FM. "Jet Fighter" from Sixteen Tambourines became a national college radio hit.

=== The I.R.S./Paisley Park years: 1984–88 ===
The Three O'Clock signed to I.R.S. Records for their next album, 1985's Arrive Without Travelling. Producer Mike Hedges recorded the album in Germany. The band had a minor hit with "Her Head's Revolving", whose video received regular airplay on MTV. "Half the Way There" was also released as a 12-inch single, and featured a Motown style drumbeat and rich harmonies.

In 1986, guitarist Steven Altenberg replaced Gutierrez for Ever After, produced by Ian Broudie. Quercio once again was the band's chief songwriter. "Suzie's on the Ball Now" was the single, which gained minor airplay on stations like KROQ-FM in Los Angeles.

In 1988, Altenberg departed the band's ranks, and Benair placed an advertisement in the Los Angeles magazine The Recycler, in order to find a new guitar player for the Three O'Clock. Coincidentally, that ad – which read, "Three O'Clock looking for guitarist. No metal, no country, no flakes" – ran in the same issue as one placed by Jason Falkner, who was "looking for like minded people to start the best band in the world with me." Falkner, who had been playing Three O'Clock songs in his previous band, called the number in the ad, came in to audition, and according to Benair, "we hit it off right away. We auditioned two people. For one moment we considered becoming a five piece, but Jason got the gig."

The new line-up of the Three O'Clock soon entered the studio to record the Ian Ritchie-produced Vermillion, on Warner Bros. Records by way of Prince's Paisley Park Records imprint. "Prince was aware of us from Arrive Without Travelling and the "Her Head's Revolving" video," said Benair. "The Bangles told us he was a fan, and when we were off IRS, he sent a label person to see us live." Prince himself contributed a song, "Neon Telephone," to Vermillion under the pseudonym Joey Coco. The album was a critical and commercial failure, and did not dent the charts. It was the last Three O'Clock studio album.

=== Breakup and aftermath: 1989–2012 ===
The Three O'Clock disbanded shortly after the release of Vermillion.

- Michael Quercio briefly joined Game Theory in 1990. Thereafter, he founded Permanent Green Light, who released two albums, and, later, the Jupiter Affect. Quercio continues to play in L.A. pop bands.
- Louis Gutierrez played with Louis and Clark and then became a principal member of Mary's Danish.
- Danny Benair went to work for various record labels, later founding the Natural Energy Lab, a Los Angeles-based music marketing company, which specializes in film, television and commercial placement.
- Jason Falkner joined Jellyfish, then the Grays, before launching a successful solo record career in the mid-1990s.
- Troy Howell started the group the Eyes of Mind, who recorded on Bomp Records. He also played with Cee Farrow and the band OOSoul (double oh soul).

Arrive Without Travelling and Ever After were released in 2002 on a single CD.

=== 2013 revival ===
After 25 years of turning down reunion offers, the Three O'Clock reformed after being presented with a chance to play at the 2013 Coachella Festival. Three quarters of the "classic" line-up – Michael Quercio (vocals/bass), Louis Gutierrez (guitars) & Danny Benair (drums) – were joined by new recruit Adam Merrin (keyboards). The group played both weekends of the Coachella Festival, and also played on Conan on April 10, 2013. They later embarked on a mini-tour, and released several archival recordings that same year. The final show of the tour was at Fingerprints, a record store in Long Beach, California, on June 24, 2013.

In December 2013, the Three O'Clock played two nights with three other reunited Paisley Underground bands – the Bangles, the Dream Syndicate, and Rain Parade – at The Fillmore in San Francisco (Dec. 5) and The Fonda Theatre in Los Angeles (Dec. 6 benefit concert). The band played shows on widely scattered occasions over the next few years.

Three new recordings by the Three O'Clock were released in November 2018 as part of a compilation album called 3 × 4, which also included the Dream Syndicate, the Bangles, and Rain Parade, with each of the four bands covering songs by the other bands. Following the initial Record Store Day First release as a double album on "psychedelic swirl" purple vinyl, Yep Roc Records released the album on LP, CD, and digital in February 2019.

The reunited band remained sporadically active through early 2019, continuing to perform in and around Southern California. The Three O'Clock have not performed since May 2019, though there has been no announcement of a group break-up. In the interim, Quercio has been active as a member of the revived band Permanent Green Light, which has played live dates and released a single.

== Discography ==
=== Albums ===
as the Salvation Army

- The Salvation Army (1982) Frontier Records

as Befour Three O'Clock

- Befour Three O'Clock (1986) – reissue of Salvation Army LP
- Happen Happened (1992) – CD reissue of Salvation Army LP, plus 9 bonus tracks

as The Three O'Clock

- Baroque Hoedown (1982 EP, Frontier Records)
- Sixteen Tambourines (1983, Frontier Records)
- Arrive Without Travelling (1985, I.R.S. Records)
- Ever After (1986, I.R.S. Records)
- Vermillion (1988, Paisley Park Records)
- Live at the Old Waldorf (2013, Burger Records)
- The Hidden World Revealed (2013 compilation, Omnivore Recordings)
- 3 × 4 (2018 compilation, Yep Roc Records) #27 Billboard Independent Albums

=== Rarities ===
- "Regina Caeli" – 7-inch one-sided single (fan club release, Christmas 1986)
