= From Ritual to Romance (album) =

2002 album by The Loud Family

Live album by the Loud Family
- Released: September 24, 2002
- Recorded: October 5, 1996; August 8, 1998
- Genre: Rock, power pop
- Length: 54:11
- Label: 125 Records
- Producer: Scott Miller

The Loud Family chronology
| Attractive Nuisance (2000) | From Ritual to Romance (2002) | What If It Works? (2006) |

From Ritual to Romance is the Loud Family's sixth full-length album. It is a live album released during a six-year hiatus from studio recording, which followed the expiration of the group's recording contract with Alias Records in 2000.

== Background ==
Scott Miller, the band's founder and frontman, signed with independent recording label 125 Records after the expiration of the Loud Family's contract with Alias Records. The album was the fifth release by the then newly formed label, founded in 2001 by Joe Mallon and Sue Trowbridge, who had a long acquaintance with Miller and his bands.

== Music ==
From Ritual to Romance includes live recordings of two performances at different points in the band's history. The first performance, on tracks 1–7 and 14–19, is from a Hotel Utah show on October 5, 1996. Drummer Dawn Richardson had recently left the group, and for the 1996 tour supporting the release of Interbabe Concern, she was replaced by Mike Tittel, currently leader of the Ohio-based band New Sincerity Works.

The second performance, on tracks 8–13 and 20–21, is from a show at the Bottom of the Hill in San Francisco on August 8, 1998, after the release of the album Days for Days.

The album includes cover versions of "Debaser" by The Pixies, "When You Sleep" by My Bloody Valentine and "Here Come The Warm Jets" by Brian Eno.

The songs "Not Because You Can," "Go Ahead You're Dying To," and "Curse of the Frontier Land" are The Loud Family's versions of songs from Game Theory, Miller's previous band.

The songs listed as "Nine", "Five" and "Eleven" are three of the untitled soundscapes from The Loud Family's 1998 studio album Days for Days. The numbered titles reflect track numbers on Days for Days, in which conventionally titled songs are alternated with untitled tracks that amplify themes of the songs that they follow. On Days for Days, track 9 follows "Way Too Helpful," track 5 follows "Good, There Are No Lions in the Street," and track 11 follows "Mozart Sonatas."

== Critical response ==
Professional ratings
Review scores
| Source | Rating |
|---|---|
| AllMusic | 4/5 stars |

Writing in the Boston Phoenix, critic Brett Milano called the album "typically unconventional, drawing on their most obscure album tracks," and featuring the band's "usual blend of finely crafted pop hooks, elusive yet resonant lyrics, male-female harmonies ... and more self-depreciation." The review cited the album's opening medley with "dark, ominous keyboards ... and a throat-shredding Miller vocal; it's the sound of a band who’d explode if they hadn’t gotten to play those songs at that minute."

According to Scram magazine's Kim Cooper, the live CD showed the band's "rough, antagonistic power" and "their willingness to take Scott's songs in their teeth and shake 'em silly, all of which made the fundamental prettiness of the music seem more touching and fragile," leading up to "a closing salvo that left me breathless and punching the replay button."

AllMusic's Mark Deming wrote, "Given the difficulty of capturing the band's more delicate and layered material onstage, the Loud Family seemed to respond by turning up the amps and hitting harder, and From Ritual to Romance captures a band far more bracingly physical than you might expect." Deming added that the live album "chronicles what made this band difficult for passing observers, as much as what made them so appealing to fans, and this is a gesture to Loud Family fans in the best sense. It's that rare live album that's as dense and demanding as a studio set, and one that also rewards a careful listen."

== Track listing ==
1. "Where the Flood Waters Soak Their Belongings" – 1:52
2. "Here Come the Warm Jets" – 0:42
3. "Spot the Setup" – 2:38
4. "Such Little Nonbelievers" – 3:25
5. "Aerodeliria" – 2:59
6. "Don't Respond, She Can Tell" – 3:54
7. "Sword Swallower" – 4:11
8. "Nine" – 0:49
9. "Not Because You Can" – 3:12
10. "Good, There Are No Lions in the Street" – 4:07
11. "Five" – 1:16
12. "Eleven" – 0:15
13. "Deee-pression" – 3:33
14. "Debaser" – 2:44
15. "Sodium Laureth Sulfate" – 2:50
16. "Baby Hard-To-Be-Around" – 3:11
17. "Go Ahead, You're Dying To" – 2:45
18. "Asleep and Awake on the Man's Freeway" – 2:47
19. "Curse of the Frontier Land" – 3:59
20. "When You Sleep" – 4:21
21. Untitled – 0:55

== Personnel ==
Hotel Utah, San Francisco - October 5, 1996

- Kenny Kessel - bass guitar and vocal
- Scott Miller - guitar and vocal
- Mike Tittel - drums
- Paul Wieneke - keyboards, guitar and vocal

Bottom of the Hill, San Francisco - August 8, 1998

- Kenny Kessel - bass guitar and vocal
- Alison Faith Levy - keyboards and vocal
- Scott Miller - guitar and vocal
- Gil Ray - drums
