= Supercalifragile =

Studio album by Game Theory
- Released: August 24, 2017
- Genres: Power pop, jangle pop
- Length: 58:22
- Label: KCM Records
- Producer: Ken Stringfellow

Game Theory chronology
Distortion of Glory (1993)	Supercalifragile (2017)	Across the Barrier of Sound: PostScript (2020)

Singles from Supercalifragile
- 1. "No Love" Released: August 17, 2017

Supercalifragile is the sixth and final studio album by Game Theory, a California power pop band founded in 1982 by guitarist and singer-songwriter Scott Miller. At the time of his death in 2013, Miller had started work on the recording, which was to be Game Theory's first new album since 1988. Producer Ken Stringfellow and executive producer Kristine Chambers Miller enlisted the participation of numerous past collaborators and friends of Miller to finish the album after Miller's death, using Miller's partially completed recordings and source material. Supercalifragile was released in August 2017.

== Background ==
Scott Miller was the leader and principal songwriter of the 1980s band Game Theory and the 1990s band The Loud Family. He received significant critical acclaim for albums such as Game Theory's Real Nighttime (1985) and Lolita Nation (1987), achieving cult status but little commercial success. Game Theory's catalog went out of print in the 1990s, resulting in several decades of unavailability until a series of reissues by Omnivore Recordings began in 2014.

With the exception of a collaborative album with Anton Barbeau, What If It Works? (2006), Miller took an extended hiatus from his recording career after disbanding the Loud Family in 2000. He stated later in 2006 that he had some unfinished songs for a solo album, but was doubtful that the album would ever materialize. He confirmed, in a 2011 interview, that he had continued to write music despite the absence of prospects for an album, and that "ideas continue to come.... I'll write it down and I put this piece of paper that I've written it down on in a drawer. And I will sort of remember how these things would go together into songs if I ever did have an opportunity to do an album. So it's just in that nascent state, in perpetuity, now."

125 Records, which had released Miller's most recent recording, revealed after Miller's death in April 2013 that he had made plans to reunite in the summer of 2013 with some of his old bandmates to record a new Game Theory album, Supercalifragile, the band's first since Two Steps from the Middle Ages in 1988.

== Production history ==
=== Revival of Miller's project ===
In September 2015, Scott Miller's wife Kristine Chambers announced that she and Ken Stringfellow had teamed to produce a finished recording from the source material for Supercalifragile that Miller had left behind in various stages of completion. A preliminary decision to release the album as a solo project under Scott Miller's name, using the title I Love You All, was later reconsidered in favor of Miller's original plans for a Game Theory project.

On May 5, 2016, it was announced that the project, now under Miller's planned title Supercalifragile as Game Theory's sixth full-length studio album, would be released in 2017. A Kickstarter campaign was created to fund the pressing and other expenses involved with completing the album, and was fully funded within two weeks.

=== Source material ===
According to Stringfellow, Miller's archive included the album's title and a "rough sequence" of songs by title. The source material for the songs included "a handful of studio recordings that could be finished without too much trouble, [and] some acoustic demos that it would be possible to track instruments along to and make them album quality".

In addition to complete songs and demos, the source material included "almost 300 song fragments and about 50 lyric fragments", including a few "sketches" recorded on Miller's phone just two days before his death:

Imagine someone dumping the contents of several jigsaw puzzles into one box, and you have to sort out what goes with which puzzle, then assemble each one, which may or may not have enough pieces to complete it. ... Most of the fragments were a line or two, never more than 30 seconds long and usually about 10 seconds. Some were voice and guitar, some were just melodies Scott hummed into the phone or dictaphone while walking, driving or taking a bath.

== Songwriting collaborations ==
Stéphane Schück, an artist in France, had previously corresponded and collaborated with Miller on four songs that appear on Supercalifragile. For three of their co-written songs, Miller wrote lyrics and recorded lead vocals. A fourth, "I Still Dream of Getting Back to Paris", includes lyrics and lead vocals by Anton Barbeau, along with passages spoken by Miller in French.

Aimee Mann also began her collaboration with Miller before his death. In July 2015, before the project was formally announced, Mann wrote, "I'm working on this song I wrote with Scott Miller, and hearing him sing it in my headphones is possibly the most devastatingly heartbreaking thing I've ever experienced." Mann's announcement was accompanied by a photo of sheet music bearing the song's title, "No Love."

Another eight of the album's 15 songs were developed and composed as posthumous collaborations between Miller and other songwriters, based on Miller's song and lyric fragments. After Stringfellow completed the "massive undertaking" of determining "which fragments were similar and went with which proposed title", and separating them from unclassifiable fragments that would remain undeveloped, he assigned one song each to a list of Miller's "known or requested collaborators", and assigned two to himself.

The artists assigned to complete Miller's songs based only on fragmentary material were Jon Auer of the Posies, Doug Gillard, Ted Leo, Alison Faith Levy, Will Sheff, and Stringfellow, each of whom delivered a finished recording and was credited as a co-writer with Miller. Game Theory's former producer Mitch Easter, without a co-writing credit, contributed guitar, drums, synth, and mixing to complete Miller's song "Laurel Canyon".

== Personnel ==
In the summer of 2015, recording took place at Abbey Road Studios in London for the song "I Still Dream of Getting Back to Paris", co-written by Miller, Schück, and Barbeau. The sessions included Schück, Barbeau, Stringfellow, and past Game Theory member Jozef Becker.

Game Theory members Nan Becker, Dave Gill, Gil Ray, and Suzi Ziegler participated in recording sessions in late May and early June 2016, held at Sharkbite Studio in Oakland, California. Additional members of Game Theory who appeared on the album included Donnette Thayer, Fred Juhos, Shelley LaFreniere, and The Loud Family's Alison Faith Levy.

In addition to performances by the artists credited as co-writers, other contributing performers included Peter Buck of R.E.M., Nina Gordon, and Scott Kannberg. The final credits also included performers whose participation had not previously been announced, such as Matt LeMay, John Moremen, and Jonathan Segel.

== Reception ==
Professional ratings
Review scores
Source	Rating
GIGsoup	91/100

Fluxblog's Matthew Perpetua pointed to the album title's play on the Mary Poppins song "Supercalifragilisticexpialidocious" as "a perfect example of Scott Miller's wit as a lyricist – a mawkish bit of Disney nostalgia broken in half to reveal a vulnerability that was always right there in front of us."

According to Stomp and Stammer's Glen Sarvady, "the most memorable tracks tend to be ones Miller came closest to seeing through." Sarvady cited "All You Need Is White" for delivering "precisely the type of frantic pop charge Miller liked to use as a kickoff", and characterized "An Overview of Item Response Theory" as the last of Miller's "masterworks" of "anthemic power pop... indulging his love of math/science geekery."

Blurt called the album an "eagerly-awaited... labor of love", identifying its highlights as "No Love," "Time Warner," "All You Need Is White," and "I Still Dream of Getting Back to Paris".

GIGsoup reviewer Ian Rushbury described the album as "a quiet triumph for all concerned... better than even the most die-hard fan could have hoped for", writing that it "sits perfectly in Miller’s enviable catalogue" as "a fitting epitaph to a body of work like none other."

== Releases ==
In January 2017, a music video of "I Still Dream of Getting Back to Paris" was released on YouTube. Directed by Hector Di Napoli and shot during recording sessions at Abbey Road Studios, the release previewed the final album version with a rough preliminary mix of the audio.

A limited first pressing of the album on vinyl and CD, as well as digital download, was released to Kickstarter backers in early August 2017.

The album's public release took place via Bandcamp on August 24, 2017. The song "No Love", co-written by Scott Miller and Aimee Mann, was digitally released on Tidal one week earlier.

== Track listing ==
All tracks are written by Scott Miller, except as noted.

No.	Title	Writer(s)	Length
1.	"The End Precedes the Beginning"		2:03
2.	"All You Need Is White"	Scott Miller; Stéphane Schück	3:56
3.	"Time Warner"		3:18
4.	"An Overview of Item Response Theory"	Miller; Schück	4:18
5.	"No Love"	Miller; Aimee Mann	3:26
6.	"Valerie Tomorrow"	Miller; Ken Stringfellow	2:59
7.	"Say Goodbye"	Miller; Doug Gillard	4:02
8.	"Laurel Canyon"		5:18
9.	"Kristine"	Miller; Will Sheff; Matt LeMay	4:14
10.	"Between the Bottles"	Miller; Jon Auer	3:58
11.	"Always Julianne"	Miller; Stringfellow	3:44
12.	"It's a Wonderful Lie"	Miller; Alison Faith Levy	4:44
13.	"Oh, Death"	Miller; Ted Leo	2:58
14.	"Exit for an Opening"	Miller; Schück	4:57
15.	"I Still Dream of Getting Back to Paris"	Miller; Schück; Anton Barbeau	4:27
