= Interbabe Concern =

Studio album by the Loud Family
- Released: July 1996
- Recorded: 1996
- Genre: Rock, power pop
- Length: 57:34
- Label: Alias
- Producer: Scott Miller

The Loud Family chronology
The Tape of Only Linda (1994)	Interbabe Concern (1996)	Days for Days (1998)

Professional ratings
Review scores
Source	Rating
AllMusic	3/5 stars

Interbabe Concern is the Loud Family's third full-length album, and their first to be produced by Scott Miller instead of Mitch Easter. With the exception of keyboard player Paul Wieneke and Miller, this was a new line-up of the band.

== Personnel ==
After touring in support of the 1994 album The Tape of Only Linda, three members – bass player Rob Poor, guitarist Zachary Smith, and drummer Jozef Becker – left the group for family or career reasons.

For Interbabe Concern, Scott Miller took over the lead guitar duties that he had ceded to Smith on prior Loud Family albums. Paul Wieneke remained on keyboards and occasional lead vocals, and Kenny Kessel and Dawn Richardson joined the group on bass and drums, respectively. Becker remained as drummer long enough to record several tracks on the album.

As credited in the CD booklet, the members were:

- Kenny Kessel - bass guitar and backing vocals
- Scott Miller - most guitars and vocals
- Dawn Richardson - most drums and all vibra-slap
- Paul Wieneke - synthesizer, unearthly rackets (beginning of "Sodium", "Chokehold", etc.), guitar, backing vocals, lead vocals on "Uncle Lucky"

Guest musicians included Ken Stringfellow of The Posies on guitar, and Nina Gordon of Veruca Salt. Gordon provided backing vocals on the co-written song "The Softest Tip Of Her Baby Tongue". Stringfellow is credited for co-writing "Sodium Laureth Sulfate" and "I No Longer Fear the Headless," and also played on "Not Expecting Both Contempo And Classique."

Former Game Theory drummer Gil Ray and keyboard player Shelley LaFreniere also appeared as guests; Ray would join the Loud Family as a member for their next album, Days for Days. Richardson left the band in 1996, and was replaced on the concert tour by drummer Mike Tittel, who would later lead the Ohio-based band New Sincerity Works.

== Thematic notes ==
According to Miller, the title Interbabe Concern was inspired by a realization while watching an episode of Baywatch "that the show's formula sandwiched a 'serious' matter – the 'concern' – between stretches of bathing suit-wearing cheesecake lifeguard babes." Reviewers, however, theorized that the title "must have had more than a little to do with his personal circumstances. While he was making the album, he told a fan that he was going through a brutal divorce but was getting the best music of his career out of it."

According to the Los Angeles Times, the "prevailing mood of frustration and loss" in Interbabe Concern sprang from the "collapse of Miller's marriage to Shalini Chatterjee." Critic William Ham, writing in the 2005 book Lost in the Grooves, called this a "harsh, difficult album" with "dizzying mood-swings," drawn from a dark period in Miller's life. Ham noted the twin departures of Miller's wife and his longtime producer Mitch Easter, and inferred that "since Chatterjee is [in 2005] married to Easter, we can assume that the two events were not mutually exclusive."

The result, according to Ham, was a "jagged sonic mosaic" adeptly fashioned by Miller from the "shattered pieces." The Tulsa World's Thomas Conner identified it as "sort of a concept album... an overanalysis of a divorce," quoting Miller's liner notes to add, "recorded in cold, passionless digital."

== Critical response ==
Revisiting the album in 2004, Adam Sobsey wrote:

Like all Miller's music, Interbabe Concern is driven by the alchemy between his irrepressible instincts for unconventionality and his steeping in traditional pop songcraft. He was an adept of T.S. Eliot and James Joyce, and his work is firmly anchored in the modernist tradition, both its exploratory sensibility and its ultimate priority on beauty and feeling — melody, harmony and, above all, pleasure. Interbabe Concern is Miller's most complete album and his most challenging. It is sprawling yet involuted, jagged but organically whole, dense but angular, agitated yet finally resigned, diffident and bitter yet richly and carefully expressive. "Everything on this album is on purpose," Miller's italicized liner note boasts, or warns, or confesses.

In a 1996 review, Glenn McDonald posited that "the Loud Family's third album, Interbabe Concern, is the greatest music this twelve months of humanity was able to devise," labeling it Miller's "most uncompromising and inaccessible record" with "too much going on, on too many levels, to grasp it at full speed." Sobsey later wrote, "More than any of [Miller's] other albums, it is the one that most assuredly demonstrates why he is still considered by peers and by his small but impassioned fan base one of the very greatest and most difficult geniuses of pop music."

Mark Deming, in the 2002 book All Music Guide to Rock: The Definitive Guide to Rock, Pop, and Soul, wrote, "It's an inarguably interesting album, but one that demands a lot more work for the listener to ferret out the good stuff." Other reviewers found the album difficult, but also emphasized the reward: "Miller cycles through incongruous guitar chords with the same bravery and success of Steely Dan, and he packs each song with one syllable for nearly every note. Some of these songs might play well with the top down, but those who like to listen too closely to their pop music will get more out of the Loud Family."

Deming wrote that Interbabe Concern features "the fragmented songs and purposefully twisted aural montage" that were missing from the group's prior album, The Tape of Only Linda. Deming noted:

[W]ithout producer Mitch Easter on hand, Miller seems to have used Interbabe Concern as an opportunity to reacquaint himself with the cryptic side of his musical personality; there are a lot more short pseudo-tunes interspersed between the "real" songs, plenty of odd found noises and sound effects, and while Miller plays plenty of guitar here, there's a decidedly lower hard-and-heavy quotient than on the muscular The Tape of Only Linda. Interbabe Concern plays like a somewhat stranger version of Loud Family's debut, Plants and Birds and Rocks and Things ... the production has a lot less gloss, and Miller's fondness for chaos seems to outweigh his knack for perfect pop hooks.

According to Conner, "Miller arranges his songs like roller coasters; you always know where you're going to end up, but the time signatures and key changes throw you around on the way there." Conner cited the song "Don't Respond, She Can Tell" as a "real kick with what sounds like a BB dropping on a table keeping time."

CMJ New Music Monthly's review categorized the music as "pop of the most depraved variety," and wrote, "There’s always some jarring detail added or subtracted, some unsettling minor component that takes these tunes out of the realm of the normal. Gently plucked acoustic guitars will suddenly be ripped apart by a mutinous fuzzbox, seemingly at random." The review continued, "If pop’s purpose is to soothe and delight, then this is either half-pop or fullblooded mutation/mutilation, as there’s nothing soothing about this in the least. It’s disturbing, but the sort of disturbance you’ll be whistling at work.

== Track listing ==
1. "Sodium Laureth Sulfate" – 3:19
2. "North San Bruno Dishonor Trip" – 0:45
3. "Don't Respond, She Can Tell" – 3:59
4. "I'm Not Really a Spring" – 3:41
5. "Rise of the Chokehold Princess" – 4:20
6. "Such Little Nonbelievers" – 3:37
7. "The Softest Tip of Her Baby Tongue" – 3:30
8. "Screwed Over by Stylish Introverts" – 2:41
9. "Top-Dollar Survivalist Hardware" – 3:29
10. "Not Expecting Both Contempo and Classique" – 3:31
11. "I No Longer Fear the Headless" – 4:52
12. "Hot Rox Avec Lying Sweet-Talk" – 1:07
13. "Uncle Lucky" – 3:53
14. "Just Gone" – 2:47
15. "Asleep and Awake on the Man's Freeway" – 2:39
16. "Where They Go Back to School but Get Depressed" – 2:48
17. "Where They Sell Antique Food" – 0:38
18. "Where the Flood Waters Soak Their Belongings" – 1:08
19. "Where They Walk Over Sainte Therese" – 4:40
