= What If It Works? =

Studio album by The Loud Family and Anton Barbeau
- Released: July 11, 2006
- Recorded: 2006
- Genre: Rock, power pop
- Length: 43:37
- Label: 125 Records
- Producer: Scott Miller and Anton Barbeau

The Loud Family and Anton Barbeau chronology
From Ritual to Romance (2002)	What If It Works? (2006)

Professional ratings
Review scores
Source	Rating
Allmusic	3.5/5 stars

What If It Works? is the Loud Family's seventh full-length album, a studio collaboration with Sacramento-based pop musician Anton Barbeau released in 2006. A March 2022 reissue of the album, with eleven bonus tracks, was announced by Omnivore Recordings.

== Production history ==
Scott Miller was persuaded by 125 Records to record the album, which was his final work to be released before his death in 2013. Miller had considered releasing it under his own name with Barbeau; however, at the label's request, the album was credited to "The Loud Family and Anton Barbeau," to avoid confusion between Miller and a similarly named country musician.

According to CV Weekly, "Anton Barbeau first crossed paths with Scott during the Game Theory years. At his third Game Theory show, he managed to slip a cassette of his own music to the drummer, who passed it on to Scott. They struck up a lasting friendship when Scott called to praise Anton’s music.... His collaboration with Scott came about rather organically when the pair played together at Sacramento’s True Love Coffeehouse."

Miller and Barbeau divided the songwriting chores evenly on the record, each contributing four original songs, with one co-written song. The album also includes covers of "Rocks Off" by The Rolling Stones, "I Think I See the Light" by Cat Stevens, and "Remember You" by The Zombies.

Previous members of the Loud Family returned for the album, with drummer Jozef Becker and bass player Kenny Kessel playing on most of the tracks, and drummer Gil Ray and keyboard player Alison Faith Levy making a single appearance.

=== 2022 reissue ===
Omnivore Recordings, which reissued Miller's recordings with the band Game Theory, announced a March 2022 reissue of What If It Works?, featuring eleven bonus tracks, of which ten were previously unissued. The packaging of the reissue features photos, a conversation between Barbeau and Scott's widow Kristine Miller about the making of the record, and a new essay by musician and Tony-winning playwright Stew.

== Critical reception ==
The Sacramento Bee called the album "a mixture of sweet pop and jangly rock," as if "the Beatles were covered by the Replacements."

A review by Jen Grover found the Miller/Barbeau pairing to be "stylistically different yet strangely complementary," pointing to a contrast in "I Think I See the Light" between Miller's "deliciously sexy" vocals and Barbeau's comparatively "grating and nasal" vocals which nonetheless lent "gritty honesty to the arrangement." Miller's "Don't Bother Me While I'm Living Forever," his last to be written for the album, was described as "achingly pretty and dreamingly swirly... its echoey, interlacing guitar and melancholy melody taking it into shoegaze territory."

USA Today described What If It Works? as a "terrific album... by one of underground pop-rock's best-kept secrets, the Loud Family."

== Track listing ==
No.	Title	Writer(s)	Length
1.	"Rocks Off"	Jagger/Richards	3:58
2.	"Song About "Rocks Off""	Miller	3:11
3.	"Pop Song 99"	Barbeau	3:03
4.	"Total Mass Destruction"	Miller	4:13
5.	"Flow Thee Water"	Barbeau	2:48
6.	"Remember You"	Chris White	2:26
7.	"(Kind of) In Love"	Miller/Barbeau	2:49
8.	"Mavis of Maybelline Towers"	Miller	3:17
9.	"I Think I See the Light"	Cat Stevens	4:12
10.	"What If It Works?"	Barbeau	3:36

2006 CD bonus tracks
No.	Title	Writer(s)	Length
11.	"Don't Bother Me While I'm Living Forever"	Miller	5:57
12.	"I've Been Craving Lately"	Barbeau	3:59

2022 CD bonus tracks
No.	Title	Writer(s)	Length
13.	"Third Eye" (Scott's Vocal)
14.	"Little Daisy" (Scott's Mix)	Barbeau
15.	"(Kind of) In Love" (Scott's Sketch Demo)	Miller/Barbeau
16.	"(Kind of) In Love" (Anton's Demo)	Miller/Barbeau
17.	"Song About "Rocks Off"" (Demo)	Miller
18.	"I Wanna Make You Come Just by Looking at Your Eye" (Demo)
19.	"Rise of the Chokehold Princess" (at Anton's)	Scott Miller/Paul Weineke
20.	"Pop Song 99" (Demo)	Barbeau
21.	"Don't Bother Me While I'm Living Forever" (Demo)	Miller
22.	"What If It Works?" (Demo)	Barbeau
23.	"Just Gone" (at Anton's)	Miller

== Personnel ==
- Scott Miller – vocals, guitar, some keyboards, organ, piano, bass guitar, Waldorf MicroWave
- Anton Barbeau – vocals, Hammond organ, Wurlitzer, farfisa, some drums, acoustic piano, Microkorg, bass guitar, Micromoog, tambourine, shaker, Korg MS-10/Roland Space Echo, Arp Odyssey, acoustic and anti-acoustic piano, Navation X-Station
- Kenny Kessel – bass guitar
- Jozef Becker – drums
- Kristine Chambers – backing vocals on "Total Mass Destruction"
- Steve Randall – electric guitar on "Flow Thee Water"
- Dave Middleton – electric guitar on "Flow Thee Water"
- Julie Meyes – farfisa on "Flow Thee Water"
- Alison Faith Levy – piano and backing vocals on "I Think I See The Light"
- Gil Ray – percussion on "I Think I See The Light"
- Larry Tagg – bass guitar on "Don't Bother Me While I'm Living Forever" and "I've Been Craving Lately"
