= Attractive Nuisance =

Studio album by the Loud Family
- Released: February 22, 2000
- Recorded: 1999
- Genre: Rock, power pop
- Length: 50:09
- Label: Alias
- Producer: Scott Miller

The Loud Family chronology
Days for Days (1998)	Attractive Nuisance (2000)	From Ritual to Romance (2002)

Attractive Nuisance, released in 2000, is the Loud Family's fifth full-length album. It has the same line-up as the 1998 album, Days for Days. At the time of its release, it was announced as the final Loud Family album.

== Critical reception ==
Professional ratings
Review scores
Source	Rating
AllMusic	4/5 stars
PopMatters	8/10

PopMatters called the album "orchestral in [its] tapestry of sounds," with a variety of styles ranging "from catchy up-tempo pop, to blistering psychedelic rock, to piano balladry."

The Chicago Tribune pointed out contrasting styles in specific songs: "the lush orchestral contours of 'One Will Be the Highway,' the nearly avant-garde interludes of 'Save Your Money' or the acid-metal roar of "Nice When I Want Something.'" The review by Greg Kot also cited Scott Miller's "supple melodies" and "dense, often opaque lyrics", calling him a "quirky visionary [who] still delights in the possibilities of the three-minute pop song."

AllMusic's Mark Deming wrote that the album's "alternately bracing and pensive melodies, angular guitar figures, and superb keyboard textures harked back to the best work of Miller's previous band, Game Theory," and called the result "a wickedly arch slice of intelligent power pop" with "smart, energetic hooks, and emotionally compelling melodies".

Tinnitist reviewer Daryl Sterdan referred to Miller's "offkilter sense of musical mischief... matched only by his keen ability to fashion a sharp hook from the most unlikely of ingredients," and cited the songs "720 Times Happier Than the Unjust Man" and "No One's Watching My Limo Ride" for their "sparkle and shine," "'70s power-pop crunch," and "English-lit grad-student smarts."

== Track listing ==
All songs written by Loud Family

No.	Title	Length
1.	"720 Times Happier Than the Unjust Man"	3:46
2.	"One Will be the Highway"	3:42
3.	"Save Your Money"	4:06
4.	"Nice When I Want Something"	5:32
5.	"Years of Wrong Impressions"	3:19
6.	"Blackness, Blackness"	4:46
7.	"Backward Century"	4:11
8.	"Soul D.C."	5:12
9.	"The Apprentice"	3:06
10.	"No One's Watching My Limo Ride"	3:06
11.	"Controlled Burn" (Parts 1 and 2)	4:57
12.	"Motion of Ariel"	4:26

== Personnel ==
From the CD sleeve:

- Scott Miller - lead vocals on all songs except 5 and 9, guitar, some of synthesizer on 1 and 11, backing vocals on 9
- Kenny Kessel - bass guitar, backing vocals on 3, 4, 5, 6, 7, 8, 9, 10, 12
- Alison Faith Levy - lead vocals on 5 and 9, piano, synthesizer and sampled instruments, backing vocals on 1, 2, 3, 4, 6, 7, 8, 12
- Gil Ray - drums, percussion, guitar on 11, some of synthesizer on 11
- Mike Keneally - guitar solo on 4
