= Days for Days =

Studio album by the Loud Family
- Released: May 19, 1998
- Recorded: 1998
- Genre: Rock, power pop
- Length: 50:14
- Label: Alias
- Producer: Scott Miller

The Loud Family chronology
Interbabe Concern (1996)	Days for Days (1998)	Attractive Nuisance (2000)

Days for Days is an album by the Loud Family, released in 1998. The band's leader, Scott Miller, and the bass guitar player, Kenny Kessel, are the only members of the band remaining from the previous album. Gil Ray, who had been a member of Miller's 1980s band Game Theory, joined Miller for the album.

Odd-numbered tracks on this album are soundscapes without names, while even-numbered tracks are named songs. While the odd-numbered tracks had no listed titles on this release, subsequent live recordings of the songs (as on From Ritual to Romance) titled these tracks by number - so track 1 was "One", track 3 "Three", etc.

== Critical reception ==
Professional ratings
Review scores
Source	Rating
AllMusic	3/5 stars

Trouser Press wrote that "the band does rock more convincingly than before, with stomping guitars in 'Deee-Pression' and the dizzying opening melody of 'Crypto-Sicko' (a bit Big Star, a bit Talking Heads)."

== Track listing ==
All tracks by The Loud Family

1. Untitled – 1:04
2. "Cortex the Killer" – 5:00
3. Untitled – 1:01
4. "Good, There Are No Lions in the Street" – 4:17
5. Untitled – 1:20
6. "Deee-Pression" – 3:37
7. Untitled – :52
8. "Way Too Helpful" – 4:47
9. Untitled – 1:16
10. "Mozart Sonatas" – 2:01
11. Untitled – :15
12. "Businessmen Are Okay" – 4:42
13. Untitled – :47
14. "Crypto-Sicko" – 3:24
15. Untitled – 1:02
16. "Why We Don't Live in Mauritania" – 4:52
17. Untitled – 1:23
18. "Sister Sleep" – 8:25

== Personnel ==
From the CD sleeve:

- Kenny Kessel - bass guitar and vocals
- Alison Faith Levy - I Can't Believe It's Not Flute and Gee Your Cello Smells Acoustic
- Scott Miller - guitars and vocals
- Gil Ray - drums, tambourine and maracas

with

- Jonathan Segel - bouzouki, slide guitar and violin on "Sister Sleep" and "Mauritania"
