= Gil Ray =

American drummer

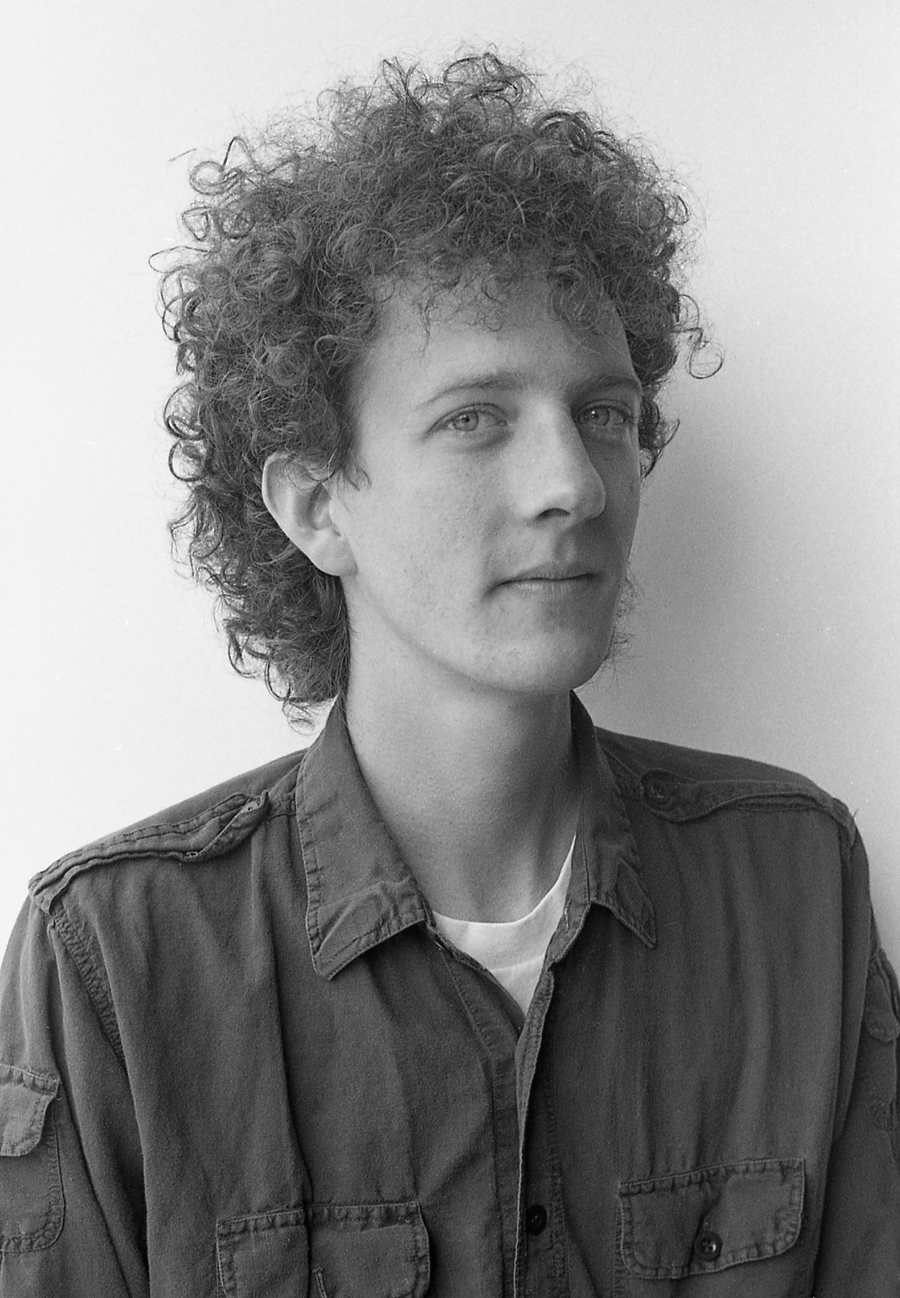
- Gil Ray in 1985

Background information
- Born: George Gilbert Ray; September 17, 1956
- Died: January 24, 2017 (aged 60)
- Genres: Power pop, alternative rock
- Occupation: Drummer
- Instrument(s): Drums, guitar, vocals
- Years active: 1970s–2016
- Labels: 125 Records

George Gilbert Ray (September 17, 1956 – January 24, 2017) was an American rock drummer, guitarist, and vocalist, best known for his recordings in the 1980s and 1990s as a member of the bands Game Theory and The Loud Family. In late 2012, he joined Rain Parade as drummer for a series of reunion performances.

== Biography ==
=== Early musical career ===
Gil Ray grew up in Charlotte, North Carolina, and formed his first band as a child in 1966.

By the mid-1970s, Ray began playing in several local Charlotte bands with a variety of styles that included glam rock, prog rock, jazz, disco, and punk/new wave. In 1979, he recorded a 12-inch single with a band called The Happy Eggs, followed by their 1981 four-song EP Wake Up, which was reissued on vinyl by DBK Works in July 2014.

Ray moved to San Francisco in 1982, where he played in several bands including goth rockers Fade To Black.

=== Game Theory ===
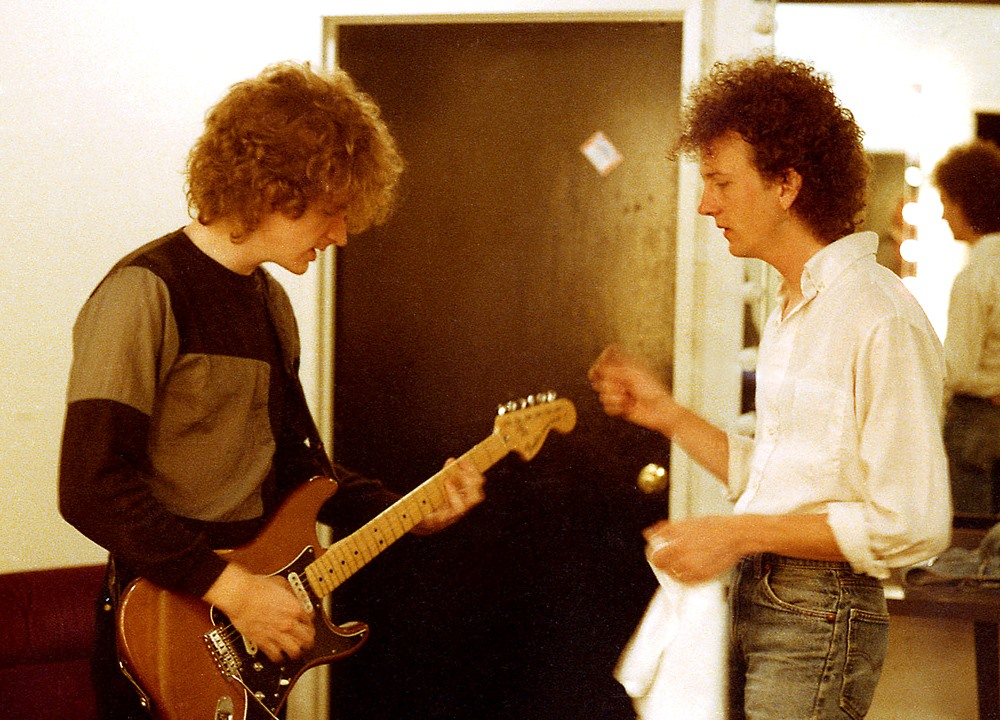
Miller and Ray, prior to first show of new Game Theory line-up, 1985.

In 1985, Gil Ray joined the band Game Theory, led by Scott Miller. As drummer and backing vocalist for Game Theory, Ray recorded three studio albums produced by Mitch Easter.

The 1986 album The Big Shot Chronicles was recorded in September 1985 in Winston-Salem, during the middle of the band's tour supporting an album by the band's previous line-up. Spin's review of The Big Shot Chronicles called it "a rare commodity... a pop record that can actually make you laugh and cry and squirm all at once." The Big Shot Chronicles was described as "harsh, dense, and metallic-sounding," and "damned ambitious as pop fare goes nowadays," citing the "difficult time signatures" and "criss-cross rhythms" as distinctive.

In addition to Ray's contributions to Game Theory's 1987 cult classic Lolita Nation as a performer, Ray was credited as songwriter for the instrumental track "Where They Have To Let You In." In a review of the double album, Spin cited Lolita Nation as "some of the gutsiest, most distinctive rock 'n' roll heard in 1987," with "sumptuous melodic hooks ... played with startling intensity and precision," while simultaneously noting that the band "elected to shinny way out on an aesthetic limb" with "a thoroughly perplexing conglomeration of brief instrumental shards and stabs". The CD version of Lolita Nation, long out of print, has since become a collector's item.

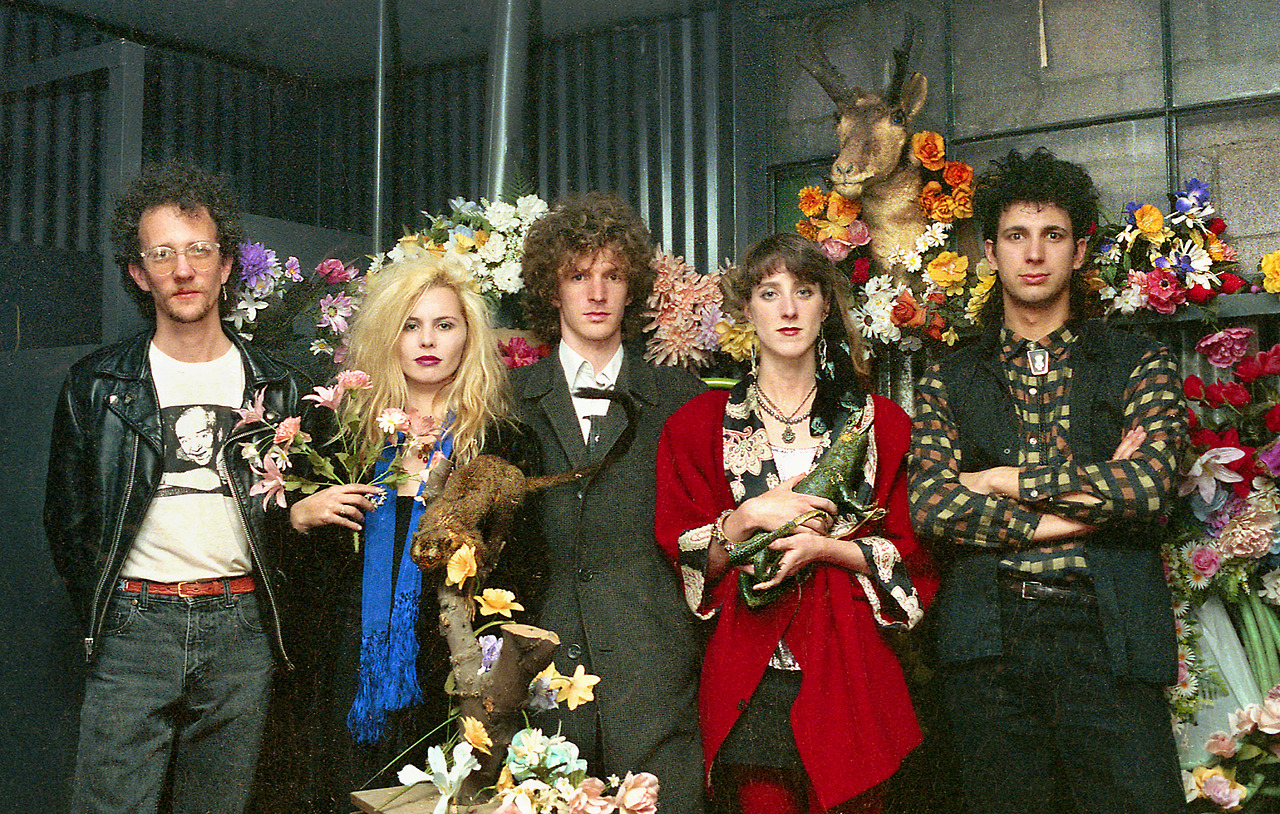
Game Theory in Arizona, 1988, during Two Steps from the Middle Ages tour. L-R: Ray, Thayer, Miller, LaFreniere, Gassuan.

The group's 1988 release, Two Steps from the Middle Ages, took a less experimental approach, but despite numerous positive reviews and airplay on college radio, the album failed to reach a mainstream audience. Spin called the album "essential California rock 'n' roll for the 80s – tense, bristling energy, ingenious hooks and haunting melodies that ought to spell commercial potential. But the albums have remained stuck in the cultist-critic-college DJ loop."

Soon after the release of Two Steps and Game Theory's 1988 tour, rhythm guitarist Donnette Thayer left the group to form Hex with Steve Kilbey of The Church. Keyboard player Shelley LaFreniere and bassist Guillaume Gassuan departed at that time as well, leaving Ray as the only band member to remain with Scott Miller.

As a result of a back injury in 1989 that would put Ray's drumming career on hold for nearly a decade, Ray shifted to playing guitar and keyboards during Game Theory's performances in late 1989 and early 1990. Jozef Becker replaced Ray as drummer, and Michael Quercio (previously of The Three O'Clock) joined as bassist and backing vocalist. In late 1989, the line-up of Miller, Ray, Becker, and Quercio recorded a four-song demo in San Francisco that included "Inverness" and "Idiot Son," both later to be recorded by The Loud Family. The London-based tabloid Bucketfull of Brains wrote, "One listen to this latest demo... and you can't help but wonder if pop music can get any better than this."

Prior to Game Theory's 1989 "mini-tour" of the Northwestern United States, Ray was a victim of random street violence in San Francisco, resulting in a serious eye injury. Ray ultimately left the group in 1990, and Miller subsequently regrouped with Becker to form The Loud Family in 1991.

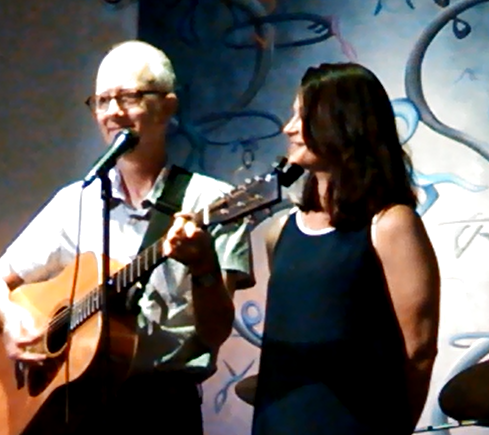
Gil Ray and Suzi Ziegler performing in July 2013 at Scott Miller memorial tribute.

Game Theory briefly reunited in July 2013 for a tribute performance in Sacramento as a memorial to Scott Miller, in which Ray performed on guitar and vocals.

In late May and early June 2016, Ray went into the studio with Nan Becker, Dave Gill, and Suzi Ziegler to record percussion for the Game Theory album Supercalifragile (2017). The producers, Ken Stringfellow and Miller's wife Kristine Chambers, undertook a collaborative effort using Miller's recordings and source materials to complete the album he had been planning at the time of his death.

=== The Loud Family ===
Ray's drumming career resumed in 1998, when he teamed again with Scott Miller, joining as a member of Miller's 1990s band, The Loud Family. Ray played on the Loud Family's last two studio albums, Days for Days (1998) and Attractive Nuisance (2000).

Live performances by Ray were included on the Loud Family album From Ritual to Romance, released in 2002. Ray was also featured in the concert documentary video Loud Family Live 2000, directed by Danny Plotnick, which was released on DVD in 2003.

In 2006, Ray appeared on the Loud Family's final album, What If It Works? (credited to the Loud Family and Anton Barbeau), providing percussion on their cover of the Cat Stevens song "I Think I See the Light."

=== Side projects and solo release ===
After the dissolution of Game Theory, Ray formed a trio called Shiny Wet Parts with Shelley LaFreniere and Robert Toren. The group released two albums, Riding The Big Brown Horse With No Legs (1991) and Telejism (1992), as limited-distribution cassette recordings.

In 1999, Ray joined The Snugglers, a "local supergroup," to write and perform the soundtrack of Swingers' Serenade, a short film by Danny Plotnick. The band also included Alison Faith Levy, Miles Montalbano, John Moremen, and Jon Birdsong. He later appeared on Levy's 2000 solo album My World View.

I Am Atomic Man!, Gil Ray's first solo album, was released on 125 Records in 2006. Critic Jeff Giles called it "a loving throwback to the lo-fi, homebrewed indie rock of 20 years ago."

=== Rain Parade and other reunions ===
In September 2011, Ray returned to performing live on drums after eleven years, participating in a reunion of his early 1980s band Fade To Black as part of San Francisco's Deathstock music festival.

Later that year, Ray rejoined Scott Miller, backed up by The Bye Bye Blackbirds, as drummer for a December 4 performance at the Starry Plough in Berkeley.

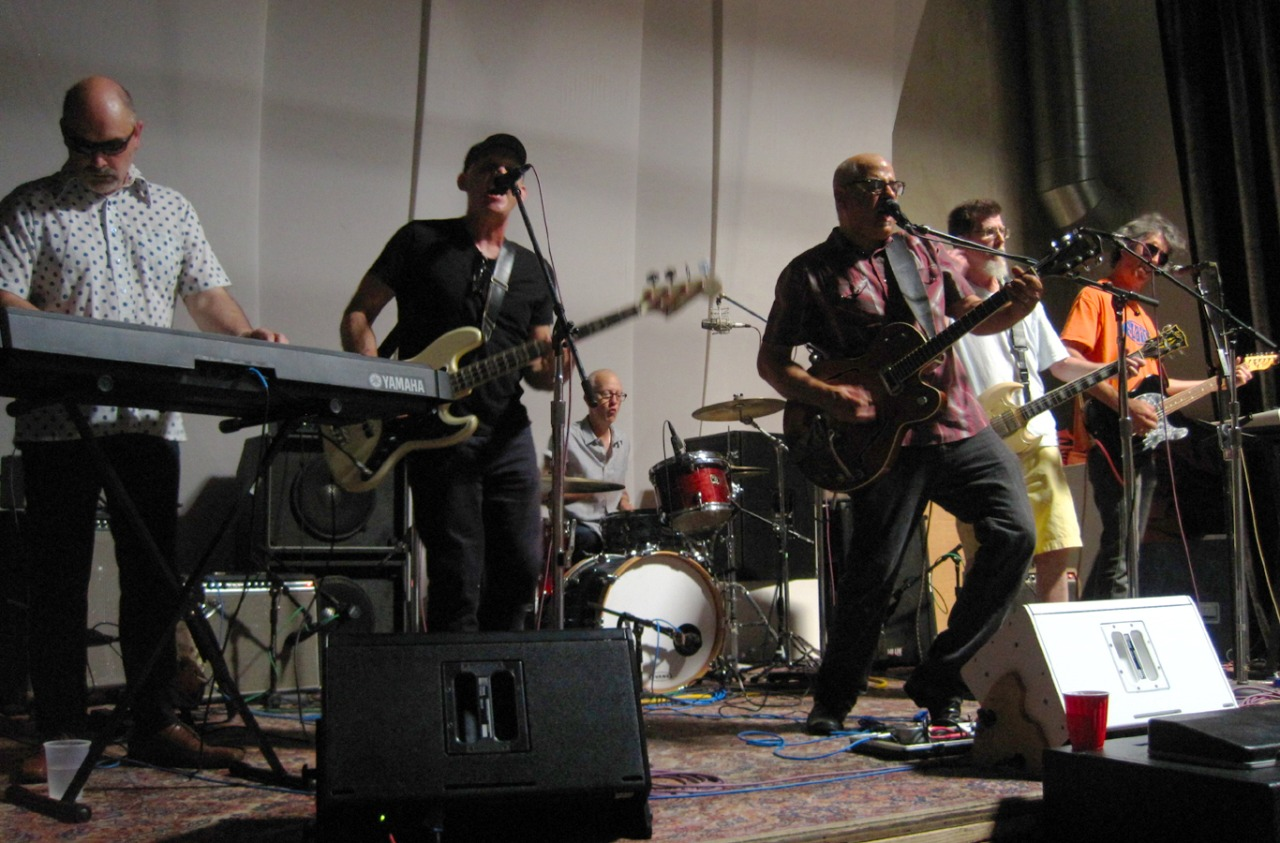
Gil Ray on drums with Rain Parade in September 2013

In 2012, Gil Ray joined Rain Parade, a band that was originally active in the Paisley Underground scene in Los Angeles in the 1980s. The reunited Rain Parade line-up also included original members Matt Piucci, Steven Roback, and John Thoman, augmented by Mark Hanley and Alec Palao. According to Piucci, Ray had been suggested by Tim Lee and Dan Vallor, quickly ending the group's search for a new drummer: "Then we met Gil Ray and that settled it. Gil has been wonderful.... Call it fate, karma, divine intervention, who knows, but that guy is perfect for this band. He is a true Southern gentleman."

The band, including Ray on drums, performed their comeback concert on December 20, 2012, at Cafe Du Nord in San Francisco. The performance was later released on 090 Records as Rain Parade's live concert CD San Francisco 2012.

Ray continued touring with Rain Parade in 2013 and 2014, including two shows in December 2013 with three other reunited Paisley Underground bands – The Bangles, The Dream Syndicate, and The Three O'Clock – at The Fillmore in San Francisco and The Fonda Theatre in Los Angeles.

Recording sessions in 2016 for Supercalifragile, the final Game Theory album, included Ray on percussion. The album was released in a limited first pressing in August 2017.

=== Illness and death ===
Ray suffered from cancer for several years. He documented his struggle on his blog. His death, on January 24, 2017, at the age of 60, was announced on the Loud Family's website.

== Critical response and influence ==
The Washington Post, reviewing a Loud Family concert in April 2000, wrote that "drummer Gil Ray's inventiveness was a revelation." Mark Deming, writing in the 2002 book All Music Guide to Rock: The Definitive Guide to Rock, Pop, and Soul, praised Ray's "sure but subtle touch," noting that Ray and bassist Kenny Kessel were "a subtle, solid, and inventive rhythm section" for the final Loud Family albums.

In 2013, drummer Todd Phillips of The Juliana Hatfield Three cited Ray's influence on his work, telling Spin that in 1993, "I was listening to this record Lolita Nation by Game Theory all the time. I was obsessed with a song called 'We Love You, Carol and Alison,' because the drummer, Gil Ray, played the verses with his toms instead of the hi-hats." Phillips said that he copied Ray's technique for the drum intro to "My Sister," a song that became the breakout single for Juliana Hatfield's group.

== Discography ==
=== With Game Theory ===
- The Big Shot Chronicles (Enigma, 1986)
- Lolita Nation (Enigma, 1987)
- Two Steps from the Middle Ages (Enigma, 1988)
- Tinker to Evers to Chance (Alias, 1990)
- Supercalifragile (2017)

=== With The Loud Family ===
- Days for Days (Alias, 1998)
- Attractive Nuisance (Alias, 1990)
- From Ritual to Romance (live) (125 Records, 2002)
- What If It Works? (125 Records, 2006)

=== With Rain Parade ===
- San Francisco 2012 (live) (090 Records, 2013)

=== Other ===
==== Solo ====
- I Am Atomic Man! (125 Records, 2006)

==== With The Happy Eggs ====
- "You Can't Avoid Love" b/w "Blue Skies" (12-inch single) (Ovo Records, 1979)
- Wake Up (7-inch EP) (Ovo Records, 1981; reissued on DBK Works, 2014)

==== With Fade to Black ====
- Corridors of Gender (12-inch EP) (CD Presents Ltd., 1984)
- SF Revisited (1982-1985) (CD compilation) (Sound Cultivator, 2008
- Corridors Revisited (CDr compilation) (Tenderloin, 2011)

==== With Shiny Wet Parts ====
- Riding The Big Brown Horse With No Legs (1991, cassette)
- Telejism (1992, cassette)

== Videography ==
- Loud Family Live 2000 (DVD) (125 Records, 2003)
