= The Loud Family =

American power pop band

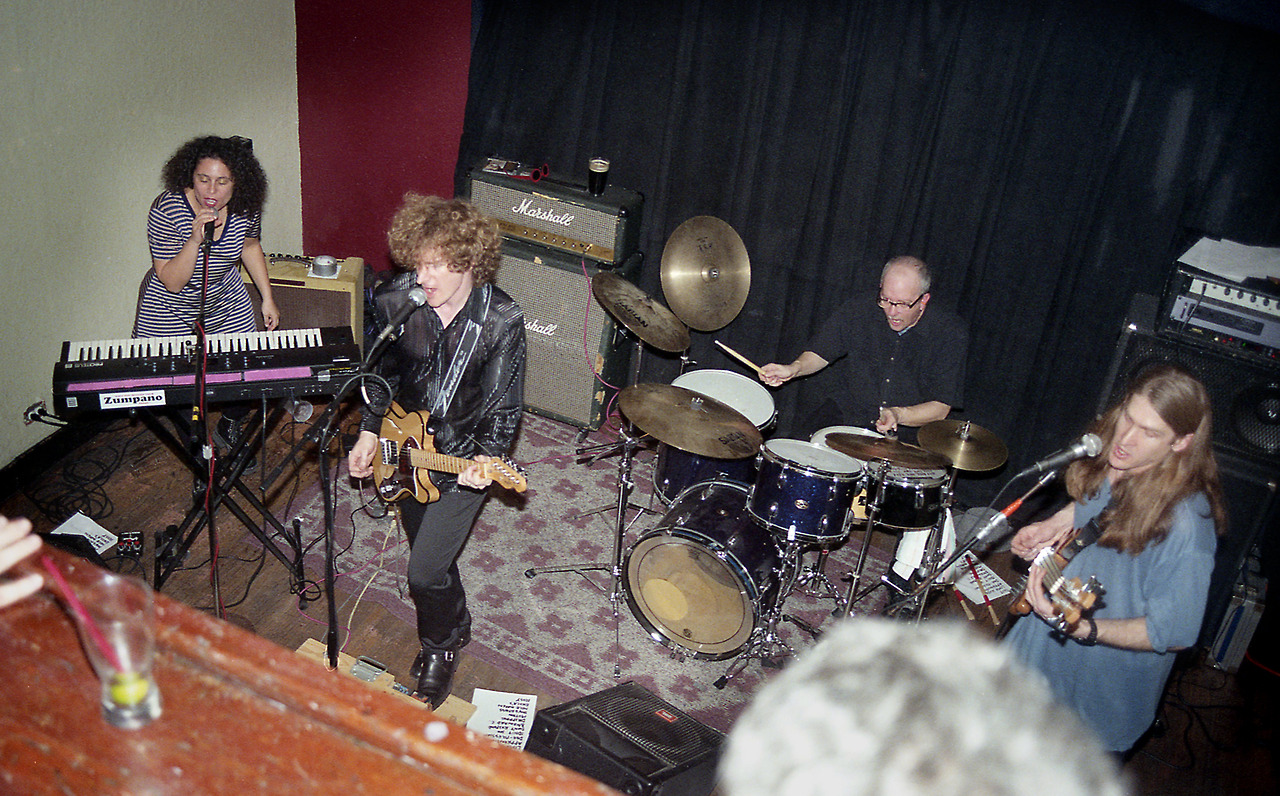
- The Loud Family performing at Hotel Utah, San Francisco, about 1999. Left to right: Alison Faith Levy, Scott Miller, Gil Ray, Kenny Kessel. (Photo: Robert Toren.)

Background information
- Origin: San Francisco, California, United States
- Genres: Power pop, jangle pop
- Years active: 1991–2006
- Labels: Alias, 125 Records
- Spinoff of: Game Theory, Alternate Learning
- Past members: Scott Miller; Jozef Becker; Zachary Smith; Paul Wieneke; R. Dunbar Poor; Kenny Kessel; Dawn Richardson; Mike Tittel; Alison Faith Levy; Gil Ray
- Website: loudfamily.com

The Loud Family was a San Francisco-based power pop band formed in 1991 by songwriter and guitarist Scott Miller, who previously led the 1980s band Game Theory. The Loud Family released six studio LPs and one live LP from 1991 through 2006. After Miller's death in 2013, three Loud Family members participated in recording sessions for Supercalifragile (2017), Miller's posthumous Game Theory album.

== Background ==
Scott Miller, founder of the group, was a singer, songwriter and guitarist. Prior to forming the Loud Family, he was best known as the leader of the band Game Theory. Miller and his bands were often described as cult favorites, finding critical acclaim but little commercial success.

In 1977, Miller formed Alternate Learning (also known as ALRN), his first band to release commercial recordings, along with future Loud Family bandmate Jozef Becker. Alternate Learning released a self-titled 7-inch EP in 1979, and a full-length LP called Painted Windows in 1981, on Rational Records. Alternate Learning was based in Davis, California, and frequently performed at U.C. Davis. Miller dissolved Alternate Learning in May 1982.

Game Theory was founded by Miller later in 1982. From 1982 to 1990, Game Theory released seven studio albums (including two EPs), distributed from 1985 to 1988 by Enigma Records, with later CD compilations and re-releases on Alias Records. Initially formed in Davis, the group changed personnel and moved its base to the San Francisco area after recording the album Real Nighttime (1985).

The early Game Theory was described as a "pseudo-psychedelic pop quartet" for which Miller sang and wrote almost all of the material. The group, a college-rock favorite associated with the Paisley Underground scene of L.A. and Davis, developed a strong cult following.

In 1989 and 1990, Game Theory's final touring line-up introduced several of the songs that would later appear on the Loud Family's debut LP.

Miller nominally disbanded Game Theory in 1990, and continued to perform shows as a solo artist in the Bay Area until forming his new band.

== Musical career ==
=== Formation ===
By late 1991, Miller had formed the Loud Family, which began playing Bay Area clubs that year.

Drummer Jozef Becker stayed on from the final 1989–1990 line-up of Game Theory; Becker had previously been a member of Thin White Rope, as well as Miller's earlier band Alternate Learning.

Miller and Becker were joined by three members of This Very Window: guitarist Zachary Smith, keyboard player Paul Wieneke, and bassist R. Dunbar Poor, who had at various times been co-workers with Miller at Lucid Inc. Miller had produced "For Beginners Only," a 12-inch single released by This Very Window in 1988. He described Poor and Wieneke as "hypermusically educated guys from Stanford," noting that Wieneke had earned a Ph.D. in music there.

Zachary Smith became lead guitarist for the Loud Family, with Miller moving to rhythm guitar until Smith's departure after The Tape of Only Linda (1994). Smith had appeared as a guest musician on Lolita Nation (1987), and had previously played guitar in a short-lived band with Donnette Thayer called No Matter What, before Thayer joined Game Theory.

Miller stated that he had chosen not to use the name Game Theory out of deference to its past members, rather than "passing off this lineup as yet another Game Theory." According to Poor, the members of This Very Window had each signed on individually to join Game Theory, and the group had rehearsed several times before Miller "decided that the energy and sound of the band was different enough to warrant a new name."

The Loud Family was named after a real-life family that was the subject of the television documentary An American Family. Miller later described the intended reality-show metaphor: "Going through life is a lot like having cameras on you and you have to perform, but there's no script; you just have to do the normal kind of bumbling thing. Besides, it had the word 'loud' in it." Rolling Stone described the name as both "a hip allusion to the mid-Seventies PBS series" and "a clever way to describe the sound and feel of the band. Either way, it's a great hook – smart, funny and instantly memorable. All of which, appropriately enough, are qualities shared by Miller's songs."

=== Releases on Alias Records (1993–2000) ===
The Loud Family debuted on Alias Records in 1993 with Plants and Birds and Rocks and Things. The album was produced by Mitch Easter, who had produced Game Theory's records since 1986's The Big Shot Chronicles.

According to the Los Angeles Times, the band's debut album (named after a phrase from America's song "A Horse with No Name") established the Loud Family as "critics' faves" upon its release. Spin referred to the Loud Family as a more evolved version of Game Theory, with "a bunch of interspersed jangle and woof" and a "more guitar-heavy approach."

Spin noted that "Miller's songs and voice are immediately identifiable. Interpersonal relationships are discussed in sweet, brusque terms." According to Miller, those songs reflected a "depressing time" of his life, a three-year period in which "I'd lost my girlfriend ... and I'd lost my band. There was also a period where I got laid off from my job. I was hitting rock bottom, nothing was working out in my life at all. It seems like I was always in some state of trying to get things together, trying to get my situation out of some state of brokenness and hopelessness. I missed everything – I missed having a record deal and making records; I missed playing live."

Plants and Birds and Rocks and Things was later acclaimed by Aimee Mann as "one of the five best records ever made" and "a record that I listened to like a million times."

A follow-up EP, Slouching Towards Liverpool, was released later in 1993. It included songs that had previously been recorded as demos by the final line-up of Game Theory, including Michael Quercio, in late 1989.

The Tape of Only Linda (1994) took its name from a legendary bootleg concert recording of the isolated backup vocals of Paul McCartney's wife, Linda.

In 1995, Zachary Smith and R. Dunbar Poor left the band. Poor was replaced by bassist Kenny Kessel.

The band's 1996 release, Interbabe Concern, included the song "Don't Respond, She Can Tell," for which the band recorded a black-and-white music video inspired by Ernie Kovacs. While touring with Aimee Mann in support of the album, Miller told the Los Angeles Times that he was unwilling to compromise artistic purity in return for stardom and riches, but still hungered for an opportunity to make his living as a full-time musician.

The 1998 album Days for Days featured more line-up changes, with Gil Ray of Game Theory joining as drummer, and Alison Faith Levy on piano and keyboards, bringing a softer edge and more mature feel to the music. Describing Levy's contribution, Miller stated, "To me she brought in that classic 1967 to '74 way of doing piano pop–rock that I'm all in favor of but can't accomplish because I don't play piano. She had the most sheer musicianly keyboard chops of anyone I've played with. And her vocals are pretty distinctive. More toward the soul end of things than other female singers I've had in the band. So that line-up had more of a Todd Rundgren, Cat Stevens, Rod Argent, Carole King approach."

The album Attractive Nuisance appeared in 2000, and was expected by Miller to be the final one for the group. After touring in 2000 in support of Attractive Nuisance, the band's recording contract with Alias Records expired.

=== Releases after disbanding ===
==== 125 Records (2001–2006) ====
Although the Loud Family took a six-year hiatus from recording for a variety of career and family related reasons, Miller signed with 125 Records during 2001. The independent recording label, then newly formed, was founded by Joe Mallon and Sue Trowbridge, who had a long acquaintance with Miller and his bands. As its fifth release, 125 Records released a live CD by the Loud Family.

From Ritual to Romance featured performances recorded live in San Francisco on October 5, 1996, and August 8, 1998, featuring band members Miller, Kessel, Levy, Ray, Wieneke, and Tittel, with guest vocals from Anton Barbeau. Three of the songs on this CD were covers ("Here Come the Warm Jets" by Brian Eno, "Debaser" by the Pixies, and "When You Sleep" by My Bloody Valentine). Critic Brett Milano, writing in the Boston Phoenix, praised the band's "usual blend of finely crafted pop hooks, elusive yet resonant lyrics ... and more self-depreciation", citing the album's opening medley with "dark, ominous keyboards ... and a throat-shredding Miller vocal; it's the sound of a band who'd explode if they hadn't gotten to play those songs at that minute." Scram magazine wrote that the live CD showed the band's "rough, antagonistic power ... which made the fundamental prettiness of the music seem more touching and fragile," calling the concluding songs "a closing salvo that left me breathless and punching the replay button."

In 2003, the label released a concert tour documentary on DVD, Loud Family Live 2000. The DVD, directed by Danny Plotnick, included live performances of 20 songs, along with band interviews and tour footage.

Scott Miller was persuaded by 125 Records to record the 2006 CD What If It Works?, a final studio collaboration between Miller and Sacramento pop musician Anton Barbeau. Members of the Loud Family also contributed to the album, and at the label's request, the album was credited to "The Loud Family and Anton Barbeau," to avoid confusion between Miller and a similarly named country musician. The Sacramento Bee called the album "a mixture of sweet pop and jangly rock," as if "the Beatles were covered by the Replacements." USA Today described it as a "terrific album... by one of underground pop-rock's best-kept secrets, the Loud Family."

==== After Scott Miller ====
At the time of Miller's death in 2013, he had begun work on the album Supercalifragile, intending to revive the name Game Theory, rather than release it under the Loud Family name. The album was completed after Miller's death by producer Ken Stringfellow and Miller's wife Kristine Chambers, who enlisted Miller's past bandmates and musical collaborators to turn Miller's incomplete set of recorded guitar and vocal tracks, sound notes, acoustic demos, and other materials into a finished album. Miller had long intended the album to be a collaborative project; he had approached Stringfellow several years earlier, and had co-written one song with Aimee Mann and several with Stéphane Schück.

The Loud Family's Jozef Becker, Gil Ray, and Alison Faith Levy participated in recording sessions for Supercalifragile in 2015 and 2016, which included a song co-written by Levy as a posthumous collaboration with Miller. Other partially-completed Miller songs were posthumously co-written with Jon Auer, Doug Gillard, Ted Leo, Will Sheff, Anton Barbeau, and Stringfellow. The album was released in August 2017.

== Critical reception ==
According to Scram magazine's Kim Cooper, "Just because you write the smartest pop lyrics of your generation, and have a master angler's facility with hooks, and a few thousand people love what you do, that doesn't mean anything. Scott learned that in the nineties, and left the gentle fields of Game Theory for pricklier experiments as the Loud Family."

Although they were praised by critics and fellow musicians – notably Aimee Mann and Stephin Merritt of The Magnetic Fields – and adored by a small fan base, mainstream success eluded the band throughout the 1990s. Though this may have been connected, in part, to lingering association with Game Theory's connections to the no-longer-hip 1980s "college rock" scene, it was more likely due to the group's complex, unpredictable song structures, and to Miller's cryptic lyrics, which tended to place rock's standard lyrical concerns (love, heartbreak, alienation, nascent spirituality, etc.) within the much-wider contexts of modernist literature, politics, art history, semiotics, relativity and contemporary academic sociocultural theory.

In 1996, CMJ New Music Monthly′s review of 1996's Interbabe Concern categorized the music as "pop of the most depraved variety," and wrote, "There's always some jarring detail added or subtracted, some unsettling minor component that takes these tunes out of the realm of the normal. Gently plucked acoustic guitars will suddenly be ripped apart by a mutinous fuzzbox, seemingly at random." The review continued, "If pop's purpose is to soothe and delight, then this is either half-pop or fullblooded mutation/mutilation, as there's nothing soothing about this in the least. It's disturbing, but the sort of disturbance you'll be whistling at work.

Conversely, by 2000, the Chicago Tribune noted the group's more mature direction, citing Miller as a "quirky visionary" contemplating "real-life riddles" such as the "facts of entropy," and quoting the line "I don't know what the radio wants when the radio taunts." Attractive Nuisance was criticized as "not as consistently strong as some earlier outings," and drew praise for its "supple melodies" that contrasted with "dense, often opaque lyrics ... whether exploring the lush orchestral contours of 'One Will Be the Highway,' the nearly avant-garde interludes of 'Save Your Money' or the acid metal roar of 'Nice When I Want Something.'"

In a 2003 book, Sonic Cool: The Life & Death of Rock 'n' Roll, the Loud Family was cited as "perhaps the most sophisticated 'pop' band that ever lived." According to author Joe Harrington, "the songs are beautiful, but they inevitably lampoon some aspect of the culture with biting accuracy. It's the perfect juxtaposition between old/new Pop/Punk that makes the Loud Family simply too good to be true in this day and age."

== Discography ==
=== Studio albums and EPs ===
Year	Title	Format	Label
1993	Plants and Birds and Rocks and Things	LP, cassette, CD	Alias
1994	Slouching Towards Liverpool	CD, 10-inch EP	Alias
1994	The Tape of Only Linda	LP, cassette, CD	Alias
1996	Interbabe Concern	CD	Alias
1998	Days for Days	CD	Alias
2000	Attractive Nuisance	CD	Alias
2006	What If It Works? (as The Loud Family and Anton Barbeau)	CD	125 Records

=== Live albums ===
Year	Title	Format	Label
2002	From Ritual to Romance	CD	125 Records

=== Singles and promotional releases ===
Year	Title	Format	Label
1993	Never Mind the Camera Crew	cassette	Alias
1993	"Take Me Down" b/w "The Come On"	7-inch	Alias
1994	"It Just Wouldn't Be Christmas"	CD single	Alias
1997	"Don't Respond, She Can Tell"	CD single	Alias

=== Various artist compilations ===
Year	Title	Format	Label
1993	Hot Cinnamon Churros	CD	Alias
1993	Alias with a Bullet	CD	Alias
1994	Streamlined	CD	Alias
1995	Star Power	CD, cassette	Pravda
1995	Sing Hollies in Reverse	CD	eggBert
1996	Premium: New Music With A Golden Glow	CD	Alias
1996	For Discriminating Tastes: The Alternative Distribution Alliance CD Sampler	CD	Alternative Distribution Alliance
1997	Come and Get It: A Tribute to Badfinger	CD	Copper
1997	Year of the Wagon	CD	Alias
1997	Yellow Pills, Vol. 4	CD	Big Deal
1999	The 26th Commandment: Thou Shalt Expand Thy Mind	CD	Ptolemaic Terrascope

=== Music videos and DVDs ===
Year	Title	Album	Notes
1993	"Jimmy Still Comes Around"	Plants and Birds and Rocks and Things	music video, directed by Lucy Phillips and Glen Scantlebury
1994	"Soul Drain"	The Tape of Only Linda	music video, directed by Sondra Russell
1994	"Marcia and Etrusca"	The Tape of Only Linda	music video, directed by Sondra Russell
1996	"Don't Respond, She Can Tell"	Interbabe Concern	music video, directed by Sondra Russell, produced by Jeff Orgill for Giant Tarantula Productions
2003	Loud Family Live 2000	DVD	concert tour documentary, directed by Danny Plotnick
