= Plants and Birds and Rocks and Things =

1993 rock debut album

Studio album by the Loud Family
- Released: 1993
- Recorded: 1992
- Studios: Soma Sync; Music Annex; Avy
- Genres: Rock; power pop; sound collage
- Length: 57:25
- Label: Alias
- Producer: Mitch Easter

The Loud Family chronology
| Plants and Birds and Rocks and Things (1993) | Slouching Towards Liverpool (1993) |

Plants and Birds and Rocks and Things is the 1993 debut studio album by the Loud Family, a band formed by singer, songwriter and guitarist Scott Miller after the dissolution of his 1980s band Game Theory. It was Miller's fifth album to be produced by Mitch Easter.

== Background ==
The end of an exhaustive and turbulent tour promoting Game Theory's fifth album Two Steps from the Middle Ages, left musician Scott Miller strained and without a band. The frontman attempted to regroup with Michael Quercio on bass, Jozef Becker of Thin White Rope on drums, and Gil Ray, the only other Game Theory holdover remaining, on guitar. However, little momentum was achieved in this incarnation; leading to Miller shuttering the band for good by 1990.

Miller spent the interim working on new material he felt could fit in with the current alternative rock scene. Under the moniker of The Loud Family, Miller enlisted Becker on drums, Zachary Smith on lead guitar, Paul Wieneke on keyboards, and R. Dunbar Poor on bass. By 1991, Miller sent demo tapes to his colleague Brett Milano, a publicist at Alias Records; Milano thought Miller's work was "some of the best songwriting I’d ever heard" and got the band a deal at the label.

The title of the album, Plants and Birds and Rocks and Things, is derived from a verse in "A Horse with No Name" by America. Meanwhile, the band's name, "The Loud Family" is borrowed from the television documentary series An American Family. Miller spoke of the rebranding in 1993, saying "The four years that have elapsed since Game Theory's final album is all the time it takes for everyone who knew about you who was DJ'ing at college radio stations to graduate."

Mitch Easter, who collaborated with Game Theory on every album since Real Nighttime, produced Plants and Birds and Rocks and Things. Easter encouraged Miller to create a more accessible album than their previous outputs. Easter had grown frustrated at Miller's lack of commercial success, saying in 2015, "I was sick of vicariously getting my feelings hurt as the world failed to recognize him -- I was starting to think he should go with Mutt Lange next time, so he can have a fucking hit."

Recording took place at Soma Sync Studios in San Francisco, as well as Music Annex Studios and Avy Studios in Menlo Park, California. According to reviewer Steve Simels, the album is "essentially an extended sound collage, with non-sequitur sound effects, songs, and snippets of songs running into each other."

== Reception ==
Professional ratings
Review scores
| Source | Rating |
|---|---|
| AllMusic | 5/5 stars |
| Chicago Tribune | 2.5/4 stars |
| Christgau's Consumer Guide | (neither) |
| Rolling Stone | 4/5 stars |

Rolling Stone's 1993 review, by rock critic J.D. Considine, stated that "Miller puts his emphasis not on the words but on the melodies, and that pays off big time with songs like 'Sword Swallower,' the power-poppy 'Isaac's Law' and the driving, guitar-crazed 'Jimmy Still Comes Around'." Compared to Game Theory's work, the lyrics remained "obsessed with arcana," but Considine concluded that "when his songs boast choruses as catchy as the one in 'Take Me Down (Too Halloo),' odds are that you won't really care what the lyrics mean."

According to Spin, "Sonically, the Loud Family offers a more guitar-heavy approach than Game Theory did, but Miller's songs and voice are immediately identifiable. Interpersonal relationships are discussed in sweet, brusque terms." Spin reviewer Byron Coley cited "the power of the sweet science that exists in Miller's songs," despite "interspersed jangle and woof."

Wired said, "Before somebody inevitably describes the Loud Family as 'clever pop' and you go off sneering, be advised that this is the new musical phoenix risen whole and rocking from the ashes of the late great Game Theory." Citing imagery "lifted from a decade's worth of old books, TV shows, and rock songs, plus patented Scott Miller tongue-in-tweek lyrics (priceless song title: 'Ballad of How You Can All Shut Up')", Wired called the band "the aftermath of a high-speed collision between several solid pop bands and the cast of Firesign Theatre."

Trouser Press wrote "Over the course of this nineteen-tune compendium of moody meandering, razor-edge power pop, cracked psychedelic introspection and weirder-than-weird ear candy, it’s clear that Miller is back in a big way."

In a 1996 book, Rolling Stone's Scott Schinder wrote that Miller's "off-center genius didn't skip a beat as he transferred his unique perspective to his new group, whose musical muscularity gave his hook-intensive tunes the sonic clout to make them knockouts." In the 2002 book All Music Guide to Rock: The Definitive Guide to Rock, Pop, and Soul, reviewer Mark Deming wrote that "Miller's uncanny way with a hook remains unsurpassed" in this album, even as his "eccentricities" took "center stage alongside his ... uniquely melodic pop songs." Comparing this album to Miller's self-described "young-adult-hurt-feeling-athons" on early Game Theory albums, Deming wrote that "here hurt gets co-star billing with rage, anger, paranoia, and self-destructive angst; thematically, Plants and Birds and Rocks and Things slips into a lyrical darkness far deeper than Game Theory at its moodiest, making this pure pop for those who have a good time being unhappy." Steve Simels of Stereo Review commented that, in 1993, many music critics (including himself), reacted to the album "as if it was the second coming of the Beatles' 'White Album.' And with good reason: in terms of sheer musical inventiveness, it nearly was."

Aimee Mann cited the album as a major influence on her debut release, Whatever, and called it one of her favorite records of all time.

== Track listing ==
All tracks are written by Scott Miller except when noted.

Plants and Birds and Rocks and Things track listing
| No. | Title | Writer(s) | Length |
|---|---|---|---|
| 1. | "He Do the Police in Different Voices" | | 2:30 |
| 2. | "Sword Swallower" | | 1:44 |
| 3. | "Aerodeliria" | | 3:00 |
| 4. | "Self Righteous Boy Reduced to Tears" | | 1:06 |
| 5. | "Jimmy Still Comes Around" | | 4:19 |
| 6. | "Take Me Down (Too Halloo)" | | 3:11 |
| 7. | "Don't All Thank Me at Once" | | 1:26 |
| 8. | "Idiot Son" | | 2:40 |
| 9. | "Some Grand Vision of Motives and Irony" | | 2:44 |
| 10. | "Spot the Setup" | | 2:12 |
| 11. | "Inverness" | | 4:11 |
| 12. | "Rosy Overdrive" | | 6:04 |
| 13. | "Slit My Wrists" | | 2:48 |
| 14. | "Isaac's Law" | Zachary Smith | 3:50 |
| 15. | "The Second Grade Applauds" | | 2:45 |
| 16. | "Last Honest Face" | | 4:43 |
| 17. | "Even You" | | 3:35 |
| 18. | "Ballad of How You Can All Shut Up" | | 1:21 |
| 19. | "Give in World" | | 3:15 |
| Total length: | | | 57:25 |

== Personnel ==
The Loud Family

- Jozef Becker - drums and percussion
  backing vocals on "Take Me Down (To Halloo)" and "Spot the Setup"
- Scott Miller - vocals and rhythm guitar
- R. Dunbar Poor - bass guitar
  backing vocals on "Aerodeliria", "Take Me Down (To Halloo)", "Idiot Son", "Spot the Setup", and "Rosy Overdrive"
- Zachary Smith - lead guitar
  backing vocals on "The Second Grade Applauds" and "Spot the Setup"
- Paul Wieneke - keyboards and backing vocals
  fake tabla drums on "Self Righteous Boy Reduced to Tears", fake acoustic guitar on "Slit My Wrists", mellotron on "Even You"

Additional personnel

- Don Tillman - ARP 2600 on "The Second Grade Applauds"
- Gil Ray - recorder on "Inverness", temple blocks on "Idiot Son"
- Mitch Easter - backing vocals on "He Do the Police in Different Voices", tambourine on "Last Honest Face" and "Give in World"
- Shalini Chatterjee - backing vocals on "Ballad of How You Can All Shut Up", bass guitar on "Don't All Thank Me at Once"
- Joaquin Maguire - fence

Production

- Mitch Easter - producing, engineering
- Paul Wieneke - additional engineering
- R Dunbar Poor - additional engineering, special digital effects processing
- Kyle Johnson - additional engineering
- Pat Coughlin - additional engineering
- Jane Scolieri - additional engineering
- Bob Ludwig - mastering
- Mirena Hwang Kim - art direction
- Robert Toren - photography
- Jozef Becker- disk surface design
- Jon Wells - legal services
- Shalini Chatterjee - screaming mouth on cover
