= Anton Barbeau =

American singer-songwriter (born 1967)

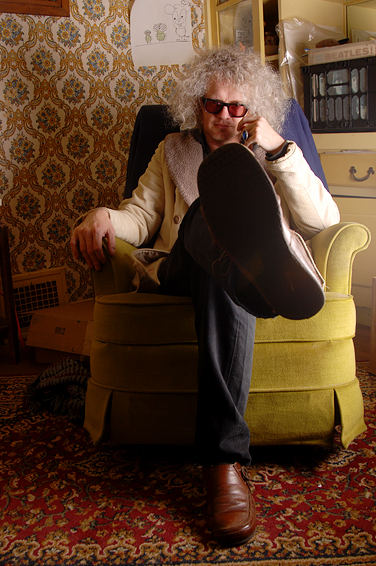
- Barbeau in 2008

Background information
- Born: April 24, 1967 (age 59)
- Origin: Sacramento, California, US
- Genres: pop; singer-songwriter; psychedelic
- Occupation: Musician
- Instruments: Vocals; guitar; piano; synthesizer; bass; drums; Mellotron
- Years active: 1984–present
- Labels: Beehive Sound; Big Stir; Fruits de Mer; Mystery Lawn Music; Think Like A Key Music; You Are The Cosmos
- Website: antonbarbeau.com

Anton Barbeau is an American singer-songwriter and producer from Sacramento, California. He is a multi-instrumentalist, playing guitar, piano, bass guitar, drums, synthesizers, and Mellotron.

Barbeau is known for combining surreal lyrics with pop melodies and has been described as a devotee of the songwriting tradition of Robyn Hitchcock, Syd Barrett, XTC, and The Beatles. He has performed on bills with artists including Hitchcock, Julian Cope, The Bevis Frond, Weezer, Mono, and a reformed Bay City Rollers.

His first CD, The Horse's Tongue, a collection of songs that had appeared on a number of self-released cassettes, won Sacramento's SAMMIE Award for Album of the Year in 1994.

Since then he has released more than twenty albums, a number of singles and EPs, several anthologies, and collaborations with other artists. In the early 2000s, Barbeau began working extensively in the UK. His album King of Missouri was recorded in Bromley with neo-psychedelic band The Bevis Frond. The launch gig for Barbeau's following album, Guladong, took place at the famous Cavern Club in Liverpool.

Barbeau's collaboration with The Loud Family singer/guitarist Scott Miller, the album What If It Works?, was released in 2006. In the same year, Barbeau's albums Drug Free and In the Village of the Apple Sun were released; the latter was described as "an instant lost psychedelic classic".

Since then, Barbeau has resided mainly in England and Europe. Automatic Door was released in the UK on Oxford's Shifty Disco label in 2007 and in France on Volvox in 2008. Other UK releases include Plastic Guitar (2009) and Psychedelic Mynde of Moses (2010).

Barbeau has also written and produced two albums with Sacramento singer Allyson Seconds, wife of 7 Seconds' singer Kevin Seconds. Her first album, Bag of Kittens, was released in fall of 2009. The second, Little World, was released in 2016 to critical acclaim, and featured guests such as Colin Moulding (of XTC), Kimberley Rew (of The Soft Boys and Katrina and the Waves), and Scott Miller.

From 2010 to 2015, Barbeau performed in the band Three Minute Tease with Andy Metcalfe and Morris Windsor – erstwhile members of Robyn Hitchcock-led The Soft Boys/Egyptians. The band recorded two albums, Three Minute Tease and Bite The Hand, and toured the UK, including a supporting slot for New Zealand songwriter Don McGlashan.

Barbeau has also recorded and performed with Stornoway, Michael Urbano, Robbie McIntosh, Kimberley Rew, and members of Cake. Barbeau supported Julian Cope on Cope's 2011 and 2012 UK tours.

In 2016, Barbeau released Magic Act, his first post-Three Minute Tease album, and his first full-length vinyl release on Spain's You Are The Cosmos label. The album was also released on CD in the US on Mystery Lawn Music. The CD and LP versions feature different mixes of the lead-off track, "High Noon," with alternate bass and drum performances from Colin Moulding and Michael Urbano.

Natural Causes, the followup to "Magic Act," was released in 2018 as a joint release between Gare du Nord (UK) and Beehive Sound (US). The album was also released in Spain in 2019 on the Rock Indiana label. Berliner Grotesk, the third album in Barbeau's Transfiguration Trilogy, was released in 2019 on the Pink Hedgehog label. Kenny vs Thrust was recorded with two different bands and released on Big Stir Records. His album Manbird was released in September 2020 as a 2CD set on the Gare du Nord label. This was followed by the July 16, 2021, release of Oh The Joys We Live For on Big Stir Records. Power Pop!!! was released on March 25, 2022, on the Big Stir Records label. His double album Morgenmusik/Nachtschlager was released on September 22, 2023 by Think Like A Key Music.

Barbeau is currently based in Sacramento, California.

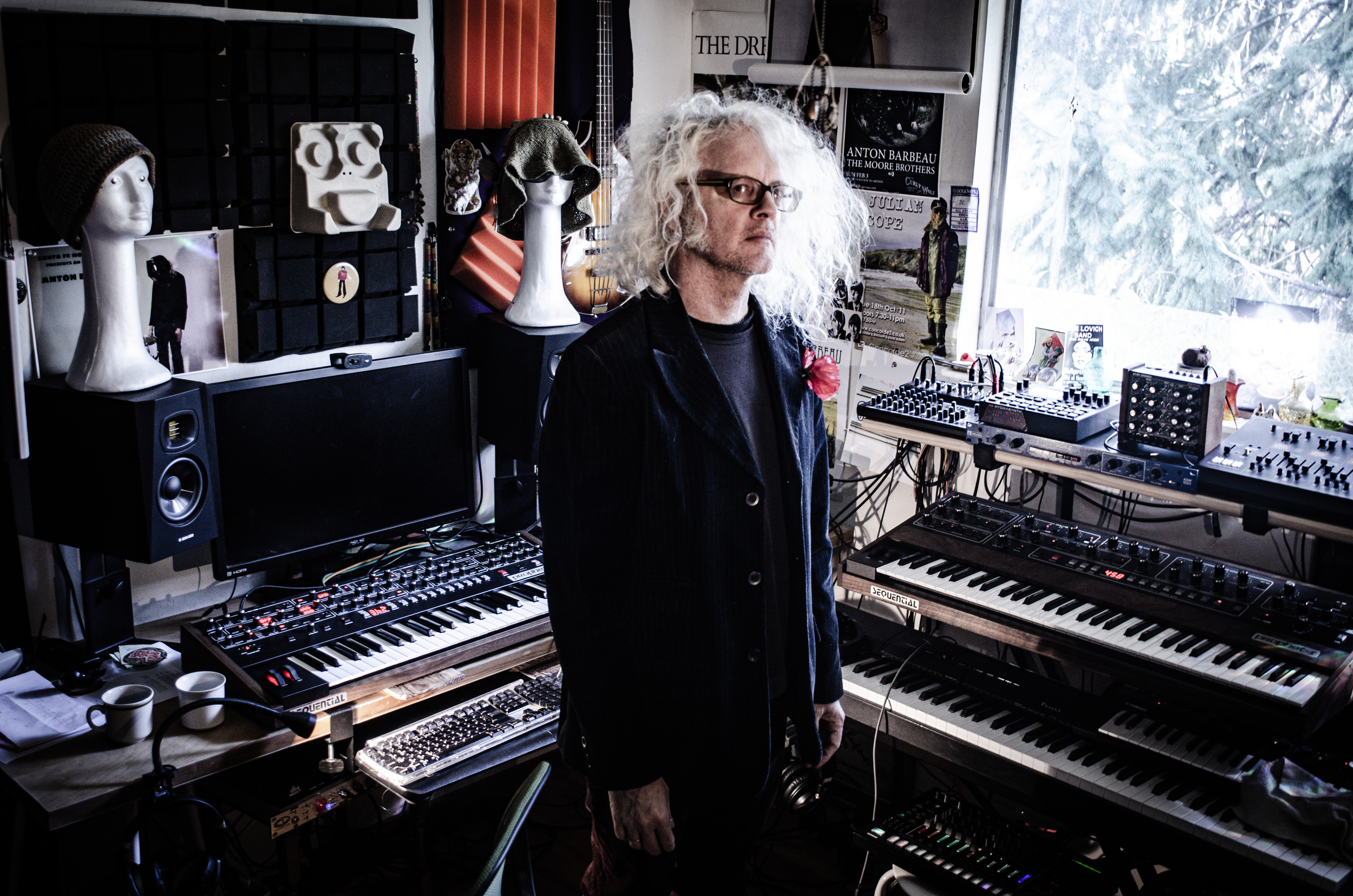
Barbeau in 2024

== Discography ==
- The Horse's Tongue (with the JoyBoys) (1993)
- Waterbugs and Beetles (1995)
- Antology Vol. 1 (1999)
- A Splendid Tray (1999)
- 17th Century Fuzzbox Blues (2000)
- Mood Hat Live (limited edition) (2000)
- The Golden Boot: Antology Vol. 2 (2001)
- Will Ant for Frond (limited edition) (2002)
- King of Missouri (2003)
- Guladong (2003)
- King of Missouri (reissue) (2005)
- Waterbugs and Beetles (reissue) (2006)
- What If It Works? (with The Loud Family) (2006)
- In the Village of the Apple Sun (early editions contained bonus CD) (2006)
- Drug Free (2006)
- The Automatic Door (with Su Jordan) (2007)
- Running Without Scissors (cassette) (2009)
- Plastic Guitar (2009)
- Bag of Kittens (with Allyson Seconds) (2009)
- Psychedelic Mynde of Moses (2010)
- Empire of Potential (compilation) (2011)
- Three Minute Tease (Three Minute Tease) (2011)
- Antronica (2014)
- Bite the Hand (Three Minute Tease) (2014)
- Distortion Schlager (cassette) (2014)
- Magic Act (2016)
- Little World (with Allyson Seconds) (2016)
- Natural Causes (2018)
- Antronica 2 (2018)
- Berliner Grotesk (2019)
- Kenny vs Thrust (2020)
- Manbird (2020)
- Oh The Joys We Live For (2021)
- Power Pop!!! (2022)
- Stranger (2022)
- Morgenmusik/Nachtschlager (2023)
- Polynormal AB (2023)
- Glitch Wizard (2025)
- Dig the Light (2025)

== Family ==
Barbeau is a cousin of the actress Adrienne Barbeau.
