= Alison Faith Levy =

American singer-songwriter

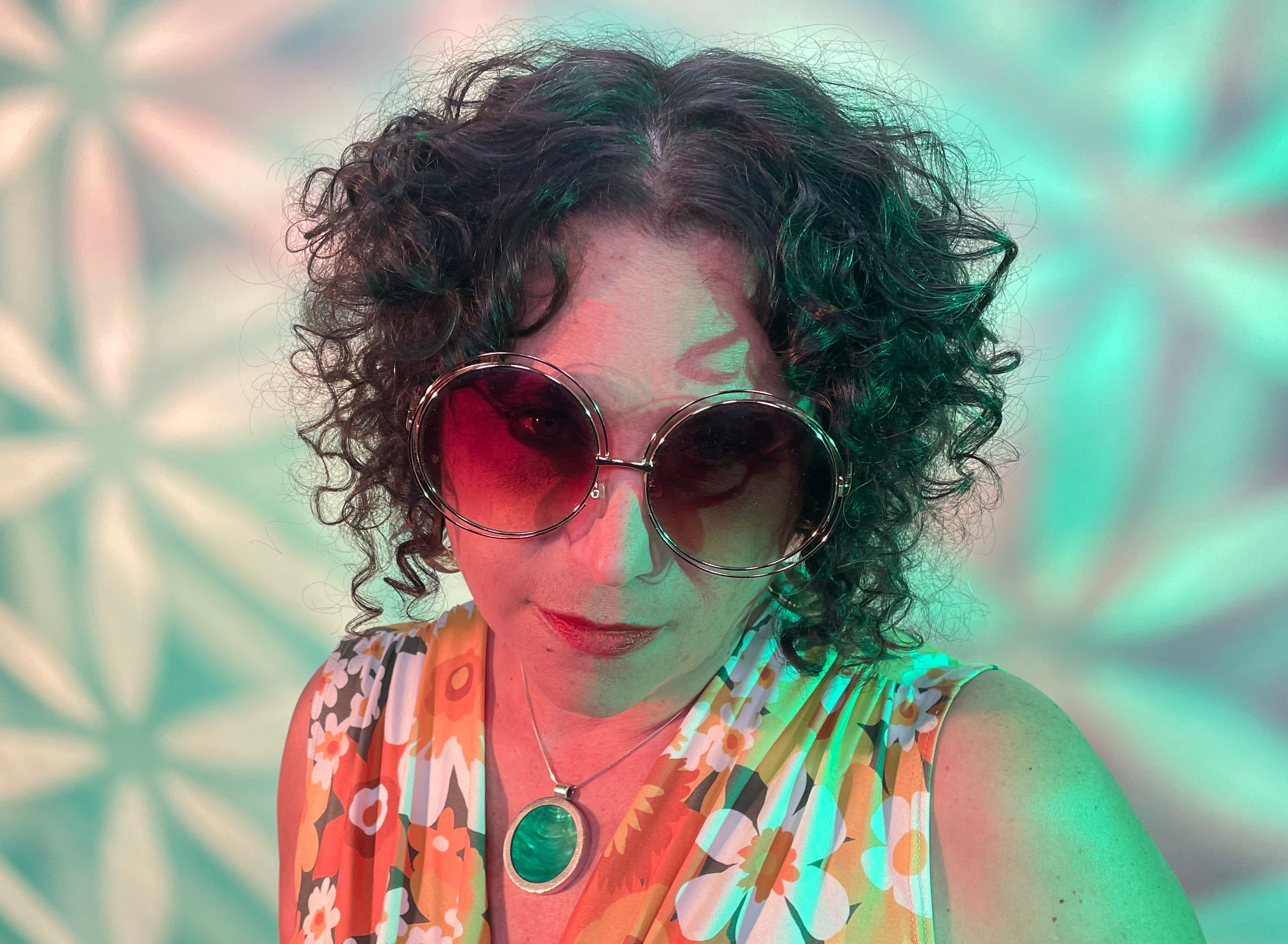
- Alison Faith Levy, 2025

Background information
- Born: Pittsburgh, PA
- Origin: San Francisco
- Genres: Children's music; power pop; jangle pop; retro soul
- Occupation(s): Musician, songwriter, educator
- Instrument(s): Keyboards, vocals
- Years active: 1994–
- Labels: Mystery Lawn Music; 125 Records; Snacker Disc; Alias
- Website: Official website

Alison Faith Levy is a San Francisco-based musician and songwriter, known as a pop performer on keyboards and vocals, most notably as a member of power pop group The Loud Family, as well as for her later work as a children's musician in The Sippy Cups and as a solo artist.

== Musical career ==
=== Rock, Pop, Experimental & Soul ===
Alison Faith Levy's career spans years of genre-tripping projects. From the intellectual indie pop of the Loud Family to the psychedelic children's music of The Sippy Cups, from the Americana roots of McCabe & Mrs. Miller to the experimental improv of Mushroom, from creating the theme to The Best Show with the Theme Weavers, to her own successful solo releases, Alison continues to grow and explore new paths as an artist. Her current project, with Grammy-nominated producer Alec Palao, mines classic studio sounds of the 60s and 70s for a soul-stirring album of new original songs, to be released in early 2026.

Levy played keyboards and piano and provided backup vocals on the Loud Family's album Days for Days. On the group's album Attractive Nuisance (2000), Levy also wrote and performed lead vocals on the song "The Apprentice."

Describing Levy's contribution to the Loud Family, Scott Miller stated, "To me she brought in that classic 1967 to '74 way of doing piano pop–rock that I’m all in favor of but can’t accomplish because I don’t play piano. She had the most sheer musicianly-keyboard chops of anyone I’ve played with. And her vocals are pretty distinctive -- more toward the soul end of things than other female singers I’ve had in the band. So, that line-up had more of a Todd Rundgren, Cat Stevens, Rod Argent, Carole King approach."

Shortly after the release of the Loud Family's Days for Days, Levy also issued her full-length solo debut, The Fog Show. She released a second solo CD, My World View, two years later.

With alternative rock musician Victor Krummenacher of Camper Van Beethoven, she formed the Americana music rock band McCabe and Mrs. Miller.

Levy joined San Francisco psychedelic jazz collective Mushroom, and appears as keyboardist and vocalist on a number of their CDs. Levy also performed with British folk rock tribute supergroup The Minstrel in the Galleries, featuring John Wesley Harding.

With Jad Fair's guitarist Chuck Marcus, Levy formed the experimental group Sonoptic, which released the album Chore Overload in 1999.

=== Children's music ===
Turning to children's music, Levy was a founding member of the Sippy Cups, with whom she released the CDs Kids Rock for Peas (2005), Electric Storyland (2006), and The Time Machine (2009), and the four-song mini CD Snail Song & Magic Toast (2005).

Levy's first solo CD of children's music, World of Wonder, produced by indie pop musician Allen Clapp of The Orange Peels, was released in 2012. The Start of Things (2015), her second solo children's CD, contains upbeat music with subtle themes of self-expression, self-empowerment and self-acceptance. You Are Magic, the last of her trilogy of solo albums for children, was released in 2021.

== Theatre, film and video ==
Levy is married to the independent filmmaker and author Danny Plotnick, and scored a number of his films. Levy appeared in Plotnick's 2003 rock documentary Loud Family Live 2000 and his 1999 short film Swingers' Serenade, and she co-wrote and co-directed the short film I, Socky with him.

Their son, Henry Plotnick, is a jazz musician in New York.
