= The Accelerators =

American rock band

- Also known as: Accelerators
- Origin: Raleigh, North Carolina, United States
- Genres: Alternative rock College rock Rockabilly; Power pop Roots rock
- Years active: 1982–2000
- Labels: Dolphin; Profile; Sound Asleep Records
- Spinoff of: Moon Pie
- Past members: Gerald Duncan; Doug Whelchel; Chris Moran; Keller "Skip" Anderson; Mike Johns; Brad Rice; Chris Henderson; Jon Wurster; Ron Bartholomew; Dave Bartholomew; Michael Batts; Bo Taylor; Chris Henderson; Mark Auble

The Accelerators were an American rock band from Raleigh, North Carolina, United States. They were formed in 1982 by singer/guitarist Gerald Duncan and released five albums. Writer and critic Peter Eichenberger described the band as "one of the best rock 'n roll bands in the world [because of] great songs perfectly rendered."

== History ==
The Accelerators had their origins in the early 1980s as the Greenville, S.C. band Moon Pie which recorded on EP, Welcome to Hard Times. In 1982, three members of Moon Pie, along with their manager and producer Dick Hodgin, moved to the growing music scene in Raleigh and changed the band's name to The Accelerators. The original lineup featured Gerald Duncan on lead vocals/guitar, Doug Whelchel on drums, Chris Moran on guitar/vocals, and Keller "Skip" Anderson on bass. Musically, "their songs are raw-edged sketches of drive-ins, fast-cars, beer joints and teenaged passion framed in the muscular sound of rockabilly-influenced pop and rock."

=== Dolphin Records ===
After relocating to Raleigh, Moon Pie was picked up by Dolphin Records, operated by the regional retail chain Record Bar, and was included in the label's compilation album Mondo Montage. In 1983, Dolphin released the Accelerators debut album, Leave My Heart, which was produced by Don Dixon, bassist/singer of Arrogance, who also played on the album. A portion of the album was recorded at Mitch Easter's (Lets Active) Drive-in Studio, and Easter also played on two tracks.

Despite his acclaim for working with R.E.M. and the Smithereens, one reviewer noted, "Dixon overembellished some of the songs, diminishing their impact." However, the album was recommended by Billboard and The Village Voice. Rolling Stone's Dave Marsh was also positive, describing the recording as "bar band soul and rock, with lyrics that are post-punk humorous and direct from Springsteen land at the same time."

To promote the Leave My Heart, the band released low-budget music videos for the songs "Stiletto" and "Leave My Heart," both directed by Steve Boyle. The latter was shot in the Record Bar warehouse. The Accelerators opened for The Clash at Chapel Hill and several other college dates in 1984, and for Nick Lowe in Los Angeles in 1985. Despite this publicity and some airplay on college radio, promotion of the album was stunted because the band's representative from Dolphin was fired before Leave My Heart was released.

=== Comboland ===
Writer Geoffrey Cheshire III convinced Raleigh's Spector magazine to sponsor Greetings from Comboland, a three-cassette promotional sampler of 26 North Carolina bands, including several tracks from The Accelerators. The expression "comboland" was coined by Mitch Easter and referred to the music scene in the Raleigh area. In 1985, the unpaid Cheshire went to Europe with the tapes, gaining enough interest that the British indie label Waking Waves Records released the album Welcome From Comboland: A Collection of Twelve Artists from North Carolina that included The Accelerator's single "Leave My Heart." Cheshire's efforts also led to the BBC's weekly television show, The Old Grey Whistle Test, traveling to North Carolina to produce the segment "A Visit to Comboland" which included an interview with the band and a partial performance of their song "Tears." Covering several bands, the 20-minute segment was filmed at The Brewery in Raleigh in September 1985 and aired on BBC Two on October 29, 1985. It was promoted as "Andy Kershaw's report on Comboland, birthplace of the new American rock 'n' roll." One American critic called the segment "a concise, enthusiastic segment that offers a sample of the variety and depth of rock 'n' roll in North Carolina, the home of many bands that don't get enough appreciation on their home turf."

=== New Music Seminar ===
In July 1988, The Accelerators joined other North Carolina bands in New York City for the annual New Music Seminar. The band's showcase performance was at the Lonestar Roadhouse in Manhattan and was a success. According to Jean Rosenbluth, news editor of Billboard, "It was one of the few times in a New York club that I've seen a band able to get people up and dancing. And there was not much a dance floor there, so it was quite a feat."

=== Profile Records ===
The Accelerator's Leave My Heart caught the attention of Cory Robbins of Profile Records who signed the band for a multi-album deal, resulting in The Accelerators (1987) and Dream Train (1991). Both albums showed lineup changes: Chris Moran and Keller Anderson left in 1987 and were replaced by Mike Johns on bass and Brad Rice on guitar—resulting in an all Upstate South Carolina lineup. Doug Whelchel was replaced by Jon Wurster for the Dream Train sessions.

The Accelerators included an updated version of "Two Girls in Love" from Leave My Heart, as well as new songs written by Duncan, Rice and Johns--who also sang lead vocals on two tracks. The production team included Dick Hodgin, Rod Abernathy and Don Dixon, Profile hired Grammy–winning Janet Perr to design the album's cover which featured photos taken at King's Motel on South Wilmington Street in Raleigh. The band promoted the album via a national tour, along with the release of singles "Stayin' Up in the City" and "What is Real." The Accelerators was reviewed by Rolling Stone and was selected by Billboard magazine for its "New and Noteworthy" section. The Billboard reviewer said the songs were "absolutely riveting" and the album was "too good to ignore".

It was a complete surprise to the band that Profile failed to provide an adequate promotional budget for their next album, Dream Train. Manager Hodgin stalled on the album's release for more than a year, hoping the label would concede. Dream Train was finally released in 1991 and featured twelve songs, seven written by Duncan. Without help from Profile, Hodgin sent the album to local radio stations, unexpectedly getting one track from the album, "Boy and Girl." in heavy rotation.

Knowing they had a potential hit that would never be realized because of their label, The Accelerators asked to be released from their contract with Profile. As Profile let the band go, its national media director, Tracy Miller, said, "They're a great band, and I can understand their frustration. It's really difficult for an independent label to break new acts... We just can't compete with somebody like John Cougar on Mercury." In reality, Profile had gained success with Run-D.M.C. and was focusing its resources on more profitable hip-hop artists. In 2006, Cory Robbins, co-owner of Profile who signed The Accelerators, noted that another issue was that his partner "hated the band," creating a rift that led to the demise of Profile a few years later.

=== D.E.S. and Sound Asleep Records ===
Unsuccessful in their search for a new label, The Accelerators self-released their final studio album Nearer (2000) under the label D.E.S. Records. Duncan said Nearer was released independently, "Because I work for the state, they [the credit union] gave me a loan, though I didn't tell them it was for a record." Nearer was produced by Charles Desmond White, instead of Hodgin, but was recorded at Jag Studio in Raleigh, where all previous albums were also recorded. For Nearer, Duncan wrote twelve of its thirteen tracks and played with bassist Ron Bartholomew, guitarist Dave Bartholomew, and drummer Chris Henderson.

Jerker Emanuelson, owner of the Swedish label Sound Asleep Records, was a fan of Nearer and contacted the band. In collaboration with Duncan, Sound Asleep released The Accelerators compilation album Road Chill in 2007.

== Hiatus and break up ==
Because of delays with the band's third album and personal differences, The Accelerators dissolved after recording Dream Train and members moved on to other projects. Duncan began performing solo as a singer-songwriter. When Dream Train was finally released in June 1991, the band had not played live for three years, and Duncan and Wurster were the only members willing to return. Duncan recruited new members, including bassist Ron Bartholomew (The Hanks, The Woods, and Robert Kirkland) to replace Mike Johns who had joined the band Fluffy, and Bo Taylor to replace guitarist Brad Rice who had joined the band Finger. With this new lineup, The Accelerators emerged from hiatus and played for the first time on October 4, 1991, at The Brewery in Raleigh.

Wurster continued playing with The Accelerators for some time but eventually left to devote more time to Superchunk, which he had joined during The Accelerators's hiatus. He was replaced on drums by Michael Batts (Automatic Slim), brother-in-law of Bartholomew. Guitarist Taylor also left, and was replaced by Dave Bartholomew, brother of Ron. Although Duncan was the only remaining member who had worked on the band's three albums, the lineup of Duncan and the two Bartholomews would hold steady through to the band's self-released album Nearer (2000). After the recording sessions for Nearer, guitarist Mark Auble replaced Dave Bartholomew for limited promotional touring.

Shortly after releasing Nearer, the band gradually stopped touring and only played occasionally in the Raleigh-Chapel Hill area. Duncan—the band's founder, lead singer, and main songwriter—decided to retire after more than twenty years of devotion to The Accelerators and more than thirty years in the music industry. However, after working on the Road Chill compilation album, Duncan said, "Sometime around the mid-1990s, it was rumored that I had retired or was deceased or didn't matter anyway or something, so I set out [to] let anyone who cared know that I was, except for possibly the third, none of these." He expressed an interest in returning to the studio with producer Hodgin to record an album of new songs.

Hodgin, the band's manager and lead producer, worked with The Accelerators from its beginnings and went on to work with Clay Aiken, Corrosion of Conformity, Hootie and the Blowfish, and Lynyrd Skynard and also won a regional Emmy Award. Ron Bartholomew went on to play with Whiskeytown, Patty Hurst Shifter, Michael Rank and Stag, and Caitlyn Cary. Brad Rice's successful career includes Whiskeytown, Son Volt, Keith Urban, and Ryan Adams. In addition to Superchunk, John Wurster went on to play with many acts, including The Mountain Goats, Bob Mould, Katy Perry, Rocket from the Crypt, The New Pornographers, and R.E.M. Dave Bartholomew toured with Caitlyn Cary and Tres Chicas, and plays with Terry Anderson And The Olympic Ass-Kickin' Team.

On July 19, 2013, The Accelerators and several other bands performed a one-night tribute show for The Brewery.

== Discography ==
- 1983 - Leave My Heart (Dolphin Records)
- 1987 - The Accelerators (Profile Records)
- 1991 - Dream Train (Profile Records)
- 2000 - Nearer (D.E.S. Records)
- 2007 - Road Chill (Sound Asleep Records)
