= Cypress (album) =

Studio album by Let's Active
- Released: 1984
- Recorded: Spring 1984
- Studios: Drive-In, Reflection
- Genres: Pop, power pop
- Label: I.R.S.
- Producers: Let's Active, Don Dixon

Let's Active chronology
Afoot (1983)	Cypress (1984)	Big Plans for Everybody (1986)

Singles from Cypress
- 1. "Blue Line" Released: 1984

Cypress is the debut album by the American band Let's Active, released in 1984. The band supported the album by opening for Echo and the Bunnymen on a UK tour. The first single was "Blue Line", a cover of a song by the Outskirts. Cypress peaked at No. 138 on the Billboard 200 and was also a success on college radio stations.

== Production ==
Let's Active included Mitch Easter on guitar, Sara Romweber on drums, and Faye Hunter on bass, with the latter two departing after the album was completed. Cypress was produced by the band and Don Dixon and recorded during the spring of 1984 at Drive-In Studio in Winston-Salem, North Carolina, with the band using many first takes. After lightning struck the studio, Let's Active finished the sessions at Reflection Studios, in Charlotte. The band tried for a "light" style and sound on the Afoot EP but went for spontaneity and feeling on Cypress. "Blue Line" is a cover of a song released in 1981 by English band the Outskirts. Shortly before her death in 2013, Hunter explained: "I found the Outskirts single of this song when visiting family in London way back when and fell in love with it. That's how we ended up covering it."

== Critical reception ==
Professional ratings
Review scores
Source	Rating
All Music Guide to Rock	5/5 stars
Robert Christgau	C+
The Encyclopedia of Popular Music	2/5 stars
The Great Indie Discography	4/10
Omaha World-Herald	4/5 stars
The Philadelphia Inquirer	3/4 stars
The Rolling Stone Album Guide	2.5/5 stars

The Philadelphia Inquirer said, "The melodies have a pretty lilt, as do the charmingly sour vocals, and the rough, speedy rhythms prevent the music from becoming merely attractive." The New York Times stated that the album "decorates relatively simple pop-song structures with quirky, intricately dense arrangements." The Globe and Mail opined, "The decorative Byrds and Beatle-pop evocations here ride that edge between charming and cloying, but there's nothing simple or shallow about Easter's abstract reworking of his sources or his emotionally charged lyrics." The Los Angeles Times praised the "playful, Monkees-style innocence."

Robert Christgau noted that "if only Mitch Easter had something to say, maybe Let's Active albums would sound as great as Byrds albums". The Houston Chronicle called Cypress "sound-sculpted album of weaving textures and convoluted dynamics". The Morning Call considered it to be among the best albums of 1984. In 2003, The Courier-Mail listed it as one of "10 Classic Power Pop Albums That Most People Have Never Heard". In 2004, Goldmine said that "the rhythmic switchbacks, fretboard flourishes and baroque mood of 'Lowdown' suggest a complex homage to Britain's Roy Wood and the Move."

== Track listing ==
No.	Title	Length
1.	"Easy Does"	3:24
2.	"Waters Part"	5:00
3.	"Lowdown"	3:42
4.	"Gravel Truck"	1:07
5.	"Crows on a Phone Line"	3:52
6.	"Ring True"	3:36
7.	"Blue Line"	3:00
8.	"Flags for Everything"	2:50
9.	"Prey"	3:30
10.	"Co-Star"	3:06
11.	"Ornamental"	3:21
12.	"Counting Down"	4:00
