= Leave My Heart =

Studio album by the Accelerators
- Released: October 1, 1983
- Studio: Drive-In; TGF; Audiophonic; Reflections
- Genre: Rock, power pop
- Label: Dolphin
- Producer: Don Dixon

The Accelerators chronology
Leave My Heart (1983)	The Accelerators (1987)

Leave My Heart is the debut album by the American band the Accelerators, released on October 1, 1983. It was a success on college radio stations. The band supported the album with a North American tour.

== Production ==
Produced by Don Dixon, the album was recorded at Mitch Easter's Drive-In Studio, TGF Studios, Audiophonic, and Reflections Studios. Easter played guitar on two tracks, "Leave My Heart" and "Jenny". The songs were written or cowritten by Gerald Duncan. "Stiletto", about a killer, was inspired by Stephen King's short stories and Duncan's interest in Jack the Ripper. It contains backwards guitar. "She's Fifteen" is a throwback to the band's rockabilly roots, although Chris Moran, the band's lead guitarist, thought that most of the album was "new Southern pop". "Regina" is about an interracial romance.

== Critical reception ==
Professional ratings
Review scores
Source	Rating
Robert Christgau	B
The Encyclopedia of Popular Music	3/5 stars
The Great Indie Discography	5/10
MusicHound Rock: The Essential Album Guide	2.5/5 stars
Rolling Stone	3/5 stars

The News & Observer called the album "dreadful" and said that "She's Fifteen" is among "the worst thing[s] ... recorded on vinyl." The Tennessean said that the Accelerators "play rock with toughness and power." Rolling Stone, in its syndicated column, stated that the album "is bar band soul and rock ... with post-punk humorous" lyrics.

Robert Christgau wrote that Duncan's "singing is so mild and his band so contained that only the most striking material lifts off." AllMusic noted that, "while less energetic than R.E.M.'s contemporary material, Accelerators' mature brand of rock & roll showed them in fine form." MusicHound Rock: The Essential Album Guide considered the album "period power pop".

== Track listing ==
No.	Title	Length
1.	"Leave My Heart"
2.	"Tonight"
3.	"She's the Only Girl I Can Stand"
4.	"Terminal Cafe"
5.	"The Alien Way"
6.	"Her Way"
7.	"Regina"
8.	"She's Fifteen"
9.	"Stiletto"
10.	"Tore Up"
11.	"Two Girls in Love"
12.	"Jenny"
