= The Cosmopolitans =

United States new wave band (1975–1982)

- Origin: New York City, New York, United States
- Genres: New wave
- Years active: 1975–1982
- Past members: Jamie K. Sims; Glen Tig; Harry Gantz; Greg Vines; Shaun; Karin Bradford; Nel Moore; Leslie Levinson; Evan "Funk" Davies; David "Itch" Britsch; Jeff Dedrick; Robert Crenshaw; Neil Winograd; Judy Monteleone; Catherine Harrington; Corey Sims
- Website: thecosmopolitans.org

The Cosmopolitans was a United States new wave band that was based in New York from 1979 until 1982, with notable songs "(How to Keep Your) Husband Happy" and "Wild Moose Party" released on Alan Betrock's Shake Records in 1980 (US), and Albion Records in 1981 (UK). The group was characterized by quirky choreography and lyrics, and their songs were often based on tabloid news stories. Shows often included 1960s go-go dance lessons, Wild Moose-call contests, baton routines, and chartreuse fake furs worn over blue mini-skirts.

== History ==
The Cosmopolitans originated at University of North Carolina at Chapel Hill as "the North Carolina Progressive Dance Troop". In 1977, Jamie K. Sims and Nel Moore moved to New York City. The two often go-go danced onstage with rock-scene friends the dB's and the Fleshtones. They also hosted 1960s go-go dance lessons at Club 57, teaching retro dance moves like the Jerk, the Watusi, and the Boogaloo.

On May 6, 1979, a benefit concert was thrown for the struggling dance group at CBGB. The bill included Monster Masher Bobby Pickett, The dB's, the Fleshtones, Information, and Big Help. At the show's end the Cosmopolitan Dance Troop performed one of their own satirical pop song and dance numbers. It was a hit with the new wave crowd. Sims shortened their name to the Cosmopolitans, and from then on began booking them at rock clubs instead of theaters.

By 1980 the Cosmopolitans were an all-female ensemble of Jamie K. Sims, Nel Moore, and Leslie Levinson. They performed Sims's songs and an assortment of covers to prerecorded backing tracks. These tracks were recorded by Sims on keyboards and fellow North Carolina musicians Mitch Easter and Chris Stamey on drums and guitars. During live performances Will Rigby often sat in on drums to augment the taped tracks. Levinson left later that year.

In the summer of 1980, Sims and Moore recorded a booking demo of three of Sims’s songs at Easter’s Drive-In Studio. Easter and Sims produced the session, with Easter also adding drums and guitar to Sims’s keyboards, vocals, and harmonica, and Moore’s harmonica and vocals. Alan Betrock released the tracks on his Shake Records label in October 1980. “(How to Keep Your) Husband Happy” and “Wild Moose Party” were dance-club hits and were played on New York rock station WNEW-FM. The songs were later released on the Shake to Date compilation LP. In 1981 Albion Records released the single “Husband Happy” in the U.K. backed with a new tune, “Chevy Baby.”

A short time after the Shake Records release, additional musicians were added and the Cosmopolitans evolved into a tape-free live band. Sims and Moore fronted the group with vocals, percussion, and choreography. Sims often added Ace Tone organ solos. The longest-lived lineup of live Cosmopolitans included drummer Evan "Funk" Davies, guitarist David "Itch" Britsch, and keyboardist Jeff Dedrick. Robert Crenshaw stepped in as drummer in late 1981. Moore left the group in 1982, and the final touring band featured Sims, Itch, Neil Winograd on drums, and Judy Monteleone on guitar. The group performed at some of New York's most high-profile rock clubs - including Hurrah, Max's Kansas City, the Mudd Club, CBGB, the Ritz, the original Peppermint Lounge, and Irving Plaza - and toured up and down the East Coast.

Sims disbanded the group in November 1982 when she contracted Epstein–Barr virus.

In 2003, Lee Joseph of Dionysus Records contacted Sims about releasing a Cosmopolitans retrospective CD, including unreleased studio and live tapes, plus the original Shake recordings of “Wild Moose Party,” “(How to Keep Your) Husband Happy”, and “Dancin’ Lesson.” During the dig for old tapes, a pre-MTV video of “Husband Happy,” directed by Michael Dugan, was also unearthed. The video includes band footage of their appearance on the Uncle Floyd Show, as well as the “Husband Happy” tips acted out by Faye Hunter, Mitch Easter, Rayna, Sims, and Moore. This enhanced CD, titled Wild Moose Party – New Wave Pom Pom Girls Gone Go-Go, NYC 1980–1981, was released in 2006 on the Bacchus Archives label.

The Cosmopolitans played a reunion concert on August 2, 2009, at Cat's Cradle, Carrboro, N.C., their first concert in 27 years. Don Dixon and Mitch Easter sat in with the group and also performed solo sets. Davies played drums, Nel Moore Nichols played harmonica and sang, and Sims provided lead vocals and played tambourine and toys. Britsch was unable to perform at the concert and Sims's brother, Corey Sims, played guitar and provided back-up vocals.

In March 2017 guitarist David "Itch" Britsch died. In May 2017 Judy Monteleone, Nel Moore's substitute during the final months of the group, died.
