= At Home with Bobby and Tim =

Studio album by the Windbreakers
- Released: 1989
- Studio: Terminal Records
- Genre: Power pop
- Label: DB
- Producer: The Windbreakers

The Windbreakers chronology
A Different Sort... (1987)	At Home with Bobby and Tim (1989)	Electric Landlady (1991)

At Home with Bobby and Tim is an album by the American power pop duo the Windbreakers, released in 1989. The album marked a reunion for Tim Lee and Bobby Sutliff, who had spent a few years working on solo projects. The band supported the album with North American tour.

== Production ==
At Home with Bobby and Tim was recorded at Terminal Records, in Pearl, Mississippi. Although a reunion album of sorts, Lee and Sutliff often worked separately, even listing in the liner notes which member played which guitar solo. Mitch Easter contributed production work to some songs. The initial CD version of At Home with Bobby and Tim included the pair's critically-praised album Terminal.

== Critical reception ==
Professional ratings
Review scores
Source	Rating
AllMusic	4/5 stars
Chicago Sun-Times	3.5/4 stars
Chicago Tribune	3/4 stars
Orlando Sentinel	4/5 stars

Trouser Press called the album "confident-sounding [and] smoothly crafted," writing that "the pair sounds as strong as ever on bittersweet originals like Lee’s 'Just Fine', Sutliff’s 'On the Wire' and a cover of Russ Tolman’s 'Portrait of Blue'." The Orlando Sentinel wrote that there is "an occasional touch of Tom Petty in the vocals and Alex Chilton in the no-frills execution, but the band has a low-key charm of its own on songs such as 'Just Fine' and 'On the Wire'." The Rocket considered it "a near-perfect pop album."

The Chicago Tribune opined that "Lee gives Sutliff's love-lost tunes a kick in the pants, and Sutliff's melodicism and concision have rubbed off on the ragged-voiced Lee." The Washington Post called At Home with Bobby and Tim the band's best album, writing that "every song boasts an attention- grabbing pop melody sustained by ringing guitar harmonies, yet the vocals are driven by the urgent sense of a personal crisis."

AllMusic wrote that "the pair turn out a brace of capable songs, some of which refine old styles and others of which explore new ground."

== Track listing ==
No.	Title	Length
1.	"Just Fine"
2.	"I Thought You Knew"
3.	"On the Wire"
4.	"Down to It"
5.	"Ill at Ease"
6.	"Cold, Cold Rain"
7.	"Our Little War"
8.	"Portrait of Blue"
9.	"Saw You Again"
10.	"Give Me a Reason"
11.	"Closer to Home"

== Personnel ==
- Tim Lee – vocals, guitars
- Bobby Sutliff – vocals, guitars
