= Afoot =

EP by Let's Active
- Released: 1983
- Recorded: June 1982 – March 1983
- Genres: Indie rock, jangle pop, power pop
- Length: 22:42
- Label: I.R.S. Records
- Producer: Mitch Easter

Let's Active chronology
| Afoot (1983) | Cypress (1984) |

Afoot is the debut six-song EP by the American indie rock band Let's Active, first released in 1983 by I.R.S. Records.

== Recording ==
The music on Afoot was recorded from June 1982 through March 1983. Recording was done at bandleader Mitch Easter's home recording studio, Drive-In Studio in Winston-Salem, North Carolina. The songs were presented as a demo to I.R.S., who quickly signed the band. The six songs were packaged as a mini album debut for the band and released in 12" vinyl EP format in late 1983.

During rehearsals at the Drive-In in November 1984 for the tour in support of Cypress, released that spring, Easter explained to deputizing drummer Jay Peck how Sara Romweber had to adjust her drum line for "Leader of Men" to fit the loop Easter had recorded:'

Do a normal phrase, and at the end of it, do a build-up. And you really just do that through the whole song. You should not pay any attention to where we are. She does [adjust] during the guitar break, but the idea was to make the drums sound really mechanical and machine-like.

— Mitch Easter, "Let's Active - 'Leader of Men' - Drive-In, Winston, Salem, N.C. - 11/01/84

== Track listing ==
All six songs were composed by Mitch Easter:

1. "Every Word Means No" – 2:57
2. "Make Up with Me" – 3:40
3. "Edge of the World" – 4:00
4. "Room with a View" – 3:48
5. "In Between" – 3:55
6. "Leader of Men" – 4:22

== Personnel ==
Let's Active:

- Mitch Easter – guitar, vocals
- Faye Hunter – bass, vocals
- Sara Romweber – drums

== Production ==
Easter produced all six tracks at Drive-In Studio. Scott Litt provided assistance with mixing.

Faye Hunter painted the cover art, musician/friend Richard Barone contributed additional photography, and the album design was credited to Carl Grasso.

== Reception ==
Although it sold only modestly, the EP was a prominent critical success. Trouser Press described the record as giving "new meaning to such overused pop adjectives as crisp, bright and ringing". In a particularly effusive retrospective review, AllMusic said "the entire EP is simply flawless" and called all six songs "brilliantly catchy".

Afoot was a major hit on college radio stations in late 1983–early 84. The opening track, "Every Word Means No", was particularly popular, and came to be regarded as a signature song for the group. In the late 1990s it was covered by Smash Mouth and featured on the Friends Again soundtrack (1999). It lent its name (partially) to the multi-band compilation Every Word: A Tribute to Let's Active (2003), and continues to endure as "a mainstay of '80s pop retrospectives".

Afoot was followed by the full-length album Cypress in 1984, and the two were combined in a single CD release in June 1989. This CD included two extra tracks, "Two Yous" and "Grey Scale," which had been available previously only on the UK vinyl release of Cypress.
