= Dynamico =

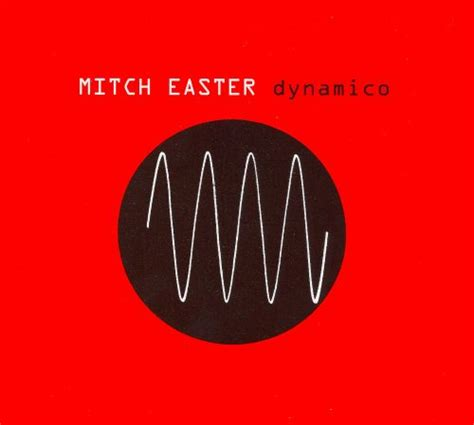

Studio album by Mitch Easter
- Released: March 13, 2007
- Recorded: mid-2006
- Genre: Rock
- Length: 51:11
- Language: English
- Label: Electric Devil Recordings
- Producer: Mitch Easter

Dynamico is a 2007 studio album by American rock musician and record producer Mitch Easter. It is his first solo release after several projects for decades, including Let's Active and has received positive reviews from critics.

== Reception ==
Editors of AllMusic Guide rated this release four out of five stars, with critic Mark Deming opining that Easter's "musical ideas are as keen as ever, and his instrumental skills remain impressive". A review in No Depression notes that Easter's hooks are "catchy as ever" and that his vocal performance has improved over his career; paired with his guitar playing, this results in "rock bona fides [that] are unimpeachable".

== Track listing ==
All songs written by Mitch Easter

1. "1 1/2 Way Street" – 3:40
2. "Break Through" – 3:28
3. "Time Warping" – 3:23
4. "You/Me" – 2:25
5. "Sudden Crown Drop" – 3:22
6. "Ton of Bricks" – 3:03
7. "Sights Set on Heaven" – 4:37
8. "Dusky Lair" – 4:12
9. "To Be, Cool Thing" – 3:52
10. "Why Is It So Hard?" – 3:57
11. "Phantoms of Ephemera" – 4:01
12. "Glazed" – 3:45
13. "I Want a New Scene" – 3:34
14. "Love Slaves to Paradise Lost" – 3:52

== Personnel ==
- Mitch Easter – vocals, instrumentation, engineering
- Matt Boswell – engineering
- Shalini Chatterjee – vocals on "1 1/2 Way Street", "Break Through", "Ton of Bricks", "Sights Set on Heaven", and "I Want a New Scene"; bass guitar on "Sights Set on Heaven"
- Brent Lambert – engineering
- Eric Marshall – drums on "Ton of Bricks"

== See also ==
- List of 2007 albums
