= Be Loud! Sophie Foundation =

US nonprofit organization

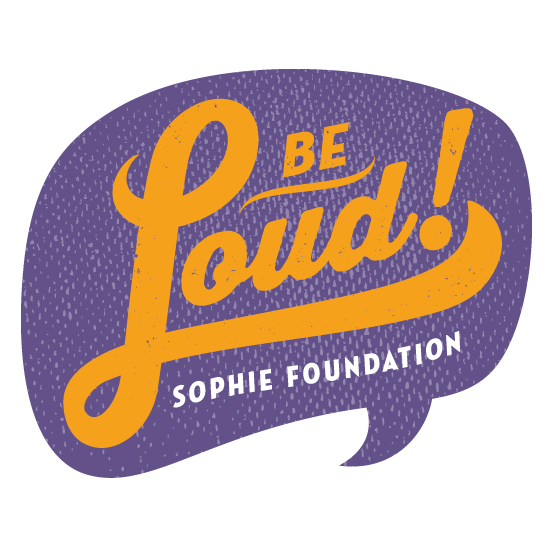
- Named after: Sophie Steiner
- Type: 501(c)(3) organization
- Location: Chapel Hill, North Carolina, U.S.
- President: Lucy Steiner
- Treasurer: Niklaus Steiner
- Website: beloudsophie.org

The Be Loud! Sophie Foundation is a nonprofit organization based in Chapel Hill, North Carolina, United States, which supports care for young adults with cancer at UNC Hospitals. It was established by the family of Sophie Steiner, who died from cancer at the age of 15. Its major event is an annual concert at Cat's Cradle, a music venue in the neighboring town of Carrboro.

== History ==
Be loud
And move with grace
Explode with light
Have no fear

— Sophie Steiner, excerpt from "Be Loud"

In 2012, 14-year-old Sophie Steiner, a freshman at East Chapel Hill High School, was diagnosed with metastatic germ-cell cancer, and died ten months later on August 30, 2013. Be Loud! targets an area which Steiner called the "no-man's land" between pediatric and adult oncology. Her mother told Indy Week:

We were so panicked by Sophie's health; I don't know that we cared that much at that point. You're in the hospital, and they want to entertain you to the extent that they can. And so the people who knock on the door, the creative arts people, the librarian—there's a lot of things like that at Children's Hospital. And all of those, without exception, did not feel to Sophie like they were for her.

Her sisters Annabel and Elsa, and her parents, Lucy and Niklaus Steiner, created Be Loud! to support patients and families in similar conditions. Be Loud!'s mission is "[t]o support adolescent and young adult cancer patients and their families at UNC Hospitals". The foundation is named after a poem written by Sophie on her blog.

== Fundraising activities ==
=== Concerts ===
Be Loud! has hosted concerts at the Cat's Cradle and Fearrington Village. The first Cat's Cradle concert, in 2014, reunited the band Let's Active, with the Pressure Boys headlining, also featuring The Connells, the Dex Romweber Duo, and A Number of Things. In 2015, the concert had the Red Clay Ramblers, Tift Merritt, Don Dixon. and Southern Culture on the Skids. At the 2016 event, performers included English Beat, Greg Humphreys' band Hobex, Chris Stamey's jazz group Occasional Shivers, Preeesh!, and others. The 2017 concert featured Atlanta band Drivin' N' Cryin', Rob Ladd and The Spressials (covering The Specials), and Triangle bands Hege V, the Backsliders, the Floating Children, and Boom Unit Brass Band. In 2018, musical acts included Matthew Sweet, Surrender Human, the Sex Police, the Veldt, Collapsis, and the Right Profile.

=== Other fundraising ===
A Boy Scout troop biked 66 days across the contiguous United States raising money for the organization. The foundation has also participated at local events, such as the Color the Hill run and the Blue Ridge 200-mile relay. A cupcake truck in St. Louis, Missouri, was created and sent all their profits to Be Loud!

== Young-adult cancer care ==
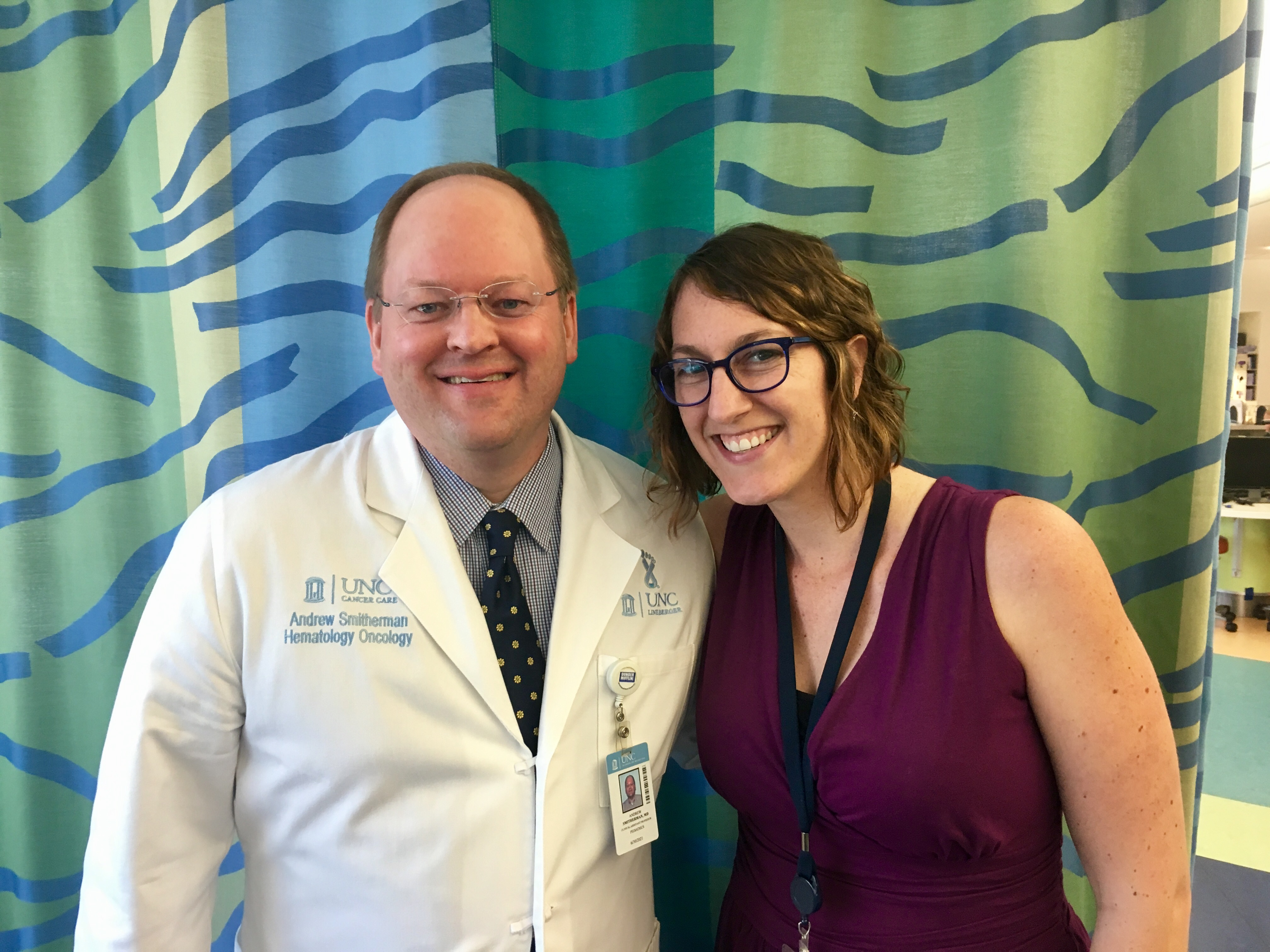
Andrew "Smitty" Smitherman, medical director, and Lauren Lux, AYA program director

The organization created a position at the UNC Lineberger Comprehensive Cancer Center for Lauren Lux, a clinical social worker, who works with cancer patients in their early-teens to mid-20s. For Be Loud!, Lux is the adolescent and young adults (AYA) program director. "Sometimes I describe my job by telling people, 'I'm here to make this suck a little less'", Lux told The Herald-Sun of Durham.

Lux's main role is coordinating schedules and offering activities for AYA patients at UNC. Be Loud! brings age-appropriate resources and services to patients to let them "be themselves". Lux has taken patients rock climbing at Pilot Mountain.
