= Turtle's Records & Tapes =

Defunct American retail chain

- Industry: Retailer
- Headquarters: Atlanta
- Products: Cassettes; Records; Concert tickets

Turtle's Records and Tapes was a Southern United States retail chain, based in Atlanta, that specialized in selling cassettes, records, and concert tickets; in the latter years of the chain's existence, it also rented movies in VHS format. Turtle's was recognized for its trademark logo, an upright standing turtle with its neck twisted around in several coils as he attempts to look backward.

It was known for its deep selection and one of the most varied video rental offerings in its markets before the arrival of the big chains such as Blockbuster Inc. Small gold coins with a turtle on one side and a record on the other were issued by the stores for gift certificates. The stores also issued savings stamps with each purchase. Customers were able to collect stamps in green-and-yellow Turtle's stamp collector booklets. Once a customer completely filled a saving stamp booklet, the booklet could be turned-in for a $5.00 credit toward store purchases.

Owned and incorporated by Al Levenson in 1977, the chain was regional in nature, concentrated in Georgia and Florida. Levenson sold the chain to Clinton Holding Co. of White Plains, New York around 1983 although he still remained in charge of its operations. At the time of the sale, the chain consisted of 26 stores in the Atlanta metro area, but by October 1986 the business had expanded to 70 stores with locations in cities such as Birmingham, Alabama, Tallahassee, Jacksonville and Macon.

In 1989 Clinton sold the chain, now numbering more than 125 stores, to Super Club North America Corp., a subsidiary of Philips. Blockbuster purchased Super Club, including the Turtle's Records chain, in 1993. Over the succeeding four years, Turtle's stores were converted into Blockbuster Music stores or merged with stores that Blockbuster owned at the time of the purchase of the regional record seller.

== See also ==
- Record Bar
