= Evan "Funk" Davies =

American radio DJ

Evan "Funk" Davies (born 1960) is a musician, DJ and online media developer based in the New York City, USA, area. He was a senior product manager at ASCAP until 2021. He hosts a weekly radio show each Tuesday at 3 pm on WFMU, a freeform radio station in New Jersey, where his signature is an opening song drawn most often from his extensive collection of 1970s new wave, glam rock and punk rock records. He was a DJ at WNYU. In January 2005, he DJed with music writer Ira A. Robbins at a tribute show for Greg Shaw, founder of Bomp! Records.

As a performer, "Funk" has a history in the NYC scene, including the longest-lasting drummer for seminal new-wave partiers The Cosmopolitans, which also included (at one time or another) Jamie K. Sims, David Itch, Nel Moore, Mitch Easter, Chris Stamey, and Will Rigby. Three singles by the Cosmopolitans and additional audio and video were released in May, 2006 on Bacchus Archives.
