= The Brewery =

The Brewery may refer to:

- The Brewery Art Colony, in Los Angeles, California, the largest live-and-work artists' colony in the world
- The Brewery (music venue), a music venue in Raleigh, North Carolina
- The Brewery (shopping centre), Romford, England
- The Brewery (rock band), Malmo, Sweden.
