= Big Plans for Everybody =

Studio album by Let's Active
- Released: 1986
- Recorded: Drive-In, Winston-Salem, North Carolina
- Length: 40:30
- Label: I.R.S.
- Producer: Mitch Easter

Let's Active chronology
Cypress (1984)	Big Plans for Everybody (1986)	Every Dog Has His Day (1988)

Big Plans for Everybody is the second studio album by the American rock band Let's Active, released in 1986 by I.R.S. Records. It was produced by band leader Mitch Easter at his own Drive-In Studio, in Winston-Salem, North Carolina.

It was the band's first album without drummer Sara Romweber, who left the band in 1984.

== Critical reception ==
Professional ratings
Review scores
Source	Rating
AllMusic	3.5/5 stars
The Philadelphia Inquirer	1/4 stars
Trouser Press	favorable

The Los Angeles Times determined that the album "combines lush, textured melodies with bright-eyed and bushy-tailed vocals." The Chicago Tribune wrote: "It's pop, it's Southern, it's quirky, it's ringing guitars, it's neo-psychedelic, it's haunting." The New York Times concluded that Easter "breaks the symmetry of ordinary pop tunes into irregular phrases, while his lyrics are quizzical and pessimistic." The Philadelphia Inquirer opined that "Easter's rock-group hobby founders this time around on a series of Beatle salutes and a tedious obsession with '60s rock."

== Tracklist ==
All songs written by Mitch Easter.

1. "In Little Ways" – 3:46
2. "Talking to Myself" – 3:30
3. "Writing the Book of Last Pages" – 3:56
4. "Last Chance Town" – 3:35
5. "Won't Go Wrong" – 3:21
6. "Badger" – 3:08
7. "Fell" – 3:37
8. "Still Dark Out" – 5:50
9. "Whispered News" – 4:34
10. "Reflecting Pool" – 2:26
11. "Route 67" – 2:47
