= Dream Train =

Studio album by the Accelerators
- Released: 1991
- Genre: Rock
- Label: Profile
- Producer: Dick Hodgin

The Accelerators chronology
The Accelerators (1987)	Dream Train (1991)	Nearer (2000)

Dream Train is an album by the American band the Accelerators, released in 1991. The album was barely marketed by Profile Records, prompting the band to ask for their release. The Accelerators subsequently broke up, with reunions taking place over the years that involved frontman Gerald Duncan backed by new musicians.

"Boy & Girl" was a regional radio hit; the band and local news outlets thought that it would have broken widely had the record label promoted it more.

== Production ==
The album was produced by Dick Hodgin. Jon Wurster played drums on Dream Train; he and Duncan had played together for two years. "Drivin'" is a love song that takes place in part at a rehab facility.

== Critical reception ==
Professional ratings
Review scores
Source	Rating
AllMusic	4.5/5 stars
Chicago Tribune	3/4 stars
The Encyclopedia of Popular Music	3/5 stars
Houston Chronicle	2.5/4 stars
MusicHound Rock: The Essential Album Guide	3.5/5 stars

The Chicago Tribune wrote that, "marked by plenty of ringing, melodic guitar and some smooth, warm, three-part vocal harmonies, this package of ballads, mid-tempo tunes and all-out rockers also sneaks in a bit of humor on 'Drivin'." The News & Observer deemed the album "a solid, eclectic piece of work that makes significant strides over the Accelerators' previous effort."

The Advocate called the album "hilarious," and noted the absence of "posturing to become big stars." The Houston Chronicle thought that "they don't set a fire, but they do snap and crackle in the rockin' 'Boy & Girl' and 'Drivin', and especially in the melancholy 'All of Blue', which features one of the neatest two-chord changes since Lou Reed." The Roanoke Times determined that "some tunes hinge on free-flowing country guitars... Others are short bursts of clean rock energy, packed with weighty beats and words wailing about busted love affairs during holiday seasons ('Christmas This Year'), outlaws lashing back at the world ('You've Got It All') and frustration at work ('Los Angeles Is Falling')."

Robert Gordon, in AllMusic, labeled the album "simple, basic, boy and girl White rock ... it's nice."

== Track listing ==
No.	Title	Length
1.	"Boy & Girl"
2.	"Drivin'"
3.	"Glenn"
4.	"Feel Alright"
5.	"Widow's Peak"
6.	"Don't Talk to Me"
7.	"Los Angeles Is Falling"
8.	"You've Got It All"
9.	"She's Not the One"
10.	"Where's Jeff"
11.	"Christmas This Year"
12.	"All of Blue"
