= Faye Hunter =

- Born: Faye Elizabeth Hunter; September 13, 1953
- Died: July 21, 2013 (aged 59) Advance, North Carolina, U.S.
- Genres: Power pop; jangle pop
- Occupation: Musician
- Instruments: Bass guitar; vocals

Faye Elizabeth Hunter (September 13, 1953 – July 21, 2013) was an American musician, best known as the founding bassist and co-vocalist for the 1980s jangle-pop band Let's Active, which hailed from Winston-Salem, North Carolina. She co-founded the band in 1981 with lead singer and guitarist Mitch Easter and drummer Sara Romweber. Hunter played on three of the band's four releases: Afoot (1983), Cypress (1984) and Big Plans for Everybody (1986).

== Early life ==
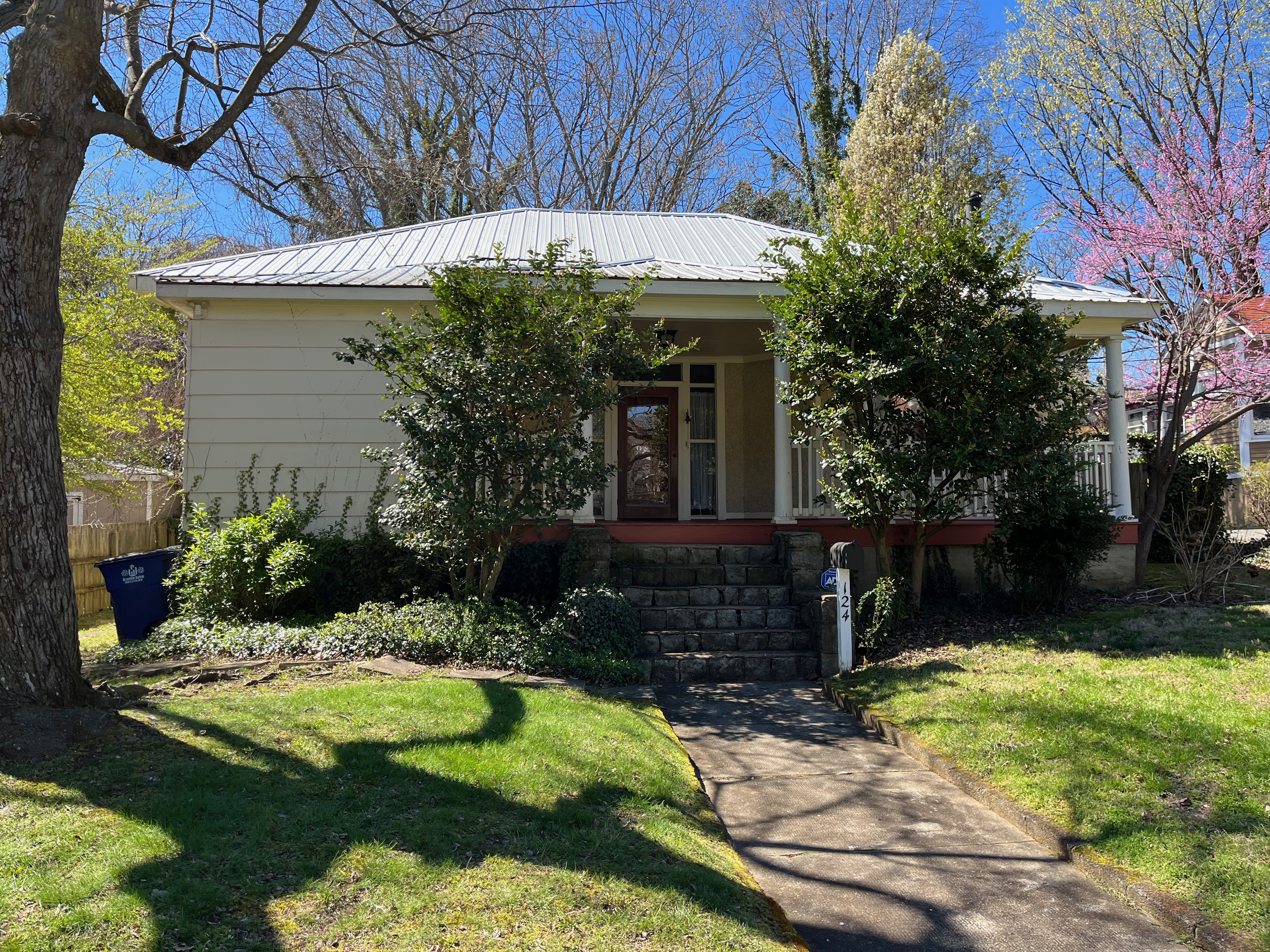
Hunter grew up in this home, at 124 Shady Boulevard in Winston-Salem, North Carolina.

Hunter was born in 1953 to Dallas Else Hunter and Rachel Jordan, one of their two daughters. She grew up in Winston-Salem, North Carolina, and graduated from the city's R. J. Reynolds High School. She briefly attended the University of South Carolina at Greensboro before beginning her musical career.

== Career ==
In 1981, a 28-year-old Hunter formed Let's Active with Mitch Easter, her boyfriend since high school, and drummer Sara Romweber. It was only then that she began to learn the bass guitar, having recently purchased one. Hunter played on the band's 1983 debut EP, Afoot, and first full-length album, Cypress (1984), and later contributed to their 1986 album, Big Plans for Everybody. Hunter painted the cover art for Afoot. Regarding her contributions on Cypress, Billboard wrote in its December 22, 1984, issue:

[Hunter] exhibited a tough inventiveness on bass, with her husky alto voice offsetting Easter's '60's-inflected tenor.

— Moira McCormick, "Talent in Action", Billboard (December 22, 1984)

In addition to her work with Let's Active, she appeared on recordings by other artists, including Chris Stamey, Marshall Crenshaw and The Windbreakers. She also played bass and sang in the New York band Timber, writing the lyrics for their song "Crankcase," which was featured on the Matador compilation LP NY Eye and Ear Control.

She later worked for Sotheby's, the Museum of Modern Art and Vanderbilt University. At the time of her death, she was working as a proofreader for Random House.

== Discography ==
=== Let's Active ===
==== EPs ====
- 1983: Afoot (I.R.S. Records)

==== Albums ====
- 1984: Cypress (I.R.S.)
- 1986: Big Plans for Everybody (I.R.S.)
- 1988: Every Dog Has His Day (I.R.S.)

== Personal life ==
For the last years of her life, Hunter cared for her mother, who survived Hunter by seven years. She died in 2020, aged 93.

== Death ==
Hunter died in 2013, aged 59, of an apparent suicide at her home in Advance, North Carolina. According to friends, she had been struggling with the stress of employment and caring for her elderly mother. Her obituary was written by music journalist Ed Bumgardner. In her memory, donations were requested for The Elephant Sanctuary in Tennessee or local animal shelters.
