= Record Bar =

The Record Bar is a former U.S. retail music/entertainment store chain founded in Durham, North Carolina. The company eventually grew from a single location to 180 stores. One of the largest music retailing chains, it was located primarily in the southeastern United States. From 1960 until the late 1980s, the owners were the (Barrie) Bergman family of Durham. In the mid-to-late 1980s, Record Bar began opening large new stores and remodeled Record Bar stores under the Tracks name, to better reflect the changes taking place in retail music merchandising (e.g.- large freestanding "super" stores like Peaches and Tower).

In October 1989, the company was sold to Super Club N.V., a Brussels, Belgium, video distribution company, by Barrie and his partners for $92 million (~$202 million in 2024). At that time, the Record Bar operated 167 stores in the southeastern United States and middle Atlantic states. In the early 1990s, Super Club sold Record Bar, Turtle's Records & Tapes and its other U.S. music and video rental acquisitions to Blockbuster Video. Blockbuster converted its music retail outlets to Blockbuster Music stores, ending the Record Bar chain name. By 2007, no entity using the Record Bar name had a previous affiliation with the Durham-based chain.

After selling Record Bar, Barrie Bergman and John Hansen purchased Bare Escentuals which was bankrupt. This four-store skin care company was consolidated into two stores. Mineral make-up became the focus instead of body lotions. After being featured on QVC and twenty-four stores later, Bare Escentuals was rescued from economic ruin and recapitalized for over $200 million 14 years later.

== History ==
=== Early history ===
On September 24, 1960, Harry and Bertha Bergman purchased the Record Bar, a single 800 sq ft (74 m^{2}) store in Durham. Gross sales for the first year total $125,000.

In 1962, the Bergmans enlarged the Durham store to 3,300 sq ft (310 m^{2}) to accommodate the growing selection of records. On August 11, 1963, Barrie Bergman married Arlene Macklin of Chapel Hill, North Carolina, and together they opened Record Bar's second location, on Henderson St. in downtown Chapel Hill. This store was the relocated Burlington Musicland which they renamed. The Beatles released their first American LP, Meet the Beatles in 1964. Barrie commented, "It didn't just change our business - it changed the world."

The Musicland record store opened in Burlington by Harry Bergman. This became the second Record Bar store in 1963 after it moved to a new location.

On August 14, 1966, Lane Bergman married Bill Golden, who joined the Record Bar as director of advertising and operations. In September 1967, Record Bar opened its first shopping center store in North Hills Shopping Center, Raleigh'. Manager Barrie Bergman said, "The first day in that store we did more business than we'd ever done in either of our other stores." Barrie and Bill were named vice presidents of Record Bar in 1968. At the age of 30, Barrie already had 16 years of experience in the record business. The following year, Rich Gonzalez joined the company as assistant manager of the downtown Durham store. The number of stores had grown to five, all in North Carolina.

=== 1970s ===
Bill Golden was named vice president of finance in 1970. On September 24, exactly 10 years after Mr. and Mrs. Bergman bought the original store, Record Bar #10 (Northgate Mall, Durham) opened. Two years later, annual sales reached $8 million. In 1973, Inventory levels in each store reached the $60,000 (~$322,571 in 2024) mark. Annual sales passed $13 million. Record Bar opened 20 new stores. The first convention was held on February 27–28, 1974, in the Hilton Inn, Atlanta. Frank Zappa, Harry Chapin, George Jones and Tammy Wynette attended. Average store gross rose to $356,000, with annual sales at $25 million.

Barrie was named National Association of Record Merchandisers (NARM) Merchandiser of the Year in 1975. Home office expandeds. Classical News and the Connoisseur Club debuted. The second annual convention was held in Los Angeles. Guests included Boz Scaggs, Andy Williams, Martin Mull and Kris Kristofferson. The First Hilton Head Convention was held in 1976 with the theme "Gimme Five" with a $5 million (~$21.4 million in 2024) holiday sales goal. The first "Accessory Explosion" promotion was held. Fleetwood Mac were in-store at store #3 in Chapel Hill, North Carolina. In October 1977, Record Bar opened a superstore, Tracks, in Norfolk, Virginia. The company had 75 stores with $27 million in sales. A new store prototype debuted at #90 in Charleston. Barriewas named "Personality of the Year" by Music Retailer magazine. In the following year, Grease and Saturday Night Fever soundtracks spurred sales of $42 million, with two stores topping the $1 million mark. Off the Record, the company newsletter, went monthly. The convention was held in Nashville with AC/DC and the Oak Ridge Boys headlining. A new candy bar style logo appeared. In 1979, Barrie and Barry Grieff founded City Lights label, with headquarters in New York City. Barrie became the youngest president in the history of NARM. The position of national supervisor was created. The convention theme wais "Everybody is a Star".

=== 1980s ===
Early 1980s

Record Bar opened its 100th store in Haywood Mall in Greenville, South Carolina, in 1980. The 20th Anniversary Convention theme was "Record Bar Goes Platinum", highlighted by the presentation of the first Bertha K. Bergman Award, given to Jackie Brown. Sales climbed to $56 million. Blank videotape appeared in stores for the first time. In the midst of an economic recession, Record Bar opened 34 new stores in 1981. Dolphin Records wais launched, with Brice Street's Rise Up In The Night the first release. The first Surf-About was held. Record World saluted Record Bar in a special 40 page section. The convention theme was "Record Bar Goes to Summer Camp".

By 1982, Record Bar employed over 1,300 people with 140 stores in the chain. The first employee handbook, The Inside Straight, was published. Video games were introduced in stores. A Five-Year Plan was unveiled. There was a "Summer Summit" Convention, with the first Vendor Day. Christmas holiday sales were the best ever. In the following year, Ron Cruickshank was named president and CEO. Barrie became chairman of the board and Mr. B chairman emeritus. Record Bar-Licorice Pizza Manager Exchange. The first Napoleon's Grocery opened in Charlotte. It was a Thriller Christmas, with sales up 14% over previous the December. "Welcome to Durham" Convention. Stevie Ray Vaughan and Double Trouble were among the headliners. They also played the following year’s convention in Hilton Head. 84 in '83. In 1984, the first shipments left midAMERICA Distributors, Inc., Record Bar's new video distribution company. A new store prototype opened in Colorado Springs' Citadel Mall (#110). Tracks Video opened in Virginia Beach. The second Napoleon's Grocery opened, in Durham. The $100 million sales goal was surpassed, with 17 stores at $1 million plus annually.

==== 1985 ====
Record Bar bought Licorice Pizza, bringing the total number of stores under the Record Bar umbrella to 194. A new 84,000 sq ft (7,800 m^{2}). distribution center in Durham was opened in September. Bill Golden was named to NARM's board of directors. Personal Development Lab opened at home office. Record Bar donated more than $400,000 in advertising and promotions to African relief efforts.

The first joint Record Bar-Licorice Pizza Convention in Hilton Head, South Carolina, was the last company convention. Entertainment included Stanley Jordan and John Cafferty and the Beaver Brown Band. The convention in September featured a Tony Robbins seminar with a firewalk in hotel parking lot which a great deal of publicity. The convention was subsequently mentioned in the book Firewalking and Religious Healing: The Anastenaria of Greece and the American Firewalking Movement by Loring M. Danforth, published by Princeton University Press, on page 255:

One of Robbins' most publicized seminars was held at Hilton Head, South Carolina, in September 1985 as part of the annual convention of Record Bar, Inc., the second largest retailer of records and tapes in the United States. The seminar, for which Robbins received seventy-five thousand dollars, was part of the company's "human systems" program for developing its workers' potential to the fullest. As the chairman of the board of Record Bar told a reporter, "If you can walk on hot coals, it's fairly easy to sell a record." (Handleman 1985)

A Halloween "Scratch and Win" promotion featured the first extensive Record Bar television promotional campaign.

1985 was a crucial year for the company. Its new distribution center did not function properly because of poor IT systems, almost taking the company under in the prime Christmas selling system.

==== Later 1980s ====
Ron Cruickshank resigns as president and CEO. Barrie Bergman reassumes both positions. The Licorice Pizza chain is sold to the Musicland Group in 1986.

In 1986, the third Tracks Music and Video store managed by Michael Vanderslice opened in Hampton, Virginia. The store grossed over $1.3 million exceeding the average store volume by over 50%. Based on this successful store opening, numerous other Tracks Music and Video stores were added leveraging video rental and music sales under one roof. Previous Record Bar stores were primarily within mall locations whereas Tracks stores were free-standing. These free-standing stores were also larger averaging 5,000 square feet (460 m^{2}) versus 2,200 square feet (200 m^{2}) for most mall stores. The following year, Record Bar was sold to Super Club N.V., a European video distribution company, which also purchased Turtles Music and Video, another Southeastern US music and entertainment retailer. Operations were consolidated in Atlanta, Georgia, and all North Carolina office functions were eliminated.

=== Blockbuster ownership ===
Super Club N.V. sold Record Bar and its other music retailing acquisitions to Blockbuster Video. Blockbuster rebranded all stores as Blockbuster Music, ending the Record Bar chain.
