= Let's Active =

American rock band

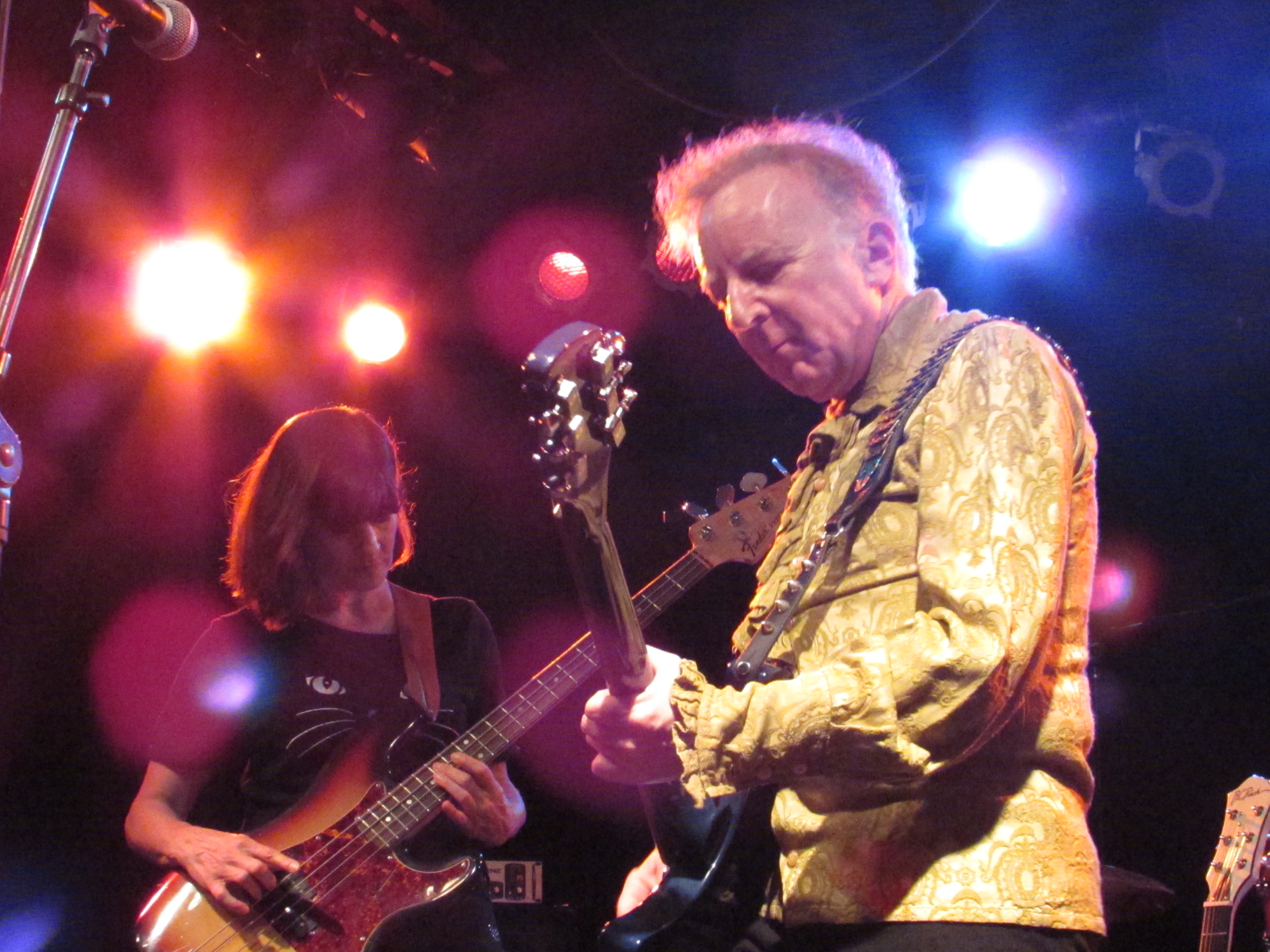
- Let's Active performing in 2014 (Suzi Ziegler, bass; Mitch Easter, guitar)

Background information
- Origin: Winston-Salem, North Carolina
- Genres: Jangle pop; power pop; alternative rock
- Years active: 1981–1990, 2014
- Label: I.R.S. Records
- Past members: Mitch Easter; Faye Hunter; Sara Romweber; Angie Carlson; Rob Ladd; Eric Marshall; Jon Heames; Suzi Ziegler

Let's Active was an American rock group formed in Winston-Salem, North Carolina, in 1981, and often identified with the jangle pop guitar work of the group's frontman and songwriter Mitch Easter. After disbanding in 1990, the group reformed in August 2014 to play a benefit show in North Carolina.

== History ==
=== Formation (1981–1982) ===
Let's Active was formed in 1981 by Mitch Easter, a guitarist and songwriter best known as a record producer, with Faye Hunter on bass. Drummer Sara Romweber, then 17 years old (a full decade younger than Hunter and Easter), joined to form the original trio two weeks before their first live performance.

The name of the group was taken from a T-shirt sold in Japan bearing an inadvertently nonsensical English phrase (a popular fashion at the time). In a 1984 interview, Hunter said, "It's embarrassing for people to ask you what the name of your group is and you don't want to say it out loud", and noted that the band had been erroneously billed by promoters as "Let's Dance" and "Les Active".

The group played their first performance on November 13, 1981, at the 688 Club in Atlanta, opening for R.E.M., whose first EP, Chronic Town (1982), was produced by Easter. He also co-produced R.E.M.'s first two albums (1983's Murmur and 1984's Reckoning) with Don Dixon.

=== Afoot and Cypress (1983–1984) ===
The band was signed to I.R.S. Records in 1983, shortly after filming the video for "Every Word Means No" as guests on I.R.S. Records Presents: The Cutting Edge, the label's MTV television program. According to Easter, the cheaply made "econo-video" was based on the band's concept of having dogs running through the set, "which would make it chaos. But they couldn't get dogs, so instead they got these puppies, which changed the vibe considerably – and changed the worldview of our band for all eternity, because these puppies were just so adorable".

The original trio of Easter, Hunter and Romweber released the six-song Afoot EP on I.R.S. in 1983. Lynn Blakey, later of Tres Chicas, joined to tour with the group in 1983.

The group released the full-length Cypress in 1984. Romweber quit the band during a UK tour that year. "I was crushed by the fact that the original band couldn't last a little longer," says Easter. “It was kind of like, 'I’ve been working on this my whole life and our band immediately falls apart?'" However, the band was kept alive by Easter, who played as Let's Active with Hunter and two members of The Windbreakers—Jay Peck (drums) and Tim Lee (keyboards)—until a new permanent lineup was established.

=== Big Plans for Everybody and Every Dog Has His Day (1985–1990) ===
In 1985, Easter brought Angie Carlson, previously a rock journalist, into the band to play guitar and keyboards. Carlson's arrival led to Hunter and Easter splitting as a couple. After Hunter's departure, Carlson also took on a role as vocalist, and later married Easter.

The band's second full-length album, Big Plans for Everybody (1986), was largely a solo recording by Easter, who played most of the instruments himself and handled the mixing and production. On board for a few tracks, however, were Carlson, bassist/vocalist Hunter, and drummers Rob Ladd and Eric Marshall. Dennis Ambrose played bass at the beginning of the group's 1986 tour, with the lineup of Easter, Carlson and Marshall. Ambrose was later replaced on bass by Janine Cooper Ayres for the fall leg of the 1986 tour opening for R.E.M.

By the time of Let's Active's third and final album, Every Dog Has His Day (1988), the band's sound had evolved into harder-edged power pop. The album was produced by John Leckie and Easter, and listed a lineup of Easter, Carlson, Marshall and a new member, bassist Jon Heames (credited as "John Heames"). Despite the credits, though, the album was largely recorded by Easter and Marshall, with significant contributions by Carlson. The subsequent tour featured a cohesive lineup of Easter, Carlson, Marshall and Heames.

The band became inactive after a final performance in early 1990. "I thought we were out of steam, so we stopped," said Easter. Around the same time Easter and Carlson broke up.

=== Post-breakup careers (1990–2014) ===
After the dissolution of Let's Active, Carlson went on to form the band Grover in 1993, which released a single and one full-length album, My Wild Life (1995), with Easter producing some of the tracks.

Easter, meanwhile, concentrated on his production career, and rarely performed or recorded his own music in the decades following Let's Active's dissolution. He made a few appearances on tribute albums, performing solo renditions of hits by R.E.M. and The Hollies, and joined Velvet Crush as a touring guitarist for a time in the mid-1990s. In 2000, re-teaming with Marshall, Easter formed the trio Shalini with singer-songwriter and bassist Shalini Chatterjee, who was then Easter's girlfriend (now former wife). Easter wrote some of Shalini's material, but the focus was on Chatterjee, the band's lead vocalist and primary writer. The same three musicians also briefly played under the name the Fiendish Minstrels, which featured Easter's lead vocals as well as a selection of Let's Active tunes in their repertoire. Beginning in the mid-2000s, Easter also resumed recording and performing under his own name. His first—and to date only—official solo album, Dynamico, was released in 2007.

Romweber was a founding member of the band Snatches of Pink. In 2007, she joined her brother, Dexter Romweber of the Flat Duo Jets, to record and perform as the Dex Romweber Duo.

Hunter committed suicide on July 21, 2013, in Advance, North Carolina, at the age of 59.

=== Reunion (2014) ===
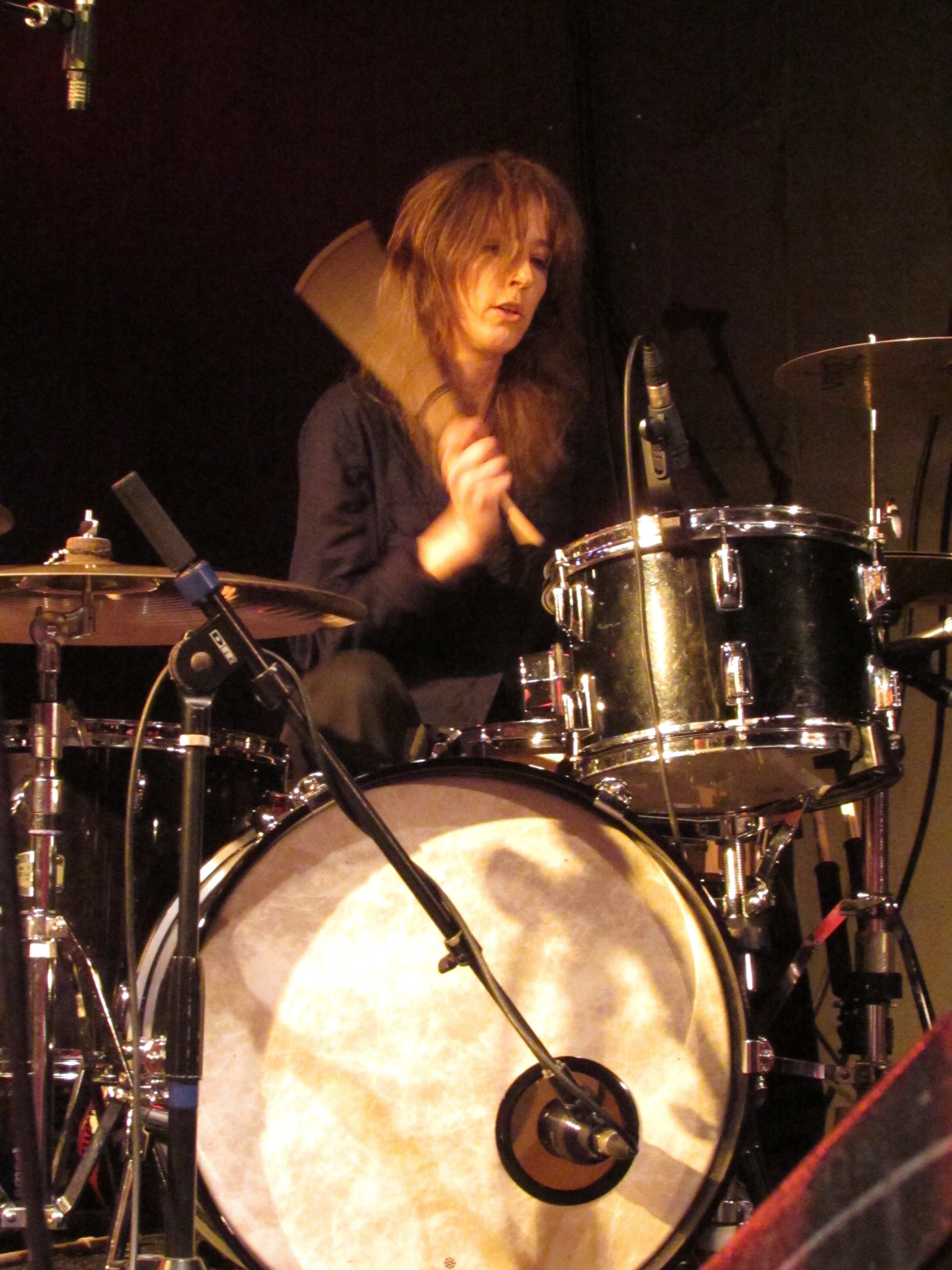
Sara Romweber on drums at Let's Active reunion show

In August 2014, Easter and Sara Romweber reunited Let's Active for a benefit performance for a cancer charity, the Be Loud! Sophie Foundation. Easter invited former Game Theory member Suzi Ziegler to join the group, stepping in to fill Hunter's role as bassist. Easter had previously worked with Ziegler when he produced Game Theory's 1986 album The Big Shot Chronicles. The trio, supported by keyboard player Missy Thangs (of the Love Language) and vocalist Lynn Blakey, performed a set that included "Every Word Means No" and "Edge of the World".

Romweber died of a brain tumor on March 4, 2019, at the age of 55.

== Legacy and critical response ==
Despite critical praise, Let's Active had limited commercial success and initially became known because of Easter's production work with R.E.M., the Bongos and Pylon.

According to Billboard, the 1984 song "Every Word Means No" was a "quintessential gem" of its period, and the early Let's Active was "one of the more intriguing garage pop bands", with "endless hooks and cleverly skewed lyrics".

AllMusic's Mark Deming wrote that the group's recordings established that Easter "deserves to be acknowledged as one of the finer songwriters of his time and place," and "by all rights, should have made him the darling of the college radio (and maybe even the pop charts) with their sharp hooks and insightful lyrics".

Let's Active was the subject of a tribute album, Every Word: A Tribute to Let's Active (2003), which featured 20 cover performances by artists such as Don Dixon, Bill Lloyd, Bobby Sutliff and Tommy Womack.

== Personnel ==
Members

- Mitch Easter – guitar, vocals (1981–1990, 2014)
- Faye Hunter – bass guitar, vocals (1981–1986; died 2013)
- Sara Romweber – drums (1981–1984, 2014; died 2019)
- Angie Carlson – guitar, keyboards, vocals (1985–1990)
- Rob Ladd – drums (1985–1986)
- Eric Marshall – drums (1986–1990)
- Jon Heames – bass guitar (1987–1990)
- Suzi Ziegler – bass guitar (2014)

Touring musicians

- Lynn Blakey – vocals (1983, 2014)
- Tim Lee – keyboards (1984–1985)
- Jay Peck – drums (1984–1985)
- Dennis Ambrose – bass guitar (1986)
- Janine Cooper Ayres – bass guitar (1986–1987)
- Missy Thangs – keyboards (2014)

== Discography ==
=== Albums ===
- Cypress (1984, I.R.S.)
- Big Plans for Everybody (1986, I.R.S.)
- Every Dog Has His Day (1988, I.R.S.)

=== EPs ===
- Afoot (1983, I.R.S.)

=== Singles ===
Year	Title	Chart position	Album
Year	Title	US Modern Rock	Album
1984	"Blue Line"	–	Cypress
1984	"Waters Part"	–	Cypress
1986	"In Little Ways"	–	Big Plans for Everybody
1986	"I Feel Funny"	–	non-album (Bucketfull of Brains magazine flexi)
1988	"Every Dog Has His Day"	17	Every Dog Has His Day

== See also ==
- Athens, GA: Inside Out (1987), archive footage
