= Cat's Cradle (venue) =

Music venue in North Carolina, US

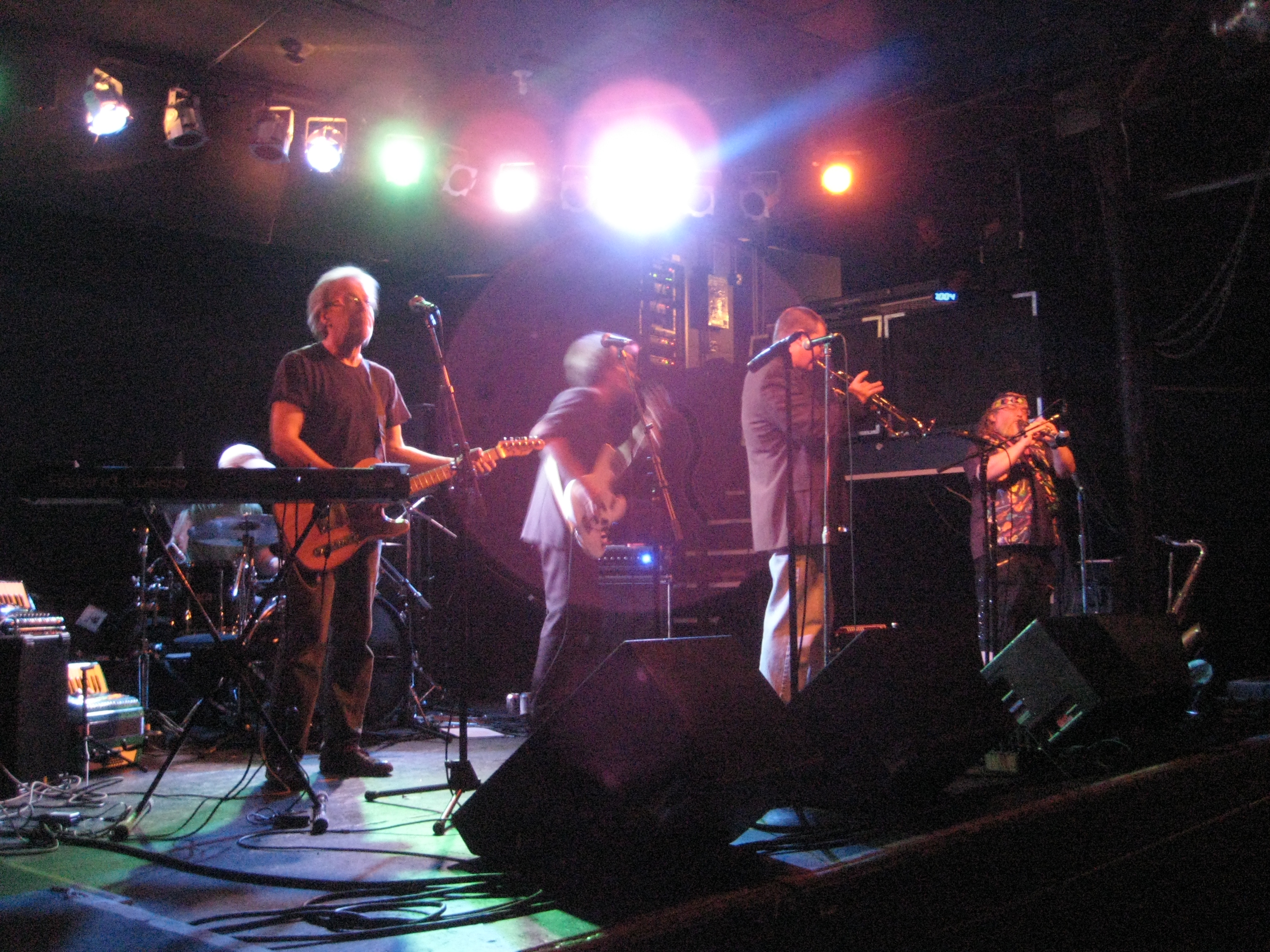
- Brave Combo performing at Cat's Cradle
- Interactive map of Cat's Cradle
- Address: 300 E Main St.
- Location: Carrboro, North Carolina, U.S.
- Coordinates: 35.910094813°N 79.068879907°W
- Capacity: Main room: 750 Back room: 200

Construction
- Opened: 1969 (57 years ago)

Website
- catscradle.com

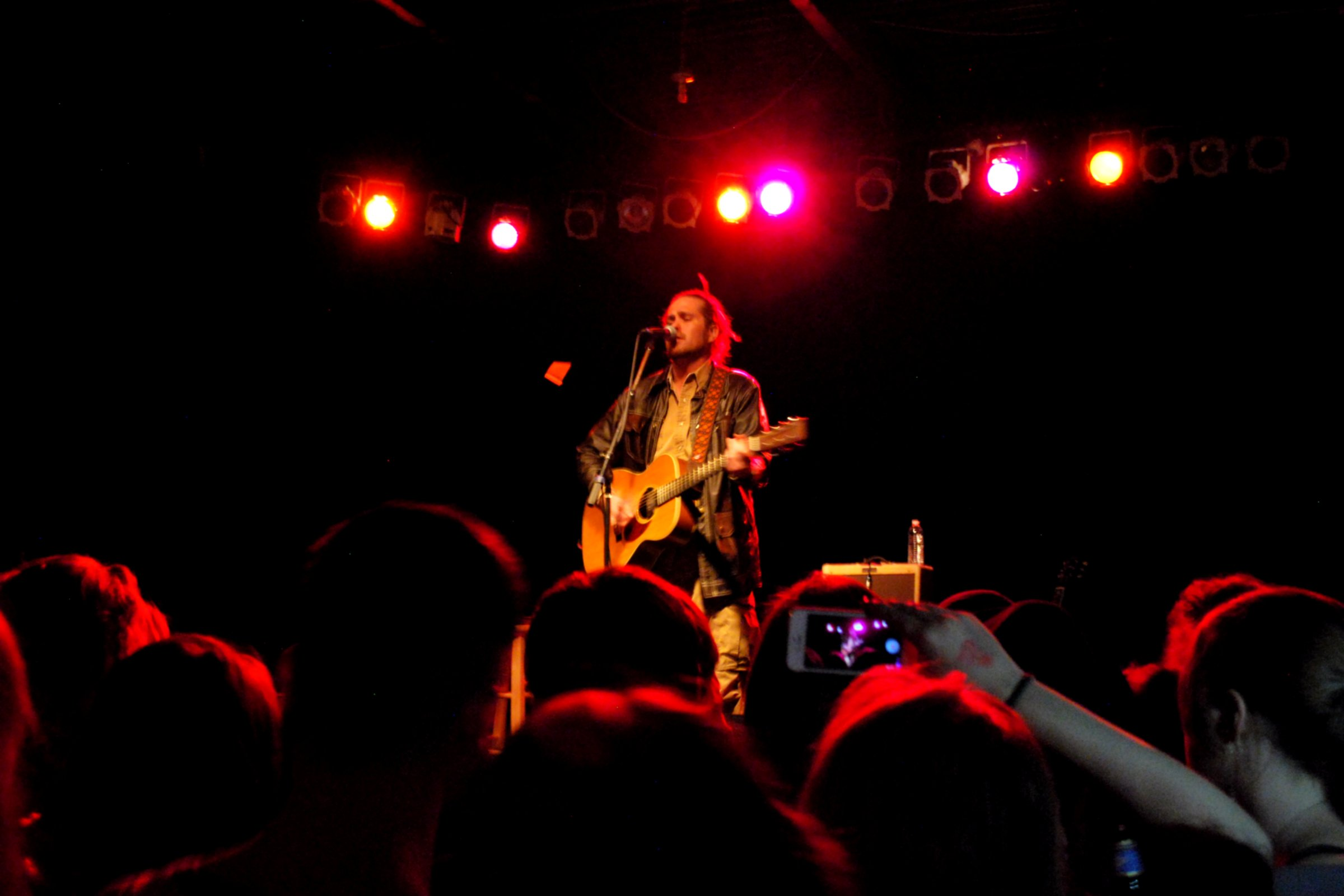
Citizen Cope performing at Cat's Cradle

Cat's Cradle is a music venue and nightclub located in Carrboro, North Carolina, less than a mile from the University of North Carolina campus. It has two rooms with a capacity of 750 and 200 people. In the early 1990s, it contributed to the Chapel Hill region being called the "Next Seattle" by the music press, given that the club hosted upcoming regional and national alternative and grunge acts such as Nirvana (who last performed there just 10 days after the release of Nevermind), Pearl Jam, Sonic Youth, The Smashing Pumpkins, and Ween (who documented their December 9, 1992, performance with At the Cat's Cradle, 1992). In later years, the venue also saw performances by John Mayer, Iggy Pop, Sonic Youth and Joan Baez. In August 2009, The Cosmopolitans played their reunion concert at Cat's Cradle following a 27-year hiatus.

== History ==
The original Cat's Cradle was opened in 1969 by Marcia Wilson and two partners, Mike Cross and Larry Reynolds. Located in a basement about a half mile from the current location, the original venue was significantly smaller, with a capacity of around two dozen people. The club relocated and changed ownership several times, and went bankrupt in 1983 due to unpaid taxes. In 1987 the club was sold to the current owner, Frank Heath. After a six month hiatus in 1993, Cat's Cradle moved to its current location on Main Street. In recent years, an additional yet smaller club next door called Cat’s Cradle Back Room was opened.

In 2020, the club nearly closed its doors due to the COVID-19 pandemic. To cover financial losses, an exclusive album of studio cover songs called Cover Charge was created that featured North Carolina–based artists such as Superchunk, Iron & Wine, The Mountain Goats, Sarah Shook and The Connells. The venue has since reopened.

== Live albums ==
Notable live albums documenting shows at Cat's Cradle include:

- Dillon Fence – Live at the Cat's Cradle (2001)
- Gillian Welch – The Revelator Collection (2002)
- Superchunk – The Clambakes Series Vol. 3 (2004)
- Ween – At the Cat's Cradle, 1992 (2008)
