= Every Dog Has His Day =

Studio album by Let's Active
- Released: 1988
- Label: I.R.S.
- Producer: John Leckie, Mitch Easter

Let's Active chronology
Big Plans for Everybody (1986)	Every Dog Has His Day (1988)

Singles from Every Dog Has His Day
- 1. "Every Dog Has His Day" Released: 1988

Every Dog Has His Day is the third and final studio album by the American band Let's Active, released in 1988. The title track peaked at No. 17 on Billboard's Modern Rock Tracks chart. The band promoted the album by touring with Velvet Elvis.

== Production ==
Recorded in Wales, the album was produced by John Leckie and frontman Mitch Easter. It was mixed at Abbey Road Studios. Determined that the album be more of a band effort, Let's Active also worked to create a heavier sound. New member John Heames played bass on Every Dog Has His Day.

== Critical reception ==
Professional ratings
Review scores
Source	Rating
AllMusic	3/5 stars
The Encyclopedia of Popular Music	3/5 stars
Orlando Sentinel	4/5 stars
The Rolling Stone Album Guide	4/5 stars

Trouser Press wrote that "the best songs ... are classic Easter: unsettled emotional lyrics and eccentric pop melodies that have him straining on vocal tiptoes to reach the hard bits." The Chicago Reader called the album "lush and bountiful and weird: a gorgeous song like 'Horizon' ... has a twangy feedback that turbocharges the backing track."

The Globe and Mail determined that "Easter's heavily layered approach to his sixties psychedelia, punk and pop roots [allow] the band to put all sorts of new twists on old sounds." The Orlando Sentinel stated that "two things dominate from beginning to end—jangling rock 'n' roll guitar and sharp, witty writing." The Omaha World-Herald opined that "Easter's trademark, nasal singing occasionally can be irritating, but that is easily overshadowed by the band's high-energy guitars."

AllMusic wrote that the album "features an overall heavier vibe, with the band rocking like never before, emphasizing a love of hard rock only briefly hinted at on earlier albums, and it's all done very well." The Rolling Stone Album Guide concluded that "muscular drumming and raucous powerchords now augment the jangly guitar of yore."

== Track listing ==
No.	Title	Length
1.	"Every Dog Has His Day"
2.	"Horizon"
3.	"Sweepstakes Winner"
4.	"Orpheus in Hades Lounge"
5.	"Mr. Fool"
6.	"Ten Layers Down"
7.	"Too Bad"
8.	"Night Train"
9.	"Forty Years"
10.	"Bad Machinery"
11.	"I Feel Funny"
12.	"Terminate"
