= The Brewery (music venue) =

American music venue in Raleigh, North Carolina

Coordinates: 35.7895°N 78.6763°W

- Interactive map of The Brewery
- Address: 3009 Hillsborough Street; Raleigh, North Carolina; United States
- Location: Raleigh, North Carolina
- Owner: Kenny Hobby (1983–2004) Tom Taylor (2004–2011)
- Type: music venue
- Seating type: Standing
- Capacity: 300

Construction
- Opened: 1983
- Demolished: August 2011

Website
- brewerync.com

The Brewery was a music venue located on Hillsborough Street in Raleigh, North Carolina. The Brewery was opened in 1983 by Kenny Hobby and later reopened in 2004 by Tom Taylor. The Brewery had long been a stop for up-and-coming touring acts as well as established acts with a somewhat diminished fan base. In 2011 The Brewery officially closed its doors after 28 years and the building was demolished.

== History ==
=== 1980s ===
The Brewery played host to acts such as Jane's Addiction, Korn, Sheryl Crow, Hootie and the Blowfish, Butch Walker and Ryan Adams. In the 1980s The Brewery was pivotal in the hardcore punk movement and was documented in the 2006 Sony Pictures release American Hardcore. During this time, acts such as Corrosion of Conformity and Black Flag took the stage at The Brewery, often during Sunday afternoon matinees. On May 24, 1990 Phish performed at The Brewery and played their new song Horn from their future album Rift for the first time.

=== 1990s ===
In the 1990s the venue became notable as a launching pad for alternative country artists such as The Backsliders, Whiskeytown, and Kenny Roby of Six String Drag. Caitlin Cary of Whiskeytown said in an interview that her band Tres Chicas was formed in the bathroom of The Brewery while she and Tonya Lamm consoled Lynn Blakey over a broken heart.

=== 2000s ===
In the early 2000s the venue seemed to be struggling financially and artistically. In a changing music scene, The Brewery was not able to bring in the rising stars that had made the venue successful in the past, and it eventually closed in early April 2004. A few months later, in June 2004, it was re-opened by Tom Taylor and The Brewery saw a revival, bringing in groups such as 9th Wonder and Annuals. During Taylor's years the venue began bringing in many Pop-punk and Emo pop bands such as Cartel, Paramore, Valencia, All Time Low, and Panic! at the Disco. The venue also became a central venue in the metalcore, post-hardcore, and screamo genres during this time, even becoming a home venue to Alesana, He Is Legend, and other Tragic Hero Records bands.

== Closing and demolition ==
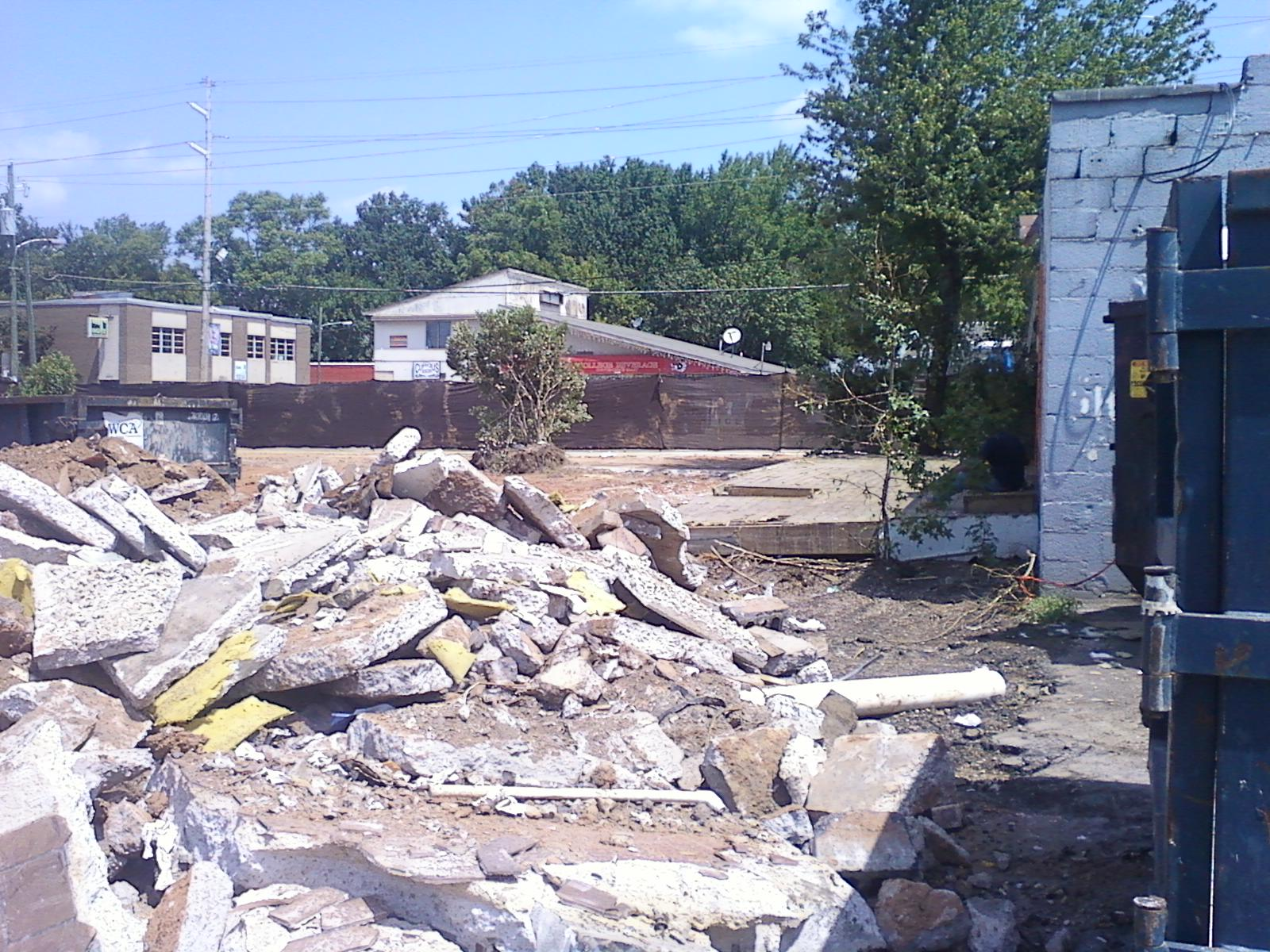
The Brewery a few weeks after being demolished.

In 2011 the plot of land The Brewery stood on was bought by Val Valentine who then gave notice to the venue to vacate as Valentine was not renewing their lease. The Brewery officially closed after its last show on Friday July 29, 2011, even though they had shows booked until November of the same year. Tom Taylor claimed Valentine violated the lease by giving the venue only nine days notice to vacate. Valentine rebutted Taylor's claim by saying that Taylor was given 30 days notice as required by the lease. Taylor said in an interview that Valentine changed the nine days to thirty days after they had already cancelled all their shows. Valentine had been buying the land on the same block as The Brewery for decades and the plot of land The Brewery sat on was the last plot of land on the block which Valentine didn't own. The building was demolished in August 2011.

Valentine teamed up with developer John Kane and in August 2015 they opened Stanhope Student Apartments on the land where The Brewery once stood. The apartment building also houses multiple other businesses including CVS pharmacy, IHOP, and Smoothie King.
