= The Windbreakers =

- Origin: Jackson, Mississippi, U.S.
- Years active: 1981–2000s
- Labels: Homestead; Closer Records; DB; Paisley Pop

The Windbreakers were an American power pop group from Jackson, Mississippi, led by singer-guitarists Tim Lee and Bobby Sutliff. The band released their first EP in 1982, and were best known for an acclaimed 1985 album, Terminal. After three more albums, Lee and Sutliff began solo careers. Tim Lee released All That Stuff in 1997 and, with his wife, Susan Bauer Lee, formed the duo Bark in 2014. Another solo album from Lee, Under the House, was released in 2003.

== Discography ==
- Meet the Windbreakers EP (Big Monkey) 1982
- Any Monkey With a Typewriter EP (Big Monkey) 1983
- Disciples of Agriculture (Fr. Closer) 1985
- Terminal (Homestead) 1985
- Run (DB) 1986
- A Different Sort... (DB) 1987
- At Home with Bobby and Tim (DB) 1989
- Electric Landlady (DB) 1991
- Time Machine (1982–2002)
