= Super Club Retail Entertainment Corporation =

Belgian music and video retail chain

Super Club Retail Entertainment Corporation (Super Club N.A.) was a Belgium-based music and video retail chain. The company was founded in 1986 by Maurits de Prins. At one time owned by Philips, the chain was sold to Blockbuster Entertainment in 1993. The retail chain ultimately closed its stores in 1997.
