= Mitch Easter =

American musician (born 1954)

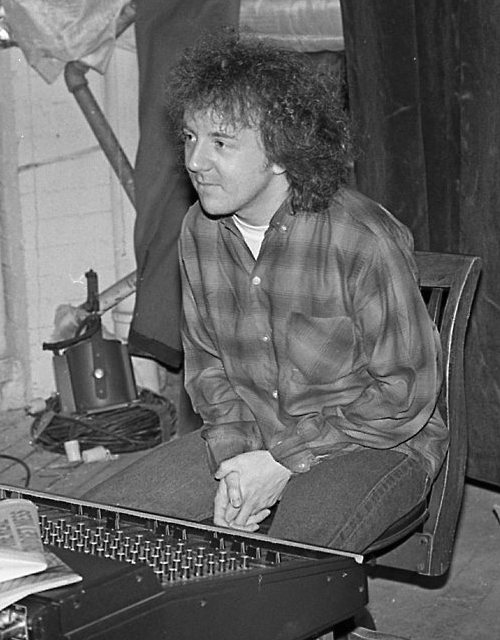
- Easter in 1988

Background information
- Born: Mitchell Blake Easter; November 15, 1954 (age 72); Winston-Salem, North Carolina, U.S.
- Genres: Power pop; jangle pop
- Occupations: Record producer; musician; songwriter
- Instruments: Guitar; vocals
- Years active: 1970–present
- Spouses: Angie Carlson; Shalini Chatterjee (married 2003–2010); Tammy White (married 2018–present)
- Website: Official website (via archive.org)

Mitchell Blake Easter (born November 15, 1954) is an American musician, songwriter and record producer. Frequently associated with the jangle pop style of guitar music, he is known as producer of R.E.M.'s early albums, from 1981 through 1984, and as frontman of the 1980s band Let's Active.

He owns and operates Fidelitorium, a recording studio in Kernersville, North Carolina, which followed on from his Drive-In Studio in Winston-Salem.

== Early life ==
Easter was born in Winston-Salem, North Carolina, the only child of Ken and Elizabeth (Lib), and became deeply involved in music from an early age. His parents loved rock music but, according to Easter, "not all of their friends did." Easter credits their bringing home "Raunchy" by Bill Justis, "which had a guitar solo that completely blew my mind," Easter said in 2019. His friend Doug Muir taught him how to play the riff to "Secret Agent Man," which made Easter think he could actually become a musician. David Downing, a student at Appalachian State University, was his first guitar teacher, while Sam Moss (1953–2007), from Winston-Salem, was his guitar mentor. "He showed me the potential of being a guitar player," said Easter.

Easter attended Richard J. Reynolds High School and went on to the University of North Carolina at Chapel Hill, from 1974 until his graduation in 1978. He played the euphonium in a number of school bands, including the Loyal Opposition, the Imperturbable Teutonic Gryphon and Sacred Irony, some of them with his friend since second grade, Chris Stamey (later of the dB's). It was with Sacred Irony that he began to write original songs. His bandmates were Dale Smith, Corky McMillan, Rick Reich, Ted Lyons and Terry Rosinger.

== Career ==
=== Record production and engineering ===
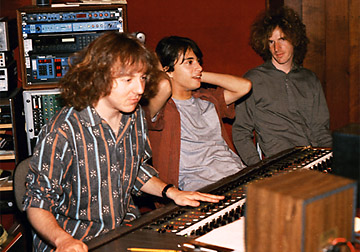
Easter producing Game Theory's Lolita Nation in San Francisco, 1986. L–R: Easter, Michael Quercio, Scott Miller.

Easter became inspired by the studio equipment visible in photographs inside the 1970 Thunderclap Newman album Hollywood Dream, specifically a 3ma track in front of Pete Townshend. "I needed to have that feeling around me," he said in 2025. In 1980, he started Drive-In Studio, a professional recording studio located in what was originally his parents' garage. The first record he worked on, in July 1980, was the Sir Crackers! EP by the short-lived new wave band, the Crackers. (Jay Peck, the band's drummer, played briefly with Let's Active later in the decade.) Another of his early recording sessions was for "Radio Free Europe", the debut single by R.E.M. Drive-In Studio became an integral part of the local indie-rock scene of Winston-Salem, recording a number of bands at low "knock-down" rates. Easter closed the Drive-In Studio in 1994, and moved from Winston-Salem to Kernersville, North Carolina, where he opened his current recording studio, Fidelitorium Recordings, behind his home. Fidelitorium, dubbed "Brick Henge" by Easter, was designed by acoustic architect Wes Lachot.

As a record producer, Easter is probably best known for his work with R.E.M. from 1981 through 1984. Since 1981, he has produced, engineered and often made musical contributions to albums from many other recording artists, including Donna the Buffalo, Mary Prankster, Ex Hex, Ben Folds Five, Pylon, Helium, Pavement, Suzanne Vega, Richard Barone, Game Theory, The Loud Family, Marshall Crenshaw, The Connells, Velvet Crush, Ken Stringfellow (of The Posies) and Birds of Avalon.

Asked in 1999 about his favorite projects as a producer, Easter cited R.E.M.'s Chronic Town and Game Theory's records – Real Nighttime (1984), The Big Shot Chronicles (1985), Lolita Nation (1987) and Two Steps from the Middle Ages (1988) – which Easter called "a lot of fun, because of the variety in the way they approached recording".

=== Performing and songwriting ===
==== Rittenhouse Square and the Sneakers (1970–1981) ====
At the age of 15, in 1970, Easter joined the band Rittenhouse Square, which included friends Chris Stamey, Peter Holsapple and Bobby Locke. Membership in the band changed frequently, except for drummer Locke. The group released an independent album in 1972 but broke up in 1973, after its various members went off to college.

In 1978, Easter joined Stamey's Sneakers, a band that Easter characterized as "pre-punk transitional". Prior to Easter, the Sneakers released a self-titled 7-inch EP (with original guitarist Rob Slater) and one album with Easter replacing Slater, In the Red (1978). When the Sneakers disbanded in the late 1970s, Stamey and bandmate Will Rigby formed the dB's and moved to New York. Easter and Holsapple remained in Chapel Hill and formed the H-Bombs in the fall of 1977. Easter briefly moved to New York City, but returned to Winston-Salem in the summer of 1980.

In January 2006, the Sneakers played a reunion show in New York. In the Red has been reissued on CD by East Side Digital and Collectors' Choice Music, and in September 2015, Omnivore Recordings reissued the Sneakers EP as a CD with five bonus tracks.

==== Let's Active (1981–1990, 2014) ====
In 1981, after a trip to England as soundman for the dB's, which made him realize how much he missed being part of a band, Easter formed Let's Active with then-girlfriend Faye Hunter and drummer Sara Romweber. "That was a magical little trio, while it lasted," said Easter in 2019.

Around the same time, Easter worked with R.E.M. to record their debut single, "Radio Free Europe". This initial work led to a number of collaborations with the band, with Easter producing their debut EP and (with Don Dixon, who he first met in 1970) their first two albums. Let's Active toured with R.E.M., which led to a recording contract with I.R.S. Records. Although Let's Active was not commercially successful, Easter's offbeat style of guitar-based pop music, which came to be known as jangle pop, was considered a major influence on groups such as R.E.M.

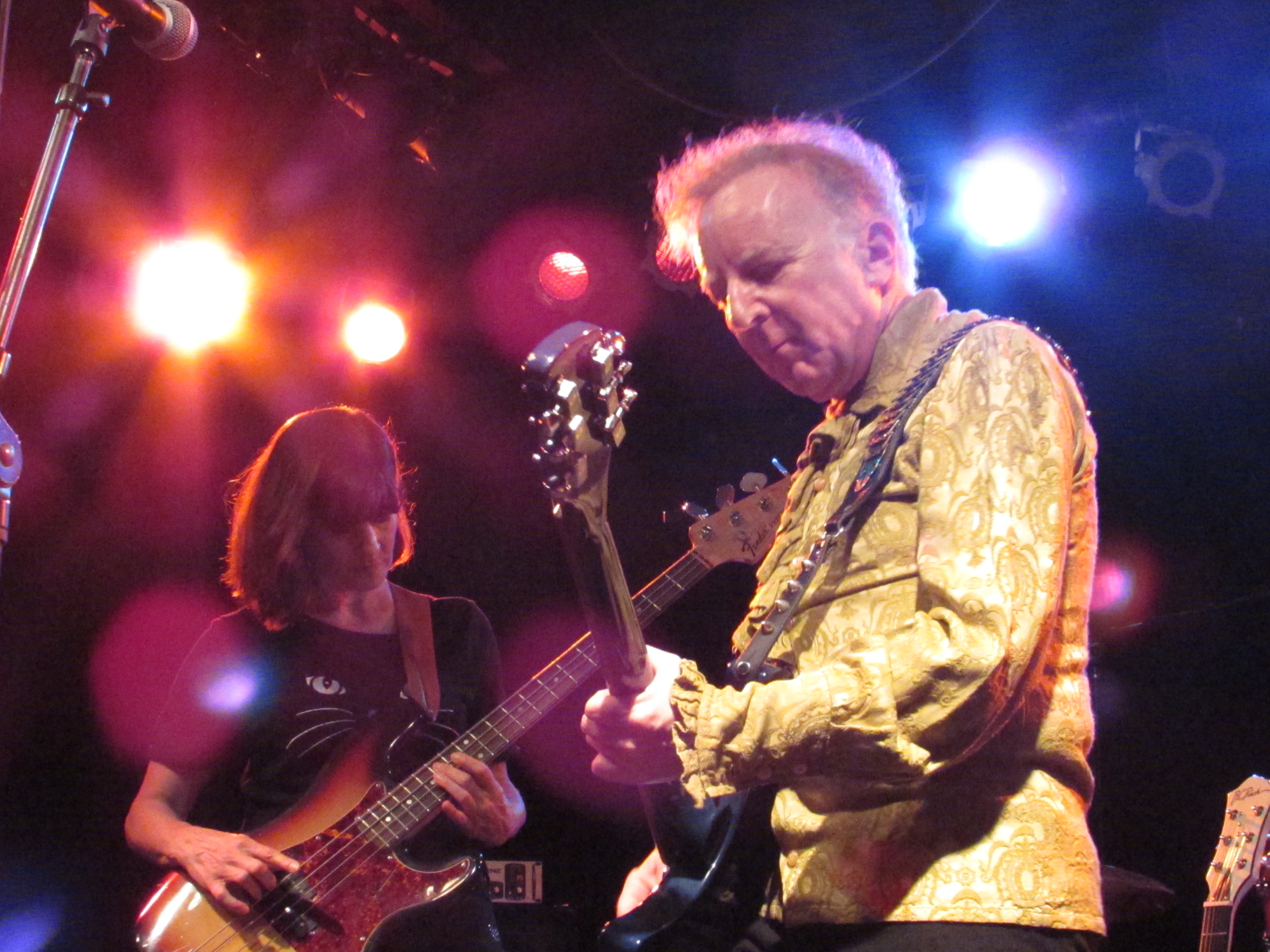
Easter (right), with Suzi Ziegler, in the 2014 reunion of Let's Active

On the I.R.S. label, Let's Active released the EP Afoot (1983), and the albums Cypress (1984), Big Plans for Everybody (1986) and Every Dog Has His Day (1988). A compilation CD, Cypress/Afoot, was released in 1989. After weathering several line-up changes, Let's Active was disbanded by Easter in 1990.

In August 2014, Easter and Sara Romweber reunited Let's Active for a benefit performance, inviting former Game Theory bassist Suzi Ziegler to join the group. Easter had previously worked with Ziegler when he produced Game Theory's 1986 album The Big Shot Chronicles.

==== Shalini and solo projects ====
By 1990, Easter had become known primarily as a producer and engineer. During the 1990s, Easter rarely performed or recorded his own music, although he did join Velvet Crush as a touring guitarist for a time in the mid-1990s.

In 2000, Easter re-teamed with Let's Active member Eric Marshall and Shalini Chatterjee, Easter's then-wife, to form the trio Shalini. The three also briefly played under the name The Fiendish Minstrels, which featured Easter's lead vocals, as well as a selection of Let's Active tunes in its repertoire. With Easter as guitarist for the band Shalini, as well as its producer, Shalini released the albums We Want Jelly Donuts (2000), Metal Corner (2004) and The Surface and the Shine (2007).

Easter released his first solo album, Dynamico, on March 13, 2007. The record was the first on his own imprint, Electric Devil Records, and was initially distributed by 125 Records. Dynamico marked Easter's first work as frontman of a band in the 18 years since he disbanded Let's Active. Easter formed a combo that toured with him in 2007 in support of the album, with the group Shalini as the opening act, to promote Dynamico and Shalini's 2007 album The Surface and the Shine.

Easter dismissed Chatterjee from his band in January 2010, and the two had divorced by 2011. Their "recording relationship" was dissolved prior to the release of Shalini's 2010 album Magnetic North, which was produced by Easter, but on which he did not perform.

==== "Big Star's Third" tour ====
In December 2010, Easter teamed with Chris Stamey, R.E.M. bassist Mike Mills and drummer Jody Stephens of Big Star, along with a string section, to perform a live tribute performance of Big Star's album Third/Sister Lovers in Chapel Hill, North Carolina. Joined by additional performers such as Matthew Sweet, the group performed a similar tribute concert in New York City on March 26, 2011, at the Barbican in London on May 28, 2012, The ongoing project has continued with concerts in Chicago and New York in 2013, a January 2014 concert in Sydney, Australia, and a series of five U.S. shows later in 2014 that included Seattle's Bumbershoot festival and a festival in Athens, Georgia. Performances in 2015 included a September show in Minneapolis and two October dates in San Francisco.

== Later endeavors ==
In 2019, Easter was playing with Balderdash, Ltd., with Chris Garges and Shawn Lynch.

== Recognition ==
In 2019, Easter was inducted into the North Carolina Music Hall of Fame. Prior to giving his acceptance speech, Easter was congratulated, via a video recording, by R.E.M.'s Bill Berry, Mike Mills and Michael Stipe. Among his mentions of gratitude were the coffee houses of the churches in Winston-Salem. "They were magnificent. It was a place that bands could play, and you felt like you were in the rock music business. The kids came out, and it felt like showbusiness."

== Discography ==
=== Solo ===
- 2007: Dynamico (Electric Devil Records)

=== Orange Humble band ===
- 1997: Assorted Creams (Half a Cow)
- 2001: Humblin' (Across America) (Half a Cow)
- 2015: Depressing Beauty (Citadel)

=== Let's Active ===
- 1983: Afoot (I.R.S. Records)
- 1984: Cypress (I.R.S.)
- 1986: Big Plans for Everybody (I.R.S.)
- 1988: Every Dog Has His Day (I.R.S.)

=== As producer (selected) ===
- 1982: R.E.M. – Chronic Town (I.R.S. Records) with R.E.M.
- 1983: R.E.M. – Murmur (I.R.S. Records) with Don Dixon
- 1983: Richard Barone and James Mastro – Nuts And Bolts (Passport) with James Mastro and Richard Barone
- 1983: X-Teens – X-Teens (Dolphin)
- 1984: R.E.M. – Reckoning (I.R.S. Records) with Don Dixon
- 1985: Game Theory – Real Nighttime (Enigma)
- 1986: Game Theory – The Big Shot Chronicles (Enigma)
- 1986: Waxing Poetics – Hermitage (Emergo) with Mike Mills
- 1987: Game Theory – Lolita Nation (Enigma)
- 1987: The Connells – Boylan Heights (TVT)
- 1987: Bobby Sutliff – Only Ghosts Remain (PVC)
- 1987: Hyaa! – Get Yer Hyaa-Hyaa`s Out! (no label)
- 1987: Washington Squares – The Washington Squares (Gold Castle)
- 1987: Hege V - House of Tears
- 1988: Velvet Elvis – Velvet Elvis (Enigma) with Tom Laune
- 1988: Even the Odd – self titled (Wanga)
- 1988: Mambo-X – Whirled (Wanga records)
- 1988: Love Tractor – Themes from Venus (DB)
- 1989: The Hummingbirds – loveBUZZ (RooArt)
- 1990: Lava Love – Whole Lava Love (Sky)
- 1992: Moose – ...XYZ
- 1993: Two Pound Planet – Songs From The Hydrogen Jukebox (Alternative)
- 1994: Motocaster – Stay Loaded (Interscope)
- 1994: The Loud Family – The Tape of Only Linda (Alias)
- 1994: Velvet Crush – Teenage Symphonies to God (Creation / Sony)
- 1995: Grover – My Wild Life (Zero Hour)
- 1996: The Drag – Satellites Beaming Back At You (Island Records)
- 1996: DM3 – Road To Rome (Citadel) with DM3
- 1997: Pavement – Brighten the Corners (Matador Records)
- 1997: Helium – The Magic City (Matador Records) with Helium
- 2001: Velvet Crush – A Single Odessey (Action Musik)
- 2002: Coronet Blue – Coronet Blue (Laughing Outlaw)
- 2002: d Henry Fenton – Autumn Sweet (Laughing Outlaw)
- 2002: Glory Fountain – The Beauty of 23 (Undertow)
- 2003: Mary Prankster – Tell Your Friends (Palace Coup / Orchard)
- 2004: Tim Lee – No Discretion (Paisley Pop)
- 2004: Shalini – Metal Corner (Dalloway)
- 2005: The Mockers – The Lonesome Death of Electric Campfire (Zebra)
- 2005: Jeffrey Dean Foster – Million Star Hotel (Angel Skull)
- 2006: Honor by August – Drowning out the Television (Low Watt)
- 2006: Velvet – The Juggernaut (Double Decker Bus)
- 2007: Angel and the Love Mongers – The Humanist Queen (Rock Snob)
- 2008: Baskervilles – Twilight (Secret Crush)
- 2008: Spank – Get Bent (self-released)
- 2009: Western Civ – Shower the People You Love with Gold (Nomorefakelabels)
- 2011: Birds of Avalon – Birds of Avalon (Gigantic / Bladen County)
- 2011: Big Troubles – Romantic Comedy (Slumberland)
- 2012: A Fragile Tomorrow – Be Nice Be Careful (Piewillie)
- 2015: The Old Ceremony – Sprinter (Yep Roc)
- 2016: Waiting for Henry – "Town Called Patience" (Mighty Hudson Music)

=== As contributing musician ===
- 1983: The Accelerators – Leave My Heart (Dolphin)
- 1985: Marshall Crenshaw – Downtown (Warner Bros.)
- 1985: Marti Jones – Unsophisticated Time (A&M)
- 1986: Marti Jones – Match Game (A&M)
- 1987: Chris Stamey – It's Alright (A&M)
- 1987: Don Dixon – Romeo At Juilliard (Enigma Records)
- 1987: Marshall Crenshaw – Mary Jean & 9 Others (Warner Bros.)
- 1995: The 6ths – Wasps' Nests (Factory)
- 1995: Stephen Duffy – Duffy (Indolent)
- 1998: Steve Almaas - Human All Too Human (Lonesome Whippoorwill Sweden)
- 2000: Steve Almaas - Kingo A Wild One (Parasol Records USA / Lonesome Whippoorwill Sweden)
- 2001: Alejandro Escovedo – A Man Under the Influence (Bloodshot)
- 2002: Caitlin Cary – While You Weren't Looking (Yep Roc)
- 2002: Gerty – Sweets From the Minibar (Eskimo Kiss)
- 2003: Madison Smartt Bell – Forty Words For Fear (Gaff Music)
- 2003: Thad Cockrell – Warmth & Beauty (Yep Roc)
- 2006: Drive-By Truckers – A Blessing and a Curse (New West)
- 2006: Little Diesel – No Lie (Telstar)
- 2006: Steve Almaas – You Showed Me (Parasol)
- 2011: The Parson Red Heads – Yearling (Second Motion)
- 2012: The dB's – Falling Off the Sky (BarNone)
- 2012: Steve Almaas - Trailer Songs (Lonesome Whippoorwill Sweden)
- 2013: Chris Stamey – Lovesick Blues (Yep Roc)
- 2013: Polvo – Siberia (Merge)
- 2014: Dwight Twilley – Always (Big Oak)
- 2014: Karen Haglof – Western Holiday (self-released)
- 2015: Chris Stamey – Euphoria (Yep Roc)
- 2021: Steve Almaas - Everywhere You've Been (Lonesome Whippoorwill Sweden)

== Personal life ==
Easter's mother, Lib, was credited with "party crowd vocals" on The Cosmopolitans' 1980 single "(How To Keep Your) Husband Happy". She died in 2002. Easter's father, Ken, followed five years later, aged 76.

Easter has been married three times, firstly to Angie Carlson, who had joined Let's Active. The divorced around 1995. From 2003 to 2010, Easter was married to Shalini Chatterjee. He married Tammy White in 2018.
