= Drive-In Studio =

Recording studio in Winston-Salem, North Carolina

Coordinates: 36.136778°N 80.174154°W

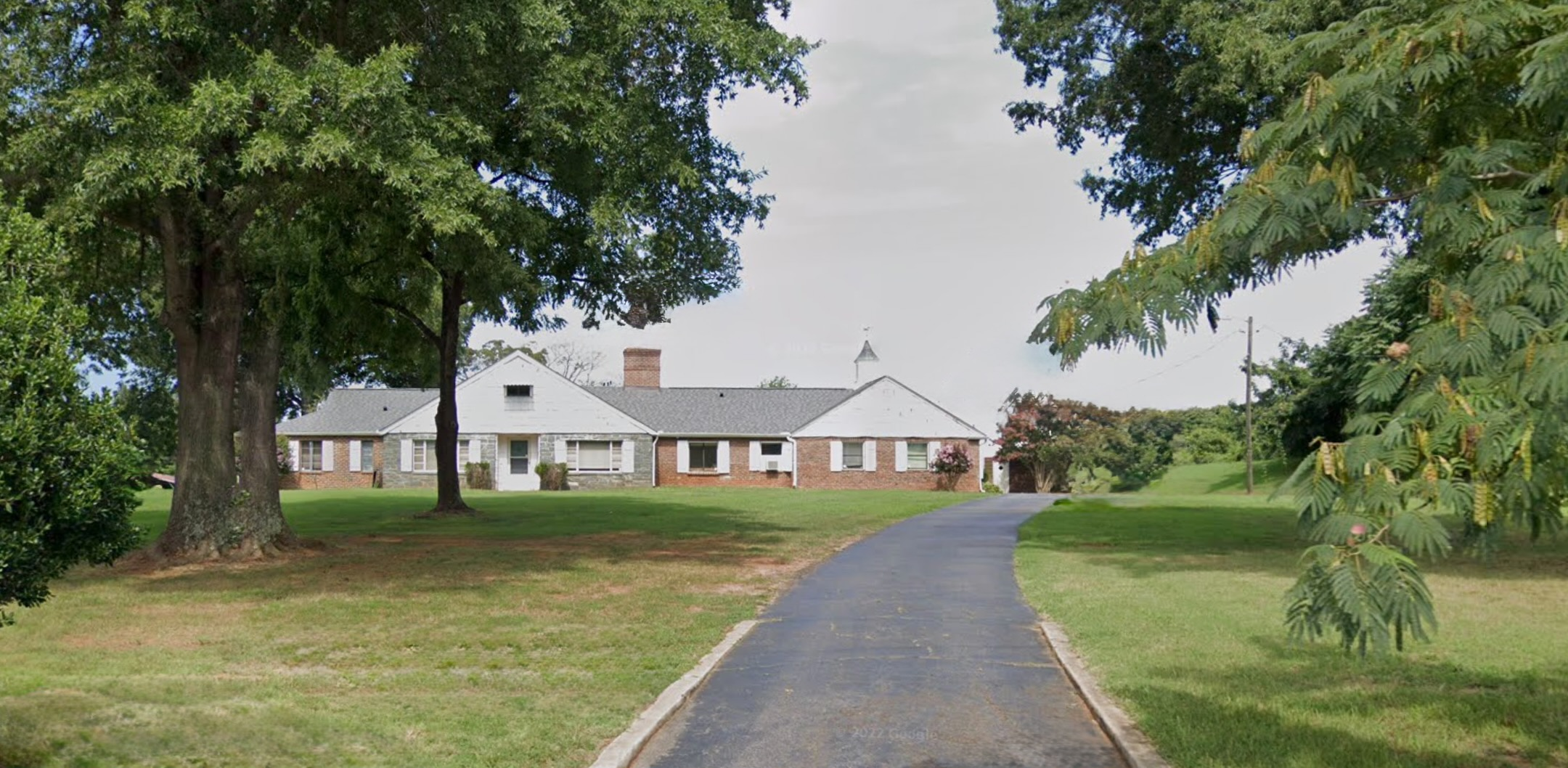
- Pictured in 2023
- Type: Recording studio
- Industry: Music
- Founded: July 1980
- Founder: Mitch Easter
- Defunct: 1994
- Fate: Closed due to relocation
- Headquarters: Winston-Salem, North Carolina, U.S.

Drive-In Studio was a recording studio in rural Winston-Salem, North Carolina, founded by Mitch Easter in July 1980. R.E.M.'s debut single, "Radio Free Europe" (1981), and their first extended play, Chronic Town (1982), were recorded at the studio six months apart in 1981. The studio was established in what was initially Easter's parents' garage of their 1949-built home at 4527 Old Belews Creek Road, and became an important part of the early indie rock scene of North Carolina.

"After a while, I thought, '[Working out of a garage] is kind of embarrassing, but bands didn't really seem to care," Easter said in 2025. At the time of R.E.M.'s stint at the studio, "the set-up was really simple," Easter said in 1994. "I had almost nothing in the studio back then, except a tape machine and a console and two compressors and one delay device. We couldn't do any fancy stuff."

Easter explained the studio's layout to Music Radar in 2021:

[The studio] was tiny. The entire space was probably about 225 square feet. It was a two-car garage that had been divided up before my parents got the place. The previous owners split it up and turned it into a one-car garage, and then the other half they made into a children’s bedroom and this sort of utility room. The car area was where the band stood together, the children’s bedroom was the control room, and I think the bass and guitar amps were isolated in the little utility area next to the control room.

Due to the confined space of the interior, studio sessions often also took place in the home's driveway, under the carport.

Let's Active recorded the video for "Waters Part", from their 1984 album Cypress, in the Drive-In's studio.

The home backed up onto farmland, and when Easter's parents lived there it had cows grazing on it. Easter recalls walking behind the house with Let's Active band mate and girlfriend Faye Hunter. "She just started sort of singing to the cows, who were like 100 feet away," Easter said in 2013, shortly after Hunter's suicide. "And they just came to her. And I don't think cows normally do that, you know? But they came to her because they knew that she was trying to send them love. And it was really touching and she did something like that every day with animals."

== Equipment ==
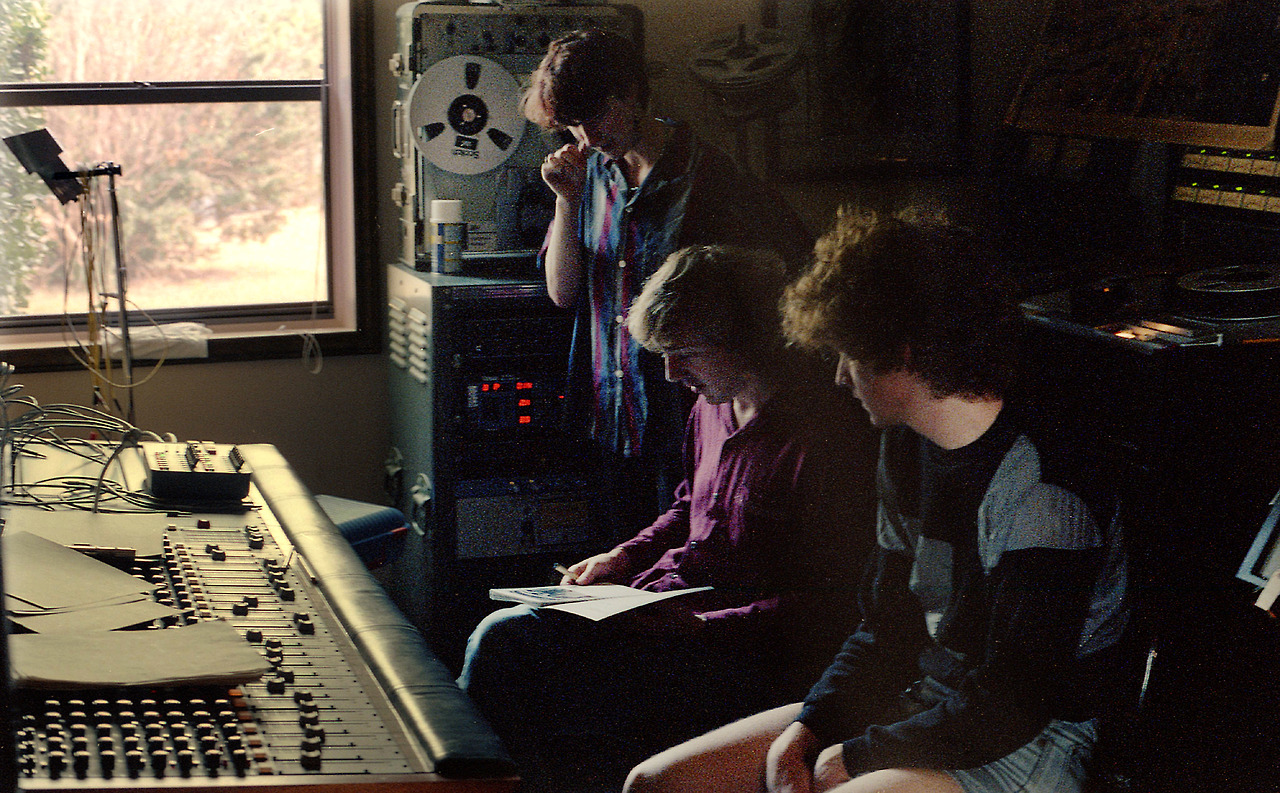
Shelley LaFreniere, Mitch Easter and Scott Miller recording Game Theory's album The Big Shot Chronicles at Drive-In Studio, September 1985

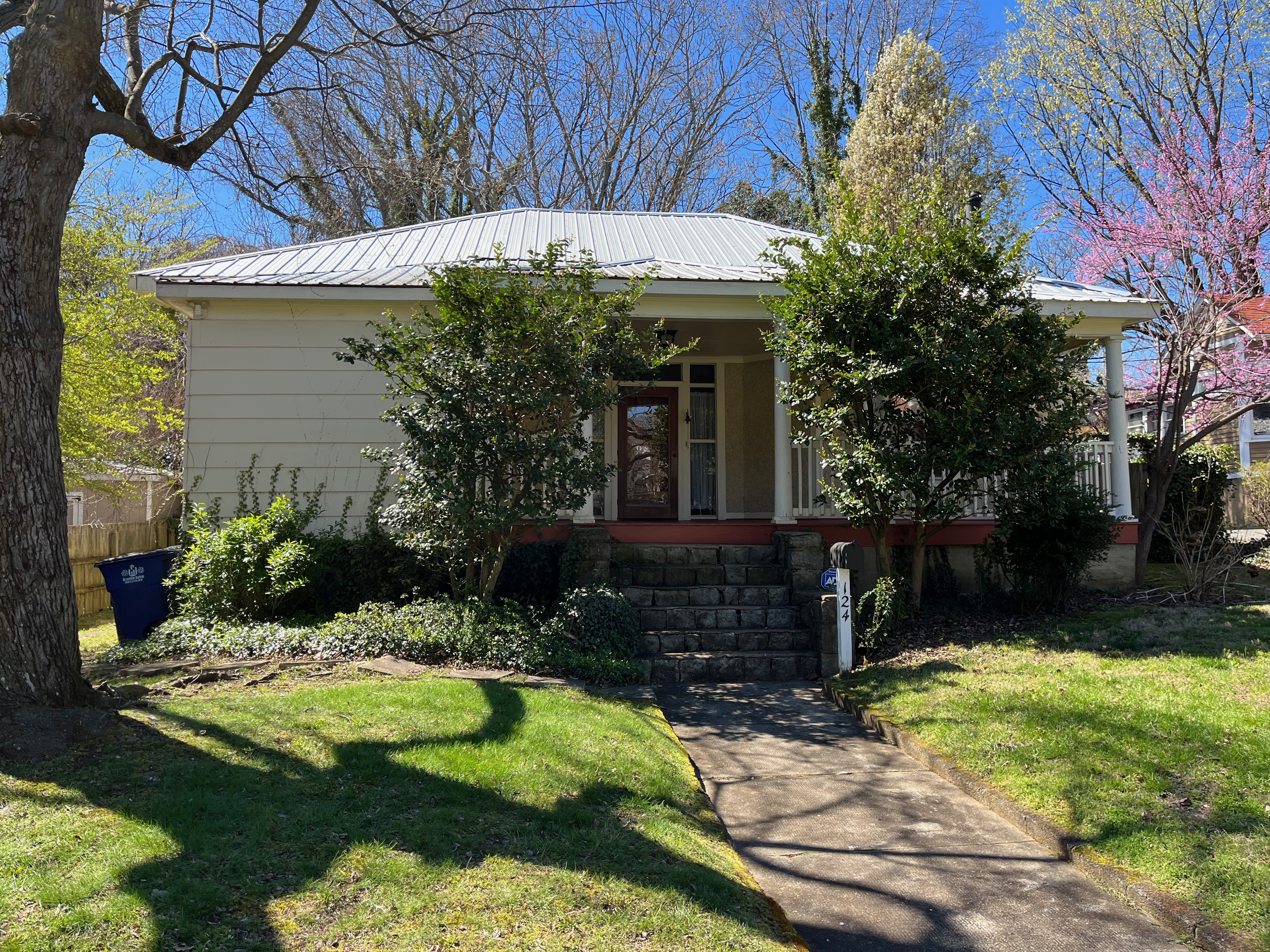
124 Shady Boulevard in Winston-Salem

An early advertisement, which listed 124 Shady Boulevard, then home to Faye Hunter's parents, Dallas and Rachel, as a mailing address for the studio, itemized its recording technology:

- Quantum 20-input mixing console
- 3M M56 sixteen- and two-track recorders
- Lexicon Prime Time M93 digital delay
- Allison Gain Brain limiters
- AKG, Shure and Electro-Voice mics
- Electric and acoustic reverb
- TEAC four-track
- Cassette
- Drums
- Organ
- Electric piano
- Amps
- Toys

At his induction into the North Carolina Music Hall of Fame in 2019, Easter thanked "the TEAC Corporation for making the 2340 four-track tape machine, because that's where Chris Stamey and I made these unlistenable tapes that led to our careers in recording."

== Artists ==
Other artists who recorded at Drive-In include Pylon ("Beep"), Suzanne Vega ("Gypsy"), Game Theory (The Big Shot Chronicles) and The Connells (Boylan Heights).

Easter closed Drive-In in 1994, and moved to Kernersville, North Carolina, where he opened his current recording studio, Fidelitorium Recordings.
