= List of Gang of Four band members =

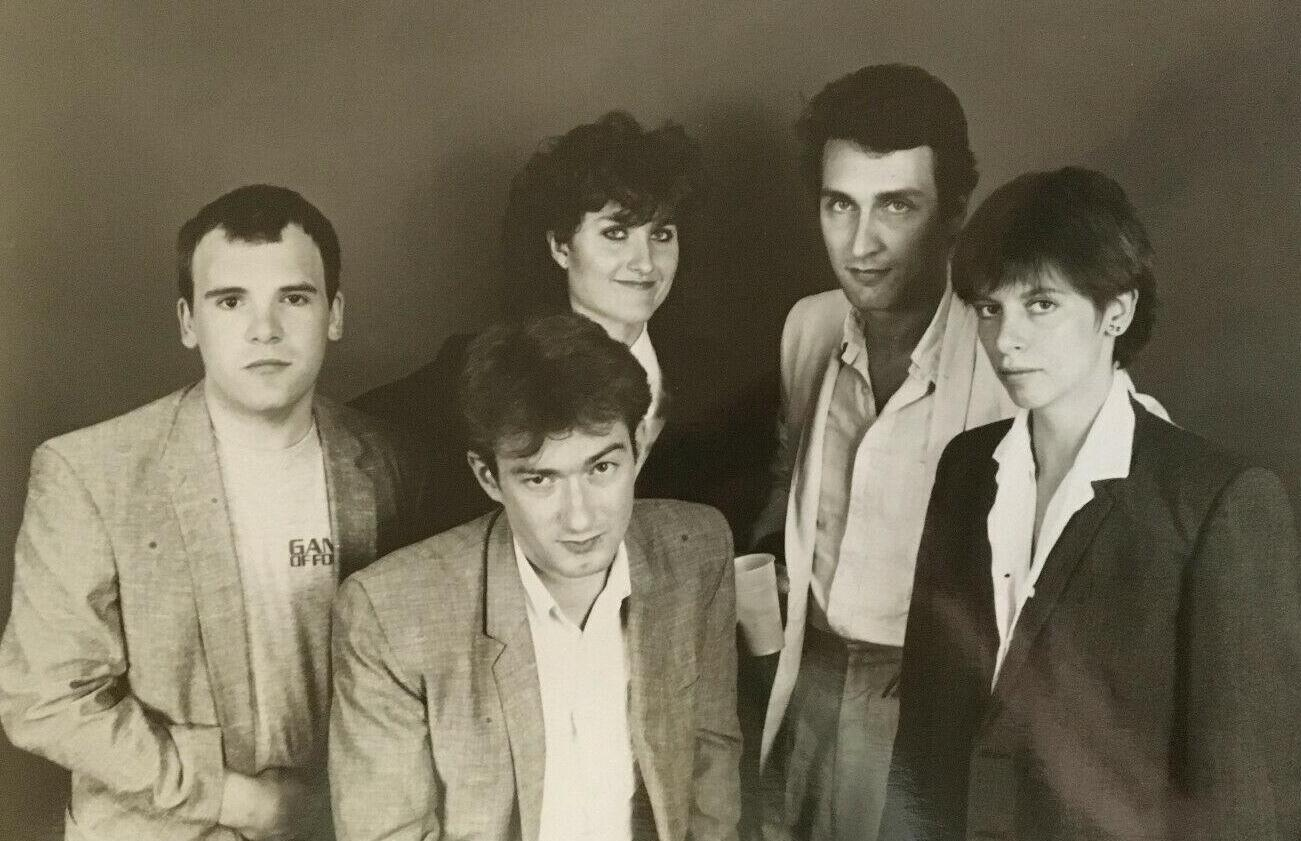
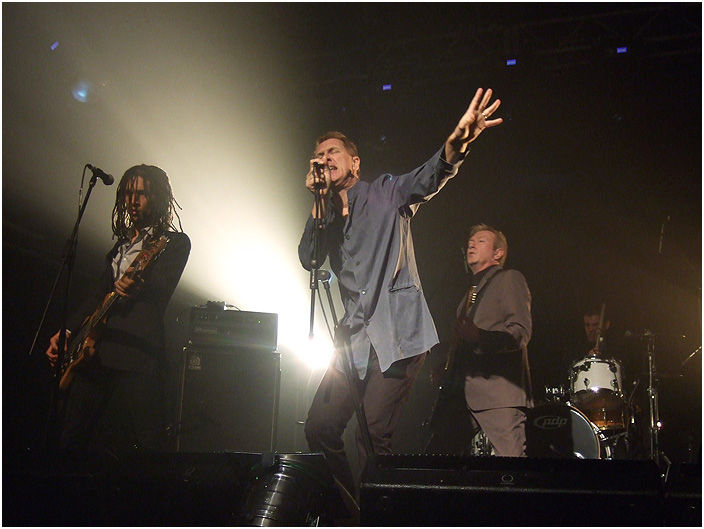
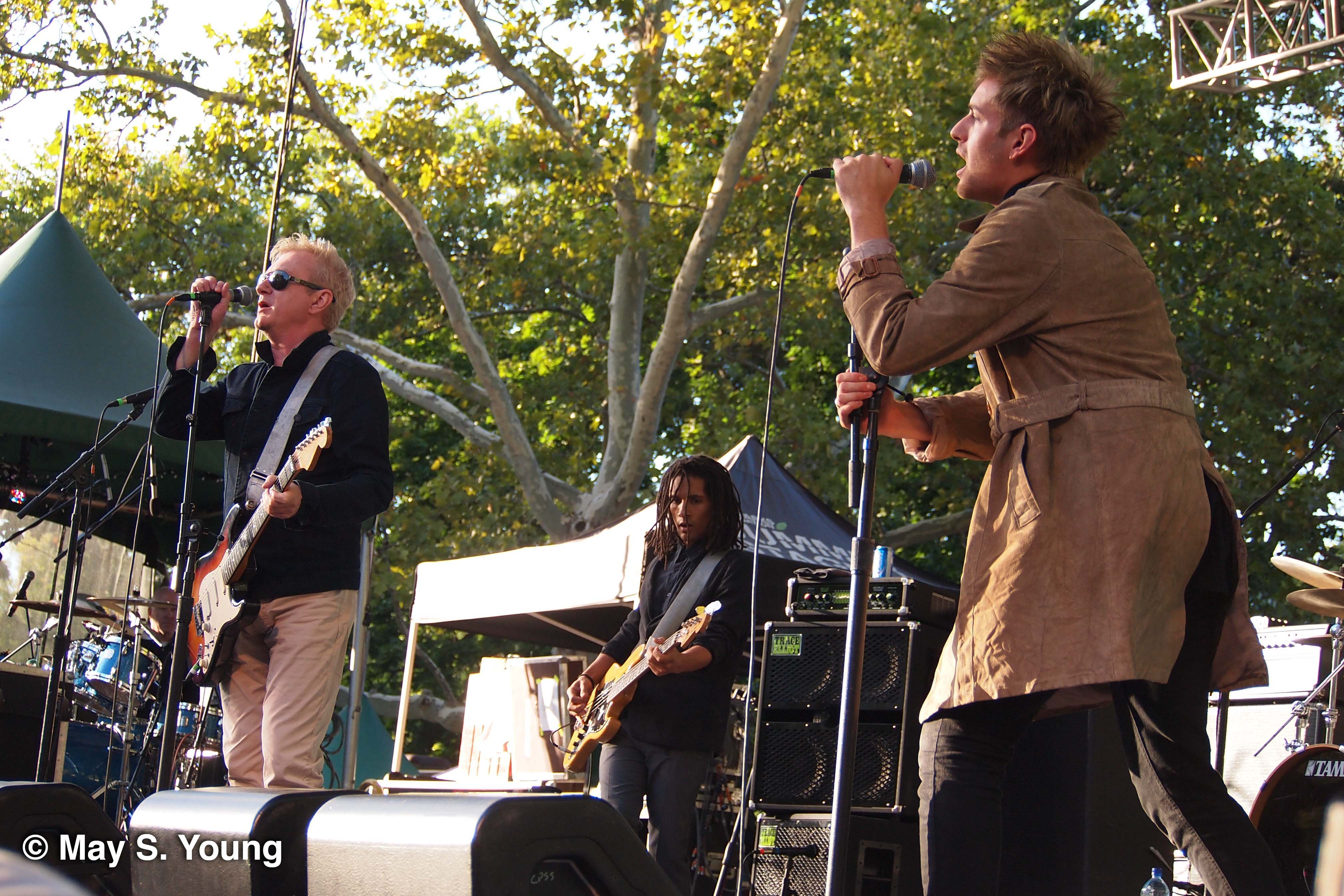
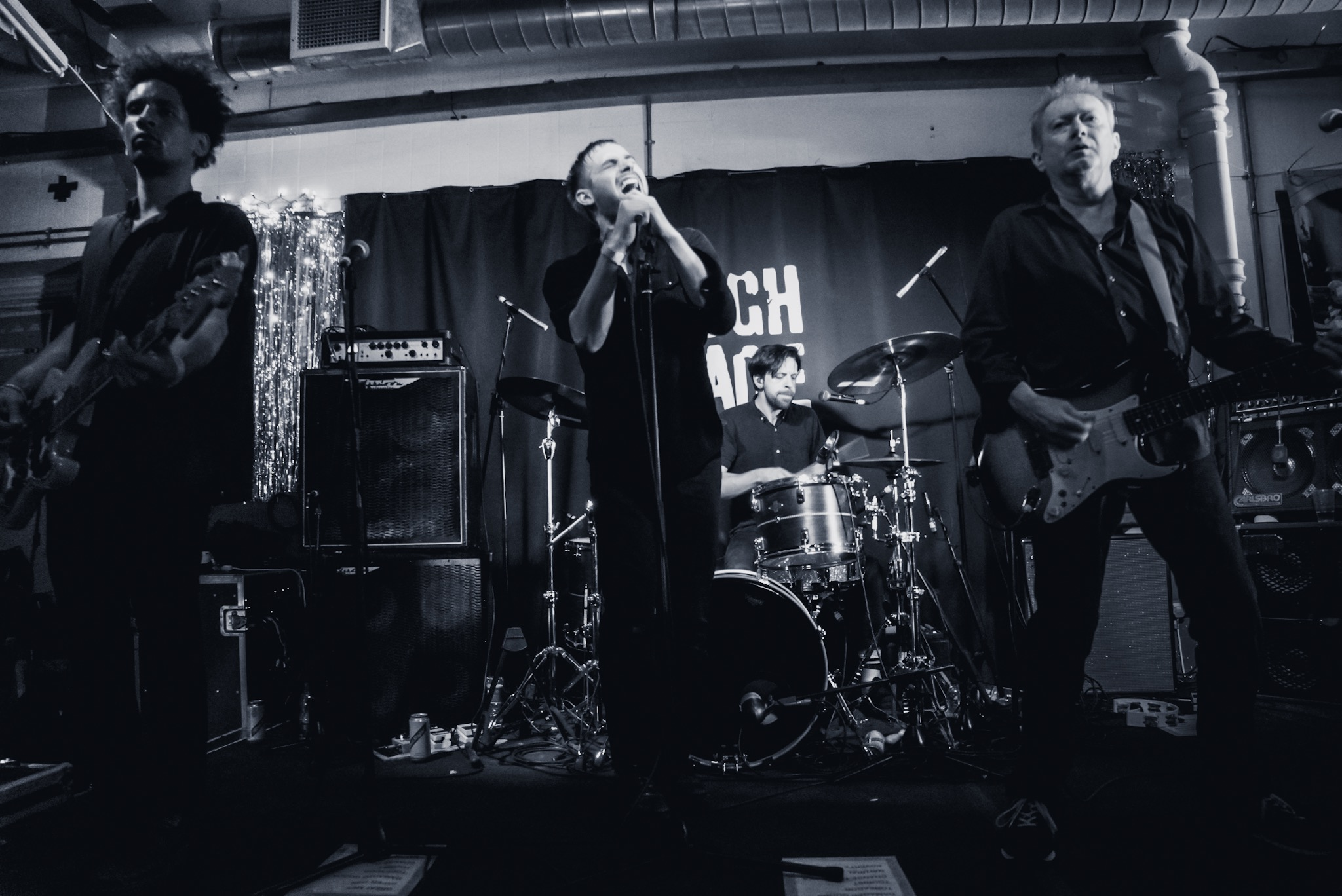
Gang of Four in 1982, 2011, 2015, 2019

Gang of Four are an English post-punk band founded by guitarist Andy Gill and singer Jon King in 1976, the band originally consisted King, Gill, drummer Hugo Burnham and bassist Dave Wolfson, who was soon replaced by Dave Allen. The band's most recent personnel included King (who was a consistent member, except for between 2012 and 2021) and Burnham (who most recently rejoined in 2021), bassist Gail Greenwood (since 2024) and guitarist Ted Leo (since 2025).

== History ==
King and Gill founded the band in 1976 in Leeds, the two were joined by drummer Hugo Burnham and bass guitarist Dave Wolfson. After two or three gigs, Wolfson was replaced by Dave Allen. After releasing two albums, Allen left in 1981. He was temporarily replaced by Busta "Cherry" Jones, before Sara Lee joined as a permanent replacement. Burnham left in 1983, his replacement was Steve Goulding. The band broke up in 1984.

King and Gill reunited Gang of Four on three occasions in the 1990s, first to record Mail (1991), which featured Gail Ann Dorsey on bass and drummers Blair Cunningham, Frank Tontoh, Martyn Ford, Neil Wilkinson, Steve Monti. And again in 1995, recording Shrinkwrapped with bassists Phil Butcher and Dean Garcia, and drummers Dave Axford and again Steve Monti.

In 2004, the classic line-up of King, Gill, Burnham and Allen reunited for a UK tour in 2005. Burnham departed again in late 2005 to continue to be a college professor, he was replaced by Mark Heaney. Allen was also replaced by Thomas McNeice in 2008. Founding member Jon King left in 2011 after disagreements with Gill, he was replaced by John Sterry. Heaney was also replaced by Jonny Finnegan in 2014, who was replaced by Tobias Humble in 2016. Gill died in February 2020, ending this incarnation of the band.

In October 2021, King reformed the band with Burnham, former bassist Sara Lee and Slint guitarist Dave Pajo. Allen did not return as "he didn’t want to do anything any more". Lee was replaced by Linda Pardee in January 2024, and then by Gail Greenwood in July 2024. David Pajo was replaced by Ted Leo in January 2025. On 6 July 2025, the band played their final show. But wait -- it wasn't. Three out of the four members (Greenwood, Leo and Burnham) were at Boston Globe music writer James Sullivan's "Which Side" monthly series on June 24, 2026 at the Burren in Davis Square, Somerville and played a couple of Go4 songs. Then with King in great form, they did a full set at the Solid Sound Festival at MassMoCA on June 26.

== Members ==
=== Current members ===
| Image | Name | Years active | Instruments | Release contributions |
|---|---|---|---|---|
| | Jon King | 1976–1984; 1990–1991; 1993; 1995; 2004–2011; 2021–2025 | lead vocals; percussion; melodica | all releases until Content (2011) |
| | Hugo Burnham | 1976–1982; 2004–2006; 2021–2025 | drums; backing vocals | all releases from Entertainment! (1979) to Songs of the Free (1982); The Peel Sessions (1990); Entertainment!: Official Live Recording (2005) |
| | Gail Greenwood | 2024–2025 | bass; backing vocals | none to date |
| | Ted Leo | 2025 | guitar; vocals | none to date |

=== Former members ===
| Image | Name | Years active | Instruments | Release contributions |
|---|---|---|---|---|
| | Andy Gill | 1976–1984; 1990–1991; 1993; 1995; 2004–2020 (until his death) | guitar; vocals | all releases to date |
| | Dave Wolfson | 1976 | bass; backing vocals | none |
| | Dave Allen | 1977–1981; 2004–2008; (died 2025) | bass; backing vocals | all releases from Entertainment! (1979) to Another Day/Another Dollar (1982); The Peel Sessions (1990); Return the Gift (2005); Entertainment!: Official Live Recording (2005) |
| | Busta "Cherry" Jones | 1980 (died 1995) | bass; backing vocals | none |
| | Sara Lee | 1980–1984; 2021–2023 | bass; backing vocals | Songs of the Free (1982); Hard (1983) |
| | Steve Goulding | 1983–1984 | drums; backing vocals | none |
| | Gail Ann Dorsey | 1990–1991 | bass; backing vocals | Mall (1991); What Happens Next (2015) guest vocals on one track |
| | Mark Heaney | 2005–2013 | drums; backing vocals | Return the Gift (2005); Content (2011); What Happens Next (2015) |
| | Thomas McNeice | 2008–2020 | bass; backing vocals | all releases from Content (2011) to Happy Now (2019) |
| | John "Gaoler" Sterry | 2012–2020 | lead vocals; percussion; melodica | What Happens Next (2015) |
| | Jonny Finnegan | 2014–2016 | drums; backing vocals | What Happens Next (2015) |
| | Tobias Humble | 2016–2020 | drums; backing vocals | Happy Now (2019) |
| | David Pajo | 2021–2024 | guitar; vocals | none |
| | Linda Pardee | 2023–2024 (died 2026) | bass; backing vocals | none |
