= Gang of Four discography =

- Studio albums: 10
- EPs: 8
- Live albums: 3
- Compilation albums: 4
- Singles: 28

This is the discography of English post-punk band Gang of Four.

== Albums ==
=== Studio albums ===
Title	Album details	Peak chart positions				
Title	Album details	UK	UK Ind.	NZ	US	US Ind.
Entertainment!	Released: September 1979; Label: EMI, Warner Bros.; Formats: LP, MC	45	—	35	—	—
Solid Gold	Released: March 1981; Label: EMI, Warner Bros.; Formats: LP, MC	52	—	47	190	—
Songs of the Free	Released: May 1982; Label: EMI, Warner Bros.; Formats: LP, MC	61	—	—	175	—
Hard	Released: September 1983; Label: EMI, Warner Bros.; Formats: LP, MC	—	—	—	168	—
Mall	Released: May 1991; Label: Polydor; Formats: CD, LP, MC	—	—	—	—	—
Shrinkwrapped	Released: September 1995; Label: Castle; Formats: CD, MC	—	—	—	—	—
Return the Gift	Released: October 2005; Label: V2; Formats: 2xCD	—	21	—	—	—
Content	Released: 24 January 2011; Label: Grönland, Yep Roc; Formats: CD, LP, digital download	—	15	—	—	34
What Happens Next	Released: 24 February 2015; Label: Metropolis, Membran; Formats: CD, LP, digital download	—	—	—	—	—
Happy Now	Released: 19 April 2019; Label: Gill Music; Formats: CD, LP, digital download	—	21	—	—	—
"—" denotes releases that did not chart or were not released in that territory.

=== Live albums ===
Title	Album details
At the Palace	Released: 16 November 1984; Label: Mercury; Formats: LP, MC
Entertainment!: Official Live Recording	Released: September 2005; Label: Concert Live; Formats: 2xCD
Live... In the Moment	Released: 2 September 2016; Label: Gill Music, Metropolis; Formats: CD, CD+DVD, 2xLP

=== Compilation albums ===
Title	Album details
The Peel Sessions	Released: May 1990; Label: Strange Fruit; Formats: CD, LP, MC
A Brief History of the Twentieth Century	Released: November 1990; Label: EMI, Warner Bros.; Formats: CD, LP, MC
100 Flowers Bloom	Released: November 1998; Label: Rhino; Formats: 2xCD
Gang of Four 77–81	Released: 5 March 2021; Label: Matador; Formats: 4xCD+digital download, 5xLP+MC

== EPs ==
Title	EP details	Peak chart positions	
Title	EP details	UK	UK Ind.
Yellow	Released: October 1980; Label: Warner Bros.; Formats: 12"; US and Canada-only release	—	—
Another Day/Another Dollar	Released: 19 January 1982; Label: Warner Bros.; Formats: 12"; US and Canada-only release	—	—
The Peel Sessions	Released: October 1986; Label: Strange Fruit; Formats: 12", MC	181	21
To Hell with Poverty (The Loaded Remix EP)	Released: January 1991; Label: EMI; Formats: 7", 12", CDS	100	—
Die Staubkorn Sammlung	Released: 7 August 2015; Label: Membran; Formats: digital download; Credited as Herbert Grönemeyer + Gang of Four	—	—
Complicit	Released: 20 April 2018; Label: Gill Music; Formats: digital download	—	—
This Heaven Gives Me Migraine	Released: 26 April 2020; Label: Gill Music; Formats: digital download	—	—
Anti Hero	Released: 17 July 2020; Label: Gill Music; Formats: digital download, LP	—	—
"—" denotes releases that did not chart or were not released in that territory.

== Singles ==
Title	Year	Peak chart positions				Album
Title	Year	UK	NZ	US Alt.	US Dance	Album
"Damaged Goods"	1978	—	—	—	39	Entertainment!
"At Home He's a Tourist"	1979	58	—	—	—	Entertainment!
"Outside the Trains Don't Run on Time"	1980	—	—	—	—	Solid Gold
"What We All Want"	1981	—	—	—	30	Solid Gold
"To Hell with Poverty!"	1981	—	—	—	38	Another Day/Another Dollar EP
"I Love a Man in Uniform"	1982	65	—	—	27	Songs of the Free
"Call Me Up (If I'm Home)"	1982	—	—	—	—	Songs of the Free
"Is It Love"	1983	88	—	—	8	Hard
"Silver Lining"	1983	—	—	—	—	Hard
"Is It Love" (live)	1984	—	42	—	—	At the Palace
"Money Talks"	1990	—	—	—	—	Mall
"Don't Fix What Ain't Broke" (US promo-only release)	1991	—	—	14	—	Mall
"Cadillac"	1991	—	—	—	—	Mall
"Satellite" (US-only release)	1991	—	—	—	—	Mall
"Tattoo"	1995	—	—	—	—	Shrinkwrapped
"I Parade Myself" (US promo-only release)	1996	—	—	—	—	Shrinkwrapped
"Second Life"	2008	—	—	—	—	Non-album single
"You Don't Have to Be Mad"	2010	—	—	—	—	Content
"You'll Never Pay for the Farm"	2010	—	—	—	—	Content
"Who Am I?"	2011	—	—	—	—	Content
"Broken Talk" (featuring Alison Mosshart)	2014	—	—	—	—	What Happens Next
"First World Citizen"	2015	—	—	—	—	What Happens Next
"Paper Thin"	2019	—	—	—	—	Happy Now
"Change the Locks"	2019	—	—	—	—	Happy Now
"Forever Starts Now"	2020	—	—	—	—	Anti Hero EP
"Natural's Not in It" (Tom Morello feat. Serj Tankian & Gang of Four)	2021	—	—	—	—	The Problem of Leisure: A Celebration of Andy Gill & Gang of Four
"Elevator" (demo)	2021	—	—	—	—	Gang of Four 77–81
"Where the Nightingale Sings (Redux)" (remix by Robert "3D" Del Naja featuring Nova Twins)	2021	—	—	—	—	The Problem of Leisure: A Celebration of Andy Gill & Gang of Four
"—" denotes releases that did not chart or were not released in that territory.
