= A Brief History of the Twentieth Century =

Compilation album by Gang of Four
- Released: December 1990
- Recorded: 1979–1983
- Genres: Post-punk; new wave; dance-punk; college rock
- Length: 76:20
- Label: Warner Bros.

Gang of Four chronology
Hard (1983)	A Brief History of the Twentieth Century (1990)	Mall (1991)

Professional ratings
Review scores
Source	Rating
AllMusic	4.5/5 stars
Robert Christgau	A−

A Brief History of the Twentieth Century is the first compilation album by Gang of Four. It was released in December 1990. The liner notes are by Greil Marcus.

== Track listing ==
No.	Title	Length
1.	"At Home He's a Tourist"	3:32
2.	"Damaged Goods"	3:28
3.	"Natural's Not in It"	3:06
4.	"Not Great Men"	3:06
5.	"Anthrax"	4:23
6.	"Return the Gift"	3:06
7.	"It's Her Factory"	3:09
8.	"What We All Want" (recorded live at Hammersmith Palais, 30/03/81)	5:11
9.	"Paralysed"	3:22
10.	"A Hole in the Wallet"	3:24
11.	"Cheeseburger"	4:07
12.	"To Hell with Poverty!"	4:37
13.	"Capital (It Fails Us Now)"	4:03
14.	"Call Me Up"	3:36
15.	"I Will Be a Good Boy"	3:10
16.	"The History of the World"	4:39
17.	"I Love a Man in Uniform"	4:07
18.	"Is It Love"	4:34
19.	"Woman Town"	4:30
20.	"We Live as We Dream, Alone"	3:37

- Tracks 1–6 are from the album Entertainment! (1979)
- Track 7 is from the Yellow EP (1980)
- Tracks 9–11 are from the album Solid Gold (1981)
- Tracks 8 and 12–13 are from the EP Another Day/Another Dollar (1982)
- Tracks 14–17 and 20 are from the album Songs of the Free (1982)
- Tracks 18–19 are from the album Hard (1983)
