= Turn Ons =

Studio album by The Hotrats
- Released: 23 December 2009
- Recorded: 2009 in The Hospital
- Genre: Indie rock
- Length: 36:31
- Label: (United Kingdom) G&D Records (United States) Fat Possum Records (Japan) Hostess Entertainment
- Producer: Nigel Godrich

Singles from Turn Ons
- 1. "Damaged Goods"/"(You Gotta) Fight for Your Right (To Party!)" Released: 26 October 2009; 2. "Pump It Up" Released: 18 January 2010

Professional ratings
Review scores
Source	Rating
Allmusic	4.5/5 stars
BBC Music	(Favorable)
Pitchfork Media	(4/10)
PopMatters	(7/10)
Q	4/5 stars
Spin	3.5/5 stars
The Guardian	(Unfavourable)

Turn Ons is a covers album by The Hotrats. It was released in the UK on 25 January 2010. The album has received generally favorable reviews since its release. It entered the US Heatseekers at number 40.

== Track listing ==
No.	Title	Writer(s)	Original artist	Length
1.	"I Can't Stand It"	Lou Reed	The Velvet Underground/Lou Reed	2:40
2.	"Big Sky"	Ray Davies	The Kinks	3:00
3.	"The Crystal Ship"	Jim Morrison, Ray Manzarek, John Densmore, Robby Krieger	The Doors	2:34
4.	"(You Gotta) Fight for Your Right (To Party!)"	Adam Horovitz, Adam Yauch, Michael Diamond, Rick Rubin	Beastie Boys	2:41
5.	"Damaged Goods"	Dave Allen, Hugo Burnham, Andy Gill, Jon King	Gang of Four	3:07
6.	"Love Is the Drug"	Bryan Ferry, Andrew Mackay	Roxy Music	3:42
7.	"Bike"	Syd Barrett	Pink Floyd	2:42
8.	"Pump It Up"	Declan MacManus	Elvis Costello	2:41
9.	"The Lovecats"	Robert Smith	The Cure	3:03
10.	"Queen Bitch"	David Bowie	David Bowie	3:02
11.	"E.M.I."	Steve Jones, Paul Cook, Glen Matlock, John Lydon	Sex Pistols	3:24
12.	"Up the Junction"	Chris Difford, Glenn Tilbrook	Squeeze	3:21
Total length:				36:31

Bonus tracks (available only on iTunes and Japanese edition)
No.	Title	Writer(s)	Original artist	Length
13.	"Mirror in the Bathroom"	Andy Cox, Everett Morton, Ranking Roger, Saxa, David Steele, Dave Wakeling	The Beat	2:48
14.	"West End Girls"	Neil Tennant, Chris Lowe	The Pet Shop Boys	2:57
Total length:				42:16
