= Yellow EP =

Untitled "Yellow" EP

EP by Gang of Four
- Released: October 1980
- Recorded: 1979–1980
- Genre: Post-punk, dance-punk, art punk
- Length: 12:47
- Label: Warner Bros.
- Producer: Gang of Four

Gang of Four chronology
Entertainment! (1979)	Untitled "Yellow" EP (1980)	Solid Gold (1981)

Professional ratings
Review scores
Source	Rating
AllMusic	4.5/5 stars
MusicHound Rock: The Essential Album Guide	3/5 stars
The Rolling Stone Album Guide	2.5/5 stars
Spin Alternative Record Guide	7/10

The so-called Yellow EP is an untitled 12" Gang of Four EP released in 1980 by Warner Bros. It consists of songs issued as singles by EMI Records in the UK. It is known as the Yellow EP because of its sleeve color. All four songs were later included on Infinite Zero Archive/American Recordings's 1995 CD reissue of Entertainment!

== Track listing ==
All songs written and produced by Gang of Four.

=== Side one ===
1. "Outside the Trains Don't Run on Time" – 3:13 (recorded March 1980. A re-recorded version later appeared on Solid Gold in 1981)
2. "He'd Send in the Army" – 3:39 (recorded March 1980. A re-recorded version later appeared on Solid Gold)

=== Side two ===
1. "It's Her Factory" – 3:07 (recorded March 1979. Originally released as the B-side of the "At Home He's a Tourist" single)
2. "Armalite Rifle" – 2:48 (recorded June 1979. An earlier version was released in December 1978 as B-side to Gang of Four's 1st single, Damaged Goods, recorded for Fast Product Records)

== Personnel ==
- Dave Allen - bass guitar, vocals
- Hugo Burnham - drums, vocals
- Andy Gill - guitar, vocals
- Jon King - vocals
