= Hard (Gang of Four album) =

Studio album by Gang of Four
- Released: September 1983
- Studio: Criteria (Miami)
- Genre: Dance-rock
- Length: 36:33
- Label: EMI
- Producers: Howard Albert, Ron Albert, Jon King, Andrew Gill

Gang of Four chronology
Songs of the Free (1982)	Hard (1983)	A Brief History of the Twentieth Century (1990)

Singles from Hard
- 1. "Is It Love" Released: 1983; 2. "Silver Lining" Released: 1983

Hard is the fourth studio album by the English post-punk group Gang of Four. It was originally released in 1983 on Warner Bros. Records and was the first album to not feature original member Hugo Burnham, while Dave Allen had already left before the previous album, Songs of the Free.

The album was reissued as part of a two-CD package along with the band's 1981 album Solid Gold.

== Critical reception ==
Professional ratings
Review scores
Source	Rating
AllMusic	3/5 stars
Robert Christgau	B
Pitchfork Media	3.8/10
The Rolling Stone Album Guide	2/5 stars
Spin Alternative Record Guide	4/10

The New York Times wrote that "Gang of Four have seriously compromised its hard-edged dance rock for a gauzy, overly arranged pop sound that's closer to traditional disco than to the aggressively stomping dance music that has won the group a serious following."

== Track listing ==
All tracks composed by Andy Gill and Jon King; except where indicated

1. "Is It Love" (Gill) – 4:35
2. "I Fled" – 3:54
3. "Silver Lining" – 4:13
4. "Woman Town" (Gill) – 5:12
5. "A Man with a Good Car" – 3:45
6. "It Don't Matter" – 3:54
7. "Arabic" – 3:39
8. "A Piece of My Heart" – 3:14
9. "Independence" – 4:05

== Personnel ==
Gang of Four

- Jon King – vocals, melodica
- Andrew Gill – guitar, vocals, additional drums
- Sara Lee – bass

with:

- Jon Astrop – bass on "Is It Love", "I Fled", "It Don't Matter" and "A Piece of My Heart"
- Alfa Anderson, Brenda White King, Chuck Kirkpatrick, John Sambataro – backing vocals
- Mike Lewis – conductor of strings and horns

Technical

- John Rollo – recording
- Scott Heiser – photography
