= The Peel Sessions (Gang of Four album) =

Compilation album by Gang of Four
- Released: 1990
- Genre: Post-punk
- Length: 39:10
- Label: Dutch East India
- Producer: Bob Sargeant; Phil Stannard

Professional ratings
Review scores
Source	Rating
AllMusic	4/5 stars

The Peel Sessions is a compilation album by Gang of Four.

== Track listing ==
All songs written by Dave Allen, Hugo Burnham, Andy Gill, and Jon King, except as noted.

1. "I Found That Essence Rare"
2. "Return The Gift"
3. "5.45"
4. "At Home He’s A Tourist"
5. "Natural’s Not In It"
6. "Not Great Men"
7. "Ether"
8. "Guns Before Butter"
9. "Paralysed" (Gill, King)
10. "History’s Bunk" (Gill, King)
11. "To Hell With Poverty!"

== Personnel ==
Personnel taken from The Peel Sessions liner notes.

Gang of Four

- Jon King – lead vocals, melodica
- Andy Gill – guitar, vocals
- Dave Allen – bass, vocals
- Hugo Burnham – drums, vocals

Production

- Bob Sargeant – production (tracks 1–8)
- Phil Stannard – production (tracks 9–11)
