= Another Day/Another Dollar =

EP by Gang of Four
- Released: January 1982
- Recorded: 1981
- Genre: Post-punk
- Length: 21:06
- Label: Warner Bros. Records
- Producer: Andy Gill, Jon King, Nick Launay

Gang of Four chronology
Solid Gold (1981)	Another Day/Another Dollar (1982)	Songs of the Free (1982)

Singles from Another Day/Another Dollar
- 1. "To Hell With Poverty!" Released: 1981

Professional ratings
Review scores
Source	Rating
Allmusic	3.5/5 stars
Robert Christgau	A

Another Day/Another Dollar is a 12" vinyl EP by Gang of Four, released in 1982 in the US, by Warner Bros. Records. The release is a compilation of material previously unreleased in the US. The first two tracks were released in the UK as a single. The third track is the b-side of the UK only single "What We All Want," and the last two tracks are excerpted from a live show recorded at the Hammersmith Palais, in London, on 3/30/81. All five songs from the EP later appeared on the EMI Records and Infinite Zero Archive/American Recordings's 1995 CD reissue of the 1981 LP Solid Gold.

== Track listing ==
All tracks written by Dave Allen, Hugo Burnham, Andy Gill and Jon King except as indicated.

1. "To Hell With Poverty!" – 4:59
2. "Capital (It Fails Us Now)" (Gill) – 4:04
3. "History's Bunk!" (Gill, King) – 2:59
4. "Cheeseburger" (Live) – 3:40
5. "What We All Want" (Live) – 5:24

== Personnel ==
- Dave Allen - bass guitar, vocals
- Hugo Burnham - drums, vocals
- Andy Gill - guitar, vocals
- Jon King - vocals

== Charts ==
Album

Year	Chart	Position
1982	Billboard Pop Albums	192

Single

Year	Single	Chart	Position
1982	"To Hell with Poverty!"	Billboard Club Play Singles	38
1990	"To Hell with Poverty!"	UK Singles Charts	100
