= Dark Ride =

Dark Ride may refer to:

- Dark ride, an indoor amusement ride
- Dark Ride (film), a 2006 American horror film
- The Dark Ride, an album by Helloween
- "The Dark Ride", a song Gang of Four from Shrinkwrapped
