= Illustrated Man (band) =

British band active in 1984

- Origin: London, United Kingdom
- Genres: New wave
- Years active: 1984
- Labels: Capitol, EMI
- Past members: Hugo Burnham; Rob Dean; Philip Foxman; Roger Mason

Illustrated Man (c. 1984) were a new wave band formed in London featuring two Britons, Hugo Burnham (ex-Gang of Four) on drums and percussion, Rob Dean (Japan) on guitar and two Australians, singer and bass guitarist Philip Foxman (Supernaut) and Roger Mason on keyboards and synthesisers (Gary Numan touring band, James Freud & the Radio Stars).

They had hits with songs such as "Head over Heels", "Just Enough" and "Fall from Grace" and their sound was likened to UK bands such as Japan, Simple Minds and Duran Duran.

== Biography ==
The band was formed by Philip Foxman who had been the bass guitarist for glam rockers Supernaut (later The Nauts) which disbanded in 1980. Foxman relocated to London where he signed to EMI. He contacted Australian Roger Mason who had been keyboardist for new wave group James Freud & the Radio Stars in Melbourne. The group supported Gary Numan on his Australian tour and, as James Freud & Berlin, they relocated to London. Mason toured with Numan in late 1980 and met Dean when both played on Numan's Dance album recorded in June–July 1981. Hugo Burnham was a member of English post-punk band Gang of Four but left in early 1983 after their third studio album, Songs of the Free (1982). Rob Dean was an early member of new wave group Japan on guitar and left after recording their fourth album, Gentlemen Take Polaroids (1980) and initially worked on a solo album, which was not released.

Consisting of some excellent musicians with a successful track record, the band was initially hailed as a supergroup and released a six-track mini-album, Illustrated Man in 1984. Joey Burnham (ex-Supernaut) also appeared as session drummer on the mini-album. The band had some success with songs such as "Head over Heels", "Just Enough" and "Fall from Grace".

Regarded as an excellent live band, they were thought to be the next big thing but their success was relatively short-lived. The band travelled to New York after the release of the mini-album but disbanded shortly after.

== Members ==
- Hugo Burnham — drums, percussion
- Rob Dean — guitar
- Philip Foxman — bass, vocals, songwriter
- Roger Mason — keyboards, computer

== Discography ==
- Illustrated Man (1984)
