= Ackroyd & Harvey =

Collaboration of two British visual artists

Ackroyd & Harvey is the collaborative practice of British visual artists Heather Ackroyd (born 1959) and Dan Harvey (born 1959). For over three decades their interdisciplinary practice has been investigating nature-based processes of growth and decay, addressing bio-diversity loss and the anthropogenic climate crisis that are rapidly reshaping and rewriting Earth's systems.

They are particularly known for developing a form of pioneering bio-chemical photography that uses the light sensitivity of chlorophyll to create photographic images in living grass. By controlling light exposure during germination, images emerge through variations in chlorophyll density, producing large-scale organic photographs that evolve over time.

Their installations and public artworks have been exhibited internationally in museums, galleries, biennales, and public spaces including Tate Modern (London), Hayward Gallery (London), Isabella Stewart Gardner Museum (Boston, US), Art Gallery of New South Wales (Sydney, Australia). In 2025, their art was displayed on huge billboards across the UK and Brazil.

Ackroyd & Harvey: The Art of Activism by award-winning documentary filmmaker Fiona Cunnigham-Reid is an intimate portrait of the artists filmed over five years, 2019-2024. Intrinsically bound up in peaceful protest, the film follows the pair collaborating with Extinction Rebellion, and co-founding the movement, Culture Declares Emergency. The film is currently being screened across the United States.

== Life and career ==
=== Heather Ackroyd ===
Heather Ackroyd was born in 1959 in Huddersfield, West Yorkshire, England. She studied Creative Arts at Crewe & Alsager College in Cheshire, graduating with a BA (Hons) First Class in 1980, where she developed an early interest in multidisciplinary art practice and experimental performance, working with seedling grass to make sculpture. Whilst at college Ackroyd and fellow colleagues co-founded Optik, a theatre making process based on the interplay between image, sound, action, expression and humour.

Throughout the 1980s and 1990s Ackroyd was active at the forefront of contemporary theatre performance, working amongst others with Impact Theatre Co-operative, Lumiere & Son, Graeme Miller, Gary Stevens, The People Show and director Katie Mitchell at the Royal Shakespeare Company.

In 1988, she received Arts Council funding to research and develop Uses of Enchantment, a devised theatre piece for six performers, exploring fairytale, myth and desire within the garden. Ackroyd grew a large 'flying' grass carpet from seed, transforming the barren garden into a lush idyll. The work premiered at the Institute of Contemporary Arts, London in 1989, with a subsequent tour across the UK. She also grew a life-size grass camel reflecting on the impacts of global warming as reported in 1988 by American climatologist James Hansen.

=== Dan Harvey ===
Born in Dorking, Surrey, England, in 1959, Dan Harvey pursued sculpture at Cardiff College of Art, graduating in 1981 with a BA (Hons) First Class. He continued his studies at the Royal College of Art, London, graduating in 1984 with an MA (RCA) in Sculpture.

In 1985, Harvey co-founded Laboratorio Aperto, an artists' community in Bussana Vecchia, Italy. He had two solo exhibitions at Birch & Conran Fine Art, Soho, London, in 1987 and 1988.

Harvey's sculptural work gained recognition in the film industry, starting in 1988 when his sculpture was featured on the sets of Peter Greenaway's Drowning by Numbers. He subsequently contributed to Greenaway's films The Cook, The Thief, His Wife & Her Lover, and was involved in the creation of the books for Prospero's Books and the grass set for Caliban's Pit. In 1989, he created a growing grass book and the set for the 'Dream' sequence in Derek Jarman's War Requiem. The grass book is on view at Prospect Cottage, Dungeness, England.

His early sculptural practice frequently incorporated naturally found objects and bones, focusing on his interpretation of the natural world and the human relationship within it. His sculptures are held in numerous private and public collections, including the Royal College of Art and the Sainsbury Centre for Visual Arts.

=== Collaboration ===
Ackroyd & Harvey began collaborating in 1990 where their partnership developed a distinctive interdisciplinary practice combining sculpture, photography, architecture and environmental research.

Over subsequent decades they produced installations incorporating living biological materials such as grass, trees and organic matter, creating works that evolve through natural processes and the passage of time.

They also explored processes of inorganic growth, experimenting with crystal growth, deposition and erosion.

Their work frequently addresses ecological systems, environmental change and the relationship between human activity and political ecologies.

Many projects involve collaborations with scientists, botanists, architects, historians and environmental researchers, reflecting the artists' interest in the intersection of art, ecology and scientific enquiry.

In 2019 they co-founded Culture Declares Emergency, an international network of artists and cultural organisations advocating climate action and socio-ecological responsibility within the arts sector.

Ackroyd & Harvey have also incorporated living grass garments into their work. Their Grass Coats were presented on the catwalk at the London Hippodrome as part of the anti-fur campaign organised by the conservation group Respect for Animals.

Using controlled light exposure during germination, the artists produced tiger-stripe patterns in the grass through variations in chlorophyll development. The coat was later regrown for an environmental fashion show in Dublin in 1995 and exhibited at Sotheby's in London in 2001.

In 2019 the artists revisited the concept with a series of grass coats worn during climate demonstrations organised by Extinction Rebellion in London,

Together Ackroyd & Harvey have one daughter, Adèle, and live and work between Surrey in the UK and the Veneto region of Italy. Tania is Dan's first child. Born in London 1982, she lives in Italy with her two daughters.

== Early works ==
L'Altro Lato (The Other Side), their first collaborative project, was presented at Laboratorio Aperto in Bussana Vecchia, Italy. During this project the artists observed the light-sensitive behaviour of chlorophyll in germinating grass. A ladder placed leaning against the growing grass wall blocked light and prevented chlorophyll formation, leaving a yellow silhouette. This observation led to the development of their pioneering technique of creating photographic images through controlled light exposure during plant growth. This formative collaborative experience in Italy also inspired their initial imagining to grow the interior of a deconsecrated church, later realised in 2013.

Early installations explored the relationship between architecture, light and biological processes. Works such as Grass House (1991), commissioned by Hull Time Based Arts in the UK involved growing grass over the facade of a derelict Victorian property with constructed installations in the interior rooms.

Theaterhaus Gessnerallee (1993) in Zurich took growing the facade of a building onto a monumental scale. Both works had a specially composed soundtrack by Graeme Miller.

During the mid-1990s the artists began presenting work in Australia and New Zealand. Projects included 89–91 Lake Street (1994) for the Perth Festival, and The Divide (1996) for the New Zealand International Festival of the Arts.

Host (1996) was their first art-architecture collaborative installation initiated by the Public Art Commissions Agency and curated by Nuova Icona Gallery for the 6th Biennale of Architecture of Venice. In collaboration with architect Pierre d'Avoine, Ackroyd & Harvey created a series of sculptural works in the Nuova Icona Gallery, a living installation in the disused Oratorio di San Ludovico, and an interactive street artwork.

Later works of the decade further developed their photosynthetic imagery and environmental installations. These included Floating Field (1997) at Akerby Sculpture Park in Sweden, Photosynthesis (Testament) (1998) at The Icehouse in Hull, and Blasted Oak (1999), part of the Secret Gardens series commissioned for the Salisbury Arts Festival in England.

== Major projects ==
Ackroyd & Harvey have produced a range of large-scale installations and public artworks, many commissioned for cultural institutions and major international events.

Beuys' Acorns (2007–present) A long-term ecological artwork inspired by Joseph Beuys' project "7000 Oaks – City Forestation Instead of City Administration". The project involves cultivating oak trees grown from acorns descended from Beuys's original planting. Circles of seven trees are currently being planted in different locations as a distributed environmental artwork with integrated community engagement intended to expand over time.

rïvus (2022) the 23rd Biennale of Sydney. For this commission, Ackroyd and Harvey created a series of large-scale portrait works. The project featured images of Gadigal Elder Uncle Charles "Chicka" Madden and his granddaughter Lille Madden, a First Nations director at Groundswell and former climate activist with SeedMob. The portraits were photographed beneath the Sydney Harbour Bridge at Tar-Ra (Dawes Point), a site of cultural and historical significance on Gadigal land. The works were presented at multiple locations across Sydney, including The Cutaway at Barangaroo, and the Art Gallery of New South Wales. Commissioned by the Biennale of Sydney as part of the UK/Australia Season, the project formed part of the exhibition theme rīvus, which explored water systems, ecology and connections to place.

On the Shore (2021) A performative environmental artwork created by Ackroyd & Harvey in collaboration with the writer Sir Ben Okri at the Tate Modern in London. A large banner of living grass bearing a text by Okri was grown in the Turbine Hall using the artists' chlorophyll photogram. The banner was later carried by performers to the River Thames and floated on the water as part of a public performance addressing the climate and ecological emergency. This stage of the work was commissioned by the Extinction Rebellion affiliated group XR Writers Rebel.

Stranded (2006) A sculpture featuring a minke whale skeleton encrusted with mineral crystals. The work has been exhibited at the Natural History Museum, London, Mirakan Museum, Japan, and as part of the Liverpool Biennial. The piece reflects on marine ecology, ocean acidification and environmental change.

Dilston Grove (2003) An installation in a former church in South London in which the interior architecture was planted with living grass. Through application of clay, germinating grass seed, water and natural light the boundary between growth and decay, reverie and renewal were explored within this repository of spiritual memory.

== Public commissions ==
History Trees (2012) A permanent public artwork created for the Queen Elizabeth Olympic Park in London as part of the cultural programme associated with the London 2012 Olympic Games. The project consists of sculptural tree works installed throughout the park incorporating engraved metal bands containing historical texts relating to the archaeological, industrial, ecological and social history of the Lea Valley.

Seeing Red..Overdrawn (2016–2018) A participatory artwork created for the David Attenborough Building in Cambridge, home to the Cambridge Conservation Initiative. The work draws on the IUCN Red List of Threatened Species and presents the names of 4,734 species assessed as Critically Endangered in October 2015. The species names were printed faintly and participants were invited to overwrite them with an indelible pen, bringing each species into visibility.

FlyTower (2007) A large-scale installation covering the fly tower of the Royal National Theatre in London with living grass. The work transformed the theatre's exterior façade into a temporary organic living surface.

== Exhibitions ==
Recent exhibitions and projects include presentations at Klima Biennale Wien, Austria; The Gallery Season 5, Brazil/UK; Culture Reforesting at Orleans House Gallery, London; La Galeria, University of California, Merced; Science Gallery London; European Capital of Culture Tartu 2024; the Royal Academy Summer Exhibition; the Hayward Gallery, London; the Isabella Stewart Gardner Museum, Boston; the Kimball Art Center, Utah; the 23rd Biennale of Sydney; Somerset House, London; Lewisham Borough of Culture 2022; Tate Modern, London; and the Ashmolean Museum, Oxford.

=== Selected exhibitions ===
- 2025 – The Gallery Season 5, Brazil/UK
- 2024 – Science Gallery London, England
- 2023 – Hayward Gallery, London, England
- 2023 – 23rd Biennale of Sydney, Australia
- 2022 – Somerset House, London, England
- 2021 – Tate Modern, London, England
- 2001 & 2012 – Isabella Stewart Gardner Museum, Boston, United States

== Awards and grants ==
Ackroyd & Harvey have received several awards and grants including:

- L'Oréal Art and Science of Colour Grand Prize (2000)
- NESTA Innovation Pioneer Award (2001)
- Wu Guanzhong Prize for Innovation (2012)
- Rose Award for Photography, Royal Academy Summer Exhibition (2014)
- Award for Outstanding Artistic Merit, Stony Brook University, Long Island, New York (2019)
- Arts Council of England Project Grant - Art in a Time of Emergency (2020)
- Arts Council of England Covid Cultural Recovery Grant (2021)
- Arts Council of England Project Grant in collaboration with Zena Edwards - Lewisham Borough of Culture (2022)
- Arts Council of England Project Grant (2025) - Beuys' Acorns ~ The Prelude & The Planting

== Publications and media ==
Their work has been extensively discussed in numerous publications on art, the environment and art–science collaboration including Dear Earth: Art and Hope in a Time of Crisis, The Art of Science, Art & Ecology Now, Nature, Aperture, the British Journal of Photography and Resurgence & Ecologist.

Ackroyd & Harvey's writings have also been featured in books, such as, Energy Culture: Art and Theory on Oil and Beyond, Playing For Time: making art as if the world mattered and Signs of Life: Bio Art and Beyond.

=== Film ===
In 2025 the film Ackroyd & Harvey: The Art of Activism, directed by Fiona Cunningham-Reid, premiered at the Tate Modern in London.

The film documents the artists' three-decade collaboration and their engagement with environmental activism, including their involvement in climate movements and the founding of Culture Declares Emergency.

Following its world premiere at Tate Modern on 6 June 2025, the film was later released in cinemas in the United Kingdom and Ireland in September 2025 and was also shown at the Kochi-Muziris Biennale, Kerala, India on 15 December 2025 and 16 February 2026.

== Lectures and academic engagement ==
Ackroyd & Harvey have delivered lectures and presentations internationally at universities and cultural institutions including amongst others, Harvard University, London School of Economics, Royal Institute of British Architects, Tate Modern and Trinity College, Cambridge.

In May 2009 Heather Ackroyd presented at the Nobel Laureate Symposium on Creativity, Leadership and Climate Change at the Science Museum, London.

Ackroyd & Harvey delivered the Goethe Institute Annual Lecture 2025 in London discussing their long-term ecological artwork Beuys' Acorns.
