= I Love a Man in Uniform =

I Love a Man in Uniform may refer to:

- I Love a Man in Uniform (film), a 1993 Canadian film directed by David Wellington
- "I Love a Man in a Uniform," a song by Gang of Four from their 1982 album Songs of the Free
