= Solid Gold (album) =

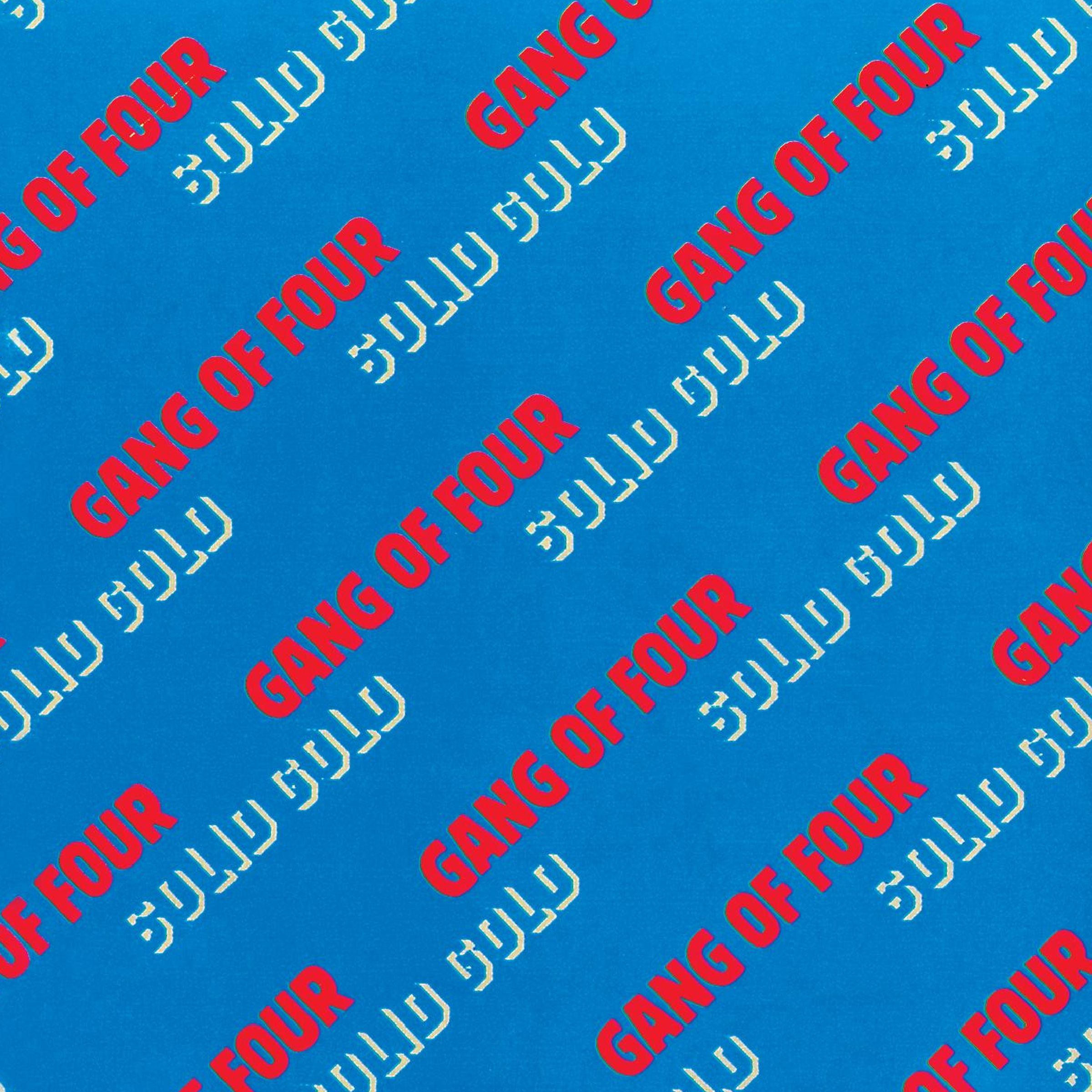

Studio album by Gang of Four
- Released: March 1981
- Recorded: January 1981
- Studio: Abbey Road (London)
- Genres: Post-punk; dance-punk
- Length: 38:43
- Labels: EMI; Warner Bros.
- Producers: Dave Allen; Hugo Burnham; Jimmy Douglass; Andy Gill; Jon King

Gang of Four chronology
Yellow EP (1980)	Solid Gold (1981)	Another Day/Another Dollar (1982)

Singles from Solid Gold
- 1. "Outside the Trains Don’t Run on Time" Released: 1980; 2. "What We All Want" Released: 1981

Solid Gold is the second album by the British post-punk band Gang of Four, released in 1981. Two of its tracks, "Outside the Trains Don't Run on Time" and "He'd Send in the Army", are re-recordings of songs previously released as a single in the UK.

The album was issued in a CD expanded version by the EMI Records and Infinite Zero Archive/American Recordings labels in 1995, which added the songs from Another Day/Another Dollar EP.

== Critical reception ==
Professional ratings
Review scores
Source	Rating
AllMusic	4.5/5 stars
Christgau's Record Guide	A
Pitchfork	9.5/10
Record Mirror	4/5 stars
Rolling Stone	4/5 stars
The Rolling Stone Album Guide	3/5 stars
Spin Alternative Record Guide	9/10
Uncut	4/5 stars
Under the Radar	9/10

Despite not receiving the same acclaim as the band's debut, Entertainment! (1979), the album was well received by critics, though many felt it was not as consistent as the debut. Pitchfork listed as the 24th best album of the 1980s.

The Boston Globe wrote that, "even if musical experiment on this album generally succeeds, there are few memorable riffs, let alone much that's hummable or danceable, unlike the Gang's first album." The Globe and Mail opined that "the guitar work is consistently scratchy and feverish, busting out of the mix at crucial points to carry along some of the duller items." Milo Miles of Rolling Stone gave a positive review, but found "Andy Gill and Jon King's rejection of character nuance and simple, messy pleasures cuts them off from the rock mainstream all right, but it also prevents shared, everyday experiences. Worse, it makes the band members seem as distanced and bland as any arena-rock superstars. The novelty of passionate rock & rollers who are never personal has worn off."

Robert Christgau of The Village Voice, gave it an A, saying "Not for its politics, which unlike some of my more ideological comrades I find suspiciously lacking in charity. And not for its funk, which like some of my more funky comrades I find suspiciously lacking in on-the-one. And certainly not for its melodies. I admire it, and dig it to the nth, for its tensile contradictions, which are mostly a function of sprung harmony, a perfect model for the asynchronous union at the heart of their political (and rhythmic) message."

Andy Kellman of AllMusic observed, "Gang of Four's existence had as much to do with Slave and Chic as it did the Sex Pistols and the Stooges, which is something Solid Gold demonstrates more than Entertainment!", and concluded "This is a nickel less spectacular than the debut, but owning one and not the other would be criminal."

Uncut called it the band's best album, saying it "catches them at their furious finest, shuffling between the personal politics of consumption and longing ("What We All Want") with broader assaults on, for example, US cultural hegemony ("Cheeseburger") and the continuing asset-stripping project of Thatcherism. This is worth owning if only for "History's Bunk", a former B-side with incontinent guitar flamethrowing that demonstrates, like PiL, that punk and fretboard excess weren't incompatible." Joe Tangari of Pitchfork, declared it "a canonical record" saying, "for anyone with even a passing interest in the post-punk era, it's a must-own."

== Track listing ==
All lyrics are written by Jon King; all music is composed by Gang of Four, except as indicated.

Side one
No.	Title	Writer(s)	Length
1.	"Paralysed"	Andy Gill, King	3:22
2.	"What We All Want"	Lyrics King	4:59
3.	"Why Theory?"	Lyrics: Gill, King	2:33
4.	"If I Could Keep It for Myself"	Lyrics King	4:09
5.	"Outside the Trains Don't Run on Time"		3:19

Side two
No.	Title	Writer(s)	Length
1.	"Cheeseburger"	Lyrics: Gill, King	4:05
2.	"The Republic"	Lyrics King; Music: Gill	3:21
3.	"In the Ditch"	Lyrics King	4:22
4.	"A Hole in the Wallet"	Lyrics King; Music: Gill	4:05
5.	"He'd Send in the Army"	Lyrics: Gill, King	4:28

On the original EMI (UK) pressing of the LP, "Why Theory?" is track 5 rather than track 3.

The EMI Records and Infinite Zero/American 1995 reissue includes songs from the Another Day/Another Dollar EP.

CD reissue bonus tracks
No.	Title	Writer(s)	Length
11.	"To Hell With Poverty!"		4:59
12.	"Capital (It Fails Us Now)"	Gill	4:04
13.	"History's Bunk!"	Gill, King	2:59
14.	"Cheeseburger" (Live)		3:40
15.	"What We All Want" (Live)		5:24

== Personnel ==
Gang of Four

- Dave Allen – bass guitar, vocals
- Hugo Burnham – drums, vocals
- Andy Gill – guitar, vocals
- Jon King – vocals

Technical

- Jimmy Douglass – engineer
- Andy Gill, Jon King – design

== Charts ==
Album

Year	Chart	Position
1981	Billboard Pop Albums	190

Single

Year	Single	Chart	Position
1981	"What We All Want"	Billboard Club Play Singles	30
