= Steve Shill =

British director, screenwriter and actor

- Born: Stephen A Shill; 1957 (age 68–69); Buckinghamshire, England
- Occupations: Television director, television producer, actor, screenwriter, film director.
- Years active: 1988–present

Stephen A Shill (born 1957) is a British television and film director, actor, screenwriter and television producer. His directing credits include EastEnders, Casualty, The Sopranos, The Wire, Rome, Carnivàle, Deadwood, Big Love, The Tudors, Brotherhood, Dexter, The Kill Point, Knight Rider, Law & Order, Night Stalker, Invasion, Commander in Chief, Dragnet, ER, The West Wing, Deadwood, Obsessed, Ben Hur, The Good Wife. His acting credits include The Last Temptation of Christ, Kinsey, and Being Human.

== Early life ==
Shill was born in 1957 in Buckinghamshire, England. He attended Keswick Grammar School in Keswick, Cumbria, England in the 1970s, and was a student at University of Leeds, in their Fine Arts Department, where he studied painting, printing and photography; He graduated in 1980.

== Career ==
After leaving university, he became a member of Impact Theatre Co-operative, and wrote, directed and produced his own theatre work under his own name for 10 years. He completed the BBC Drama Director's Course, he began his television directing career with episodes of EastEnders, and Casualty for the BBC.

He moved to the United States and worked on many successful shows produced by premium cable network HBO, including The Sopranos, The Wire, Rome, Carnivàle, Deadwood, and Big Love.

He directed the pilot episode of Showtime's The Tudors, and served as a regular director and executive producer throughout the first season. He has also directed episodes of Showtime's Brotherhood and Dexter. Shill directed all eight episodes of Spike TV's The Kill Point mini-series and also served as an executive producer. Shill directed and co-executive produced the 2008 Knight Rider TV movie that served as a pilot for the 2008 follow-up series. Shill has also directed numerous episodes of memorable network programs, including three episodes of Law & Order, Night Stalker, Invasion, Commander in Chief, Dragnet, ER, and The West Wing.

Shill joined the HBO western drama Deadwood, as a director for the first season in 2004. The series was created by David Milch and focused on a growing town in the American West. Shill directed the episode "Jewel's Boot Is Made for Walking". He returned as a director for the second season in 2005 and also wrote an episode. Shill directed the episode "New Money" and wrote and directed the episode "Something Very Expensive". Shill and the writing staff were nominated for a Writers Guild of America Award for Outstanding Drama Series at the February 2006 ceremony for their work on the second season.

Shill directed the theatrical feature Obsessed, starring Idris Elba, Beyoncé Knowles, and Ali Larter. The film opened at number one in the United States of America in April 2009, taking almost $70m at the box office and becoming Screen Gems' second biggest opening weekend in their history. In 2010, Shill directed the miniseries Ben Hur and the first-season episode "Painkiller" for the legal drama series The Good Wife. That same year, he received an Emmy Award for Outstanding Directing for a Drama Series for Dexter episode "The Getaway". Shill had acting roles in the films The Last Temptation of Christ, The Missing Reel, Kinsey and Being Human.
