= Impact Theatre Co-operative =

Theatre company in Leeds, West Yorkshire, England, active 1979–1986

Impact Theatre Co-operative was an experimental theatre company founded in Leeds, West Yorkshire, England. It was active between 1979 and 1986.

The company's work was a fusion of text, music, visual and performance art.

Impact Theatre Co-operative's major productions were:

- Ice (1979)
- The Undersea World of Erik Satie (1980)
- Certain Scenes (1980)
- Dämmerungsstrasse 55 (1981)
- Useful Vices (1982)
- No Weapons for Mourning (1983)
- A Place in Europe (1983)
- Songs of the Clay People (1984)
- The Carrier Frequency (1985) – written with Russell Hoban

The core members of the company were:

- Pete Brooks
- Richard Hawley
- Tyrone Huggins
- Claire MacDonald
- Graeme Miller
- Steve Shill
- Niki Johnson
- Heather Ackroyd
- Hugo Burnham (early founding member, before returning to Gang of Four)

== Contemporary evaluations ==
In an interview published in 1987, Russell Hoban, who collaborated with Impact on The Carrier Frequency, said he had responded to a question (from Fiction Magazine in 1983) about the best piece of fiction he had seen that year, by talking about Impact's No Weapons for Mourning. He said in part: "The distinction of No Weapons for Mourning has to do with a perceptual phenomenon of our time. ... the performance, not realistic, but hyperreal, has a syntax of image and sound, speech and movement ... These young artists effectively demonstrate that the circuitry originates not with computers but with the human mind, and it is there for survival as well as annihilation."

== The legacy of Impact Theatre ==
Though Impact Theatre Cooperative disbanded in 1986, its creations – especially The Carrier Frequency – continue to be important in the history of devised and physical theatre. Frances Babbage, writing about a symposium held in connection with Stan's Cafe's recreation of The Carrier Frequency in 1999, said: "Many companies since have cited Impact as a major inspiration, with The Carrier Frequency in particular achieving almost mythic status", while Alison Oddey mentions The Carrier Frequency in her book on devised theatre, Devising Theatre: A Practical and Theoretical Handbook
