= Damaged Goods (song) =

Single by Gang of Four

from the album Entertainment!
- B-side: "Armalite Rifle"; "Love Like Anthrax"
- Released: 13 October 1978
- Recorded: Cargo (Rochdale, England)
- Genre: Post-punk, punk funk, dance-punk
- Length: 3:34 (single version); 3:29 (album version)
- Label: Fast Product
- Songwriter: Gang of Four
- Producers: Fast Product; Gang of Four

Gang of Four singles chronology
"Damaged Goods" (1978)	"At Home He's a Tourist" (1979)

"Damaged Goods" is a song by the English post-punk band Gang of Four. Acting as their debut single, it was released on 13 October 1978 through independent record label Fast Product. Produced by Fast Product owner Bob Last under the alias "Fast Product", the single received critical acclaim, prompting the band to sign to major label EMI. The title track and "Love Like Anthrax" were re-recorded for Gang of Four's debut album Entertainment! in 1979 and the whole EP was included in the Fast Product compilation Mutant Pop in 1980.

== Music and lyrics ==
Gang of Four – "Damaged Goods" (1978)

The title track starts with syncopated bass and guitar, which are later accompanied with the drums. The song also features vocals by Jon King, which take the role of "a lonesome, longing lament" and a "nearly spoken-word" section sung by the band's guitarist Andy Gill. AllMusic critic Tom Maginnis argued that the track is "the closest thing approaching a traditional pop single from their influential first record," while noting the "uncharacteristic lightness and bounce from Dave Allen's superb, hooky bass line, countered with a constant hacking rhythm guitar from Andy Gill." He also described the result as "almost danceable, skewed only by singer Jon King's indignant rant." NME also stated that the track "boasts a riff that could slice through a particularly strong girder, the coldest funk this side of Prince & The Revolution."

Lyrically, the song is about "sexual politics," with "a sexual/political double entendre providing the crux of the song's message." Kevin J.H. Dettmar, the author of Gang of Four's Entertainment!, argued that "the song's protagonist shows no self-awareness." In a 2009 interview with Clash magazine, singer and lyricist Jon King stated that he was inspired by an "in-store slogan" in a Morrisons supermarket in Leeds, using it as "a good starter for words about a doomed relationship where legover had become, maybe, too much of a good thing." Magginis also noted that the lyrics "could summarize the collective attitude of the post-punk era, bidding adieu to the more optimistic music of the '60s and self-absorbed '70s with a singalong chorus."

== Artwork ==
The single cover art attributes influences to Situationism and Deconstructionism. It features the bold black sans-serif title over a deep pink background, similar to the design of the short-lived Vorticist magazine Blast. The self-referencing text, "the sleeve for a Gang of Four recording of 'Damaged Goods,' 'Love Like Anthrax' and 'Armalite Rifle' is scrolled around the title. The back cover features a tear-out from a newspaper of a female matador spearing a bull and an extract from the band's letter to Bob Last on how they wanted the single sleeve to be. The letter demanded Last to also include a word-for-word transcription of a conversation the band had with a stripper and a comedian as a caption to the newspaper tear-out. Last ignored the band's demands and designed the different sleeve, which included both the tear-out and an excerpt from the letter.

== Reception and legacy ==
Upon its release, "Damaged Goods" received critical acclaim and became an indie hit, which led Gang of Four into signing to EMI. The song's fusion of punk rock and funk was influential in the development of the post-punk movement and inspired future groups such as Fugazi and Rage Against the Machine. Tom Maginnis of AllMusic regarded the song as "a masterful blend of sexual politics with propelling, melodious post-punk angst." On its influence, Maginnis wrote: "Damaged Goods" would prove to be the musical flashpoint of an era, which—along with contemporaries such as the Fall, the Au Pairs, and the Clash—would forge a new radical political agenda in rock & roll. Simon Reynolds, the author of Rip It Up and Start Again: Postpunk 1978-1984, stated that the band "found a totally new way of negotiating that thorny danger zone known as 'politics-in-rock.'" Reynolds further commented: "Abrasive but accessible, Gang of Four avoided both Tom Robinson-style preachy protest and [the] forbidding didacticism of avant-gardists like Henry Cow. Radical form, radical content; yet you could dance to it." Music journalist Paul Lester considered it as "arguably the first post-punk record."

NME listed it as number 46 on the list, "100 Best Tracks of the Seventies."

The working title for Massive Attack's third album was Damaged Goods, named after the song. The band even recorded a cover of it, but it was never released.

== Track listing ==
All tracks are written by Gang of Four.

No.	Title	Length
1.	"Damaged Goods"	3:34
2.	"Love Like Anthrax"	3:03
3.	"Armalite Rifle"	3:18
Total length:		9:55

== Personnel ==
Gang of Four

- Andy Gill – electric guitar, vocals
- Jon King – lead vocals
- Hugo Burnham – drums
- Dave Allen – bass guitar

Technical personnel

- John Brierley – engineering
- Bob Last (credited as Fast Product) – production
- Gang of Four – production

== Cover versions ==
- The Hotrats covered the song on their debut album, Turn Ons (2009).
- The B-side "Love Like Anthrax" was covered by Nine Inch Nails live in 2009. The cover also featured Gary Numan, Mike Garson, Jane's Addiction bassist Eric Avery and the opening act Health.
- IDLES covered the song as a single, produced by Kenny Beats. It's included in the 2021 Gang of Four tribute album The Problem of Leisure: A Celebration of Andy Gill And Gang of Four.
- La Roux covered the song as a single for the 2021 Gang of Four tribute album The Problem of Leisure: A Celebration of Andy Gill And Gang of Four.
