= Mall (album) =

Studio album by Gang of Four
- Released: 1991
- Recorded: 1990–91
- Studios: Maison Rouge, Fulham Broadway; Power Plant, London; Strongroom, Shoreditch
- Genres: Post-punk; funk rock
- Length: 48:53
- Label: Polydor
- Producer: Andy Gill

Gang of Four chronology
A Brief History of the Twentieth Century (1990)	Mall (1991)	Shrinkwrapped (1995)

Professional ratings
Review scores
Source	Rating
AllMusic	2/5 stars
Robert Christgau	(1-star Honorable Mention)
Rolling Stone	4/5 stars

Mall is the fifth studio album by Gang of Four.

Seven years after Gang of Four's breakup, founding members Jon King and Andy Gill reteamed for Mall. Slickly produced, with a heavy emphasis on synthesizers and ersatz funk rhythms, the lyrical focus returns the group to the political arena. As suggested by the title, Mall is laced with the usual examinations of consumerism and the economy, while the sample-heavy "F.M.U.S.A." is an essay on the Vietnam War.

The album features a cover of Bob Marley and the Wailers' "Soul Rebel", from their 1970 album Soul Rebels.

== Critical reception ==
Rolling Stone wrote: "An adventurous, often gripping album that flirts with commercial appeal while indicting American consumer culture, Mall more than justifies the Gang’s return to active duty."

== Track listing ==
All tracks composed by Andy Gill and Jon King; except where indicated

1. "Cadillac" – 5:29
2. "Motel" – 3:34
3. "Satellite" – 3:58
4. "F.M.U.S.A." (Gill) – 5:01
5. "Don't Fix What Ain't Broke" (King) – 4:02
6. "Impossible" – 0:54
7. "Money Talks" (Gill) – 3:36
8. "Soul Rebel" (Bob Marley) – 4:05
9. "Hiromi & Stan Talk" – 0:43
10. "Colour from the Tube" – 3:45
11. "Hey Yeah" – 3:42
12. "Everybody Wants to Come" – 4:01
13. "World Falls Apart" – 6:08

== Personnel ==
- Andy Gill
- Jon King

with:

- Gail Ann Dorsey – bass, backing vocals
- Blair Cunningham, Frank Tontoh, Martyn Ford, Neil Wilkinson, Steve Monti – drums
- Black (Colin Vearncombe), Dave Clarke, Linda Taylor, Louise Goffin, Stan Loubières – backing vocals

Technical

- Bob Kraushaar, Chad Jackson, Jeremy Allom, Mike Dignam, Jim Abbiss, Jock Loveband, Mike Pela – mixing
