= Songs of the Free =

Studio album by Gang of Four
- Released: May 1982
- Recorded: March 1982
- Studios: Ridge Farm Studios, Dorking, Surrey
- Genres: Post-punk; dance-punk; new wave
- Length: 39:32
- Label: EMI
- Producers: Andy Gill, Mike Howlett, Jon King

Gang of Four chronology
Another Day/Another Dollar (1982)	Songs of the Free (1982)	Hard (1983)

Singles from Songs of the Free
- 1. "I Love a Man in Uniform" Released: 1982; 2. "Call Me Up" Released: 1982

Professional ratings
Review scores
Source	Rating
AllMusic	3/5 stars
Rolling Stone	4/5 stars
The Rolling Stone Album Guide	3/5 stars
Spin Alternative Record Guide	8/10
The Village Voice	A−

Songs of the Free is the third studio album by Gang of Four, released in 1982.

It is their first recording with Sara Lee as bassist, replacing Dave Allen. The album also marks a shift towards R&B or funk music, and away from the more abrasive elements in their earlier albums.

In 1996, Infinite Zero Archive/American Recordings label issued it on CD, with two bonus tracks, and with a slightly changed song order (swapping the positions of "Muscle for Brains" and "We Live as We Dream, Alone"), and mistitling "I Love a Man in a Uniform" as "I Love a Man in Uniform." EMI reissued the album on CD in 2008 with the original song order and no bonus tracks.

Pitchfork listed Songs of the Free as 99th best album of the 1980s. Rhino Records re-released Songs of the Free in limited edition of 6,250 on 180-gram blue, purple, and yellow splattered vinyl for Black Friday Record Store Day 2015.

== Track listing ==
All songs written by Andy Gill and Jon King
All songs written at Mount Pleasant Studios, 38 Mount Pleasant, London E1; with special assistance from Jon Astrop

Side one

1. "Call Me Up" – 3:35
2. "I Love a Man in a Uniform" – 4:06
3. "Muscle for Brains" – 3:17
4. "It Is Not Enough" – 3:27
5. "Life! It's a Shame" – 5:06

Side two

6. "I Will Be a Good Boy" – 3:52
7. "The History of the World" – 4:40
8. "We Live as We Dream, Alone" – 3:37
9. "Of the Instant" – 4:58

=== 1996 bonus tracks ===
10. "The World at Fault" – 3:38
11. "I Love a Man in a Uniform" (dub) – 4:48

== Personnel ==
Gang of Four

- Hugo Burnham – drums, percussion
- Andrew Gill – guitar, vocals
- Jon King – vocals, melodica
- Sara Lee – bass, backing vocals

with:

- Stevie Lange – backing vocals
- Joy Yates – backing vocals

Technical

- Simon Smart, Walter Samuel – engineer
- Shot That Tiger! – art direction, design
- Colin Barker – photography

== Charts ==
Album

Year	Chart	Position
1982	Billboard Pop Albums	175
1982	UK Albums Chart	61

Single

Year	Single	Chart	Position
1982	"I Love a Man in a Uniform"	Billboard Club Play Singles	27
1982	"I Love a Man in a Uniform"	UK Singles Charts	65
