= What Happens Next (Gang of Four album) =

Studio album by Gang of Four
- Released: 24 February 2015
- Genre: Industrial rock
- Length: 38:41
- Label: Metropolis/Membran
- Producer: Andy Gill

Gang of Four chronology
Content (2011)	What Happens Next (2015)	Happy Now (2019)

What Happens Next is the eighth studio album by English post-punk band Gang of Four. It was released on 24 February 2015 through Metropolis Records and Membran record label. It is the band's first album to feature John "Gaoler" Sterry on vocals, following vocalist Jon King's departure, which left the guitarist Andy Gill as the sole original member of the band. The previous drummer Mark Heaney, who already recorded several songs for the album left the band during the recording, and being replaced by Jon Finnigan to finished the drum parts for the album.

The album features contributions from Alison Mosshart of the Kills and Dead Weather, German musician Herbert Grönemeyer, The Big Pink member Robbie Furze and Japanese guitarist Tomoyasu Hotei.

== Background ==
Following the release of Gang of Four's seventh studio album, Content (2011) and accompanying touring, vocalist Jon King left the group because "he didn't want to tour anymore." Gill stated that he saw this as an opportunity to do some collaborations and decided to release the new material under the "Gang of Four" name. John "Gaoler" Sterry eventually joined the band as a vocalist and Gill contacted Alison Mosshart and Herbert Grönemeyer for collaborations. The album also features performances from both the band's previous drummer Mark Heaney and the current drummer Jon Finnigan.

The track "Broken Talk" was first streamed in 2013. In November 2014, it was revealed that the band recorded a new version of "Broken Talk" for the album, featuring Mosshart on lead vocals. The music video for the track "England's In My Bones", featuring Mosshart was released on 5 February 2015.

== Musical style ==
The album's style is a departure from Gang of Four's previous sound. The album utilizes "mid-tempo metronomic beats, distorted-megaphone backing vocals, fuzz-filtered basslines, ominous electronic oscillations and keyboards," creating a sound similar to those of mid-1990s alternative rock and industrial-influenced electronic rock acts, such as Nine Inch Nails, Stabbing Westward or God Lives Underwater. The album also features "a less funky and muscular production" compared to the group's previous works, while still keeping "a dance-friendly core to these songs."

== Critical reception ==
Professional ratings
Aggregate scores
Source	Rating
Metacritic	60/100
Review scores
Source	Rating
AllMusic	3/5 stars
The A.V. Club	C
Consequence of Sound	C+
DIY	3/5 stars
NME	6/10
NOW	3/5 Ns
Paste	9/10
Pitchfork	5.6/10
PopMatters	7/10
Rolling Stone	1/5 stars

Upon its release, What Happens Next received mixed reviews from music critics. At Metacritic, which assigns a normalized rating out of 100 to reviews from critics, the album received an average score of 60, which indicates "mixed or average reviews", based on 19 reviews. AllMusic critic Mark Deming wrote that "While there's much here Gill can point to with pride, more than a few fans are likely to feel they didn't get what was advertised." Annie Zaleski of The A.V. Club thought that the album "foments no curiosity, just indifference—and for a band built on commanding attention for its politicized music, it’s a bitter pill to swallow." Dan Caffrey of Consequence of Sound described it as "their least groovy album." Dan Owens of DIY wrote: "Far from snug or welcoming, the Gang’s overpoweringly thick-sounding ninth album is as refreshingly abstract as anything they’ve done before." NME critic Phil Hebblethwaite criticized the band's use of Gang of Four name, describing the album as "a distracted listen" and "an experimental Gill production that should be out under his name only."

NOW critic Mark Streeter wrote: "Gang of Four rein in their frayed energy on What Happens Next, compartmentalized into a broad tonal range and spacious mix." Gillian G. Gaar of Paste praised the album, noting that " the angular guitar attack and the relentless pounding of the drums is a clear indication that the fire still burns within." Stuart Berman of Pitchfork stated that "What’s most disappointing about What Happens Next is not that it will in any way tarnish Gang of Four’s legacy," pointing out that "if Gill had released this as some newly branded collaborative project, no one would question why it wasn’t a Gang of Four album." Austin Price of PopMatters thought that "Gill has made an excellent effort of it here but there’s some reapportioning that needs to be done." By contrast, Rolling Stone critic Amy Rose Spiegel panned the album, writing: "In place of once-sharp radical jabs, we get empty alarmism."

== Track listing ==
All tracks are written by Andy Gill except where noted.

No.	Title	Writer(s)	Length
1.	"Where the Nightingale Sings"		4:03
2.	"Broken Talk" (ft. Alison Mosshart)		4:22
3.	"Isle of Dogs"		3:48
4.	"England's In My Bones" (ft. Alison Mosshart)		3:12
5.	"The Dying Rays" (ft. Herbert Grönemeyer)		3:30
6.	"Obey the Ghost"	Gill, Gaoler	4:37
7.	"First World Citizen" (ft. Gail Ann Dorsey)		4:04
8.	"Stranded"		3:37
9.	"Graven Image" (ft. Robbie Furze)		4:05
10.	"Dead Souls" (ft. Hotei)	Gill, Hotei	3:23
Total length:			38:41

== Personnel ==
Gang of Four

- Andy Gill – guitar, production, drum programming
- Thomas McNeice – bass guitar (1–4, 6–10)
- John "Gaoler" Sterry – lead vocals (1, 3, 6–8, 10)
- Jon Finnigan – drums (1, 3, 5–8, 10)
- Mark Heaney – drums (2, 4, 9)

Additional musicians

- Alison Mosshart – lead vocals (2, 4)
- Herbert Grönemeyer – lead vocals (5)
- Robbie Furze – lead vocals (9)
- Tomoyasu Hotei – guitar (10)
- Gail Ann Dorsey – co-lead vocals (7)
- Josh Rumble – backing vocals, engineering, drum programming; additional bass guitar (3)
- Steve Price – bass guitar (6)

Technical

- Jerry Kandiah – engineering
- Santi Arribas – engineering
- Clive Godard – engineering
- Simon Gogerly – mixing
- Mazed Murad – mastering
- Leigh Smiler – design
- Matt Domino – facilitator

== Release history ==
Country	Date	Label
United States	24 February 2015	Metropolis Records
United Kingdom	2 March 2015	Membran
