= Kevin Dettmar =

American cultural critic

Kevin J. H. Dettmar (December 24, 1958) is an American cultural critic who specializes in British and Irish modern literature and contemporary popular music. He is the W.M. Keck Professor of English at Pomona College and the Director of the college's Humanities Studio.
