= Shrinkwrapped (album) =

Studio album by Gang of Four
- Released: 1995
- Genres: Post-punk; funk rock
- Length: 39:06
- Label: Castle Communications
- Producer: Andy Gill

Gang of Four chronology
| Mall (1991) | Shrinkwrapped (1995) | 100 Flowers Bloom (1998) |

Professional ratings
Review scores
| Source | Rating |
|---|---|
| AllMusic | 3/5 stars |
| Robert Christgau | (neither) |

Shrinkwrapped is the sixth studio album by Gang of Four. It was released in 1995 on Castle Communications. Some of the songs are featured on the Peter Hall film, Delinquent.

== Critical reception ==
Trouser Press wrote that the album "never overcomes the disappointment of hearing such former iconoclasts flaunt fairly conventional music, lyrics and (courtesy of Gill) production values."

== Track listing ==
All tracks composed by Andy Gill and Jon King; except where indicated

1. "Tattoo" – 4:08
2. "Sleepwalker" 3:30
3. "I Parade Myself" – 4:10
4. "Unburden" (Gill) – 3:13
5. "Better Him Than Me" – 3:49
6. "Something 99" – 2:49
7. "Showtime, Valentine" – 4:42
8. "Unburden Unbound" (Gill) – 2:45
9. "The Dark Ride" – 3:35
10. "I Absolve You" – 4:04
11. "Shrinkwrapped" – 3:25

== Personnel ==
- Andy Gill – guitar, vocals, (bass on some tracks?)
- Jon King – vocals
- Phil Butcher – bass on tracks 1, 3 and 9
- Dean Garcia – bass on tracks 2 and 6
- Steve Monti – drums on tracks 1, 3–5, 7, 9 and 11
- Dave Axford – drums on tracks 2 and 6
- Catherine Mayer – sex worker vocal on track 4

Technical

- Andy Gill, Jon King – front cover artwork concept
- Andy Gill, Hugh Gilmour – design
