= Sara Lee (musician) =

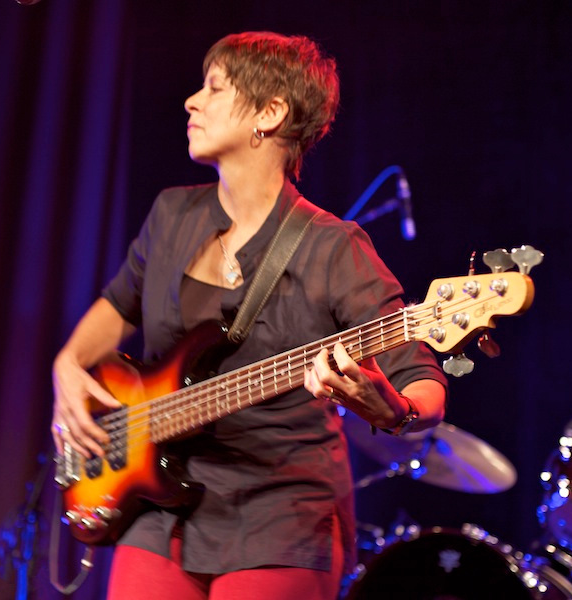
- Lee performing in 2010

Background information
- Born: 1955 or 1956 (age 69–70)
- Genres: Alternative rock; art rock; pop rock; post-punk
- Occupation: Musician
- Instrument: Bass
- Years active: 1975–present
- Formerly of: Gang of Four; The League of Gentlemen

Sara Lee (born 1955 or 1956) is an English bassist and singer-songwriter, who came to prominence when replacing Dave Allen on bass guitar in the post-punk band Gang of Four, of which she was a member from 1982 to 1984. She was also a member of Robert Fripp's short-lived band The League of Gentlemen and is also notable for work with the B-52s, Ani DiFranco, and Indigo Girls. As of October 2021, Lee rejoined Gang of Four with founding members Hugo Burnham and Jon King as well as David Pajo, to tour in 2022.

== Biography ==
Lee confirmed in an interview on Rundgrenradio.com that Sara Lee is her birth name. Born in the West Midlands, England, Lee's entire family was musical. Both parents were music teachers (her father was latterly a bass song man in the choir of York Minster), her sister a cellist, and her brother a trombone player. Music formed an important part of her childhood. She played tympani and double bass in school and local orchestras as a teenager, until the day she discovered the electric bass guitar.

After playing with a couple of local bands, she moved to London and worked as a secretary at Polydor Records. Here she was discovered by King Crimson leader Robert Fripp, who was encouraged to stay at a show to see "a girl who works in the office". Fripp invited her to join his band, The League of Gentlemen.

Lee went on to work with Robyn Hitchcock on his album Groovy Decay, and recorded two albums with the Gang of Four in England. Later she moved to the United States. Lee became a sought-after session, concert and recording artist, playing with the Thompson Twins, before she crossed paths with The B-52's during the recording of their Cosmic Thing album, and can be seen in the "Love Shack" and the "Roam" videos. Following a stint on the Cosmic tour, Lee formed the Raging Hormones with B-52 session drummer Charley Drayton. She then started a seven-year run with the Indigo Girls, contributing "sterling performances". In 1996 and 1997, she accompanied singer-songwriter Ani DiFranco on tours of Europe and North America, as documented on the double-live album Living in Clip.

Lee has played with many other artists, including Joan Osborne, Ryuichi Sakamoto and Fiona Apple, and is a close friend of former David Bowie bassist Gail Ann Dorsey. Lee re-joined the B-52's as a touring member in 1999. On 12 September 2000, she released her debut solo album Make It Beautiful on Difranco's Righteous Babe records. Lee recorded instrumental tracks, which were sent to musicians with whom she had previously worked to provide lyrics, including Ani DiFranco, Emily Saliers of the Indigo Girls, Pal Shazar, Barbara Gogan of The Passions and Kristen Hall. She replaced Rachel Haden for the final dates of Todd Rundgren's 2009 Arena tour.

Lee was also a judge for the fifth annual Independent Music Awards to support independent artists' careers.

Lee rejoined Gang of Four with founding members Hugo Burnham and Jon King as well as David Pajo, to tour in 2022. In January 2023, a US show was announced, where the band played at the Cruel World Festival in Pasadena, California, on 20 May 2023.
