= Entertainment! =

Studio album by Gang of Four
- Released: 25 September 1979
- Recorded: 1979
- Studios: The Workhouse, Old Kent Road, London
- Genres: Post-punk; dance-punk; art punk; funk-punk
- Length: 39:53
- Labels: EMI; Warner Bros.
- Producers: Andy Gill; Jon King; Rob Warr

Gang of Four chronology
Entertainment! (1979)	Yellow EP (1980)

Singles from Entertainment!
- 1. "Damaged Goods" Released: 13 October 1978; 2. "At Home He's a Tourist" Released: 1979

Entertainment! is the debut album by the English post-punk band Gang of Four. It was released in September 1979 through EMI Records internationally and Warner Bros. Records in North America. Stylistically, it draws heavily on punk rock but also incorporates the influence of funk, reggae and dub. Its lyrics and artwork reflected the band's left-wing political concerns. Entertainment! became a seminal album in the post-punk movement.

In 2020, Entertainment! was ranked at number 273 on Rolling Stone magazine's list of the "500 Greatest Albums of All Time".

== Music ==
Entertainment! has been recognised as a seminal post-punk album, and an example of dance-punk, art punk and funk-punk. The album was co-produced by Jon King and Andy Gill along with Rob Warr, the band's manager at the time. King's lyrics were heavily influenced by Situationism, the work of philosophers Michel Foucault and Jacques Lacan, feminism, and Marx's theory of alienation; a unifying notion is that "the personal is political". Topics include commodification ("Natural's Not in It", "Return the Gift"), proletarian life ("At Home He's a Tourist"), great man theory ("Not Great Men"), the treatment of Special Category Status prisoners at Long Kesh during The Troubles ("Ether"), and the cognitive and moral dissonance of watching media images of terrorism and guerrilla warfare in distant conflicts ("5.45"). A number of songs apply these themes to subvert love song tropes, challenging traditional concepts of love ("Love Like Anthrax", "Contract") and sex ("Damaged Goods", "I Found That Essence Rare"). In his 2014 monograph on the album, Kevin J. H. Dettmar likens the album to James Joyce's Ulysses, saying: "both are concerned with the importance of narrative, of storytelling, as a mode of experiencing the world... that the stories we tell ourselves about 'the way things are'—a body of stories that in another context we might call ideology—profoundly shape our experiences of the world."

== Artwork ==
The album's cover artwork, designed by King, shows the influence of the Situationist International, a left-wing organization which became famous for inspiring the events of May 68 in France. It depicts an "Indian" shaking hands with a "cowboy" in three heavily processed versions of the same image, based on a still from one of the Winnetou films starring Lex Barker and Pierre Brice, which had once been popular in East Germany as narratives critical of capitalism. Their faces are reduced to blobs of red and white: that is, to their stereotypical skin colours. A text that winds around the images reads: "The Indian smiles, he thinks that the cowboy is his friend. The cowboy smiles, he is glad the Indian is fooled. Now he can exploit him." In this way, it approaches themes of exploitation, but may also criticize simplistic popular depictions of ethnic, social or political conflicts as "cowboys and Indians".

The album's back cover depicts a family whose father says, "I spend most of our money on myself so that I can stay fat", while the mother and children declare, "We're grateful for his leftovers". On the album's inner sleeve, designed by Gill, small photographs depicting scenes shown on television are interlaced with text illustrating what the band suggests are the misleading subtexts of media presentation: "The facts are presented neutrally so that the public can make up its own mind"; "Men act heroically to defend their country"; "People are given what they want".

== Release ==
"At Home He's a Tourist" reached number 58 in the UK Singles Chart, the highest position of any Gang of Four song. The band were originally asked to perform the song on Top of the Pops. However, when the show's producers heard the line "And the rubbers you hide in your top left pocket" they asked the group to change the word "rubbers" to "rubbish" for fear of causing offence; the band refused, and the appearance was cancelled.

In 2005, the band performed the album live in its entirety as part of the All Tomorrow's Parties-curated Don't Look Back concert series. In 2009, King wrote a track-by-track commentary on the album for Clash. Hugo Burnham's memories of making the album were published in 2014, on the 35th anniversary of its release.

== Reception ==
Professional ratings
Review scores
Source	Rating
AllMusic	5/5 stars
Blender	5/5 stars
Christgau's Record Guide	A
Encyclopedia of Popular Music	5/5 stars
Entertainment Weekly	A+
Pitchfork	9.5/10
Q	5/5 stars
Record Mirror	5/5 stars
Rolling Stone	4.5/5 stars
The Rolling Stone Album Guide	5/5 stars
Spin Alternative Record Guide	10/10

Entertainment! was ranked the fifth best album of 1979 by NME. Reviewing the album in Rolling Stone in 1980, David Fricke regarded Entertainment! as "the best debut album by a British band – punk or otherwise – since the original English release of The Clash in 1977". Creem's RJ Smith, looking back on Entertainment! in 1984, found it to be "the most difficult Gang album, because it's so damn hard to find the front door to the thing. The ugly emotions Entertainment! dredges up are almost freakish, and all the more unsettling for the way they poke unexpectedly through the record's detached, architectonic front."

In 2003, Rolling Stone ranked the album at number 490 on its list of the "500 Greatest Albums of All Time", raising the album's rank to number 483 in their 2012 update of the list, saying that its "stiff, jerky aggression... invented a new style that influenced bands from the Minutemen to LCD Soundsystem". In their 2020 reboot of the list, Rolling Stone ranked the album number 273. In 2004, Pitchfork listed Entertainment! as the eighth best album of the 1970s.

In March 2005, Q placed the track "At Home He's a Tourist" at number 52 on its list of the "100 Greatest Guitar Tracks". As of 2009, Entertainment! has sold more than 100,000 copies in the UK. The album was also included in the book 1001 Albums You Must Hear Before You Die.

In 2016, Paste Magazine named the album as the sixth-best post-punk album of all time. Staff writer Robert Ham said: "At the time of its release, there weren’t many other groups who could pay lip service to Fela Kuti and Siouxsie & The Banshees in the same breath, let alone find a way to stitch those two disparate aesthetics together in any meaningful way. And while this Leeds-based quartet never quite lived up to the foundation-cracking urgency of Entertainment!, their debut album has long since provided a crash course in the post-punk aesthetic where dub and funk find equal footing with minimalism and fury-driven rock topped with lyrics that denounced consumer culture, the salacious press, and the nature of pop music."

Writing for the BBC in 2024, Thomas Hobbs called Entertainment! "the most blistering debut album of all time", describing it as "a revolutionary mix of abrasive guitar and subversive societal observations". He said that the lyrics of songs such as "Natural's Not In It" were "positively prescient".

The album has also attracted praise from rock musicians. Kurt Cobain of Nirvana listed it as one of his 50 favourite albums of all time. Flea of the Red Hot Chili Peppers stated that the first time he heard the record, "It completely changed the way [he] looked at rock music and sent [him] on [his] trip as a bass player." Michael Stipe of R.E.M. has stated, "Gang of Four could really swing. I stole a lot from them."

== Use in other media ==
"Natural's Not in It" plays over the title sequence of the 2006 film Marie Antoinette. In 2010, Microsoft used it in advertisements for the Kinect.

"Love Like Anthrax" was used in the 2004 remake of The Manchurian Candidate and in the 1986 film Dogs in Space, which featured Michael Hutchence in the lead role; Hutchence cited Gang of Four as a major influence on his band INXS. In 2016, Frank Ocean would sample the song on "Futura Free" from the album Blonde.

In 2014, Kevin J. H. Dettmar wrote a monograph on the album for Bloomsbury's 33⅓ series.

"Damaged Goods" appears on the soundtracks to the video games Mat Hoffman's Pro BMX 2 and Tony Hawk's Pro Skater 3+4.

== Track listing ==
All tracks are written by Gang of Four (Dave Allen, Hugo Burnham, Andy Gill and Jon King).

Side one
No.	Title	Length
1.	"Ether"	3:52
2.	"Natural's Not in It"	3:09
3.	"Not Great Men"	3:08
4.	"Damaged Goods"	3:29
5.	"Return the Gift"	3:08
6.	"Guns Before Butter"	3:49

Side two
No.	Title	Length
1.	"I Found That Essence Rare"	3:09
2.	"Glass"	2:32
3.	"Contract"	2:42
4.	"At Home He's a Tourist"	3:33
5.	"5.45"	3:48
6.	"Love Like Anthrax"	4:23
Total length:		39:53

1995 bonus tracks

EMI Records CD issue (mastered by Andy Gill and Jon King) includes the following tracks from the Yellow EP:

1. "Outside the Trains Don't Run on Time" – 3:27
2. "He'd Send in the Army" – 3:40
3. "It's Her Factory" – 3:08

Infinite Zero Archive/American Recordings CD issue includes the remaining track from the Yellow EP:

1. "Armalite Rifle" – 2:48

2005 bonus tracks

In addition to the Yellow EP, the Rhino release adds four previously unissued tracks:

1. "Guns Before Butter" (alternate version) – 4:25
2. "Contract" (alternate version) – 2:48
3. "Blood Free" (live at The Electric Ballroom, London) – 3:17
4. "Sweet Jane" (live at the American Indian Center) (Lou Reed) – 3:20

== Personnel ==
Gang of Four

- Jon King – lead vocals (1–3, 7–9), co-lead vocals (1, 4–6, 10, 12), backing vocals (11), melodica (1, 3, 11), art design
- Andy Gill – electric guitar, lead vocals (11), co-lead vocals (1, 4–6, 10, 12), backing vocals (2, 3, 7–9), art design
- Dave Allen – bass guitar, backing vocals (3, 5, 7, 12)
- Hugo Burnham – drums

Technical personnel

- Edwin Cross – tape operator
- Davy Phee – tape operator
- Rik Walton – engineer

== Charts ==
Album

Chart (1979–80)	Peak position
New Zealand Albums (RMNZ)	35
UK Albums (Official Charts)	45

Singles

Year	Single	Chart	Peak
1979	"At Home He's a Tourist"	UK Singles Chart	58
1980	"Damaged Goods"/"I Found That Essence Rare"	US Billboard Dance Club Songs	39
