= Content (Gang of Four album) =

Studio album by Gang of Four
- Released: 24 January 2011
- Recorded: 2009–2010
- Studios: Beauchamp Building, London
- Genre: Alternative rock
- Length: 35:04
- Labels: Grönland Records (EU) / Yep Roc Records (US)
- Producer: Andy Gill

Gang of Four chronology
Return the Gift (2005)	Content (2011)	What Happens Next (2015)

Professional ratings
Aggregate scores
Source	Rating
Metacritic	71/100
Review scores
Source	Rating
AllMusic	2.5/5 stars
The A.V. Club	B−
The Daily Telegraph	5/5 stars
NME	8/10
Pitchfork Media	6.8/10
PopMatters	6/10
Q	4/5 stars
Rolling Stone	2.5/5 stars
Spin	7/10
Tiny Mix Tapes	2/5 marks

Content is the seventh full-length studio album by English band Gang of Four, released on 24 January 2011 on Grönland Records in Europe and the following day on Yep Roc Records in the US. It was the last Gang of Four album to feature original vocalist Jon King. It was recorded at Andy Gill's central London studio, The Beauchamp Building.

== Track listing ==
All tracks composed by Andy Gill and Jon King

No.	Title	Length
1.	"She Said 'You Made a Thing of Me'"	3:49
2.	"You Don't Have to Be Mad"	3:15
3.	"Who Am I?"	3:34
4.	"I Can't Forget Your Lonely Face"	3:56
5.	"You'll Never Pay for the Farm"	3:52
6.	"I Party All the Time"	3:42
7.	"A Fruitfly in the Beehive"	3:44
8.	"It Was Never Gonna Turn Out Too Good"	2:48
9.	"Do As I Say"	3:26
10.	"I Can See from Far Away"	2:58

== Personnel ==
Gang of Four

- Jon King – vocals, melodica
- Andy Gill – guitar, vocals
- Thomas McNeice – bass
- Mark Heaney – drums

with:

- Eddi Reader – backing vocals

Technical

- Andy Gill, Sam Morton – engineer
- Andy Gill, Jon King – artwork
- Christian McGowan – CGI cover image
