= Frank Tontoh =

Ghanaian musician (born 1964)

- Born: 22 May 1964 (age 61); Kumasi, Ghana
- Occupation: Drummer

Frank Tontoh (born 22 May 1964) is a Ghanaian percussionist.

== Life and work ==
Born into the world of music, his father being trumpeter Mac Tontoh, Frank began his musical studies at MIT in Los Angeles. Afterwards, he completed a degree in composition and arranging with school friend and fellow musician Courtney Pine at Trinity College London.

In 1982, Tontoh toured with his father's band Osibisa, touring the world for four years. On returning to London in 1986, he formed the Jazz Warriors with Pine, the first of many bands he would become associated with. The friends also appeared as part of the jazz quartet in the first instalment of Doctor Who's twenty-fifth anniversary special Silver Nemesis.

Afterwards, Tontoh went on to form his own band, Desperately Seeking Fusion. He has worked for, and performed with, many others including Aztec Camera, Level 42, Tasmin Archer, Jason Donovan, Gary Barlow, Des'ree, Mis-Teeq and Gabrielle among others. In 1996, he worked with George Michael on his MTV Unplugged concert which led to Michael's Songs from the Last Century album in 1999. In 2000, Tontoh worked as a drummer and musical director for Craig David. He also recorded and toured with Amy Winehouse on her Back to Black tour.

More recently, Tontoh appeared as part of the band in the 2016 film Genius. Since 2012, he has been a drummer in funk and soul band Brother Strut.
