= Happy Now (Gang of Four album) =

Studio album by Gang of Four
- Released: 19 April 2019
- Genre: Art punk
- Length: 40:21
- Language: English
- Label: Gillmusic
- Producer: Andy Gill; Ben Hillier; Catherine Mayer; Ross Orton

Gang of Four chronology
Complicit EP (2018)	Happy Now (2019)

Happy Now is the ninth studio album by English post-punk band Gang of Four, self-released on 19 April 2019, and their most recent album as of 2025. The release has received mildly positive reviews. It is the band's final album before the 2020 death of guitarist Andy Gill, who was then the only original band member, although in 2021 Gang of Four re-united with two of the four original band members.

== Critical reception ==
According to the review aggregator Metacritic, Happy Now received "generally favorable reviews" based on a weighted average score of 67 out of 100 from seven critic scores. The editorial staff of AllMusic Guide gave the album four out of five stars, with reviewer Mark Deming writing, "this is taut, effective music that honors Gang of Four's heritage but succeeds on its own terms". In Under the Radar, Mischa Pearlman's review praises the music's social and political relevance, giving it a seven out of 10.

== Track listing ==
All songs written by Andy Gill, except where noted:

1. "Toreador" – 3:34
2. "Alpha Male" – 4:33
3. "One True Friend" – 4:24
4. "Ivanka: 'My Name's on It'" – 3:52
5. "Don't Ask Me" (Andy Gill, John "Gaoler" Sterry) – 3:41
6. "Change the Locks" (Andy Gill, Catherine Mayer) – 4:07
7. "I'm a Liar" – 4:09
8. "White Lies" (Andy Gill, Catherine Mayer) – 3:43
9. "Paper Thin" (Andy Gill, Catherine Mayer) – 3:38
10. "Lucky" – 4:40

== Personnel ==
Gang of Four

- Andy Gill – guitar, vocals, production, artwork
- Tobias Humble – drums on "Toreador", "Ivanka: 'My Name's on It'" and "Lucky"
- Thomas McNeice – bass guitar on "Alpha Male", "One True Friend", "Change the Locks", "I am a Liar" and "Paper Thin"

Additional personnel

- Natalie Alexis Duncan – backing vocals on "Lucky"
- Lawrie Dunster – mastering
- Jonny Finnigan – drums on "Alpha Male", "Change the Locks" and "Paper Thin"
- Ben Hillier – bass guitar on "Toreador", mixing on "Toreador" and "Lucky", production on "Toreador", "Ivanka: 'My Name's on It'" and "Lucky"
- Amy Love – backing vocals on "Alpha Male", "One True Friend", "Ivanka: 'My Name's on It'" and "White Lies"
- Catherine Mayer – mixing on "One True Friend", "Change the Locks", "White Lies" and "Paper Thin"; production on "One True Friend", "Change the Locks", "White Lies" and "Paper Thin"
- Rhys Oakes – programming on "Alpha Male" and "Ivanka: 'My Name's on It'"
- Ross Orton – bass guitar on "Don't Ask Me"; mixing on "Alpha Male", "Ivanka: 'My Name's on It'" and "I'm a Liar"; production on "I'm a Liar"
- Jane Sasseen – vocal sampling on "Alpha Male"
- Leigh Smiler – artwork
- Rebeka Ubuntu – backing vocals on "Lucky"
