= Andy Gill =

British guitarist and record producer (1956–2020)

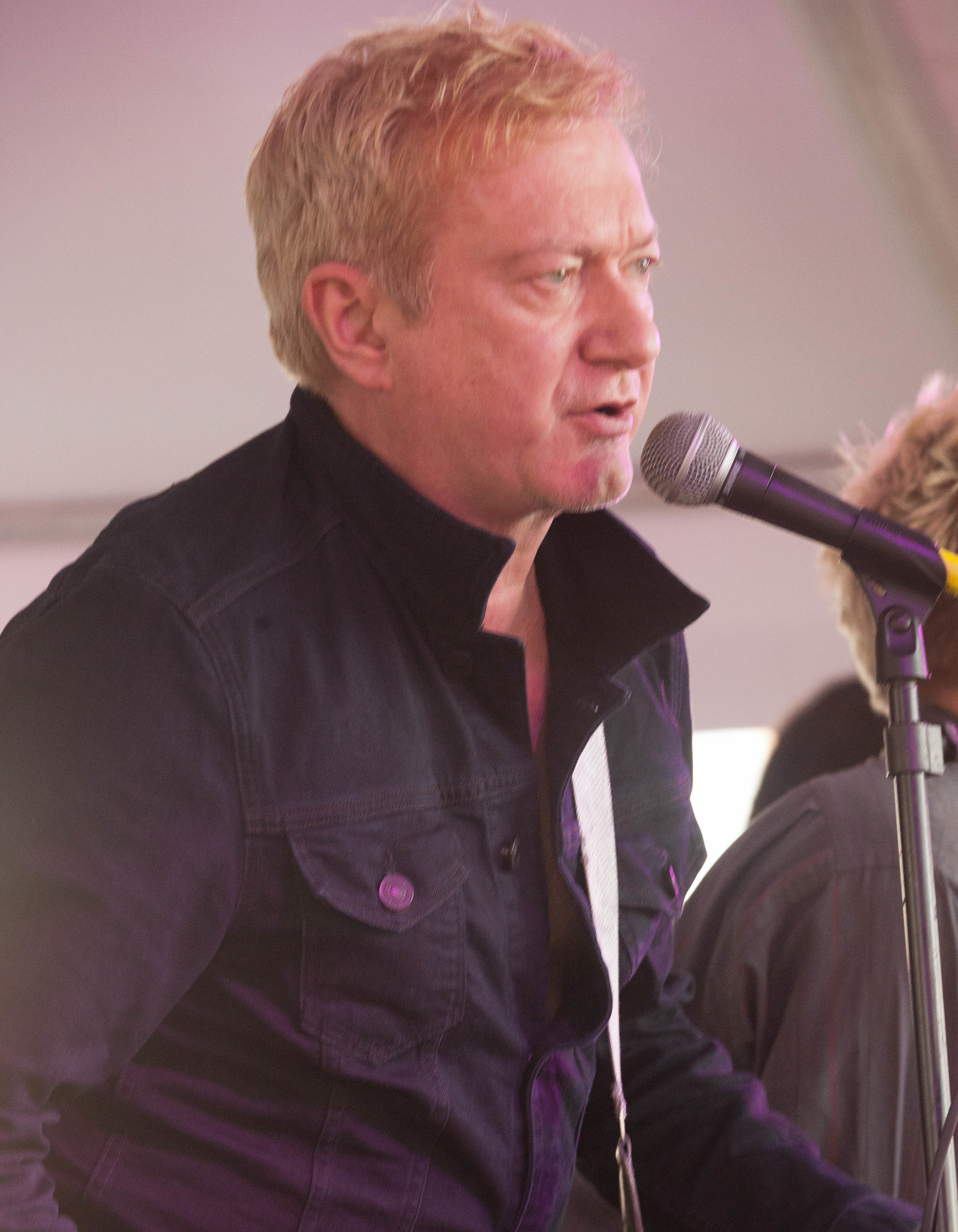
- Gill on stage with Gang of Four in 2015

Background information
- Born: Andrew James Dalrymple Gill; 1 January 1956; Manchester, England
- Died: 1 February 2020 (aged 64) London, England, United Kingdom
- Genres: Post-punk
- Occupations: Musician; record producer
- Instruments: Guitar; vocals
- Formerly of: Gang of Four
- Website: andygillmusic.com

Andrew James Dalrymple Gill (1 January 1956 – 1 February 2020) was an English musician and record producer. He was the lead guitarist for the rock band Gang of Four, which he co-founded in 1976. Gill was known for his angular, jagged style of guitar on albums such as Entertainment! (1979) and Solid Gold (1981) and hit singles such as "At Home He's a Tourist", "Damaged Goods", "Anthrax", "What We All Want" and "I Love a Man in a Uniform".

In addition to his work with Gang of Four, Gill was also a record producer, and produced or co-produced all of the band's albums. He also produced albums for artists such as the Red Hot Chili Peppers, the Jesus Lizard, the Stranglers, the Futureheads, Michael Hutchence, Killing Joke, Polysics, Fight Like Apes, Therapy? and the Young Knives.

Gill was noted for a distinctive rhythm guitar style and sound, emphasizing a treble-heavy attack likened by one critic to "metal splintering." He favoured tight linkage with drums and bass, and unlike many guitarists shunned the "warmer" sound of valve amplifiers in favour of the "coldness" and "thinness" of a Fender Stratocaster through transistor amps.

== Personal life ==
Gill was born in Manchester, England, on 1 January 1956. He was married to Catherine Mayer, a journalist and the co-founder of the Women's Equality Party.

Gill was often mistaken for the journalist and music critic Andy Gill (1953–2019), who began his career at the NME in 1977 and was chief music critic of The Independent from 1990.

== Death ==
Gill's death was announced by Gang of Four on 1 February 2020. He was 64. A band's spokesman told The New York Times that the cause of death was listed as multiple organ failure and pneumonia. On 14 May 2020, following a hospital investigation, his widow Catherine Mayer concluded that Gill was an early victim of the COVID-19 pandemic, following a music tour to China in November 2019.

== Discography ==
=== Solo ===
- "Dispossession" 12-inch single (1987), Survival

=== Production credits ===
- Gang of Four – Entertainment! (1979)
- Gang of Four – Another Day/Another Dollar (1982)
- Red Hot Chili Peppers – The Red Hot Chili Peppers (1984)
- Balancing Act – "Curtains" (1988)
- Gang of Four – Mall (1991)
- The Jesus Lizard – Blue (1998)
- Michael Hutchence - Michael Hutchence (1999)
- Bis – Social Dancing (1999)
- The Mark of Cain – This is This... (2001, co-produced with Phil McKellar)
- Regurgitator – Eduardo and Rodriguez Wage War on T-Wrecks (2001 – co-produced with the band, mixing, programming & arrangements)
- Killing Joke – Killing Joke (2003)
- The Futureheads – The Futureheads (2004)
- Young Knives – Voices of Animals and Men (2006)
- Therapy? – Crooked Timber (2009)
- Fight Like Apes – The Body of Christ and the Legs of Tina Turner (2010)
- Gang of Four – Content (2011)
- Gang of Four – What Happens Next (2015)
- Gang of Four – Happy Now (2019)
- Queenadreena – Djin reissue (2021, "Heaven Doesn't Wait" demo)
