= Gang of Four (band) =

English rock band

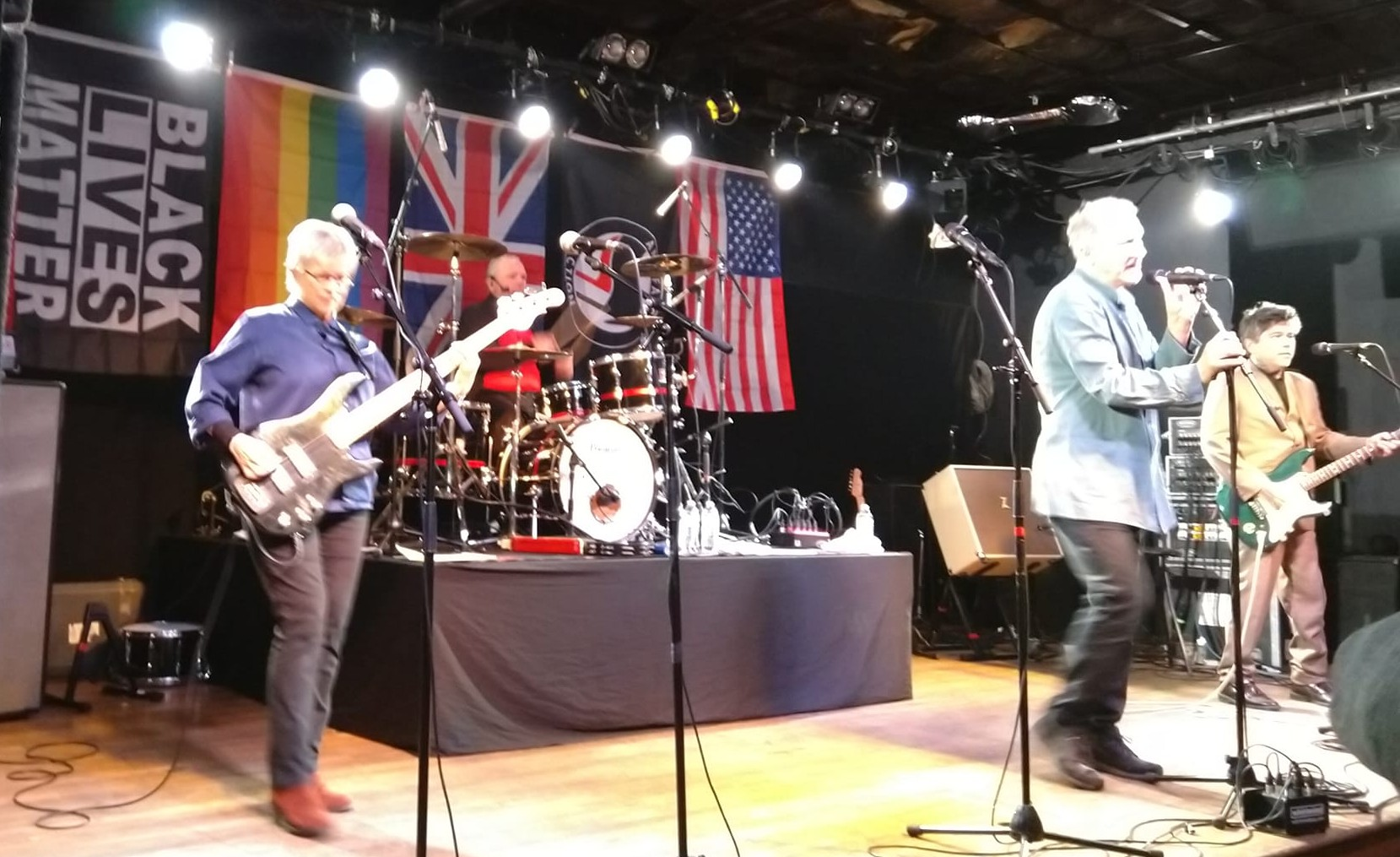
- Gang of Four at the Bottom Lounge, Chicago, in 2022; L-R: Sara Lee, Hugo Burnham, Jon King, David Pajo

Background information
- Origin: Leeds, England
- Genres: Post-punk; dance-punk; funk rock
- Years active: 1976–1984; 1990–1991; 1993; 1995; 2004–2020; 2021–present
- Labels: EMI; Warner Bros.; Polydor; V2; Matador
- Members: Jon King; Hugo Burnham; Ted Leo; Gail Greenwood
- Past members: See Band members
- Website: gangoffour.uk = facebook.com/gangoffour/

Gang of Four are an English post-punk band, formed in 1976 in the city of Leeds, West Yorkshire, England, United Kingdom.

The original members were singer Jon King, guitarist Andy Gill, drummer Hugo Burnham, and bass guitarist Dave Allen. There have been many different line-ups including, among other notable musicians, Sara Lee, Gail Ann Dorsey, Mark Heaney and David Pajo. After a brief lull in the 1980s, different constellations of the band recorded two studio albums in the 1990s. Between 2004 and 2006 the original line-up reunited; Gill toured using the name between 2012 and his death in 2020.

In 2021, the band announced that King, Burnham, and Sara Lee would be reuniting for a US tour in 2022 with David Pajo on guitar. They continued to perform live, including at the Cruel World Festival in Pasadena, California; headlining Luna Fest in Coimbra, Portugal, and a UK Tour in October 2023. They then announced that their "Long Goodbye" tour in 2025 would be their last headlining tour of the US and Europe. For this tour, King and Burnham were joined by Ted Leo on guitar and Gail Greenwood on bass.

The band play a stripped-down mix of punk rock, funk and dub, with a lyrical emphasis on the social and political ills of society. Gang of Four are widely considered one of the leading bands of the late 1970s/early 1980s post-punk movement. Their debut album, Entertainment!, was ranked by Rolling Stone as the fifth greatest punk album of all time and at number 483 in their list of the 500 Greatest Albums of All Time. In 2004, the album was listed by Pitchfork Media as the 8th best album of the 1970s and, in 2020, by Pop Matters as "Best Post Punk album ever". Entertainment! continues to be influential, and was voted 49th in Rolling Stones' 2023 poll of "100 Best Debut Albums of All time". Their early 80s albums (Songs of the Free and Hard) found them softening some of their more jarring qualities, and drifting towards dance-punk and disco. David Fricke of Rolling Stone described Gang of Four as "probably the best politically motivated band in rock & roll."

== History ==
=== Early years and Entertainment! (1976–1979) ===
The band initially consisted of vocalist Jon King, guitarist Andy Gill, drummer Hugo Burnham and bass guitarist Dave Wolfson. After two gigs, Wolfson was replaced by Dave Allen.

Gang of Four's music brought together an eclectic array of influences, ranging from the Frankfurt School of social criticism to the increasingly clear trans-Atlantic punk consensus. Gang of Four was named by Andy Corrigan, a member of the Mekons, while driving around with Gill and King when he spotted a newspaper billboard on the intra-Party coup against China's "Gang of Four", the joke being that King's name was a pun for Jiang Qing.

The band's debut single, "Damaged Goods" backed with "(Love Like) Anthrax" and "Armalite Rifle", was recorded in June 1978 and released on 10 December 1978, on Edinburgh's Fast Product label. It was a Number 1 indie chart hit and John Peel radio show favourite. "Damaged Goods" was voted one of the 100 Greatest debut singles of all time in 2020's Rolling Stone Poll Two Peel radio sessions followed, which, with their incendiary live performances, propelled the band to international attention and sold-out shows across Europe and North America. They were then signed by EMI Records. The group's debut single with this label, "At Home He's a Tourist", charted in 1979. Invited to appear on top rated BBC music program Top of the Pops, the band walked off the show when the BBC told them to sing "rubbish" in the place of the original lyric "rubbers", as the original line was considered too risqué. The single was then banned by BBC Radio and TV, which lost the band some support at EMI. King's lyrics were always controversial and a later single, "I Love a Man in a Uniform", was banned by the BBC during the Falklands War in 1982.

Critic Stewart Mason has called "Anthrax" not only the group's "most notorious song" but also "one of the most unique and interesting songs of its time". It's also a good example of Gang of Four's social perspective: after a minute-long, droning, feedback-laced guitar intro, the rhythm section sets up a funky, churning beat, and the guitar drops out entirely. In one stereo channel, King sings a "post-punk anti-love song", comparing himself to a beetle trapped on its back ("and there's no way for me to get up") and equating love with "a case of anthrax, and that's some thing I don't want to catch." Meanwhile, in the other stereo channel (and slightly less prominent in the mix), Gill reads (on the original EP version) a detailed account of the technical resources used on the song, which on the re-recorded album version is replaced by a deadpan monologue about public perception of love and the prevalence of love songs in popular music: "Love crops up quite a lot as something to sing about 'cause most groups make most of their songs about falling in love, or how happy they are to be in love; and you occasionally wonder why these groups do sing about it all the time." Although the two sets of lyrics tell independent stories they occasionally synchronise for emphasis.

According to critic Paul Morley, "The Gang spliced the ferocious precision of Dr. Feelgood's working-class blues with the testing avant-garde intrigue of Henry Cow. Wilfully avoiding structural obviousness, melodic prettiness and harmonic corniness, the Gang's music was studded with awkward holes and sharp corners." At the time, the band was recognised to be doing something very different from other white guitar acts. Ken Tucker, in Rolling Stone, 1980, wrote: "...rarely have the radical edges of black and white music come closer to overlapping... the Gang of Four utilize their bass guitar every bit as prominently and starkly as the curt bass figures that prod the spoken verses in (Kurtis Blow's "culture defining" huge summer hit) "The Breaks."

=== Later years (1980–1983) ===
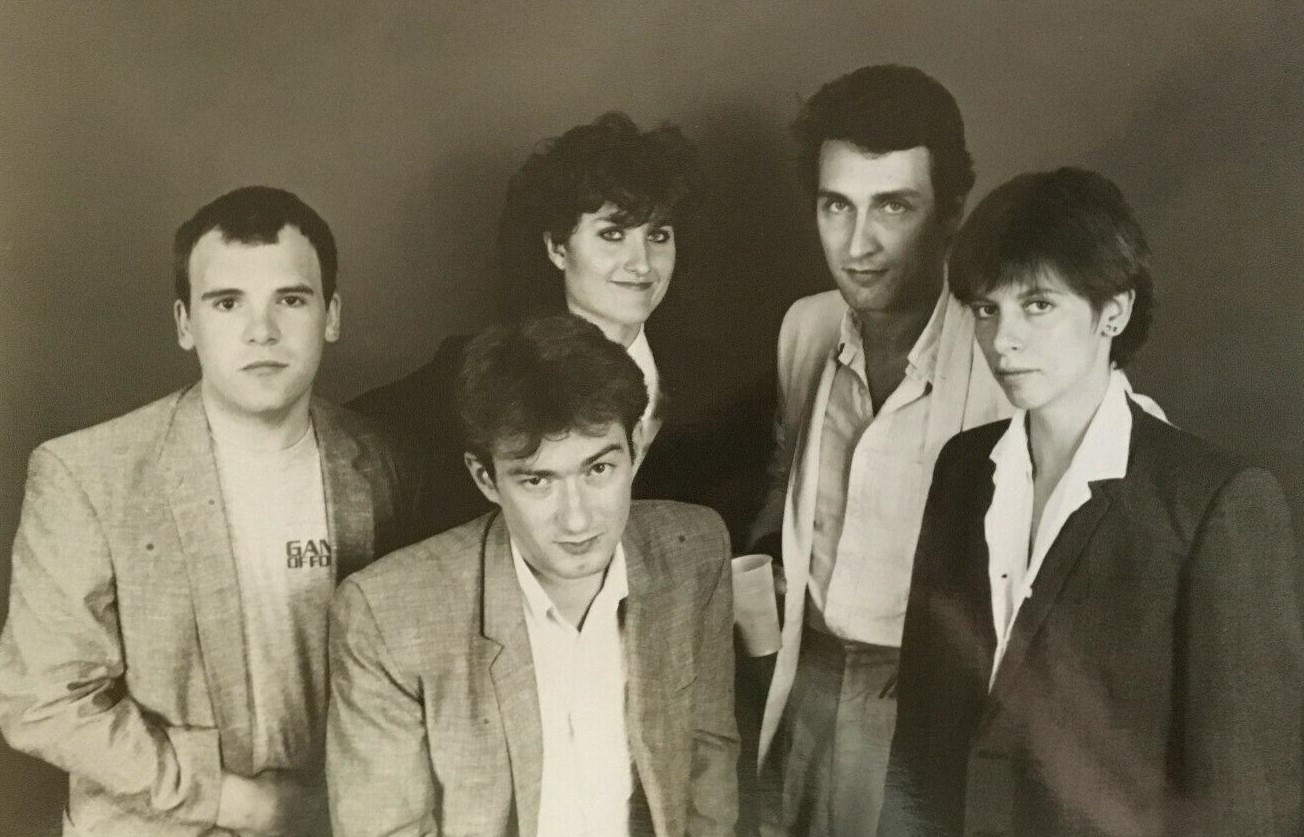
Gang of Four in 1982 (publicity photo)

In 1981 the band released their second LP, Solid Gold. Like Entertainment!, the album was uncompromising, spare, and analytical. King's lyrics in such songs as "Cheeseburger", "He'd Send in the Army" and "In the Ditch" exposed the paradoxes of warfare, work and leisure. Van Gosse, in a Village Voice review said: "Gang of Four embody a new category in pop, which illuminates all the others, because the motor of their aesthetic is not a 'personal creative vision.'"

Dave Allen (who later co-founded Shriekback, King Swamp, Low Pop Suicide and the Elastic Purejoy) left in 1981, and was briefly replaced by Busta "Cherry" Jones, a sometime player with Parliament, Brian Eno and Talking Heads. After working with Gang of Four to complete their North American tour, Jones left and was replaced by Sara Lee, who had been bassist in Robert Fripp's the League of Gentlemen. Lee was as good a singer as bassist, and she helped give the band's third studio album, Songs of the Free, a more commercially accessible element. Although "I Love a Man in a Uniform" from the album was arguably the band's most radio-friendly song, it was banned in the UK shortly after its release because Britain went to war in the Falkland Islands. In the spring of 1983, Burnham left the band after the release of Songs of the Free and formed Illustrated Man. Gill, King and Lee continued Gang of Four, releasing Hard in 1983.

After that, the band broke up, and Lee moved to the United States where she has worked with a number of artists, including The B-52's, Ryuichi Sakamoto, and Ani DiFranco.

1986 saw the release of The Peel Sessions, a collection of rawly rendered material recorded during the period 1979 to 1981 for British radio BBC. Melody Maker dubbed the album "a perfect and classic nostalgia trip into the world of gaunt cynicism."

=== Gill and King reunion (1987–1997) ===
Gill and King reunited to record Mall in 1991, and finally Shrinkwrapped in 1995. Mall featured Gail Ann Dorsey, later famous for her longtime association with David Bowie, on bass.

=== Changing line-ups (2004–2012) ===
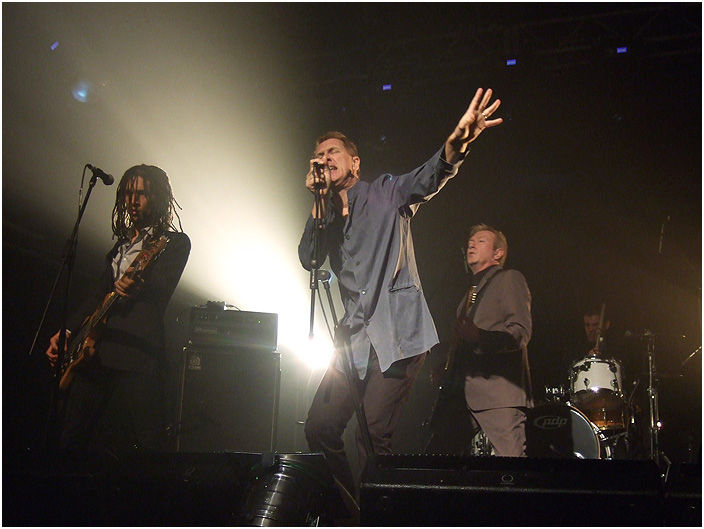
Gang of Four at Heaven, London in 2011

The original lineup of Jon King, Andy Gill, Hugo Burnham, and Dave Allen reformed in November 2004. A UK tour in January 2005, shows in Europe and Japan, and tours of the United States in May/June and again in September cemented their fierce live reputation. In October 2005, Gang of Four released a new disc featuring new recordings of songs from the albums Entertainment!, Solid Gold and Songs of the Free titled Return the Gift, accompanied by an album's worth of remixes. The album featured Mark Heaney on drums.

In January 2011, the band, now with Mark Heaney on drums who replaced Burnham in 2006, and Thomas McNeice on bass, released a new album, Content, which was called "their best record since the Seventies". Jon Pareles, in a New York Times 4-star review, declared that [the band] "have reclaimed, with a vengeance, their old attack". Following successful tours of the US, Australia and Europe in 2011, King and Gill disagreed about the band's direction and ceased working together.

=== Final line-up with Gill (2012–2020) ===
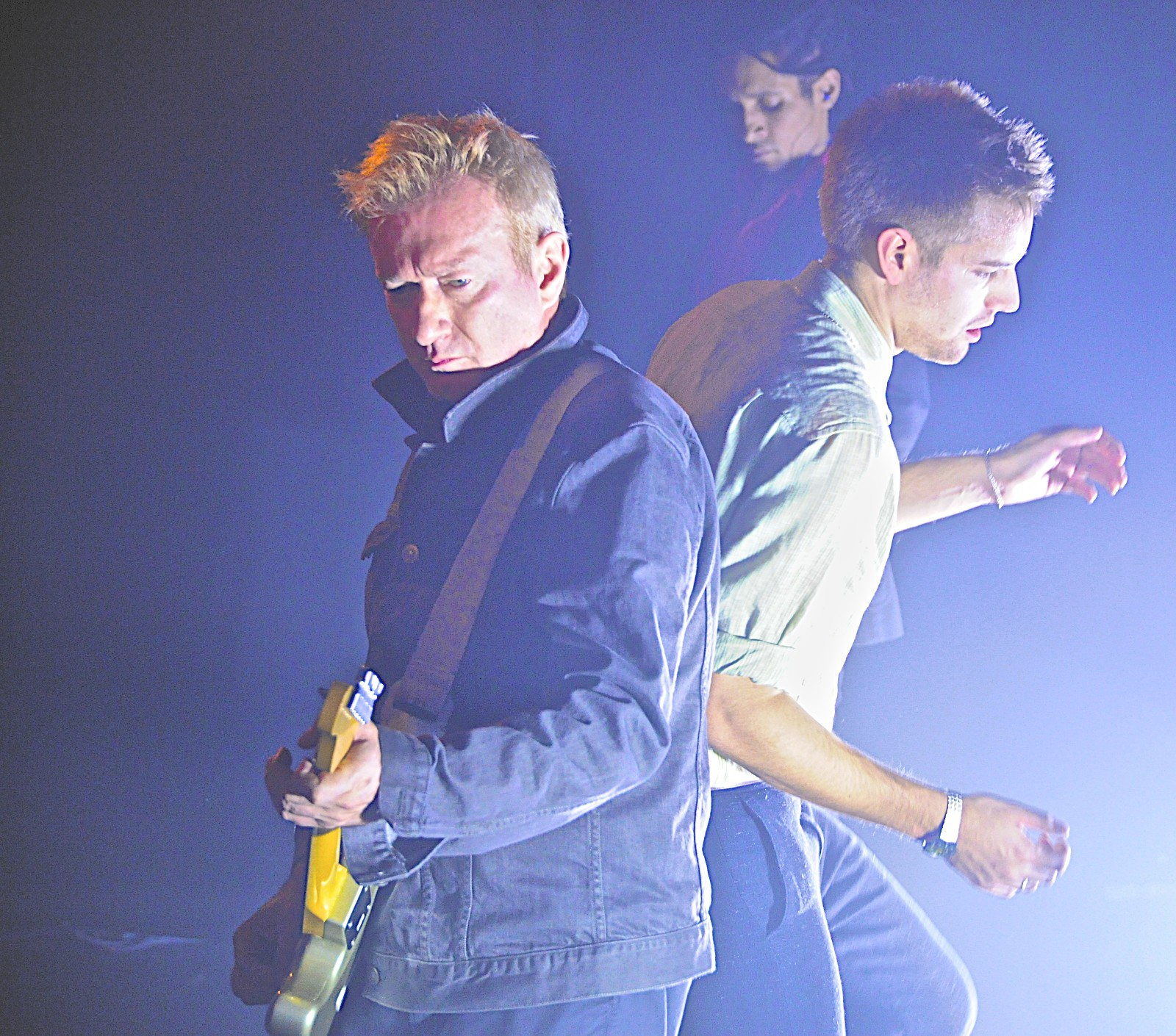
Gang of Four in 2014: Andy Gill (left) and John Sterry

Gill, against the wishes of King, continued to tour and record under the Gang of Four name. With new lead vocalist John Sterry, as well as a returning McNiece, the band released What Happens Next in 2015, Complicit in 2018, and Happy Now in 2019, which featured a range of guest artists. XSNoise said "The album [Happy Now] is as intense as any ever released on their discography."

Andy Gill died on 1 February 2020, and obituaries across the world hailed his legacy and impact. He was "one of the most influential musicians of the post-punk era, leading his band Gang of Four to huge acclaim with his intense, angular, staccato guitar work that blended rock with funk," said the Independent. Gang of Four's "brusque, angular style would directly or indirectly influence post-punk and indie-rock bands like Red Hot Chili Peppers (who chose Mr. Gill to produce their debut album), The Jesus Lizard, Nirvana, Rage Against the Machine, Franz Ferdinand and Protomartyr," said the New York Times, adding: "Michael Hutchence of INXS once said that Gang of Four’s music 'took no prisoners,' adding, 'It was art meets the devil via James Brown.'" The NME wrote: "Great musicians encapsulate their age; the very best echo endlessly onwards, and Andy Gill...has been reverberating along the baseline of alternative culture for 40 years." Two EPs, This Heaven Gives Me Migraine, and Anti Hero were released after his death featuring some final studio recordings. A tribute album, The Problem of Leisure: A Celebration of Andy Gill and Gang of Four, was released in June 2021.

=== Reunions (2021–present) ===
In October 2021, Gang of Four's social media accounts posted a photo featuring King, Burnham, Lee, and David Pajo of Slint. They later announced that this line-up would be touring in 2022 in support of the 77-81 box set. In 2022, the box-set Gang Of Four: 77-81 earned Jon King a Grammy nomination.

In 2025, the band embarked on their "Long Goodbye" Tour of the US and Europe. With both Lee and Pajo sitting it out, the tour instead featured Gail Greenwood on bass and Ted Leo on guitar. In December 2025, five months after what was believed to be their last show, the band were announced on the line-up for Wilco's Solid Sound Festival at the Massachusetts Museum of Contemporary Art in North Adams, Massachusetts. After confusion arose from their inclusion on the bill, the band took to social media to clarify that the "Long Goodbye" tour was their "last headline tour in the US and Europe", and that they would still "play a small run of select shows or a one-off event in the future".

In March 2026, the band released a new standalone single entitled "No Kings Here!". The song was penned in support of the No Kings protests across North America, and was produced by Nick Launay, who had previously worked with the band on the Another Day Another Dollar EP from 1981. It is the first new music under the Gang of Four moniker in almost six years, the first Gang of Four song to feature Jon King in 15 years, the first new Gang of Four song to feature Burnham in almost 44 years, the first ever Gang of Four song to feature Leo and Greenwood, and, most notably, the first ever Gang of Four song not to feature Andy Gill.

== Influences ==
Gang of Four have cited several bands and artists as influences, including Dr. Feelgood, Free, Jimi Hendrix, Parliament-Funkadelic, I-Roy, and U-Roy.

== Legacy ==
Gang of Four influenced a number of successful alternative acts throughout the 1980s and 1990s. R.E.M. frontman Michael Stipe cites Gang of Four as one of his band's chief influences; Flea of the Red Hot Chili Peppers has stated that Gang of Four were the single most important influence on his band's early music. Kurt Cobain, who has stated that Nirvana started as "a Gang of Four and Scratch Acid ripoff", ranked Entertainment! 13th on the list of his 50 favourite albums in his journal. Buzz Osborne of Melvins has listed Solid Gold as one of his favourite albums, adding that "I think that was a massive influence on our band – much more so than people think actually. Certainly, on our second record, Ozma. That was one of the main records we were listening to and one that probably influenced it more than most. I’ve never not listened to that record."

Andy Kellman, writing in AllMusic, argued that Gang of Four's "germs of influence" can be found in many rap metal groups "not in touch with their ancestry enough to realize it".

Other bands that have cited Gang of Four as an influence include Helmet, Band of Susans, Mission of Burma, and Saccharine Trust.

From the 2000s, the band enjoyed a resurgence in popularity, initially due to emergence of new post-punk revival bands such as Radio 4, Clinic, Liars, the Rapture, Neils Children, and then the rise of Franz Ferdinand, We Are Scientists and Bloc Party. Entertainment! continues to be influential, and was voted 49th in Rolling Stones' 2023 poll of "100 Best Debut Albums of All time"

== Band members ==
=== Current members ===
- Jon King – lead vocals, percussion, melodica (1976–1984, 1990–1991, 1993, 1995, 2004–2012, 2021–2025; 2025–present)
- Hugo Burnham – drums, backing vocals (1976–1983, 2004–2006, 2021–2025; 2025–present)
- Gail Greenwood – bass, backing vocals (2024–2025; 2025–present)
- Ted Leo – guitar, backing vocals (2025–present)

== Discography ==
- Entertainment! (1979)
- Solid Gold (1981)
- Songs of the Free (1982)
- Hard (1983)
- Mall (1991)
- Shrinkwrapped (1995)
- Return the Gift (2005)
- Content (2011)
- What Happens Next (2015)
- Happy Now (2019)
