= Hugo Burnham =

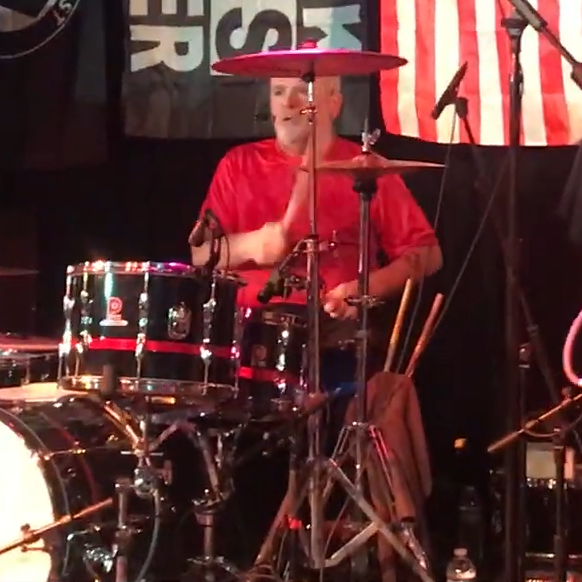
- Burnham with Gang of Four in 2022

Background information
- Born: Hugo Hamilton Mark Burnham; 25 March 1956 (age 70); St Pancras, London, England
- Genres: Post-punk
- Occupation: Musician
- Instrument: Drums

Hugo Hamilton Mark Burnham (born 25 March 1956) is an English musician, and drummer for the rock group Gang of Four.

The band formed in 1977 at the University of Leeds, where Burnham was studying English Literature. Before the band signed with EMI Records (UK, R.O.W.) and Warner Bros. Records (USA), he was a founding member of Impact Theatre Co-operative. Creem magazine's Dave DiMartino said in 1980 "Witness Hugo Burnham, a close-cropped, thickset out-and-out scary drummer who looks like his idea of fun might be pushing young American faces into old American brick walls." He continued, "watching the Gang Of Four perform at Bookie's Club 870 and realizing that as great as the records are, the band in live performance is even better. There's rhythm, always rhythm, provided by Burnham's steady drums and Dave Allen's absolutely superb funk basswork". Rolling Stone critic Greil Marcus wrote, "Hugo Burnham play(s) in an economical and precise yet propulsive style, giving the rhythm a piston-like drive."

After leaving the band in 1983, Burnham joined Illustrated Man, then worked as an occasional session drummer with Wall of Voodoo's Stan Ridgway, ABC, PiL, Nikki Sudden, and Samantha Fox, before joining his former G4 bandmate Dave Allen with Shriekback, serving as the band's manager from 1985 until 1988, when he moved from London, UK to New York City, to open an office for his company Huge & Jolly Management and Outlaw Management.

He then worked as an A&R executive with Island Records in New York, Imago Records in New York and Los Angeles, Qwest Records in Los Angeles, and EMI Music Publishing in Los Angeles. He reunited briefly with Allen to play on The Call leader Michael Been's solo album On The Verge of a Nervous Breakthrough. After leaving EMI Music, he returned to management with Deathray (featuring former members of rock group Cake, Victor Damiani and Greg Brown), then left Los Angeles for Gloucester, Massachusetts, at the end of 1998, adding Little Red Rocket (see Azure Ray), and Boston rock group C60 (whose album he produced with engineer Matthew Ellard), to the Huge & Jolly Management roster.

Gang of Four's original line-up reunited in 2005, with Burnham telling Rolling Stone "It would be folly to go out and try to foist new music on people... What resonates is the old stuff, and we need to go out and do that. After all, the crux of it is the four of us onstage playing, making loud rude noises and running around furiously." He also told the New York Times' Jon Pareles, "I knew we could do it, when I saw we all still had our hair."

He spent 2005 and 2006 making those loud rude noises and won (with the band) Mojo magazine's " Inspiration to Music" and the U "LifeTime achievement in Music" awards. He last performed with the band in December 2006 at All Tomorrow's Parties at Minehead in England. Burnham along with Dave Allen left the band again in 2008, intending to focus on his studies and work as an academic.

Burnham completed his master's degree in Education from Cambridge College in 2006. He was an associate professor at the New England Institute of Art in Boston from 2000 until 2015, when he became Dean of Student Affairs, before leaving the college in October 2016. He was an Affiliated faculty member in the Communications Department at Emerson College in Boston, Massachusetts during 2018. He is currently Assistant Professor and Internship Faculty for The School of Performing & Visual Arts at Endicott College in Beverly, Massachusetts. He has re-joined Gang of Four to tour with fellow founder, Jon King and former bassist, Sara Lee with new member, guitarist David Pajo in 2022.

== Sources ==
- Pothier, Mark (3 March 2004). "His Gang days are behind him". The Boston Globe.
