= Dave Allen (bassist) =

British bassist (1955–2025)

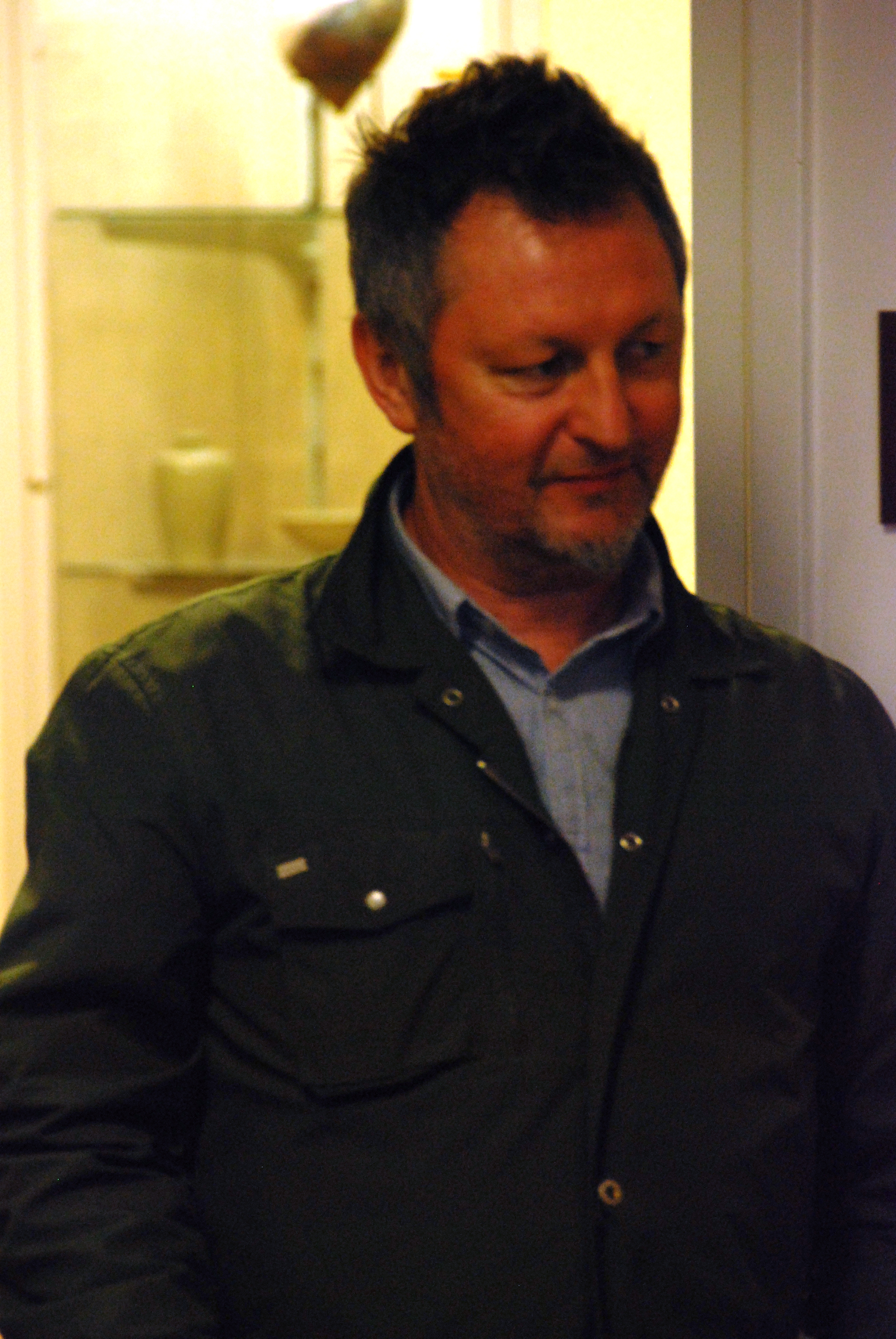
- Allen circa 2009

Background information
- Born: David Geoffrey Allen; 23 December 1955; Kendal, Westmorland, England
- Died: 5 April 2025 (aged 69)
- Genre: Post-punk
- Occupation: Bassist
- Formerly of: Gang of Four; Shriekback; King Swamp; Low Pop Suicide

David Geoffrey Allen (23 December 1955 – 5 April 2025) was an English musician, at one time the bass guitarist for the post-punk band Gang of Four. In 1981 he left the band to form Shriekback.

== Life and career ==
Allen was born in Kendal, Westmorland, England, on 23 December 1955.

He was the bass guitarist for the post-punk band Gang of Four between 1976 and 1981, and played on their first two albums. In 1981 he formed the band Shriekback with Barry Andrews of XTC.

After leaving Shriekback in 1988, Allen founded King Swamp with other former bandmates. He then founded World Domination Recordings and participated in two bands who recorded for the label. Allen was the vocalist and primary songwriter for The Elastic Purejoy, and played bass guitar in Low Pop Suicide which was fronted by Rick Boston. He appeared on several LPs and EPs with each of these bands, though his ambitious plan to release a work of 20 volumes produced only three releases, The Harvest and the Elastic Purejoy's The Clutter of Pop and Talk Radio. According to Pitchfork.com, in 2006, Allen formed a super group under the name Faux Hoax (supposedly pronounced 'Folks') with author Adam Gnade along with members of Menomena and Pioneers Press. A 7" single, "Your Friends Will Carry You Home", was released by Polyvinyl records in 2008.

Subsequently, he was director of Consumer Digital Audio Services at Intel in Portland, Oregon. He went on to be the president of the entertainment division of the Overland Agency, an advertising firm based in Portland. Later, he founded the digital strategy firm Fight, and ran the independent record label, Pampelmoose. In 2014, he joined Beats Music. After Apple Inc. acquired Beats, he stayed on with Apple Music.

Allen died on 5 April 2025, at the age of 69. As stated by former bandmate Hugo Burnham in Stereogum, "Allen had been living with early-onset dementia for the last several years of his life."
