= Jon King =

English singer & musician (born 1955)

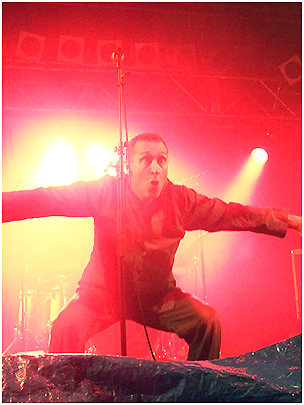
- King performing with Gang of Four in 2011

Background information
- Born: Jonathan Michael King; 8 June 1955 (age 71); Southwark, London, England
- Genre: Post-punk
- Occupations: Musician; singer; songwriter; director
- Instruments: Vocals; melodica; percussion

Jonathan Michael King (born 8 June 1955) is an English singer, musician, songwriter, and Grammy nominated art director, best known as the singer of the post-punk band Gang of Four.

== Biography ==
King attended Sevenoaks School, where he was a member of the 'Art Room' that produced musicians Tom Greenhalgh, Kevin Lycett and Mark White of The Mekons, along with Andy Gill of Gang of Four, documentarian Adam Curtis, and film director Paul Greengrass.

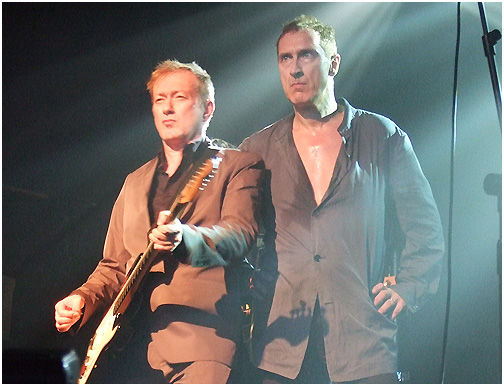
King (right) and Andy Gill performing with Gang of Four in 2011

As Gang of Four lyricist and co-songwriter, he sang and played melodica and percussion such as a microwave oven or wooden block (using a baseball bat or a stick), the latter notably on the song "He'd Send in the Army". Jon Pareles in The New York Times described King's lyrics as "bitterly analytical, infused with theories from Marx, Adorno, Baudrillard and Godard, and the band was determined to puncture pop romance with the consciousness that people are manipulated by power, economics, media and marketing.

Jon King co-wrote and co-produced Entertainment!, Gang of Four's debut album, regularly listed as among the top 100 albums of all time and described by Rolling Stone magazine as "the best debut album by a British band – punk or otherwise – since the original English release of The Clash in 1977.

Referring to the influence of Situationist ideas on Gang of Four's work, Jon King remarked, in a 1980 letter to Greil Marcus, that "where I think that Situationism was good was in the development of its revolutionary tactic: 'reinvesting' the cultural past. Situationism conspicuously used popular imagery in order to subvert it – to make the familiar strange, rather than rejecting the familiar out of hand. The tactic was good, worth ripping off, as in the Entertainment! cover, or the original 'Damaged Goods' sleeve." In an interview with NPR, the author stated "King's lyrics have always meant different things to different people. Some see his words as a reaction to Margaret Thatcher, unemployment in early-'80s Britain or the unraveling of the unions. But King says he was more interested in "changing the meaning of things by the label." King said in the same feature: "I remember when I was 15, I got incredibly excited when I found some grubby old book in a secondhand bookshop about the revolution in Paris in 1968 (...) There was a picture, which I still cherish – it was a photograph for some kind of perfume and a very glamorous-looking woman on this poster, and someone had written on it in French: "You know I know I'm exploiting you, but I'm not doing it on purpose". I got terribly excited by the fact ... you can change the meaning of things by the label... I wondered how one could play around with these sorts of ideas in music".

King was primary lyricist in the band and wrote words to almost all their most influential songs, including "Damaged Goods", "Natural's Not In It", "I Found That Essence Rare", "What We All Want", "I Love a Man in a Uniform", "Call Me Up" and others. He said of his lyrics, quoted by Michael Hoover: "If you, say, look at the published agenda of music which limits itself to a very small set of subjects and the way it approaches these subjects (which in its most extreme identity is a sort of Bryan Adams-style song), about missing or making up with your girl, driving the car, in some sort of all-white, midwestern high school, which is an incredibly common motif ... I don't know anything about that. That is something which is a very specific American topic, but it seems to be exhaustively gone around. I had a chance to describe it the other night, like a dog returning to its own vomit." The Guardian, in its citation of Entertainment! as one of 100 greatest British albums of all time, said that King's "lyrics performed the minor miracle of rendering deconstructionist slogans - Marx and Engels by way of Guy Debord - into telegrammatic rock'n'roll rabble-rousing." "In other words, pop songs as false emotional advertising and ideology as everydayness are themselves grounds for inquiry," as King told Greil Marcus, because "unless you have an awareness of your views as political manifestations, you won't believe you can change them". A 2014 re-appraisal of Entertainment! said, in reference to King's lyrics, that they "deal with one of Karl Marx’s theories most widely favoured by the Situationists, the guttansweng [Gattungswesen] ('species-being')." The guttansweng is the idea that people become separated from their human nature and thus become alienated within a capitalist environment – "At Home He's a Tourist" is surely inspired by chapter 30 of Guy Debord's definitive text The Society of the Spectacle, which features the lines 'the externality of the spectacle in relation to the active man appears in the fact that his gestures are no longer his but those of another who represent them to him. This is why the spectator feels at home nowhere, because the spectacle is everywhere." King himself, talking about the same song, said: "Sometimes, you get lucky and a line comes that makes everything easy. Suddenly getting the answer to a question when you turn off and think about something else. Thrown-ness - if that's a word at all – was something we puzzled over. Why, if everything is like it is, do so many things seem ersatz, phoney. But it's not phoney if you know it's phoney, as Truman Capote said of Holly Golightly, "she's not a phoney because she's a real phoney."

King created the cover art for many of their albums, including the outer sleeve designs for the Damaged Goods EP, "At Home He's a Tourist", Entertainment!, Solid Gold, and A Brief History of the 20th Century. He was nominated for a Grammy in 2022 for his art direction of Gang of Four 77-81, a Matador records box-set issued in 2021.

King has written music for TV and film, notably title music for the BBC's Pandora's Box, Scrutiny and Westminster Daily. He co-wrote and produced songs featured on TV and the soundtracks of major movies such as The Karate Kid (1984), The Manchurian Candidate (2004), and Marie Antoinette (2006); 13 Reasons Why (Netflix) The OC (HBO); and Treme (HBO). "Natural's Not in It" (from the album Entertainment!) was used for 2012's global Xbox ad campaign. He won in 2005 (as Gang of Four) Mojo Magazine's "Inspiration to Music" MOJO Awards. In 2011 he performed with Gang of Four on the Late Show with David Letterman and Later... with Jools Holland.

King's memoire, "To Hell With Poverty!", was published in 2025 by Constable and Akashik Books in North America. The title won much praise. MOJO magazine's review said: "‘To Hell With Poverty! captures something of [Gang of Four’s] essence rare: fractious, discordant, thrilling’"; Louder Than War rated it as one of the best music books of 2025. Its review of the book said that it was "‘Entertaining and revealing . . . it offers a deeply human portrait of its narrator, a creative force shaped by chaos, resilience and an unrelenting drive to make art. It is a personal and, at times, harrowing journey which provides insight into a band that contributed to the evolution of rock music and inspired generations’. The book is scheduled for publication as a paperback in the UK in April 2026.
