= Rickie Lee Jones discography =

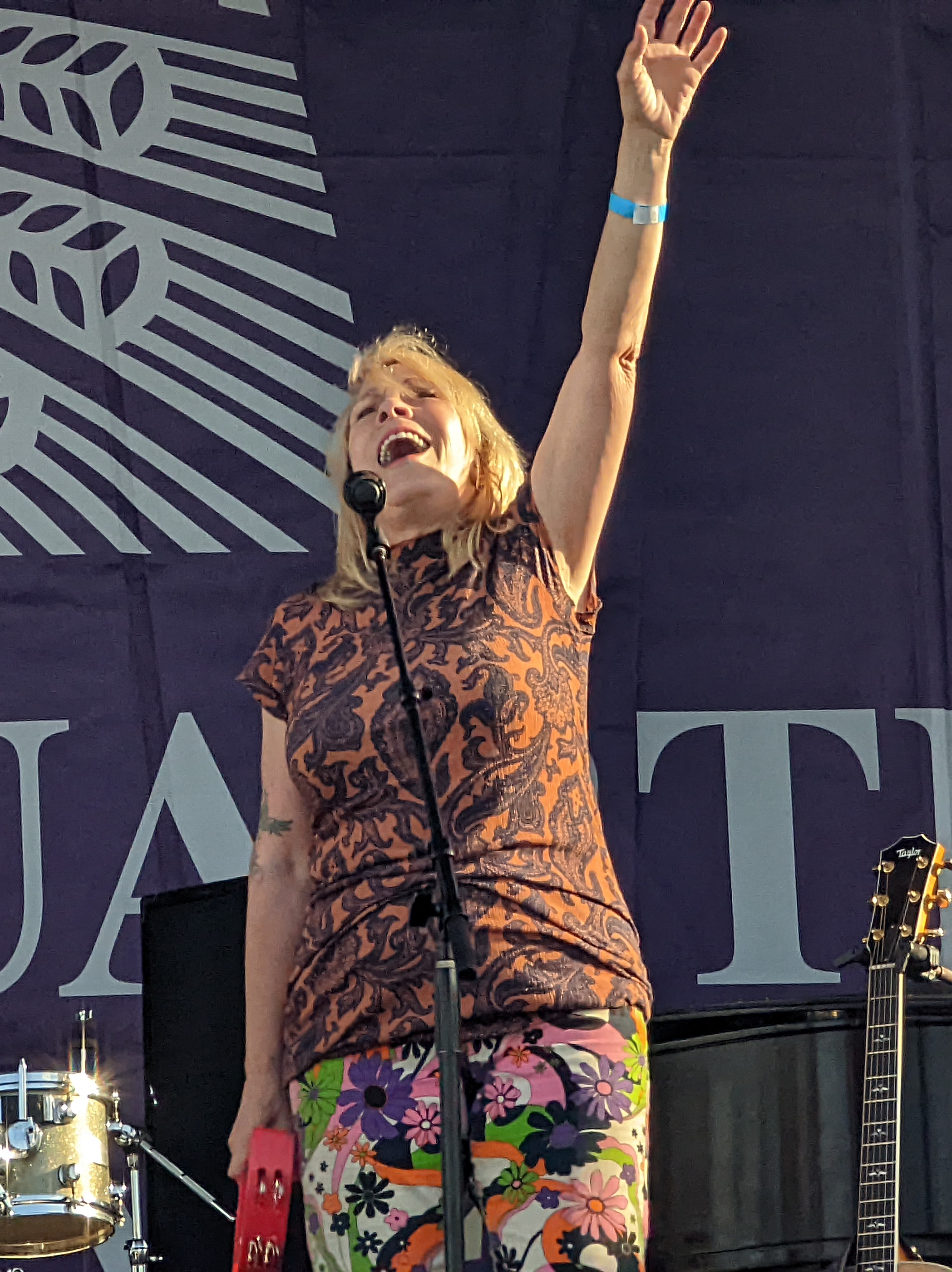
- Jones performing in 2022
- Studio albums: 15
- Live albums: 2
- Compilation albums: 2
- Singles: 22
- Video albums: 1
- Extended plays: 1

The discography of Rickie Lee Jones, an American singer, songwriter, and author, consists of 15 studio albums, two live albums, two compilation albums, one extended play, one video album, and 22 singles, on Warner Bros. Records, Geffen Records, Reprise Records, Artemis Records, V2 Records, New West Records, Fantasy Records, Rhino Entertainment, and the Other Side of Desire Records.

Jones' first two albums, Rickie Lee Jones (1979) and Pirates (1981), both hit the Top 5 on the US Billboard 200 and were certified platinum and gold, respectively. Her fourth album, Flying Cowboys (1989), reached the Top 40 and was also certified gold. Rickie Lee Jones and Pirates also reached the Top 40 on the UK Albums Chart and both were certified silver. Rickie Lee Jones also went to No. 1 in Australia and was certified 2× platinum.

== Albums ==
=== Studio albums ===
Year	Album details	Chart positions					Certifications (sales thresholds)
Year	Album details	US	US Jazz	US Folk	AUS	UK	Certifications (sales thresholds)
1979	Rickie Lee Jones: Released: February 28, 1979; Label: Warner Bros.	3	—	—	1	18	RIAA: Platinum; ARIA: 2× Platinum; BPI: Silver
1981	Pirates: Released: July 15, 1981; Label: Warner Bros.	5	—	—	9	37	RIAA: Gold; BPI: Silver
1984	The Magazine: Released: September 12, 1984; Label: Warner Bros.	44	20	—	33	40	
1989	Flying Cowboys: Released: September 26, 1989; Label: Geffen	39	—	—	70	50	RIAA: Gold
1991	Pop Pop: Released: September 24, 1991; Label: Geffen	121	8^{[A]}	—	—	—	
1993	Traffic from Paradise: Released: September 14, 1993; Label: Geffen	111	—	—	—	—	
1997	Ghostyhead: Released: June 17, 1997; Label: Reprise	159	—	—	—	—	
2000	It's Like This: Released: September 12, 2000; Label: Artemis	148	—	—	—	185	
2003	The Evening of My Best Day: Released: October 7, 2003; Label: V2	189	—	—	—	—	
2007	The Sermon on Exposition Boulevard: Released: February 6, 2007; Label: New West	158	—	—	—	—	
2009	Balm in Gilead: Released: November 3, 2009; Label: Fantasy	—	—	7	—	—	
2012	The Devil You Know: Released: September 18, 2012; Label: Fantasy	190	—	—	—	—	
2015	The Other Side of Desire: Release date: June 23, 2015; Label: The Other Side of Desire	164	—	—	—	—	
2019	Kicks: Release date: June 7, 2019; Label: The Other Side of Desire	—	—	—	—	—	
2023	Pieces of Treasure: Release date: April 28, 2023; Label: Modern Recordings / BMG Rights Management	—	—	—	—	—	
"—" denotes releases that did not chart

Notes

- ^{A} Peaked position on Billboard Top Contemporary Jazz chart.

=== Live albums ===
Year	Album details
1995	Naked Songs: Live and Acoustic: Released: September 19, 1995; Label: Reprise
2001	Live at Red Rocks: Released: December 4, 2001; Label: Artemis

=== Compilation albums ===
Year	Album details
2005	Duchess of Coolsville: An Anthology: Released: June 28, 2005; Label: WSM / Rhino
2010	Original Album Series: Released: March 1, 2010; Label: Warner Bros. / Rhino UK

=== Video albums ===
Year	Album details
2011	Live in Stockholm: Released: July 5, 2011; Label: MRI; Formats: DVD

== Extended plays ==
Year	EP details
1983	Girl at Her Volcano: Released: 1983; Label: Warner Bros.

== Singles ==
Year	Title	Chart positions				Album
Year	Title	US	US Main	AUS	UK	Album
1979	"Chuck E.'s in Love"	4	—	15	18	Rickie Lee Jones
1979	"Young Blood"	40	—	—	—	Rickie Lee Jones
1979	"Danny's All-Star Joint"	—	—	—	—	Rickie Lee Jones
1981	"A Lucky Guy"	64	—	—	—	Pirates
1981	"Pirates (So Long Lonely Avenue)"	—	40	—	—	Pirates
1981	"Woody and Dutch on the Slow Train to Peking"	—	31	—	—	Pirates
1983	"Under the Boardwalk"	—	—	—	—	Girl at Her Volcano
1984	"It Must Be Love"	—	—	—	—	The Magazine
1984	"The Real End"	83	—	90	—	The Magazine
1989	"Satellites"	—	—	—	—	Flying Cowboys
1989	"Flying Cowboys / The Horses"	—	—	—	—	Flying Cowboys
1989	"Don't Let the Sun Catch You Crying"	—	—	—	—	Flying Cowboys
1991	"Up from the Skies"	—	—	—	—	Pop Pop
1993	"Rebel Rebel"	—	—	—	—	Traffic from Paradise
1993	"Stewart's Coat"	—	—	—	—	Traffic from Paradise
1997	"Firewalker"	—	—	—	—	Ghostyhead
2000	"Show Biz Kids"	—	—	—	—	It's Like That
2003	"Second Chance"	—	—	—	—	The Evening of My Best Day
2006	"Falling Up"	—	—	—	—	The Sermon on Exposition Boulevard
2009	"Old Enough"	—	—	—	—	Balm in Gilead
2015	"Jimmy Choos"	—	—	—	—	The Other Side of Desire
2019	"Bad Company"	—	—	—	—	Kicks
"—" denotes releases that did not chart or were not released in that territory.

== Other contributions ==
Credits adapted from AllMusic.

- Guest vocals on "Sidekick" from Chuck E. Weiss' album The Other Side of Town (1981)
- Guest vocals on "Between a Laugh and a Tear" from John Cougar Mellencamp's album Scarecrow (1985)
- Lead vocals on "The Moon Is Made of Gold" and "Autumn Leaves" from Rob Wasserman's album Duets (1988)
- Duet vocals on "Makin' Whoopee!" from Dr. John's album In a Sentimental Mood (1989)
- Duet vocals on "Easter Parade" from The Blue Nile's single "Headlights on the Parade" (1989)
- Lead vocals on "O Holy Night" from The Chieftains' album The Bells of Dublin (1991)
- Guest vocals on "North Dakota" from Lyle Lovett's album Joshua Judges Ruth (1991) and Live in Texas (1999)
- Little Fluffy Clouds (1990–93) – Spoken word sampled by British ambient-house group, The Orb, charting three times on the UK Singles Chart: No. 87 (1990), No. 95 (1991), and No. 10 (1993).
- Production and harmony vocals on Leo Kottke's album Peculiaroso (1994)
- Guest vocals on "Spirit" from Wild Colonials' album This Can't Be Life (1996)
- Duet vocals on "I Scare Myself" and "Driftin" from Dan Hicks and His Hot Licks' album Beatin' the Heat (2000)
- WFUV: City Folk Live VII (2004) – "Mink Coat at the Bus Stop"
- Duet vocals on "Comes Love" from Willie Nelson's album Outlaws and Angels (2004)
- Lead vocals on "Subterranean Homesick Blues" from The Village: A Celebration of the Music of Greenwich Village 429 Records (2009)
- Lead vocals on "Been on a Train" from the Laura Nyro tribute album Map to the Treasure: Reimagining Laura Nyro by Billy Childs. (2014)
- Spoken word on "From Space" from Anders Osborne's album Spacedust & Oceanviews (2016)
- "Dark Was the Night – Cold Was the Ground" from the Blind Willie Johnson tribute album God Don't Never Change: The Songs of Blind Willie Johnson (2016)
- Guest vocals on "Roll Um Easy" from Jonah Tolchin's album Fires for the Cold (2019)
- Lead vocals on "Walk On The Wild Side" from Lou Reed tribute album: The Power of the Heart: A Tribute to Lou Reed (2024) Light In the Attic/LITA 217
