= Low Pop Suicide =

Rock band

- Origin: Los Angeles, California, United States
- Genres: Alternative rock, alternative metal, industrial rock
- Years active: 1991–1995
- Labels: Capitol Records; World Domination Recordings
- Past members: Dave Allen; Jeff Ward; Rick Boston; Chrissy Shefts; Melle Steagal; Mark Leonard; Rob Brill; Sheldon Gomberg

Low Pop Suicide was an alternative rock band, formed in 1991 by Rick Boston (lead vocals/guitars), Dave Allen (bass), and Jeff Ward (drums/backing vocals). The band released four studio efforts in the 1990s through Capitol Records/World Domination Recordings. They disbanded in 1995.

== History ==
Low Pop Suicide formed in 1991. The original lineup consisted of bassist Dave Allen (Gang of Four/Shriekback), vocalist/guitarist Rick Boston (Sky Cries Mary/Hand of Fate), and drummer Jeff Ward (Lard/Nine Inch Nails/Ministry). Allen, who had founded the record label World Domination Recordings, utilized Low Pop Suicide as the label's showcase band. World Domination Recordings also received distribution through the major label Capitol Records. Allen and Boston had formed a musical partnership, as they co-produced and co-wrote for various other artists together. When Ward was touring with Nine Inch Nails for the 1991 iteration of Lollapalooza, Allen had met him backstage at one of the shows. After Nine Inch Nails had finished touring that year, Boston, Allen, and Ward subsequently started to record demos together.

Low Pop Suicide reconvened in 1992, and they released their debut EP The Disengagement that year. Around the same time, Chrissy Shefts joined the band as a second guitarist. Their first music video, "Disengaged", was filmed to promote the EP. One of the songs on The Disengagement, "Turn of the Screw", was re-recorded and remixed by fellow World Domination Recordings band Contagion. It appeared on their debut album Contaminant PCB (1992). Boston and Allen had contributed to nearly every song on the album, both musically and technologically.

Throughout 1992, Low Pop Suicide recorded their proper full-length album, although Shefts left the band and the lineup stayed as a trio during the album's recording sessions. In early 1993, the album, titled On the Cross of Commerce, was released. "My Way" and "Kiss Your Lips" were released as the album's singles. Around the same time, Ward moved from Los Angeles to his hometown of Chicago, and he was replaced by Melle Steagal on drums for the tour in support of the album. Due to a mixture of drug issues and overall depression, Ward committed suicide at the age of 30 on March 19, 1993. His cause of death was reported as carbon monoxide poisoning. Low Pop Suicide, with The Psyclone Rangers as openers, toured the US during the summer of 1993. For the 1993 film The Harvest, Boston and Allen had produced the film's score under the name The Crash Baptists. The soundtrack also included the exclusive Low Pop Suicide song "I Want You Alive". In early 1994, the music video for "Kiss Your Lips" was notably featured in an episode of Beavis and Butt-Head.

Allen departed from Low Pop Suicide in 1994 in order to focus on his business career with World Domination Recordings, although he remained as the band's A&R person. Boston retained Steagal on drums and recruited Mark Leonard on bass for the band's 1994 follow-up album, The Death of Excellence. "Life & Death" was released as the album's lead single. For the touring cycle, Boston revised the lineup once again, with Rob Brill replacing Steagal on drums and Sheldon Gomberg replacing Leonard on bass (both musicians had played together in The Big F). Low Pop Suicide toured with Compulsion throughout the US.

The following year, Boston essentially turned Low Pop Suicide into a solo project via recording an acoustic EP. It was initially released under the title Unzipped in 1995. By the end of the year, Boston disbanded Low Pop Suicide. He subsequently re-released Unzipped under his own name in 1996, albeit under the title Numb.

Boston went on to work with numerous other artists, such as Rickie Lee Jones and Alice Cooper. He also composed for different films and TV shows over the next few decades. After leaving Low Pop Suicide, Allen became the frontman of the short-lived band The Elastic Purejoy. Allen eventually reconciled with Gang of Four in 2004, appearing on their 2005 album Return the Gift. He was also an executive at various companies in the 2000s and 2010s, such as Intel, Overland Agency, and Beats Music. Allen died on April 5, 2025 at the age of 69. It was reported that he had dementia during the last few years of his life.

== Members ==
- Rick Boston – lead vocals, guitars (1991–1995)
- Dave Allen – bass (1991–1994); died 2025
- Jeff Ward – drums, backing vocals (1991–1993); died 1993
- Chrissy Shefts – guitars (1992)
- Melle Steagal – drums (1993–1994)
- Mark Leonard – bass (1994)
- Rob Brill – drums (1994–1995)
- Sheldon Gomberg – bass (1994–1995)

=== Timeline ===
Color denotes main live duty.

== Discography ==
=== Albums ===
- The Disengagement (1992) (Note: Released as a studio mini-album/EP.)
- On the Cross of Commerce (1993)
- The Death of Excellence (1994)
- Unzipped (1995)

=== Singles ===
- "Disengaged" (1992)
- "Crush" (1993)
- "Kiss Your Lips" (1993)
- "My Way" (1993)
- "Life & Death" (1994)
- "Zombie" (1995)
