= Rick Boston =

Canadian musician, composer and producer

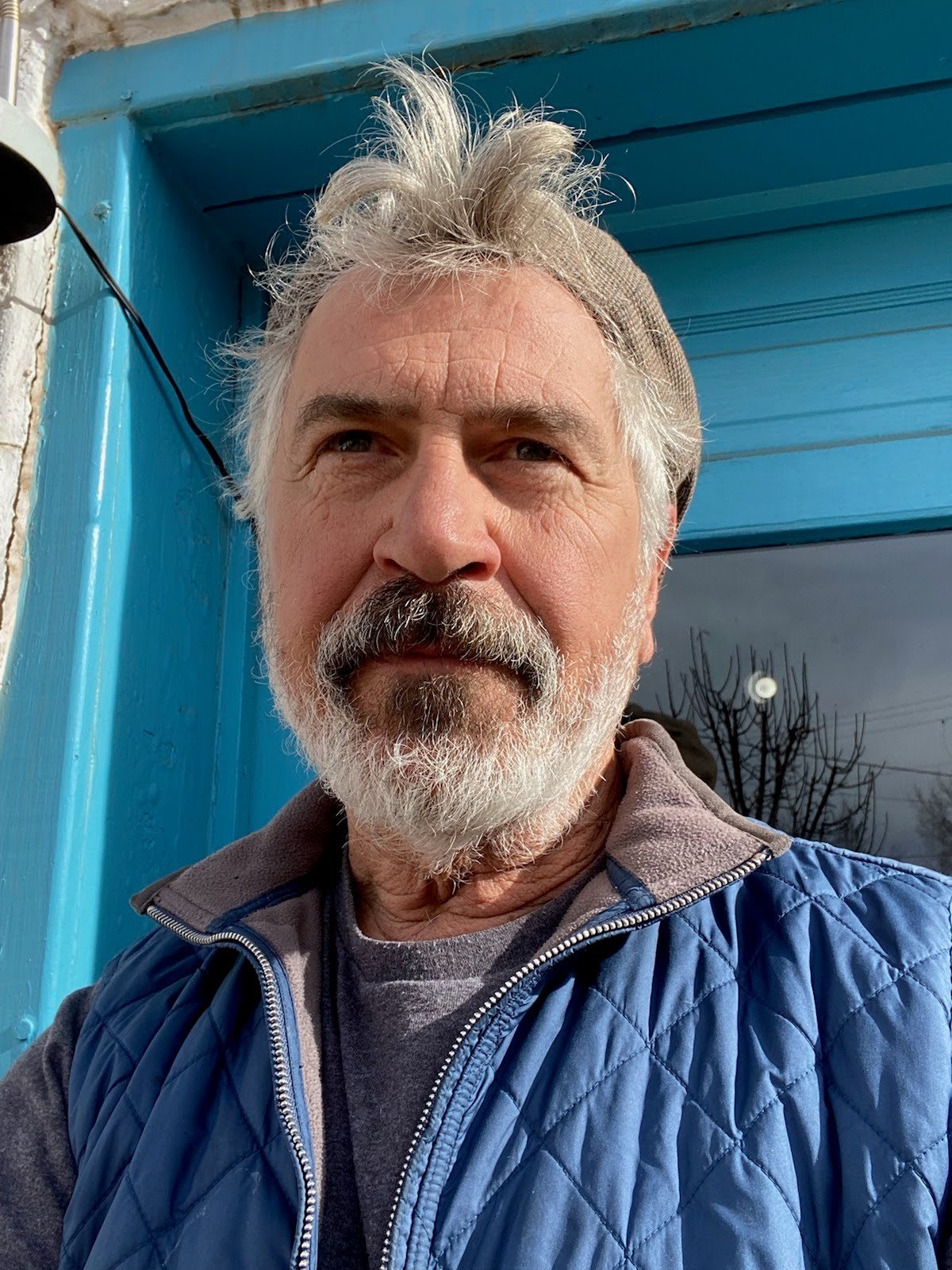
- Rick Boston in March 2022

Background information
- Born: Richard Wallie Boston; Edmonton, Alberta, Canada
- Origin: Los Angeles
- Genres: Indie rock
- Occupations: Guitarist, composer, producer, singer-songwriter
- Instruments: Guitar, piano, bass guitar
- Labels: Foodchain Records; World Domination

Richard Wallie Boston is a Canadian musician, composer and producer based in Los Angeles, United States. He is known for his roles in Low Pop Suicide and for producing Rickie Lee Jones' album, Ghostyhead.

== Early life and education ==
Richard Wallie Boston was born in Edmonton, Alberta, Canada. He studied jazz arrangement and composition.

== Career ==
Boston played guitar for Belinda Carlisle's 1988 album, Heaven on Earth. He was a member of Hand of Fate, working with John Keck to produce the 1990 album, Hand of Fate, and is credited for vocals. He played guitar for and produced Sky Cries Mary's 1991 EP, Exit at the Axis.

Boston subsequently worked extensively with Dave Allen, who had founded World Domination Recordings. Boston was the frontman of Low Pop Suicide, singing and playing lead guitar, on their 1993 debut album On the Cross of Commerce; both Allen and Jeff Ward then exited the band. As the only founder left, the band's second LP, The Death of Excellence, was a more personal vehicle. Exploring a more acoustic sound, Boston released one solo album in 1996, Numb, a verbatim copy of Low Pop Suicide's last release, the Unzipped EP.

In 1997, he partnered with Rickie Lee Jones in songwriting, playing, and production for her album Ghostyhead.

Boston was also a member of The Januaries, which released two albums in 2000, The Januaries and The Girl's Insane. The title track of the latter album also appears on the 2006 album Versions by Thievery Corporation.

=== Composer ===
Boston composed "You Know We're Gonna Hurt" for Joe Cocker's 1989 album, One Night of Sin. He composed eight of the songs on Lowen & Navarro's 1991 album, Walking on a Wire, and another for their 1993 album, Broken Moon.

In 2003, Boston was co-writer with Lili Haydn on the song "Come Here" on her album Light Blue Sun. Boston worked as composer on Alice Cooper's 2005 album, Dirty Diamonds for which he co-composed "Woman of Mass Distraction", "You Make Me Wanna", "Dirty Diamonds", "Zombie Dance", and "Stand".

==== Film songs and scores ====
In 1987, with Lowen & Navarro, Boston wrote "It's Time To Move", a song for the film 1987 Police Academy 4: Citizens on Patrol. He also worked with Jeff "Skunk" Baxter on songs for the American romantic comedy film Roxanne directed by Fred Schepisi. The songs were "Party Tonight", written by Jeffrey Baxter (as Jeff "Skunk" Baxter) and Rick Boston, "Can This Be Love", written by Jeffrey Baxter (as Jeff "Skunk" Baxter), Rick Boston, Janet Minto, and Pamela.

In 1988, Boston was the songwriter for "She's Cruel" and "Killer Groove" for Death Spa, an American horror film directed by Michael Fischa and starring William Bumiller, Brenda Bakke, and Merritt Butrick. He also wrote "Rebuilding the Big House" for the film A Nightmare on Elm Street 4: The Dream Master.

In 1993, as a side project with Dave Allen as the Crash Baptists, Boston composed music for The Harvest, a 1993 thriller directed by David Marconi.

In 2008, Boston and John O'Brien composed a big band-style arrangement of the Iron Man theme song for the film Iron Man (2008 version), directed by Jon Favreau.

=== Producer ===
Boston worked with John Keck to produce the 1990 album, Hand of Fate. In 1997, he partnered with Rickie Lee Jones in songwriting, playing, and production for her album Ghostyhead.

In 2006, Boston worked as producer with artists Rodleen Getsic and Norwood Fisher of Fishbone on Getsic's song, "The Reaper".

== Selected discography ==
Solo

- Rick Boston (1996). Numb (CD). World Domination.

With Hand of Fate

- Hand of Fate (1990). Hand Of Fate (CD). WTG Records.

With Sky Cries Mary

- Sky Cries Mary (1991). Exit at the Axis (EP). Rick Boston (guitar, producer). Capitol.

With Low Pop Suicide

- Low Pop Suicide (1992). The Disengagement (EP). Rick Boston (producer). World Domination.
- Low Pop Suicide (1993). On the Cross of Commerce (CD). Rick Boston (composer, guitar, producer, vocals). World Domination.
- Low Pop Suicide (1995). The Death of Excellence (CD). Rick Boston (artwork, bass, composer, guitar, producer, vocals). World Domination.

With Rickie Lee Jones

- Rickie Lee Jones (1997). Ghostyhead (CD). Rick Boston (bass, bells, composer, dulcimer, guitar, kalimba, loops, piano, producer, programming, recorder, Wurlitzer). Reprise/Warner Bros. Records. 46557.

With The Januaries

- The Januaries (2000a). The Januaries (CD). Rick Boston (bass, composer, guitar, producer, programming, background vocals). Foodchain Records/Lightyear.
- The Januaries (2000b). The Girl's Insane (CD). Rick Boston (composer, performer). Foodchain Records.

The Rick Boston Jamie Cohen Project

- The Rick Boston Jamie Cohen Project (2009). All The Way From America (EP). Halfpipe Records.

As composer

- Lowen & Navarro (1991). Walking on a Wire (CD). Chameleon.
- Alice Cooper (2005). Dirty Diamonds (studio album). New West / Spitfire.
