= Russ Titelman =

American record producer and songwriter (born 1944)

- Born: August 16, 1944 (age 81); Los Angeles, California, U.S.
- Occupations: Music producer, songwriter

Russ Titelman (born August 16, 1944, Los Angeles, California, United States) is an American record producer and songwriter. He has to date won three Grammy Awards. He earned his first producing the Steve Winwood song "Higher Love", and his second and third for Eric Clapton's Journeyman and Unplugged albums, respectively. Titelman also produced Clapton's 24 Nights live album of 1990 and the all-blues album From the Cradle, released in 1994.

== Biography ==
Titelman's family is Jewish. He began his musical career in the 1960s. He was the rhythm guitarist in the house band on the television show Shindig! He studied sitar for a year under Ravi Shankar, at the latter's Kinnara School of Music in Los Angeles. He has worked with rock musicians such as Nancy Sinatra, The Monkees, Dion DiMucci, George Harrison, Bee Gees, Little Feat, Christine McVie, Meat Loaf, Paul Simon, Brian Wilson, The Allman Brothers Band, James Taylor, Rickie Lee Jones, Chaka Khan with Rufus and solo, Ry Cooder, Randy Newman, Gordon Lightfoot, Eric Clapton, Steve Winwood, Neil Young, Crazy Horse and Gerry Goffin. After having worked for Warner Bros. Records for 20 years, Titelman has been an independent producer since 1997.

Titelman started his independent music label Walking Liberty Records in New York. One of his first productions for the label was the debut album by the Oklahoma-based singer-songwriter Jared Tyler. Released in 2005, Blue Alleluia included guest appearances from Emmylou Harris, Mac McAnally and Mary Kay Place.

== Selected production credits ==
Randy Newman

- Sail Away (1972)
- Good Old Boys (1974)
- Little Criminals (1977)
- Born Again (1979)
- Trouble in Paradise (1983)

Paul Simon

- Hearts and Bones (1983)

Ry Cooder

- Paradise and Lunch (1974)

James Taylor

- Gorilla (1975)
- October Road (2002)

George Harrison

- George Harrison (1979)

Rickie Lee Jones

- Rickie Lee Jones (1979)
- Pirates (1981)
- Naked Songs – Live and Acoustic (1995) (co-produced)
- Pieces of Treasure (2023)

Rufus and Chaka Khan

- Stompin' at the Savoy – Live (1983)

Christine McVie

- Christine McVie (1984)

George Benson

- 20/20 (1985)

Steve Winwood

- Back in the High Life (1986)

Aztec Camera

- Deep & Wide & Tall (1987)

Brian Wilson

- Brian Wilson (1988)

Chaka Khan

- CK (1988)

Eric Clapton

- Journeyman (1989)
- Unplugged (1992)

Meat Loaf

- The Very Best of Meat Loaf (track: "Is Nothing Sacred") (1998)

Cyndi Lauper

- At Last (2003)
