= The Magazine (album) =

Studio album by Rickie Lee Jones
- Released: September 12, 1984
- Recorded: January 18–June 1, 1984
- Genre: Rock
- Length: 42:56
- Label: Warner Bros.
- Producer: Rickie Lee Jones, James Newton Howard (# 1–8)

Rickie Lee Jones chronology
Girl at Her Volcano (1983)	The Magazine (1984)	Flying Cowboys (1989)

The Magazine is an album by Rickie Lee Jones, released in September 1984. It is her third full-length studio album, released as the follow-up to Pirates (1981). The album was partly composed in France and was co-produced by Jones and James Newton Howard.

== Genesis ==
After the release of Pirates in July 1981, Jones spent 1982 on the road on tour before kicking her addiction to heroin and cocaine. A 10-inch EP, Girl at Her Volcano, had been released in 1983 and Jones took up residence in Paris in April 1983 for four months. Jones said: "I got an apartment for $800 on the Boulevard des Invalides, where they have all the political demonstrations. I wasn't in such great shape and, appropriately, I lived with the invalids." It was also in Paris that Jones kicked her alcohol habit. She told Timothy White in Musician in 1984: "I started drinking...more heavily than I had ever drunk in my life. I drank for about six weeks. When I started waking up and drinking in the day, I figured-umm, bad news. I don't know how I quit drinking; I finally just drank too much one night and said, ‘That's enough of this, it's awful.’ I think I went to Paris to put it together; I had to be in an absolutely foreign environment, to take stock."

Jones had been working on fragments of songs, such as "Juke Box Fury", "Gravity" and the initially Shirelles-inspired "Runaround," since 1981, before finding more inspiration in Paris. The first full song written was "Deep Space," precipitating a spurt of creativity from October 1983. Recording work for the album began on January 18, 1984 and was completed on June 1 before a September release date.

The opening instrumental "Prelude to Gravity," written in France and London, was originally titled "Things Made of Glass" and was written by Jones for inclusion in a planned children's fantasy she wrote about "two little girls who keep their most prized possessions, thoughts and dreams in these special jars."

The album ends with a musical suite entitled "Rorschachs" with "Theme for the Pope" co-written by long-time collaborator and former romantic partner Sal Bernardi.

== Critical reception ==
Professional ratings
Review scores
Source	Rating
AllMusic	3/5 stars
Robert Christgau	B−

The New York Times, Sep. 16, 1984 - "Miss Jones is still looking for direction on The Magazine. She doesn't want to be one more pop songwriter, but she knows better than to go off the deep end. The Magazine leaves us awaiting Miss Jones's next step, and provides some enigmas while we wait."

Daily Collegian, Penn State University, Oct. 15, 1984 - "The Magazine does insert a few more classic cuts and several mighty listenable selections into Jones' musical lexicon. You can't help wishing, though, that she had stuck to more earthbound topics and unforced rhythms that made her past efforts such pleasures."

New Straits Times (Malaysia), Dec. 2, 1984 - "The music skips, almost nonchalantly, from sparse hymn-like melodies to lilting moods to fractured beats, conveying jazz shadings and evoking appropriate atmospherics."

Time, Dec. 17, 1984 - "This is only her third full album, and she seems bent on proving, quite unnecessarily, what she has already established: she is the most enterprising woman writer making records today. The Magazine, a spiraling cycle of songs organized around themes of loneliness, defiance, memory and renewal, seems as if it was long and hard in coming."

NME ranked it number 10 among the "Albums of the Year" for 1984.

== Track listing ==
Credits adapted from the album's liner notes. All tracks written by Rickie Lee Jones, except track 9, co-written by Sal Bernardi.

No.	Title	Length
1.	"Prelude to Gravity"	2:49
2.	"Gravity"	4:48
3.	"Juke Box Fury"	4:12
4.	"It Must Be Love"	4:57
5.	"Magazine"	4:43
6.	"The Real End"	5:04
7.	"Deep Space"	3:13
8.	"Runaround"	4:59
9.	"Rorschachs (Theme for the Pope)"	3:20
10.	"Rorschachs (The Unsigned Painting/The Weird Beast)"	4:51
Total length:		42:56

Notes

- Rorschachs (Theme for the Pope) is instrumental on CD releases, vocal on some vinyl and cassette releases.

== Personnel ==
- Rickie Lee Jones – vocals, piano, synthesizer (GS-1 digital synthesizer on # 7)
- James Newton Howard – synthesizer
- Greg Phillinganes – Fender Rhodes (# 2)
- Michael Boddicker – additional programming (# 2), additional synthesizer (# 8)
- Neil Larsen – DX-7 synthesizer (# 3), organ (# 6), Wurlitzer electric piano (# 8)
- Nick DeCaro – accordion (# 9)
- Dean Parks – guitar (# 2, 5)
- Buzz Feiten – guitar (# 3, 6)
- Jeff Pevar – guitar (# 4), 12-string guitar, mandolin (# 9)
- Steve Lukather – guitar (# 8)
- Sal Bernardi – acoustic guitar, vocals (# 9)
- Nathan East – bass (# 2, 3, 6, 8)
- Steve Gadd – drums (# 2, 3, 6, 8)
- Lenny Castro – percussion (# 2, 3, 4, 6, 8)
- David Hungate – bass (# 4, 5)
- Jeff Porcaro – drums (# 4, 5)
- Victor Feldman – percussion (# 5)
- Strings for "Prelude to Gravity" arranged by James Newton Howard and Marty Paich and conducted by Paich
- Strings for "Magazine" arranged and conducted by James Newton Howard
- Horn arrangement for "Juke Box Fury" by Rickie Lee Jones and Jerry Hey, for "The Real End" by Jerry Hey

Technical

- Mark Linett – Recording and mixing engineer
- Rickie Lee Jones – art direction
- Ethan Russell – front cover photography

== Charts ==
Chart (1984)	Peak position
Australian Albums (Kent Music Report)	33
UK Albums (OCC)	40
US Billboard 200	44
US Billboard Top Jazz Albums	20
