= The Elastic Purejoy =

Alternative rock group

The Elastic Purejoy was an alternative rock group active in the mid-1990s and led by English bassist-singer Dave Allen. Their work was released on Allen's World Domination Recordings. Their sound can be characterized as bass-driven, progressive indie rock and pop, with lyrics often inspired by major literary writers of the 20th Century.

After their first release, Allen's name appeared more prominently on the records' packaging as if they were solo releases rather than a band. Their last two releases were subtitled "2/20" and "3/20", the last new contributions to Allen's plan at the time to release a series of twenty records. ("1/20" was the soundtrack to the movie The Harvest.)

== Discography ==
- The Elastic Purejoy (1994)
- The South Phoenix EP (1994)
- The Clutter of Pop (1996)
- Talk Radio EP (1996)
