= The Harvest (1993 film) =

- Directed by: David Marconi
- Written by: David Marconi
- Starring: Miguel Ferrer; Leilani Sarelle; Tony Denison; Henry Silva; Angélica Aragón
- Music by: Rick Boston
- Release date: 1993
- Running time: 97 minutes
- Countries: Mexico; United States
- Languages: English; Spanish

The Harvest is a 1993 Mexican-American thriller directed by David Marconi and starring Miguel Ferrer, Leilani Sarelle, Tony Denison and Henry Silva. Its soundtrack was played by artists from World Domination Recordings.

This was a rare lead role for Ferrer, predominantly known as a character actor in supporting roles; he and leading lady Sarelle were married. Ferrer's cousin George Clooney appears briefly in the film, playing a transvestite.

== Plot ==
Charlie Pope (Miguel Ferrer) is a writer who goes to Mexico to write the ending of the plot for a movie. In Mexico he is attracted to a woman, Natalie (Leilani Sarelle). They go together to a beach where when she goes away to swim, he is attacked and wakes up five days later. When he wakes up he discovers that one of his kidneys has been removed. Rather than return he decides to find the "ring" whose members removed his kidney. He begins by tracking down Natalie (whose involvement with the ring he is unsure of). He returns to United States with Natalie. There he is attacked by Noel (Tony Denison) who tells him that the surgery was a failure and they require his other kidney. He learns that Natalie was involved in the ring. When Steve is about to kill Charlie, Natalie intervenes and Charlie is able to kill Steve and turn away the people who have come to remove his other kidney. It seems the end and Charlie is finishing the script when Detective Topo (Henry Silva) comes to meet him and informs him that he has questioned Natalie and she is innocent. Charlie goes out to meet her and sees that she looks identical to the Natalie he traveled with. In the end we hear a telephone conversation between Charlie and his boss (who had sent Charlie to Mexico) and we overhear that his boss has had a kidney transplant.

== Cast ==
- Miguel Ferrer as Charlie Pope
- Leilani Sarelle as Natalie Caldwell (credited as Leilani Sarelle Ferrer)
- Henry Silva as Detective Topo
- Tony Denison as Noel Guzmann (credited as Anthony John Denison)
- Tim Thomerson as Steve Mobley
- Harvey Fierstein as Bob Lakin
- Michael M. Vendrell as Vent
- Matt Clark as Hank
- Randy Walker as Border Guard
- Mario Iván Martínez as Alex
- Angélica Aragón as Dr. Emma
- Juan Antonio Llanes as Hotel Clerk
- José Lavat as Doctor
- Jorge Zepeda as Officer Morales
- Alejandro Bracho as Kind Eyes
- David Villalpando as Cabbie
- Guillermo Ríos as Local
- Abel Woolrich as Toothless Local
- Rafael Conde as Lagno
- Dave Galasso as Pock Marks
- Claire Jacobs as Model #1
- Lisa Harington as Model #2
- George Clooney as Lip-Syncing Transvestite
- Salvador de la Fuente as Van Driver

== Soundtrack ==
Professional ratings
Review scores
Source	Rating
AllMusic	3/5 stars

The soundtrack to the film was played by Dave Allen and Rick Boston and released under the name "The Crash Baptists". The song "One by One" features Belinda Carlisle; World Domination Recordings labelmates Sky Cries Mary contribute "The Elephant Song"; and two tracks are credited to Low Pop Suicide. This record can be considered a side project for Allen and Boston. The album was produced by Michael Vail Blum.
