= Live in Stockholm (Rickie Lee Jones album) =

Live album by Rickie Lee Jones
- Released: July 2011
- Recorded: 7 March 2010
- Genre: Folk rock

Rickie Lee Jones chronology
Balm in Gilead (2009)	Live in Stockholm (2011)	The Devil You Know (2012)

Professional ratings
Review scores
Source	Rating
Mass Live	3/5 stars

Live in Stockholm is a concert film by American singer-songwriter Rickie Lee Jones, released in July 2011. It was filmed on 7 March 2010 at Berns Salonger in Stockholm and it is her first live DVD. This unique concert film was conceived and directed by Grammy nominated director Ian McCrudden (Anita O' Day - The Life of a Jazz Singer). In addition to Jones, this video also featured Lionel Cole (percussion) and Joey Maramba (bass).

== Track listing ==
1. "It Takes You There"
2. "It Must Be Love"
3. "Satellites"
4. "Weasel and the White Boys Cool"
5. "Young Blood"
6. "Sailor Song"
7. "Bonfires"
8. "Second Chance"
9. "Living It Up"
10. "Pirates (So Long Lonely Avenue)"
11. "The Real End"
12. "We Belong Together"
13. "Wild Girl"
14. "Chuck E's in Love"
15. "Danny's All-Star Joint"

== Personnel ==
- Rickie Lee Jones – vocals, guitars, piano
- Joey Maramba – bass guitar
- Lionel Cole – drums, percussions
