= Neon Maniacs =

- French-language theatrical poster by Enzo Sciotti
- Directed by: Joseph Mangine
- Written by: Mark Patrick Carducci
- Produced by: Steven Mackler; Christopher Arnold
- Starring: Alan Hayes; Leilani Sarelle
- Cinematography: Oliver Wood; Joseph Mangine
- Edited by: Timothy Snell
- Music by: Kendall Schmidt
- Production companies: Cimarron Productions; Kelly Park Associates
- Distributed by: Bedford Entertainment
- Release date: November 14, 1986
- Running time: 91 minutes
- Country: United States
- Language: English

Neon Maniacs is a 1986 American horror film directed by Joseph Mangine, written by Mark Patrick Carducci, and starring Alan Hayes and Leilani Sarelle. The film was also released under the title Evil Dead Warriors.

== Plot ==
Celebrating her birthday, Natalie and her friends drive to Golden Gate Park. The teens relax, but a group of humanoid monsters, apparently the Neon Maniacs, attack them. The Maniacs slaughter everyone except for Natalie, who hides in the van as it is attacked. A sudden storm drives the creatures off, and she is found by patrolling police officers. She tells the police of her encounter, though they do not believe her. Lieutenant Devin says they will check out the park in the daytime.

At home, Natalie gets a message from her parents, who inform her they will still be on vacation for the next few weeks. Natalie goes for a swim in her pool, narrowly avoiding one of the maniacs. She relaxes on a pool float, falling asleep and having a nightmare where it rains blood. A sudden storm wakes her up.

In the morning, the police investigate the park, finding nothing but an odd green slime, which they send for analysis. Paula, a young horror fan, gets a call from one of her friends, whose father is a police officer. He tells her about Natalie’s situation. At school, Paula tries asking Natalie about what happened, but is rebuffed by Natalie’s friend. During lunch, Natalie gets into a fight with the sister of one of her friends, and the principal suspends her from school.

Paula films a movie with her friends at the local graveyard. At home, Natalie is harassed over the phone by her friend’s distraught parents. Paula travels to the park and collects some of the slime. Steven arrives to deliver groceries as Natalie is suntanning. As he puts the groceries away, he tells her he believes her, and she accepts a date from him.

Paula explores the area near the park, venturing near the Golden Gate Bridge. She finds a group of dead pigeons near a large set of metal doors. She is prevented from investigating further by the police officers who found Natalie. Later that night, the officers are killed by the Maniacs, who emerge from the doorway. Paula sneaks back and secretly films the maniacs with her video camera. One of them trips into a puddle, which melts his hand. He spots Paula, who runs away as a storm starts, driving the maniacs back into their lair. At home, Paula tries reviewing the footage, but it is rendered blurry by the rain. She tries calling Natalie, but she is not home.

Heading to the movies, Steven and Natalie take the subway train, where they are attacked by the maniacs. They flee to a nearby out of service bus and convince the bus driver to take them. They are again attacked by the maniacs, one of whom has an arm taken off by the closing window. The arm is still alive, and attacks Steven and Natalie until it is thrown out the window.

Lieutenant Devin calls one of the other police detectives, telling him to put a tail on Natalie, as well as saying forensics cannot identify the slime. The Maniac who spotted Paula tries killing her at her home, but she defeats him by spraying him with water, causing him to dissolve. She tells Steven and Natalie, showing them the lair, and they decide to arm the students at the battle of the bands with water guns.

During the battle of the bands, the Maniacs attack the school, killing several students as well as the police detective tailing Natalie, but Steven and Paula manage to kill some of the Maniacs, who are driven off. The parents of the missing students head to the police station to demand that the detectives take action.

The police and fire department head to where the Maniacs spawn from, but leave when they find the building empty. Lieutenant Devin stays behind, and is killed by a Scavenger, who drags him into a portal emerging from the back of a truck. As the heroes drive away, Steven advises Paula to keep her water pistol, as the rain won’t last forever.

== Cast ==
Actor / Actress	Character
Alan Hayes	Steven
Leilani Sarelle	Natalie Lorne
Andrew Divoff	Doc
P.R. Paul	Eugene
Victor Brandt	Lieutenant Devin
Doyle McCurley	Samurai Warrior
John Lafayette	Thomas
Barry Buchanan	Archer
Mark Twogood	Decapitator
Matthew Asner	Stringbean
Trish Doolan	Donna
Joel-Steven Hammond	Slasher
Bo Sabato	Manello
Jessie Lawrence Ferguson	Carson
Donna Locke	Paula Peterson
David Muir	Wylie
Jeff Tyler	Wally
Marta Kober	Lorraine
John Lafayette	Thomas
Gene Bicknell	Cozzie
Chuck Hemingway	Gary
James Acheson	Ray
Dick Frattali	Alex Peterson
Teri Ralston	Marilyn Peterson
Scott Guetzkow	Juice
Jerome L. Dennae	Scavengers
Clarke Coleman	Kid Biker
Zac Baldwin	Punk Biker
Douglas Markell	Axe

== Production ==
Filming took place in Los Angeles. Some scenes were filmed in Hollywood High School.
