= Iron Man (soundtrack) =

Iron Man (Original Motion Picture Soundtrack)

Film score by Ramin Djawadi
- Released: May 6, 2008
- Studios: AIR; Remote Control
- Genres: Orchestra; rock
- Length: 54:02
- Label: Lions Gate
- Producers: Hans Zimmer; Ramin Djawadi

Ramin Djawadi chronology
Deception (2008)	Iron Man (2008)	Open Season 2 (2008)

Iron Man (Original Motion Picture Soundtrack) is the soundtrack album for Iron Man, a 2008 American superhero film based on the Marvel Comics character Iron Man that was produced by Marvel Studios. The album primarily features an original film score composed by Ramin Djawadi, and was released by Lions Gate Music on May 6, 2008.

Director Jon Favreau wanted a rock and roll approach for the score, differing from previous superhero films. Djawadi was hired after filming was completed, and due to time constraints he worked with various composers at Hans Zimmer's Remote Control Productions to complete the music. A rock band was recorded at Remote Control, with Aaron Kaplan and Tom Morello playing electric guitar. This was mixed with an orchestra recorded at AIR Studios in London. The soundtrack album also includes Jack Urbont's previously unreleased Iron Man theme song from the animated series The Marvel Super Heroes (1966), and a new big band-style arrangement of that theme by John O'Brien and Rick Boston.

The album received criticism for the simplistic music and Remote Control's approach. Some reviewers found the combination of rock and orchestra to be successful and appropriate for the film, and the inclusion of Urbont's 1966 theme and the new arrangement was praised. The album was nominated for best score at the 51st Grammy Awards.

== Background ==
Iron Man is an American superhero film based on the Marvel Comics character Iron Man. It was produced by Marvel Studios, directed by Jon Favreau, and written by the teams of Mark Fergus & Hawk Ostby and Art Marcum & Matt Holloway. The film stars Robert Downey Jr. as world-famous industrialist and master engineer Tony Stark, who builds a mechanized suit of armor to escape from captivity by a terrorist group and then uses the suit to become the superhero Iron Man. Composer John Debney was considered for the film after working on Favreau's previous two films, Elf (2003) and Zathura (2005), but "circumstances didn't work out" for him to join the project; Debney later reunited with Favreau for the sequel, Iron Man 2 (2010). Ramin Djawadi was hired instead. A fan of the comics as a child, he sought out the role after hearing that a composer had not yet been selected. Filming was already completed by the time he joined. Iron Man was released in the United States on May 2, 2008, as the first film in Phase One of the Marvel Cinematic Universe (MCU).

== Production ==
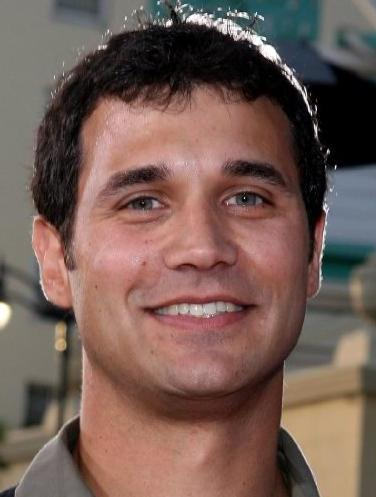
Iron Man composer Ramin Djawadi

Djawadi initially expected to compose a traditional orchestral score similar to those of previous superhero films, such as the Batman film series and the Spider-Man film trilogy. In their first discussions, Favreau told the composer that he wanted to take the music in a completely different direction than those previous superhero films and instead be inspired by the rock and roll genre and bands like AC/DC. Favreau felt Stark was more of a rock star than a superhero, and specifically asked for Djawadi to emphasize electric guitars in the score alongside the orchestra.

Because he was so excited to be working on the film, Djawadi began writing music as soon as he saw the trailer, before completed footage was provided for him to score. Favreau visited Djawadi to hear these ideas whenever he could. For sequences with a lot of visual effects to create the Iron Man suit, Djawadi would sometimes try to hold off until as late as possible so he could see the finished effects before writing the music, but other times he would start writing the music earlier and this influenced some of Favreau's editing decisions. Djawadi began his musical career as a guitarist and, unusually for a film score, he wrote most of the themes for Iron Man using the guitar, ensuring they would work for that instrument as well as the orchestra. There are several different themes for the title character to represent his different moods, including Iron Man's "kick ass" theme which features a machine-like rhythmic pattern; and a theme for Stark's playboy persona. Djawadi said the film was "setting up the Iron Man character" and he tried to do the same with the music, which was inspired by Downey's performance rather than any specific comics. He wrote additional themes that are "not so much character based, but rather plot based that carry you through the movie", and hoped to further develop his musical ideas in a sequel.

Djawadi worked with a team rather than writing all the music himself, which he attributed to time constraints and constant changes being made to the film throughout post-production. He was working at Hans Zimmer's Santa Monica-based film scoring company Remote Control Productions, where he started under Zimmer and other composers providing additional music for such films as Pirates of the Caribbean: The Curse of the Black Pearl (2003) and Batman Begins (2005). For Iron Man, Djawadi followed the same "very efficient" process as Zimmer, using various Remote Control composers to create unique sounds and write additional music and arrangements. Marvel Studios executive Jeremy Latcham said the studio was unsure about Favreau's plans for the rock-inspired score and Djawadi had "struggled to nail down the sound", until a session with "all the Remote Control guys" including Djawadi, Zimmer, and Steve Jablonsky where "the score started to come together". This included experiments using buzzsaws to make music. A rock band was recorded at Remote Control, with Aaron Kaplan playing electric guitar for most of the score. Favreau's friend Tom Morello of the rock band Rage Against the Machine also played electric guitar for the score, in addition to making a cameo appearance in the film. The orchestra was recorded at AIR Studios in London, conducted by Gavin Greenaway, while the final score was mixed at Remote Control.

== Release ==
The soundtrack album was released by Lions Gate Music—which had a licensing deal with Marvel Entertainment at the time—on May 6, 2008, on CD and digital formats. In addition to selections from Djawadi's score, it includes: Jack Urbont's previously unreleased Iron Man theme song from the animated series The Marvel Super Heroes (1966); a big band-style arrangement of that theme by Favreau's previous collaborators John O'Brien and Rick Boston, which is heard when Stark is in a casino; and the song "Institutionalized" by hardcore punk band Suicidal Tendencies, whose lead vocalist Mike Muir went to school with Downey.

== Critical response ==
Professional ratings
Review scores
Source	Rating
AllMusic	3/5 stars
Empire	3/5 stars
FilmMusic.com	4.5/5 stars
Filmtracks	1/5 stars
IGN	7.5/10 stars
Movie Music UK	1.5/5 stars
Movie Wave	0/5 stars
Tracksounds	6/10 stars

Christian Clemmensen of Filmtracks gave the score one star out of five and called it "all style and no substance", with criticism for the Remote Control approach of simplistic music and multiple additional composers working together. Clemmensen questioned Djawadi's claims about developing musical ideas throughout the film, and said the addition of an orchestra was undermined by the sound mix which gave it "a harsh, semi-synthetic edge"; he felt a rock band and keyboard alone would have achieved similar results. Jonathan Broxton at Movie Music UK similarly criticized the score as simplistic, finding it to be "another mediocre Zimmer knock-off" that was not good as film music or as rock music. He gave the soundtrack one-and-a-half stars out of five. James Southall of Movie Wave gave the score no stars, calling it "abysmal" and "another phoned-in score from Hans Zimmer's underlings". All three critics lamented the growing popularity of Remote Control's scores and similar music for big budget films.

Reviewing for AllMusic, James Christopher Monger was more positive about the score, giving it three stars out of five. He felt Djawadi had used a "predictably heavy hand", and compared the results to Metallica's S&M album which combined the heavy metal band's music with orchestral arrangements for the San Francisco Symphony. Kat Brown at Empire also gave three stars out of five and said the best parts of the score were the "joyously over-the-top metal" tracks that Djawadi wrote for the Iron Man scenes, while quieter parts of the score did not leave an impression. IGN's Sophia Tong similarly said the quieter tracks did not leave an impression, with melodies that were not developed. Tong felt Djawadi was successful at combining the rock and orchestral elements for the action tracks, and was able to "keep the action going" without detracting from Favreau's storytelling which made for a good experience in the film but a forgettable listen with the album. She gave the latter a "good" score of seven-and-a-half out of ten.

Christopher Coleman at Tracksounds said he was prepared to dislike the score due to the electric guitar and Remote Control's influence, but he actually felt it was an "industrially-clever diversion" for people willing to listen. He said Djawadi avoided crossing the line into "abrasive and unlistenable", and believed a more traditional orchestral score would not have worked for this film. Coleman graded the album six out of ten. For FilmMusic.com, Thomas Simpson gave a very positive review, praising the score as "a romp of power and adrenaline" which he felt was appropriate for the title character. Simpson gave the score four-and-a-half out of five stars and said it featured "over the top [music] that just made the [film] ten times better" in the same way that Zimmer and Klaus Badelt did for Pirates of the Caribbean.

Brown said Iron Man fans would "relish" the inclusion of the 1966 theme on the album. Tong agreed that it was a great idea to include the "jazzy and somewhat corny" track, and praised the O'Brien and Boston arrangement as "fun, upbeat and very fitting for the modern version of Tony Stark". Coleman said the use of the 1966 theme was one of the best surprises in the film, and the new arrangement was only outdone by the inclusion of Urbont's original version on the album. Clemmensen said the original theme was "diametrically opposed to the Remote Control handbook" and he was disappointed that none of the film's composers had attempted to interpolate it into the actual score. In contrast, he felt "Institutionalized" was "terribly irritating and stupid". Coleman also criticized that song's inclusion, as did Tong who said it was "a bit much".

== Track listing ==
All music by Ramin Djawadi, except where noted.

Track listing
No.	Title	Music	Length
1.	"Driving with the Top Down"		3:09
2.	"Iron Man" (2008 version)	John O'Brien and Rick Boston	1:05
3.	"Merchant of Death"		2:14
4.	"Trinkets to Kill a Prince"		3:07
5.	"Mark I"		3:53
6.	"Fireman"		2:09
7.	"Vacation's Over"		3:34
8.	"Golden Egg"		4:12
9.	"Damn Kid"	DJ Boborobo	1:12
10.	"Mark II"		2:47
11.	"Extra Dry, Extra Olives"		1:43
12.	"Iron Man"		3:30
13.	"Gulmira"		4:05
14.	"Are Those Bullet Holes?"		2:00
15.	"Section 16"		2:33
16.	"Iron Monger"		4:45
17.	"Arc Reaktor"		3:55
18.	"Institutionalized"	Suicidal Tendencies	3:49
19.	"Iron Man" (1966 version)	Jack Urbont	0:20
Total length:			54:02

== Personnel ==
Credits adapted from the album's liner notes.

- Ramin Djawadi – composer, score producer
- Hans Zimmer – score producer
- Jon Favreau – executive soundtrack producer
- Kevin Feige – executive soundtrack producer
- Dave Jordan – executive soundtrack producer
- Ryeland Allison – additional composer, arranger, drums
- Lorne Balfe – additional composer, arranger
- Clay Duncan – additional composer, arranger
- Atli Örvarsson – additional composer, arranger
- Bobby Tahouri – additional composer, arranger
- Rob Simon – ambient music designer
- Stephen Coleman – orchestrator
- Matt Dunkley – additional orchestrator
- Gavin Greenaway – score conductor
- Greg Ellis – percussion, dulcimer
- Aaron Kaplan – electric guitar
- Tom Morello – electric guitar
- Martin Tillman – electric cello
- Geoff Foster – recording engineer
- Slamm Andrews – additional recording engineer
- Jeff Biggers – additional recording engineer
- Chris Barrett – sound engineer
- Adam Miller – sound engineer
- Shannon Erbe – music editor
- David Klotz – music editor
- Alan Meyerson – score mixer
- Gavin Lurssen – mastering engineer

== Charts ==
Chart performance for Iron Man (Original Motion Picture Soundtrack)
Chart (2008)	Peak position
UK Soundtrack Albums (Official Charts)	28

== Accolades ==
Accolades received by Iron Man (Original Motion Picture Soundtrack)
Award	Date of ceremony	Category	Recipient	Result	Ref.
ASCAP Film and Television Music Awards	May 11, 2009	Top Box Office Films	Ramin Djawadi	Honored (Note: ASCAP's Top Box Office Films category honors various composers of the year's most performed film music.)	
Grammy Awards	February 8, 2009	Best Score Soundtrack Album for Motion Picture, Television or Other Visual Media	Ramin Djawadi	Nominated	
Saturn Awards	June 25, 2009	Best Music	Ramin Djawadi	Nominated	

== Additional music ==
The following are noteworthy songs that are featured in the film but not included in the soundtrack album:

- "Back in Black" by AC/DC:
  The film opens with Stark traveling in an army convoy, making jokes and listening to "Back in Black". This was seen to be aligned with Favreau's goal to make a "rock and roll" superhero film. Latcham felt this music choice was critical in helping to immediately establish Stark's character and attitude for the audience, showing him to be "a cool guy who [is] kind of a loose cannon".
- "Slept On Tony With Dirt" by Ghostface Killah:
  This is an original rap song about Iron Man that is heard during a party on Stark's private jet. Ghostface Killah has used the aliases "Ironman" and "Tony Starks", and his debut album is Ironman (1996), all inspired by the Marvel Comics character. The rapper also made a cameo appearance in a different party scene that was cut from the film but included as a deleted scene on the home media release.
- "Iron Man" by Black Sabbath:
  While this song is not related to the Marvel Comics character, Favreau wanted to include it as a "wink" to the audience. Latcham added, "We knew we needed 'Iron Man' by Black Sabbath for the bit." Some Marvel executives were reluctant to spend the large amount of money needed to license the song for the film's panel at San Diego Comic-Con, and it was not common at the time for music to be specifically licensed for such an event. Latcham fought for it, arguing: "If you put the Black Sabbath song in the piece, it's cool. If you don't, it's not cool." The song was ultimately licensed for the panel, the trailers, and the end credits.

== See also ==
- Music of the Marvel Cinematic Universe
- Iron Man 2 (soundtrack)
- Iron Man 3 (soundtrack)
