= Pieces of Treasure =

Studio album by Rickie Lee Jones
- Released: April 28, 2023
- Recorded: 2022
- Studio: Sear Sound, New York City
- Genre: Jazz
- Length: 34:05
- Label: BMG, Modern Recordings

Rickie Lee Jones chronology
Kicks (2019)	Pieces of Treasure (2023)

Pieces of Treasure (The Duchess of Coolsville) is the fifteenth studio album by American singer-songwriter Rickie Lee Jones. It was released on April 28, 2023, by BMG/Modern Recordings. The album consists of ten covers of songs from the Great American Songbook. The album was produced by Russ Titelman, who co-produced Jones' 1979 self-titled debut album and its follow-up Pirates (1981).

The album earned Jones a nomination for Best Traditional Pop Vocal Album at the 66th Annual Grammy Awards.

== Background and recording ==
Work commenced on the album when Jones and Titelman, who produced Jones' first two albums, Rickie Lee Jones (1979) and Pirates (1981), began having phone conversations and lunch meetups, with Titelman repeatedly presenting to Jones of the idea of making a jazz album. The album was recorded over five days at Sear Sound studios in Midtown Manhattan.

== Singles ==
The album's lead single, "Just in Time", was released on January 20, 2023. The second single, "September Song", was released on February 24, 2023. The third single, "Nature Boy", was released on March 24, 2023.

== Track listing ==
Pieces of Treasure track listing
No.	Title	Writer(s)	Length
1.	"Just in Time"	Jule Styne; Betty Comden; Adolph Green	3:11
2.	"There Will Never Be Another You"	Harry Warren; Mack Gordon	3:20
3.	"Nature Boy"	Eden Ahbez	3:26
4.	"One for My Baby (and One More for the Road)"	Harold Arlen; Johnny Mercer	4:16
5.	"They Can't Take That Away from Me"	George Gershwin; Ira Gershwin	2:50
6.	"All the Way"	Jimmy Van Heusen; Sammy Cahn	2:31
7.	"Here's That Rainy Day"	Jimmy Van Heusen; Johnny Burke	4:08
8.	"September Song"	Kurt Weill; Maxwell Anderson	4:44
9.	"On the Sunny Side of the Street"	Jimmy McHugh; Dorothy Fields	2:53
10.	"It's All in the Game"	Charles G. Dawes; Carl Sigman	2:46
Total length:			34:05

== Charts ==
Chart performance for Pieces of Treasure
Chart (2023)	Peak position
German Albums (Offizielle Top 100)	48
Scottish Albums (OCC)	60
UK Independent Albums (OCC)	25
US Top Album Sales (Billboard)	71
