= It's Like This =

Studio album by Rickie Lee Jones
- Released: September 12, 2000
- Genres: Pop, rock
- Label: Artemis
- Producers: Rickie Lee Jones, Bruce Brody

Rickie Lee Jones chronology
Ghostyhead (1997)	It's Like This (2000)	Live at Red Rocks (2001)

Professional ratings
Review scores
Source	Rating
AllMusic	3/5 stars
Robert Christgau	(1-star Honorable Mention)
The Encyclopedia of Popular Music	3/5 stars
Entertainment Weekly	A−
The New Rolling Stone Album Guide	3/5 stars

It's Like This is an album by the American singer/songwriter Rickie Lee Jones, released in 2000. Like her 1991 album Pop Pop, it is a covers record. The album was nominated for a 2001 Best Pop Traditional Record Grammy Award.

== Critical reception ==
The Washington Post wrote that "the album's most successful track is Jones's sinewy reading of Steely Dan's edgy missive, 'Show Biz Kids', [which] kicks off with just terse triangle and Richard Davis's snaky bass, with Jones tapping into the caustic detachment and cool cynicism the song's writers always intended."

== Track listing ==
1. "Show Biz Kids" (Donald Fagen, Walter Becker) – 4:35
2. "Trouble Man" (Marvin Gaye) – 5:12
3. "For No One" (John Lennon, Paul McCartney) – 2:32
4. "Smile" (Charlie Chaplin, Geoffrey Parsons, John Turner) – 1:49
5. "The Low Spark of High Heeled Boys" (Jim Capaldi, Steve Winwood) – 5:13
6. "On the Street Where You Live" (Alan Jay Lerner, Frederick Loewe) – 3:26
7. "I Can't Get Started" (Vernon Duke, Ira Gershwin) – 4:30
8. "Up a Lazy River" (Hoagy Carmichael, Sidney Arodin) – 2:50
9. "Someone to Watch Over Me" (George Gershwin, Ira Gershwin) – 2:03
10. "Cycles" (Gayle Caldwell) – 3:16
11. "One Hand, One Heart" (Leonard Bernstein) – 1:58

== Personnel ==
- Rickie Lee Jones – vocals, guitar, organ
- Bruce Brody – organ
- John Pizzarelli – acoustic guitar
- Alex Foster – saxophone
- Jeff Dellisanti – bass clarinet
- Conrad Herwig – trombone
- Richard Davis – acoustic bass
- Paul Nowinski – acoustic bass
- Mike Elizondo – acoustic bass
- Peter Erskine – drums
- Carl Allen – drums
- Rick Marotta – drums
- Bashiri Johnson – percussion
- Joe Jackson – piano, backing vocals on "Show Biz Kids", and "For No One"
- Ben Folds – piano on "Low Spark of High Heeled Boys", duet vocal "One Hand, One Heart"
- Ben Folds, Dan Hicks, Taj Mahal – backing vocals on "Up a Lazy River"

Technical

- Ben Sidran – co-producer (tracks: 1, 6–8, 10)
- Barry Goldberg, James Farber, Larry Alexander, Rob Smith – engineer
- Lee Cantelon – art direction, photography

== Chart positions ==
Year	Chart	Position
2000	Billboard 200	148
2000	Top Internet albums	10
2001	Top Independent albums	42
