= Leilani Sarelle =

American actress

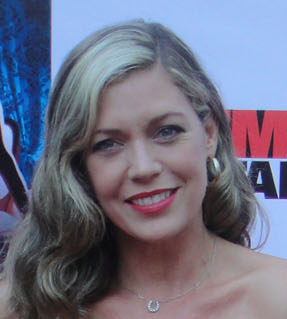
- Sarelle in 2012.
- Occupation: Actress
- Years active: 1985–present

Leilani Sarelle is an American actress. She is best known for her role as Roxy in the 1992 film Basic Instinct.

== Career ==
Sarelle has been acting in films since 1985. In 1992, she played Roxy, Sharon Stone's character's lover, in Basic Instinct.

== Filmography ==
=== Film ===
Year	Title	Role	Notes
1986	Neon Maniacs	Natalie	
1989	Shag	Suette	
1990	Days of Thunder	Female Highway Patrol Officer	
1992	Basic Instinct	Roxy	
1992	Little Sister	Catherine	
1993	The Harvest	Natalie Caldwell	Credited as Leilani Sarelle Ferrer
1995	Breach of Trust	Madeline	
2010	Resonance	The Woman	Short
2011	Breakin' Till Dawn	TV Producer	Short
2012	For the Love of Money	Nancy	
2012	Night Claws	Sarah Evans	
2013	5 Hour Friends	Mab	
2015	Midlife	Victoria Brooks	
2015	Relentless Justice	Victoria De Vries	
2016	Black Road	Lisa	
TBA	The American Way		

=== Television ===
Year	Title	Role	Notes
1985	Highway to Heaven	Girl	Episode: "The Secret"
1986	Remington Steele	People Magazine Reporter	Episode: "Steele on the Air"
1986	The Deliberate Stranger	Ted groupie at restaurant	Television film
1987	Glory Years		Television film
1989	Tour of Duty	Dollie	Episode: "A Necessary End"
1989	L.A. Law	Cheryl Flecksor	Episode: "Lie Down and Deliver"
1989	The Famous Teddy Z		Episode: "Season's Greetings from Al Floss"
1990	The Young Riders	Clara Enright	Episode: "Matched Pair"
1990	The Outsiders	TC	Episode: "Union Blues"
1990	Dream On	Cindy	Episode: "Doing the Bossa Nova"
1991	Checkered Flag	Jerri Simpson	Television film
1992	Till Death Us Do Part	Gloria Keene	Television film
1993	Barbarians At The Gate	Laurie Johnson	Television film
1995	Sketch Artist II: Hands That See	Vicki Rosenthal	Television film Credited as Leilani Ferrer
2005	Sleeper Cell	Westside Mom	Episode: "Soldier"
2009	The Unit	Pauline Charest	Episode: "Best Laid Plans"
2010	The Mentalist	Giselle Dublin	Episode: "Red Sky at Night"
2012	Glee	Mrs. Tennison	Episode: "Big Brother"
2012	Femme Fatales	Veronica Flood	Episode: "Trophy Wife"
