= Sugar Plant =

Japanese band

Sugar Plant is a Japanese dream pop band. Unlike most rock music, their music is generally slow, mellow and melodic, in the vein of similar American "slowcore" groups such as Galaxie 500, Bedhead, or Low.

The band consists of vocalist Chinatsu Shoyama and guitarist Shin'ichi Ogawa; the band also usually includes a keyboardist and drummer, these roles being filled by a changing roster of musicians. Chinatsu and Shin'ichi formed the band in 1993, while they were studying at university. The band's name comes from a sugar factory in Kawasaki, Kanagawa.

Sugar Plant has released their recordings on the record labels like Pop Narcotic, Pony Canyon, World Domination Recordings, Wonder Release Records, Hot-Cha Records, Mango Knife Music, KiliKiliVilla, etc.

== Discography ==
Studio albums

- Hiding Place (1995)
- Trance Mellow (1996)
- After After Hours (1997)
- Dryfruit (2000)
- Headlights (2018)
- One Dream, One Star (2026)

Extended plays (EPs)

- Cage of the Sun (1996)
- Happy (1998)
- Another Headlights (2019)
