= Ayin Es =

American artist

Ayin Es (born July 20, 1968) is a self-taught visual artist, writer, musician (drummer), and book artist from Los Angeles, California. They have written articles for Coagula Art Journal and the Huffington Post. As a musician, they played for 20 years as an R&B drummer touring and recording drums with various artists. They played drums on Rickie Lee Jones' Ghostyhead album in 1997.

Their artists' books are featured in the J. Paul Getty Trust Research Institute Library in Los Angeles, National Museum of Women in the Arts, Brooklyn Museum, Centre Georges Pompidou in Paris, and also in prominent university collections such as the Arthur and Mata Jaffe Collection at Florida Atlantic University Library, UC Irvine, Otis College of Art & Design, and the UCLA Library Special Collections.

Es' mixed media paintings have exhibited at the Riverside Art Museum, Torrance Art Museum in Torrance, California, and the Craft and Folk Art Museum.

Es is the recipient of a Pollock-Krasner Foundation Fellowship Award, two Durfee Foundation ARC Grants, and was awarded the 2014 Wynn Newhouse Award.

As a visual artist, Es is known for creating personal narratives. They have used past experience to fuel their subject matter, transforming a broken history into a positive and spiritual resolve. Candid experiences are laid bare and forged directly into their paintings, drawings, soft sculptures, mixed media installations, and handmade books. In 2015, Los Angeles Art Critic Peter Frank wrote: "An autodidact, Es has long embodied [their] interests and [their] struggles - in painted and drawn and even sculpted and sewn imagery - darkly whimsical forms and figures whose deft fluidity have the eye 'going for a walk with a line' (in the words of Paul Klee, who strongly influenced Es) but aggressively trouble the mind."

In 2010, Los Angeles art critic A. Moret wrote: "The viewer activates the past as Es rewrites the story by mending a broken history and constructing a new narrative. ... Es has transformed the past that once plagued [their] existence into [their] raison d' être."

Es' artwork has been reviewed in LA Weekly, Artillery Magazine, Art LTD, ArtScene Magazine, Whitehot Magazine, Jewish Journal, the Huffington Post, ArtNowLA, and in a 2022 VoyageLA interview. They have been represented by Shulamit Gallery in Venice, California, and George Billis Gallery in Los Angeles and are currently represented by Craig Krull Gallery in Santa Monica, CA. Ayin published their memoir, Shrapnel in the San Fernando Valley in April 2019 for which they won the Bruce Geller Memorial Prize, and were interviewed in LA Weekly.

In 2021, the artist came out as transqueer/nonbinary and changed their name to Ayin.
