= Naked Songs – Live and Acoustic =

Live album by Rickie Lee Jones
- Released: September 19, 1995
- Recorded: 1994
- Length: 69:26
- Label: Reprise
- Producer: Russ Titelman; Rickie Lee Jones

Rickie Lee Jones chronology
Traffic from Paradise (1993)	Naked Songs – Live and Acoustic (1995)	Ghostyhead (1997)

Professional ratings
Review scores
Source	Rating
AllMusic	4.5/5 stars
The Austin Chronicle	4/5 stars

Naked Songs – Live and Acoustic is a live album by the American singer–songwriter Rickie Lee Jones, released in October 1995 via Reprise Records. It reached No. 121 on the Billboard 200 chart.

== Track listing ==
All tracks composed by Rickie Lee Jones; except where noted

1. "The Horses" (Jones, Walter Becker)
2. "Weasel and the White Boys Cool" (Jones, Alfred Johnson)
3. "Altar Boy"
4. "It Must Be Love"
5. "Young Blood"
6. "The Last Chance Texaco"
7. "Skeletons"
8. "Magazine"
9. "Living It Up"
10. "We Belong Together"
11. "Coolsville"
12. "Flying Cowboys" (Jones, Sal Bernardi, Pascal Nabet Meyer)
13. "Stewart's Coat"
14. "Chuck E.'s in Love"
15. "Autumn Leaves" (Johnny Mercer, Jacques Prévert, Joseph Kosma)

== Personnel ==
- Rickie Lee Jones – vocals, acoustic guitar, piano
- Rob Wasserman – bass on "Chuck E's in Love" and "Autumn Leaves"

Technical

- Dan Kasting, Derek Featherstone – live recording engineers
- John Beverly Jones, Mark Linett, Steve Boyer – mixing
- Lee Cantelon – art direction, design, photography
