= Girl at Her Volcano =

EP by Rickie Lee Jones
- Released: 1983
- Recorded: December 4, 1978–March 8, 1983
- Genre: Soul; vocal jazz
- Length: LP: 22:58; MC/CD: 28:33
- Label: Warner Bros.
- Producer: Rickie Lee Jones

Rickie Lee Jones chronology
Pirates (1981)	Girl at Her Volcano (1983)	The Magazine (1984)

Professional ratings
Review scores
Source	Rating
AllMusic	3.5/5 stars

Girl at Her Volcano is a 10" or 12" vinyl EP consisting mainly of cover versions, and the third release by musician Rickie Lee Jones.

== Overview ==
After touring through much of 1982 following the release of Pirates, Rickie Lee Jones released the Girl at Her Volcano EP. It contains three live recordings, a few new studio ones and recordings left over from earlier studio sessions. "Hey, Bub" was the first song originally written by Jones for Pirates in September 1979.

The live recording of "Something Cool" was not included on the original vinyl EP release, but on the Musicassette release of the same year and later on CD pressings. Earlier recordings of this song can be found on June Christy's 1954 album Something Cool, and Julie London's 1960 album Around Midnight (which features also "Lush Life"). Other cover versions on the EP include the Left Banke's "Walk Away Renée" (famously covered by the Four Tops), the Drifters' classic "Under the Boardwalk", the American songbook standard "My Funny Valentine" and the little-known Lani Hall original "So Long".

== Track listing ==
1. "Lush Life" (Billy Strayhorn) – 5:29 - Recorded live at Perkins Palace, Pasadena, CA, April 17, 1982 - Michael Ruff (piano), Reggie McBride (bass), Tony Braunagel (drums)
2. "Letter from the 9th Ward / Walk Away Renée" (Rickie Lee Jones / Michael Brown, Tony Sansone, Bob Calilli) – 4:28 - Recorded March 1, 1983 - Michael Fisher (percussion), Michael Ruff, Michael Boddicker, Rickie Lee Jones (synthesizers), Reggie McBride (bass)
3. "Hey, Bub" (Rickie Lee Jones) – 2:20 - Recorded January 20, 1983 - Michael Boddicker, Rickie Lee Jones (synthesizers).
4. "My Funny Valentine" (Richard Rodgers, Lorenz Hart) – 3:51 - Recorded live at The Roxy, Los Angeles, April 18, 1982 - Michael Ruff (piano)
5. "Under the Boardwalk" (Arthur Resnick, Kenny Young) – 3:23 - Recorded March 8, 1983 - Victor Feldman (percussion, marimba), Lenny Castro (congas, triple scale); Leslie Smith, Michael Ruff, Arno Lucas, Sal Bernardi (vocalizing)
6. "Rainbow Sleeves" (Tom Waits) – 3:41 - Recorded December 4, 1978 - Randy Kerber (piano), strings arranged by Johnny Mandel
7. "So Long" (Neil Larsen, Lani Hall) – 2:06 - Neil Larsen (Fender Rhodes), Michael Ruff (vocals), Earle Dumler (oboe)
8. "Something Cool" (Bill Barnes) – 3:49 - Bonus track on 1983 Musicassette release only, and 1990 CD release - Recorded live at Theater Carré, Amsterdam, September 3, 1979 - Neil Larsen, Lyle Mays (keyboards), Lenny Castro (percussion)

== Personnel ==
Studio Rhythm Section:

- Rickie Lee Jones – lead vocals, piano, synthesizer
- Reggie McBride – bass
- Michael Ruff – Fender Rhodes
- Dean Parks – guitar
- Victor Feldman – percussion, marimba
- Nathan East – bass
- Art Rodriguez – drums
- Michael Boddicker – synthesizer
- Mike Fisher – percussion
- Lenny Castro – congas
- Randy Kerber – piano
- Tony Braunagel – drums

Horns:

- Chuck Findley – trumpet
- Larry Williams – tenor saxophone
- Earl Dannar – oboe

Strings:

- Eddie Karam – conductor
- Harry Bluestone – concertmaster
- Frank DeCaro – string contractor
- Nick DeCaro – strings and horn arrangements (except "Rainbow Sleeves")

== Recording notes ==
- Engineered and mixed by Mark Linett at Warner Bros. Recording Studios (Amigo) using 3M Digital System
- Second engineers: Margaret Gwynne, Ken Tract
- "So Long" and "Rainbow Sleeves" were originally recorded by Lee Herschberg
- Production Assistance: JoAnn Tominaga, Annie Streer, Mark Linett, Steve Baker, Karen Appere, Liz Rosenberg
- Mobile Recording facilities "courtesy" Record Plant
- Additional Recording at Jennifudy Studios, L.A.
- Digitally Mastered by Bobby Hata at Warner Bros. Recording Studios
- Album design by Rickie Lee Jones and Jeri McManus
- Cover drawing by Rickie Lee Jones
- Back cover photography by Craig Dietz
- “Champion to the Teninch Protagonist”: Bob Regehr
- “Here is "Valentine," to my father, memories hurling these songs under her volcano”
