= The Sermon on Exposition Boulevard =

Studio album by Rickie Lee Jones
- Released: 6 February 2007
- Recorded: 2005
- Studio: Sunset Sound
- Genre: Folk rock
- Length: 53:47
- Label: New West
- Producer: Lee Cantelon, Peter Atanasoff, Rob Schnapf

Rickie Lee Jones chronology
Rickie Lee Jones: Duchess of Coolsville (2005)	The Sermon on Exposition Boulevard (2007)	Balm in Gilead (2009)

Professional ratings
Review scores
Source	Rating
Allmusic	4.5/5 stars
Q	3/5 stars

The Sermon on Exposition Boulevard is an album by American singer-songwriter Rickie Lee Jones, released in February 2007 on the independent New West label. It was produced by Lee Cantelon, Peter Atanasoff and Rob Schnapf, additional production by Bernie Larsen.

It was inspired by Lee Cantelon's book The Words, which contains the essential teachings of Jesus rewritten for a modern audience.

A special edition was also released, with an expanded booklet, a 5.1 surround mix, a Super Audio CD version of the record, MP3 copies of the album, and a 50-minute DVD that documents the project from its beginning.

== Track listing ==
1. "Nobody Knows My Name" (Rickie Lee Jones, Lee Cantelon, Peter Atanasoff) – 3:24
2. "Gethsemane" (Jones, Atanasoff) – 2:23
3. "Falling Up" (Jones, Atanasoff) – 4:39
4. "Lamp of the Body" (Jones, Atanasoff) – 2:57
5. "It Hurts" (Jones, Atanasoff) – 3:45
6. "Where I Like It Best" (Jones, Cantelon, Atanasoff) – 5:44
7. "Tried to Be a Man" (Jones) – 3:44
8. "Circle in the Sand" (Jones, Cantelon, Atanasoff, Bernie Larsen) – 3:29
9. "Donkey Ride" (Jones, Atanasoff) – 2:52
10. "7th Day" (Jones) – 3:59
11. "Elvis Cadillac" (Jones, Atanasoff) – 3:57
12. "Road to Emmaus" (Cantelon, Atanasoff) – 4:18
13. "I Was There" (Jones) – 8:21

== Personnel ==
- Rickie Lee Jones – vocals, guitar, keyboards, synthesizer, percussions, toy xylophone, finger cymbals, electric piano, bowed dulcimer, tambourine
- Bernie Larsen – guitar, drums, synthesizer, percussion, vocals, engineer, additional production
- Pete Thomas – guitar
- Rob Schnapf – guitar
- Steve Abagon – guitar
- Peter Atanasoff – guitar, oud, background vocals
- Joey Maramba – bass guitar
- Jay Bellerose – drums
- Joey Waronker – drums
- Lee Cantelon – background vocals
- Jonathan Stearns – trumpet
