= Ghostyhead =

Studio album by Rickie Lee Jones
- Released: June 17, 1997
- Studio: Conway (Los Angeles); Hyde St. (San Francisco)
- Genre: Trip hop
- Length: 55:42
- Label: Reprise; Warner Bros.
- Producer: Rickie Lee Jones; Rick Boston

Rickie Lee Jones chronology
| Naked Songs – Live and Acoustic (1995) | Ghostyhead (1997) | It's Like This (2000) |

Professional ratings
Review scores
| Source | Rating |
|---|---|
| AllMusic | 3/5 stars |
| Chicago Tribune | 2/4 stars |
| Christgau's Consumer Guide | (dud) |
| The Encyclopedia of Popular Music | 3/5 stars |
| Entertainment Weekly | B |
| Los Angeles Times | 3.5/4 stars |
| Rolling Stone | 2/5 stars |

Ghostyhead (stylized as GHoSTYhead) is the seventh studio album by the American musician Rickie Lee Jones. It was released in 1997 on Warner Bros. Records.

== Track listing ==
All tracks composed by Rickie Lee Jones, with additional contributors noted.

1. "Little Yellow Town" – 6:54
2. "Road Kill" – 4:41
3. "Matters" (Lee Cantelon) – 6:04
4. "Firewalker" – 3:56
5. "Howard" (Rick Boston) – 4:45
6. "Ghostyhead" – 5:36
7. "Sunny Afternoon" (Boston) – 3:54
8. "Scary Chinese Movie" – 6:19
9. "Cloud of Unknowing" (Boston) – 7:03
10. "Vessel of Light" (Boston) – 6:30

== Personnel ==
- Rickie Lee Jones – guitar, bass, percussion, organ, piano
- Rick Boston – guitar, bass, percussion, organ, piano, loops, programming
- Boss Doctor – additional programming
- Robert Devery – rhythm, Korg
- John Leftwich – upright bass on "Howard"
- Gerri Sutyak – cello on "Firewalker"
- David Zeller – sheet metal on "Ghostyhead" and "Sunny Afternoon"
- Jay Lane – foot trunk, cymbals on "Firewalker"
- Josh Freese – live drums on "Road Kill"
- Janeen Rae Heller – saw on "Ghostyhead"
- Ayin Es – live drums on "Matters" and "Firewalker"
- Ronnie Siago – live drums on "Howard"
- Lee Cantelon – backward guitar on "Matters"

Technical

- Barry Goldberg – engineer, mixing, artwork
- John Nelson – second engineer, artwork
- Lee Cantelon – artwork, design
- Rickie Lee Jones – poster art
