= The Other Side of Desire =

Studio album by Rickie Lee Jones
- Released: June 23, 2015
- Studio: Music Shed (New Orleans)
- Length: 45:44
- Label: The Other Side of Desire; Thirty Tigers
- Producer: John Porter

Rickie Lee Jones chronology
The Devil You Know (2012)	The Other Side of Desire (2015)	Kicks (2019)

The Other Side of Desire is the thirteenth studio album by American singer-songwriter Rickie Lee Jones. It was released on June 23, 2015, under Jones's own label The Other Side of Desire with distribution handled by Thirty Tigers. The Other Side of Desire is Jones' first album of original material since Balm in Gilead (2009) and it received positive acclaim from music critics.

== Background ==
Jones began writing for the album when she moved back to New Orleans about two years prior and after on-and-off periods of writer's block. The album was recorded at the Music Shed studio in New Orleans with John Porter helming production duties. The album title is also a nod to New Orleans' Desire Street in the Bywater neighborhood.

== Critical reception ==
According to the review aggregator Metacritic, The Other Side of Desire received "universal acclaim" based on a weighted average score of 86 out of 100 from six critic scores. The Guardian rated the album four out of five stars and noted the "few overt homages" to New Orleans in the songs "J'ai Connais Pas" and "Haunted".

== Track listing ==
The Other Side of Desire track listing
No.	Title	Length
1.	"Jimmy Choos"	3:57
2.	"Valtz de mon pere (Lovers' Waltz)"	4:35
3.	"J'ai connais pas"	3:28
4.	"Blinded by the Hunt"	3:24
5.	"Infinity"	5:29
6.	"I Wasn't Here"	4:06
7.	"Christmas in New Orleans"	4:48
8.	"Haunted"	5:22
9.	"Feet on the Ground"	6:05
10.	"Juliette"	1:26
11.	"Finale (A Spider in the Circus of the Falling Star)"	3:04
Total length:		45:44

== Personnel ==
- Rickie Lee Jones – primary artist, liner notes
- John Porter – production, mixing, engineering
- Mark Howard – mixing, engineering
- Casey Contreary – engineering, assistant engineer
- Mike Dorsey – engineering
- Gavin Lurssen – mastering
