= Kicks (Rickie Lee Jones album) =

2019 studio album

Studio album by Rickie Lee Jones
- Released: June 7, 2019
- Studio: New Orleans, Louisiana, US
- Length: 35:56
- Language: English
- Label: TOSOD
- Producer: Mike Dillon; Rickie Lee Jones; Louis Michot ("My Father's Gun")

Rickie Lee Jones chronology
The Other Side of Desire (2015)	Kicks (2019)	Pieces of Treasure (2023)

It is a city that loves itself, that loves the history of its music. When it wakes up in the morning, it sings the songs of itself. It’s kind of like Paris but it’s more about the music. Everywhere you go in this town, you hear the music or you see someone carrying their instrument. Music is this town’s flavor. That’s significant because it was in danger of becoming a Disneyland replica of itself. But they didn’t let that happen. They keep teaching it in schools. It’s authentic… although I hate that word. It emanates from the people who live here. I can’t think of another city so closely identified with its music. Maybe Seville in Spain? There aren’t very many cities made of music.

—Jones on New Orleans, the recording location of Kicks

Kicks is a 2019 studio album by American singer–songwriter Rickie Lee Jones. The collection of cover versions received positive reviews from critics. The collection of songs incorporates jazz, pop, and rock music influences and was Jones' second album recorded with a group of New Orleans–based musicians.

== Reception ==
According to the review aggregator Metacritic, Kicks received "generally favorable reviews" based on a weighted average score of 70 out of 100 from our critic scores. Editors at AllMusic rated this album 3.5 out of 5 stars, with critic Mark Deming writing that "even when the material is familiar, Jones inarguably finds something very much her own in this material" and that the music "feels richly Southern in its comfortably laid back but impassioned tone and in the loose precision of the arrangements". In Glide Magazine, Matthew Barton writing that this album synthesizes Jones' previous covers releases and "Kicks seem to take its lead from all of these records, but perhaps more than any of them it seems to sit more snugly alongside Jones’ own material". Will Hodgkinson of The Times rated this album 4 out of 5 stars, calling it an "appealingly lived-in set of covers" where "she sounds more effortlessly cool than ever".

== Track listing ==
1. "Bad Company" (Simon Kirke and Paul Rodgers) – 5:52
2. "My Father's Gun" (Elton John and Bernie Taupin) – 4:18
3. "Lonely People" (Catherine Peek and Dan Peek) – 3:18
4. "Houston" (Lee Hazlewood) – 3:04
5. "You're Nobody 'Til Somebody Loves You" (James Cavanaugh, Russ Morgan, and Larry Stock) – 2:22
6. "Nagasaki" (Mort Dixon and Harry Warren) – 1:59
7. "Mack the Knife" (Bertolt Brecht and Kurt Weill) – 3:19
8. "Quicksilver Girl" (Steve Miller) – 3:39
9. "The End of the World" (Sylvia Dee and Arthur Kent) – 4:01
10. "Cry" (Churchill Kohlman) – 4:08

== Personnel ==
- Rickie Lee Jones – acoustic guitar, electric guitar, slide guitar, acoustic piano, electric piano, Wurlitzer, tambourine, hand percussion, vocals, production
- Bruce Barielle – mastering
- Doug Belote – drums
- Gina R. Binkley – design
- John Culbreth – trumpet
- Ian Bowman – tenor saxophone
- Mike Dillon – vibraphone, junk drum kit, concert bells, tambourine, congas, concert bass drum, timpani, percussion, snaps, claps, hand percussion, production
- David Easley – pedal steel guitar
- Nick Ellman – baritone saxophone
- John Gross – sousaphone
- Cliff Hines – guitar
- Peregrine Honig – illustration
- Nathan Lambertson – bass guitar, Moog Opus, synth bass, upright bass
- Tiffany Lamson – backing vocals
- Andre Michot – accordion
- Louis Michot – fiddle, production on "My Father's Gun"
- Michael Napolitano – mixing
- Aurora Nealand – clarinet, backing vocals
- John Singleton – upright bass
- Zack Smith – photography
- Shane Theriot – guitar, slide guitar

== See also ==
- 2019 in American music
- List of 2019 albums
