= Chuck E.'s in Love =

Single by Rickie Lee Jones

from the album Rickie Lee Jones
- B-side: "On Saturday Afternoons in 1963"
- Released: April 28, 1979
- Genre: Pop; R&B; jazz
- Length: 3:31
- Label: Warner Bros.
- Songwriter: Rickie Lee Jones
- Producers: Lenny Waronker, Russ Titelman

Rickie Lee Jones singles chronology
"Chuck E.'s in Love" (1979)	"Young Blood" (1979)

Official Audio
- "Chuck E.'s in Love" on YouTube

"Chuck E.'s in Love" is a song by American singer-songwriter Rickie Lee Jones. Released in 1979 on her eponymous debut album Rickie Lee Jones, the song became her biggest hit, reaching number 4 on the Billboard U.S. Hot 100 chart.

"Chuck E.'s in Love" is track 1 on Side One of the Rickie Lee Jones LP, on which it runs 3 minutes and 28 seconds. It is Side A on the single; the B-side is "On Saturday Afternoon in 1963".

== Background and production ==
Jones and her lover and fellow songwriter Tom Waits spent a lot of time hanging out with their friend Chuck E. Weiss at the seedy Tropicana Motel in Los Angeles. Eventually Weiss, affectionately referred to as "Chuck E.", disappeared. Later Weiss called the apartment where Jones and Waits lived. When Waits took the call, Weiss explained that he was in Denver, and that he had moved there because he had fallen in love with a cousin there. When Waits hung up he announced to Jones, "Chuck E.'s in love". Jones liked the sound of the sentence and wrote a song around it.

The first line of the song is, "How come he don't come and P.L.P. with me down at the meter no more?" P.L.P. stands for "public leaning post" and is old American slang for one person, usually female, leaning up against another person, usually male, in a friendly fashion.

Although toward the end of "Chuck E.'s in Love" the lyrics state, "Chuck E.'s in love with the little girl singing this song," the twist ending is fictional; Jones was never the girl with whom Chuck E. was in love.

== Chart history ==
=== Weekly charts ===
Chart (1979)	Peak position
Australia (Kent Music Report)	15
Canada RPM Top Singles	5
Canada RPM Adult Contemporary	31
Ireland (IRMA)	19
New Zealand (Listener)	5
UK Singles Chart	18
U.S. Billboard Hot 100	4
U.S. Billboard Adult Contemporary	20
U.S. Cash Box Top 100	4

=== Year-end charts ===
Chart (1979)	Rank
Australia	132
Canada	64
U.S. Billboard Hot 100	63
U.S. Cash Box	24
