= The Evening of My Best Day =

Studio album by Rickie Lee Jones
- Released: October 7, 2003
- Recorded: The Village Recorder, Los Angeles
- Genre: Singer-songwriter, folk pop
- Length: 55:18
- Label: V2
- Producer: Rickie Lee Jones, David Kalish; Steve Berlin (tracks 3, 4, 7), Jason Wormer (6)

Rickie Lee Jones chronology
Live at Red Rocks (2001)	The Evening of My Best Day (2003)	Rickie Lee Jones: Duchess of Coolsville (2005)

Professional ratings
Review scores
Source	Rating
AllMusic	4/5 stars
Entertainment Weekly	A−
Mojo	4/5 stars
PopMatters	7/10 stars
Q	4/5 stars
Uncut	4.5/5 stars

The Evening of My Best Day is an album by American singer-songwriter Rickie Lee Jones, released in 2003.

== Track listing ==
All tracks composed and arranged by Rickie Lee Jones; except "Sailor Song" co-written by David Kalish

1. "Ugly Man" – 4:20
2. "Second Chance" – 4:53
3. "Bitchenostrophy" – 4:38
4. "Little Mysteries" – 5:01
5. "Lap Dog" – 3:58
6. "Tell Somebody (Repeal the Patriot Act)" – 4:04
7. "Sailor Song" – 5:00
8. "A Tree on Allenford" – 5:13
9. "It Takes You There" – 5:17
10. "Mink Coat at the Bus Stop" – 4:50
11. "The Evening of My Best Day" – 4:15
12. "A Face in the Crowd" – 3:43

== Personnel ==
- Rickie Lee Jones – vocals, guitars, piano, keyboards, and sitar (on track 4), percussion (4–6, 8), bowed dulcimer (5)
- Neil Larsen – piano (1, 6), organ (2, 6), electric piano (3), keyboards (4)
- Bill Frisell – electric guitar (1, 3)
- Tony Scherr – double bass (1, 3)
- Kenny Wollesen – drums, percussion (1, 3)
- David Kalish – guitars (2, 4, 6, 10), dobro (5, 6, 8, 9)
- Mike Elizondo – bass (2, 5, 12)
- James Gadson – drums (2, 5, 6, 10)
- Alex Acuña – percussion (2, 9)
- Sal Bernardi – harmonica (4, 8), electric guitar (11)
- DJ Bonebrake – vibraphone (4)
- René Camacho – bass (4, 7, 8, 10)
- Cougar Estrada – drums (4, 7)
- David Hidalgo – acoustic guitar (7)
- John Doan – harp guitar (7)
- Craig Eastman – mandolin and violin (7)
- Nels Cline – electric guitar and slide guitar (9)
- Martin Tillman – cello (9, 11)
- Mike Watt – bass (9)
- Pete Thomas – drums (9)
- Greg Phillinganes – piano (10), organ (10, 11)
- Christopher Joyner – Wurlitzer electric piano (10)
- Rob Wasserman – bass (10)
- Philip Cordaro – acoustic guitar (11)
- Mario Calire – drums (12)

Additional vocals

- Eric Benét (1, 2), Grant Lee Phillips (3, 8, 9), Ben Harper & the Innocent Criminals (4), Syd Straw (5, 9), James Gadson (4), Greg Phillinganes (4, 6), Sal Bernardi and Cindy Wasserman (8)

Horns

- Dan Higgins – tenor saxophone (1, 2, 4), flute (2, 3)
- Jeff Dellisanti – saxophone (2, 4, 9), bass clarinet (8)
- Gary Grant – trumpet (1, 2, 4)
- Jerry Hey – trumpet and flugelhorn (1)
- Bill Reichenbach Jr. – trombone (1)
- Phil Feather – English horn (8)

Horn arrangements by Rickie Lee Jones, transcribed by Jerry Hey and Dan Higgins; orchestration for "A Tree on Allenford" by Blair Aaronson

Technical

- Jason Wormer, Mark Johnson – engineer
- Joe Chiccarelli, Mark Howard, Mark Johnson – mixing

== Chart positions ==
Year	Chart	Position
2003	Billboard 200	189
