= The Devil You Know (Rickie Lee Jones album) =

Studio album by Rickie Lee Jones
- Released: 18 September 2012
- Genre: Folk rock
- Length: 42:19
- Label: Concord Records
- Producer: Ben Harper

Rickie Lee Jones chronology
Live in Stockholm (2010)	The Devil You Know (2012)	The Other Side of Desire (2015)

Professional ratings
Review scores
Source	Rating
AllMusic	4/5 stars

The Devil You Know is an album by American singer-songwriter Rickie Lee Jones, released in September 2012 on Concord Records. It is a collection of cover songs and it was produced by Ben Harper.

== Track listing ==
1. "Sympathy for the Devil" (Mick Jagger, Keith Richards) – 6:28
2. "Only Love Can Break Your Heart" (Neil Young) – 3:54
3. "Masterpiece" (Ben Harper) – 4:28
4. "The Weight" (Robbie Robertson) – 6:32
5. "St. James Infirmary" (Traditional) – 2:19
6. "Comfort You" (Van Morrison) – 3:13
7. "Reason to Believe" (Tim Hardin) – 5:18
8. "Play with Fire" (Jagger, Brian Jones, Richards, Charlie Watts, Bill Wyman) – 3:44
9. "Seems Like a Long Time" (Theodore Anderson) – 3:54
10. "Catch the Wind" (Donovan Leitch) – 2:36

== Personnel ==
- Rickie Lee Jones – vocals, guitar, piano, percussions
- Ben Harper – guitar, bass, organ, drums, percussions, vibraphone, background vocals
- Sheldon Gomberg – bass
- Chris Joyner – organ
- Jason Yates – organ
- Larry Goldings – organ, piano
- Jamie Elman – piano
- Jesse Ingalls – piano
- D. J. Bonebrake – vibraphone
- David Lindley – violin
