= Balm in Gilead (album) =

Studio album by Rickie Lee Jones
- Released: November 3, 2009
- Genre: Folk rock
- Length: 42:51
- Label: Fantasy
- Producer: Rickie Lee Jones; David Kalish; Sheldon Gomberg

Rickie Lee Jones chronology
The Sermon on Exposition Boulevard (2007)	Balm in Gilead (2009)	Live in Stockholm (2010)

Professional ratings
Review scores
Source	Rating
Allmusic	4/5 stars

Balm in Gilead is the eleventh studio album by American singer-songwriter Rickie Lee Jones, released on November 3, 2009 by Fantasy Records. It was produced by Rickie Lee Jones together with David Kalish and Sheldon Gomberg.

== Track listing ==
All tracks are written by Rickie Lee Jones except where noted.

No.	Title	Writer(s)	Length
1.	"Wild Girl"		4:46
2.	"Old Enough"	Rickie Lee Jones; David Kalish	4:21
3.	"Remember Me"		2:44
4.	"The Moon Is Made of Gold"	Richard Loris Jones	3:00
5.	"His Jewelled Floor"		6:32
6.	"Eucalyptus Trail"		3:58
7.	"The Blue Ghazel"		4:51
8.	"The Gospel of Carlos, Norman and Smith"	Jones; Kalish	4:19
9.	"Bonfires"		4:15
10.	"Bayless St."	Jones; Kalish	4:05

== Personnel ==
- Rickie Lee Jones – vocals, guitars, bowed bass, banjo, keyboards, piano, electric piano, percussions, finger snaps; horn arrangements on "Wild Girl" and "Old Enough"
- Sebastian Steinberg – bass
- Tom Evans – saxophone, flute
- Brian Swartz – trumpet
- Arnold McCuller – background vocals
- Jon Brion – baritone guitar, guitar, bass
- David Kalish – bass, guitar, dobro, piano, organ
- Pete Thomas – drums
- Ben Harper – slide guitar
- Joel Guzman – organ, accordion
- Reggie McBride – bass
- Charlie Paxson – drums
- Patrick Maguire – octave guitar
- Alison Krauss – violin
- Vic Chesnutt – vocals
- John Reynolds – guitar, whistle
- Victoria Williams – vocals
- Tony Scherr – bass
- Kenny Wollesen – drums
- Chris Joyner – electric piano, vocals
- Bill Frisell – guitar
- Paulie Cerra – saxophone
- Grey DeLisle – autoharp
- Danny Frankel – percussions, tambourine
- Ed Maxwell – bass
- John Doan – harp guitar
- Craig Eastman – violin, mandolin
- Blair Aaronson – string and horn arrangement on "Eucalyptus Trail"

Technical

- Barrie Maguire, Chris Testa, David Kalish, Mark Johnson, Sheldon Gomberg – engineer
- Larissa Collins – art direction
