= Traffic from Paradise =

Studio album by Rickie Lee Jones
- Released: 14 September 1993
- Recorded: 1993
- Studios: Conway Recording Studios (Los Angeles); Ocean Way Studios (Los Angeles); Signet Sound Studios (Los Angeles)
- Genre: Rock
- Length: 44:45
- Label: Geffen
- Producer: Rickie Lee Jones

Rickie Lee Jones chronology
Pop Pop (1991)	Traffic from Paradise (1993)	Naked Songs (1995)

Professional ratings
Review scores
Source	Rating
AllMusic	3.5/5 stars
Chicago Tribune	3.5/4 stars
Christgau's Consumer Guide	(choice cut)
The Encyclopedia of Popular Music	3/5 stars
Entertainment Weekly	unfavorable
Los Angeles Times	3/4 stars
Orlando Sentinel	4/5 stars
Rolling Stone	4/5 stars

Traffic from Paradise is the sixth album by the musician Rickie Lee Jones, released in September 1993.

== Track listing ==
All songs written by Rickie Lee Jones, except where noted.

1. "Pink Flamingos" – 6:31
2. "Altar Boy" – 2:27
3. "Stewart's Coat" – 4:31
4. "Beat Angels" (Sal Bernardi) – 4:11
5. "Tigers" – 5:48
6. "Rebel Rebel" (David Bowie) – 4:39
7. "Jolie Jolie" – 4:26
8. "Running from Mercy" (Jones, Leo Kottke) – 6:01
9. "A Stranger's Car" – 2:53
10. "The Albatross" (Jones, Kottke, John Leftwich) – 3:12

== Personnel ==
- Rickie Lee Jones – vocals, acoustic guitar, mandolin, keyboards, bowed dulcimer, arrangements, backing vocals
- John Leftwich – musical director, bass, cello, acoustic guitar on "Tigers", backing vocals on "Stewart's Coat" and "Running from Mercy"
- Sal Bernardi – acoustic guitar, backing vocals on "Stewart's Coat" and "Running from Mercy"
- Leo Kottke – 6-string, 12-string, slide acoustic guitar, backing vocals on "Running from Mercy"
- David Hidalgo – 8-string electric guitar, backing vocals on "Beat Angels"
- Brian Setzer – electric guitar on "Rebel Rebel", backing vocals on "Beat Angels" and "Rebel Rebel"
- Dean Parks – electric guitar on "Tigers"
- David Baerwald – electric guitar on "Beat Angels", backing vocals on "The Albatross"
- Jim Keltner – drums
- Alex Acuña – drums, congas on "Tigers"
- Brad Dutz – percussion, marimba, tarkas, bodhrán, udu, mixing bowls on "Rebel Rebel"
- Efrain Toro – percussion on "Pink Flamingos" and "Stewart's Coat"
- Bobby Bruce – violin
- Douglas Lyons – French horn
- Syd Straw – backing vocals on "Beat Angels" and "Rebel Rebel"
- Lyle Lovett – backing vocals on "Running from Mercy"
- Teresa Tudury – backing vocals on "Running from Mercy"

Technical

- John Cutcliffe – executive producer
- Julie Last – engineer, mixing
- Charles Stewart Parker – artwork, cover, illustrations
- Charlotte Rose – painting on back of sleeve
