= Flying Cowboys =

Studio album by Rickie Lee Jones
- Released: September 26, 1989
- Studio: Studio 55, Los Angeles; Cherokee Studios, Los Angeles; The Village Recorder, West Los Angeles
- Length: 55:17
- Label: Geffen
- Producer: Walter Becker

Rickie Lee Jones chronology
The Magazine (1984)	Flying Cowboys (1989)	Pop Pop (1991)

Flying Cowboys is the fourth studio album by Rickie Lee Jones. It was released in September 1989 and produced by Walter Becker of Steely Dan.

== Background ==
After the release of The Magazine in 1984, Jones retreated from the limelight. She married Pascal Nabet Meyer and gave birth to daughter Charlotte Rose in 1988 while working on her fourth album.

Jones and Nabet Meyer had been writing and working together on new material for several years before the recording work commenced in 1988, with Walter Becker as producer. Jones had expressed admiration for the work of Steely Dan, particularly their album The Royal Scam (1976).

Promotional copies of Flying Cowboys were packaged with an interview with Jones conducted by Carl Arrington (previously misidentified as LeVar Burton). This interview is the source for a passage that is extensively sampled on British electronic group the Orb's 1990 hit "Little Fluffy Clouds".

== Reception ==
Professional ratings
Review scores
Source	Rating
AllMusic	4.5/5 stars
Robert Christgau	B
Rolling Stone	4/5 stars

St. Petersburg Times, Oct. 13, 1989 (4/5) – "[She] embraces adulthood and real life without sacrificing her cool, bohemian edge."

Time, Oct. 23, 1989 – "In Flying Cowboys...she sets down a kind of mystical confessional, full of allusive autobiography and reflective nonchalance. It has the breadth of an important book and the emotional impact of great rock 'n' roll."

Rolling Stone, Nov. 2, 1989 (4/5) – "While it explores a wealth of themes and musical styles, the album unfolds with the ongoing grace of one long song. What provides unity to the album's varied elements is its seductive rhythmic flow, the down-home surrealism of Jones's lyrics, the clarity and intelligence of Walter Becker's production and, of course, the sensual elasticity of Jones's extraordinary singing."

The New York Times, Dec. 24, 1989 – Best of 1989 – "Ms. Jones's newest suite of enigmatic dream songs drenched in personal mythology is an eccentric tour de force, as rich in imagery as it is self-dramatizing."

== Track listing ==
All songs written by Rickie Lee Jones, except where noted. Side two of the vinyl release of the album begins with the title track.

No.	Title	Writer(s)	Length
1.	"The Horses"	Walter Becker; Jones	4:47
2.	"Just My Baby"	Jones; Pascal Nabet-Meyer	4:44
3.	"Ghetto of My Mind"	Jones; Nabet-Meyer	6:12
4.	"Rodeo Girl"		4:50
5.	"Satellites"		4:54
6.	"Ghost Train"		4:16
7.	"Flying Cowboys"	Sal Bernardi; Jones; Nabet-Meyer	5:02
8.	"Don't Let the Sun Catch You Crying"	Les Chadwick; Leslie Maguire; Gerry Marsden; Fred Marsden	4:13
9.	"Love Is Gonna Bring Us Back Alive"	Jones; Nabet-Meyer	4:51
10.	"Away from the Sky"		5:30
11.	"Atlas' Marker"		5:58

== Personnel ==
=== Musicians ===
- Rickie Lee Jones – synthesizer, string synthesizer, organ, guitar, steel drums, drum programming, vocals; all instruments (4)
- John Robinson – drums (1, 3, 5, 9)
- Peter Erskine – drums (7, 11)
- Buzz Feiten – guitar (1, 3, 5, 9)
- Dean Parks – guitar (1–3, 5, 7, 10, 11)
- Greg Phillinganes – keyboards (1, 3, 5)
- Neil Stubenhaus – bass (1, 3, 5, 9, 11)
- Sal Bernardi – guitar (7), backing vocals (7, 8)
- Jim Keltner – drum machine effects (6)
- Bob Sheppard – saxophone (5, 8, 9)
- Rob Wasserman – bass (8)
- Paulinho da Costa – percussion (8)
- William "Smitty" Smith – organ (1)
- Michael Omartian – piano (1)
- Ed Alton – acoustic bass (2)
- Michael Fisher – percussion (2, 11)
- Gary Coleman – vibraphone (2)
- Bob Zimmitti – percussion (1, 3, 5, 9)
- Chris Dickie – drum programming (4)
- Walter Becker – synthesizer (5), bass (7)
- Marty Krystall – English horn, clarinet (7), tenor saxophone (9)
- Vince Mendoza – trumpet (7)
- Greg Mathieson – Hammond B3 organ (9)
- Michael Boddicker – string synthesizer (10)
- Pascal Nabet-Meyer – synthesizer, piano (7), percussion programming (11)
- Randy Brecker – trumpet (11)
- Vonda Shepard – backing vocals
- Chris Smith – harmonica (2, 9)
- Kevin Dorsey, Michael Ruff – backing vocals (1)
- Leslie Smith, the Waters – backing vocals (3)

=== Production ===
- Walter Becker – producer
- Gary Gersh, Pascal Nabet Meyer – executive producers
- Greg Penny - recording and mixing - engineer
- Roger Nicols, Mark Linett, Lavant Coppock, Roger Hart – engineer
- Stephen Marcussen – mastering engineer (Precision Lacquer)
- Jose Esteban Martinez – front cover painting titled "I Am Singing at Your Window"

== Charts ==
Chart (1989/90)	Peak position
Australian Albums (ARIA Charts)	70
US (Billboard 200)	39
