= World Domination Recordings =

Record label

World Domination Recordings was an indie rock record label founded by bass player and music entrepreneur Dave Allen in Los Angeles.

From roughly 1989 to 1996 it released records by artists including Low Pop Suicide, The Elastic Purejoy, Stanford Prison Experiment, Perfume Tree, Latimer, Sky Cries Mary, Loop Guru, Sugar Plant, Contagion, and Noah Stone, and published a zine with essays by Allen and design by Ophelia Chong, called Clutter.

More recently, Allen founded the label Pampelmoose.

== See also ==
- List of record labels
