= Rickie Lee Jones (album) =

Studio album by Rickie Lee Jones
- Released: February 28, 1979
- Recorded: September–December 1978
- Studios: Warner Bros. Recording Studios and The Burbank Studios; Tracks 2, 11 recorded live December 22, 1978, at TBS
- Genres: Rock; R&B; jazz
- Length: 42:11
- Label: Warner Bros.
- Producers: Lenny Waronker; Russ Titelman

Rickie Lee Jones chronology
Rickie Lee Jones (1979)	Pirates (1981)

Chuck E's In Love
Rickie Lee Jones, Chuck E's in Love (Warner Bros., 1979)

Rickie Lee Jones is the debut studio album by American singer-songwriter Rickie Lee Jones, released on February 28, 1979, by Warner Bros. Records.

== Background ==
Jones had begun playing live in the Los Angeles area at the age of 21, and after meeting singer-songwriter Alfred Johnson, the pair began writing and performing live together (most notably at the Ala Carte club.) Two of their collaborations, "Weasel and the White Boys Cool" and "Company," would later be recorded for Jones' debut album. She also sang jazz standards, as well as a song penned by her father ("The Moon Is Made of Gold") in her live sets.

Jones' performances around Los Angeles aroused interest from other local songwriters, as well as local record company executives. At a label showcase, Jones performed originals, including "Chuck E.'s in Love", "The Real Thing Is Back in Town" and "The Moon Is Made of Gold." This showcase performance, plus a demo containing "The Last Chance Texaco", "Easy Money", "Young Blood" and "After Hours" led to a record deal with Warner Bros. For her major label debut, Jones scrapped "The Real Thing Is Back in Town," but used the titular line in one of the album's tracks – "Coolsville."

Recording sessions (which began in September 1978) yielded eleven songs for inclusion on an album. Two of the songs – "On Saturday Afternoons in 1963" and "After Hours" – were recorded live on December 22, 1978.

== Cover image ==
The album cover photo was taken by Norman Seeff, and the art direction and design was by Mike Salisbury.

== Reception ==
Professional ratings
Review scores
Source	Rating
AllMusic	5/5 stars
Music Week	2/4 stars
Smash Hits	8/10
The Village Voice	B−
DownBeat	4/5 stars

A retrospective review from AllMusic stated, "With her expressive soprano voice employing sudden alterations of volume and force, and her lyrical focus on Los Angeles street life, Rickie Lee Jones comes on like the love child of Laura Nyro and Tom Waits on her astounding self-titled debut album that simultaneously sounds like a synthesis of many familiar styles and like nothing that anybody's ever done before."

The lead single "Chuck E.'s in Love" peaked at No. 4 on the U.S. Billboard Hot 100, while the album peaked at No. 3 on the Billboard 200. The album was further promoted by a performance on Saturday Night Live in April 1979, where she performed "Chuck E.'s in Love" and "Coolsville". A second single, "Young Blood", peaked at No. 40 on the Billboard Hot 100 in late 1979. The album was certified Platinum by the Recording Industry Association of America on August 7, 1979, for sales of one million copies. The album was also certified Silver in the UK and 2x Platinum in Australia.

== Awards ==
Year	Award	Work	Category	Recipient	Result	Ref.
1980	Grammy Awards	Rickie Lee Jones	Best New Artist	Rickie Lee Jones	Won	
1980	Grammy Awards	"Chuck E.'s In Love"	Song of the Year	Rickie Lee Jones	Nominated	
1980	Grammy Awards	"Chuck E.'s In Love"	Best Pop Vocal Performance, Female	Rickie Lee Jones	Nominated	
1980	Grammy Awards	"The Last Chance Texaco"	Best Rock Vocal Performance, Female	Rickie Lee Jones	Nominated	
1980	Grammy Awards	Rickie Lee Jones	Best Engineered Recording – Non-Classical	Tom Knox	Nominated	

== Track listing ==
Credits adapted from the album's liner notes. All tracks written by Rickie Lee Jones, except tracks 9 and 10, co-written by Alfred Johnson.

Side one

1. "Chuck E.'s in Love" – 3:28
2. "On Saturday Afternoons in 1963" – 2:31
3. "Night Train" – 3:14
4. "Young Blood" – 4:04
5. "Easy Money" – 3:16
6. "The Last Chance Texaco" – 4:05

Side two

1. "Danny's All-Star Joint" – 4:01
2. "Coolsville" – 3:49
3. "Weasel and the White Boys Cool" – 6:00
4. "Company" – 4:40
5. "After Hours (Twelve Bars Past Goodnight)" – 2:13

== Personnel ==
- Rickie Lee Jones – vocals, keyboards, percussion, guitar, backing vocals, horn arrangements
- Ralph Grierson, Dr. John, Randy Kerber, Neil Larsen – keyboards
- Michael McDonald – backing vocals
- Michael "Bobby" Boddicker, Randy Newman – synthesizer
- Victor Feldman – percussion, drums, keyboards
- Chuck Findley, Tom Scott, Ernie Watts – horns
- Red Callender – double bass
- Nick DeCaro – accordion; orchestral arrangements on "On Saturday Afternoons in 1963", "Night Train" and "After Hours"
- Buzz Feiten – guitar
- Steve Gadd, Andy Newmark, Jeff Porcaro – drums
- Arno Lucas – backing vocals
- Johnny Mandel – orchestral arrangements on "Coolsville" and "Company"
- Leslie Smith – backing vocals
- Mark Stevens – drums, percussion
- Fred Tackett – guitar, mandolin
- Joe Turano – backing vocals
- Willie Weeks – Fender bass
- Matthew Wilder – backing vocals

Technical

- Penny Ringwood – production assistant
- Lee Herschberg, Loyd Clifft – engineer
- Roger Nichols, Tom Knox – additional engineering
- Mike Salisbury – art direction, cover design
- Norman Seeff – cover photography

== Charts ==
=== Weekly charts ===
Chart (1979)	Peak position
Australian Albums (Kent Music Report)	1
Canada Top Albums/CDs (RPM)	11
Dutch Albums (Album Top 100)	14
New Zealand Albums (RMNZ)	3
Swedish Albums (Sverigetopplistan)	42
UK Albums (Official Charts)	18
US Billboard 200	3

=== Year-end charts ===
Chart (1979)	Peak position
Australian Albums (Kent Music Report)	9
New Zealand Albums (RMNZ)	19

== Certifications ==
Region	Certification	Certified units/sales
Australia (ARIA)	2× Platinum	140,000^{^}
United Kingdom (BPI)	Silver	60,000^{^}
United States (RIAA)	Platinum	1,000,000^{^}
^{^} Shipments figures based on certification alone.
