= Pop Pop =

Studio album by Rickie Lee Jones
- Released: September 1991
- Recorded: 1989
- Studios: Skyline, Topanga, California
- Genres: Jazz, vocal jazz, folk
- Label: Geffen
- Producers: David Was, Rickie Lee Jones

Rickie Lee Jones chronology
Flying Cowboys (1989)	Pop Pop (1991)	Traffic from Paradise (1993)

Pop Pop is an album by the American musician Rickie Lee Jones, released in September 1991.

The album contains cover versions, ranging from jazz and blues standards to Tin Pan Alley to Jimi Hendrix's "Up from the Skies". It reached No. 8 on the Billboard Contemporary Jazz Albums and No. 121 on the Billboard 200.

== Production ==
The album was coproduced by David Was and Jones. Charlie Haden played bass on some of its tracks. The cover artwork resembles a package of bang snaps.

== Critical reception ==
Professional ratings
Review scores
Source	Rating
Calgary Herald	B

The New York Times wrote that Jones's "vocal eccentricities, her swoops and shudders and pucker-sweet coos, seem at odds with the material rather than complicitous." The Calgary Herald noted that "Jones's plaintive, muttering, whispering little-girl voice weaves a web of intimacy around the listener... Still, it's not for every taste."

== Track listing ==
1. "My One and Only Love" (Guy Wood, Robert Mellin) – 5:55
2. "Spring Can Really Hang You Up the Most" (Fran Landesman, Tommy Wolf) – 3:57
3. "Hi-Lili, Hi-Lo" (Bronisław Kaper, Helen Deutsch) – 3:38
4. "Up from the Skies" (Jimi Hendrix) – 4:32
5. "The Second Time Around" (Jimmy Van Heusen, Sammy Cahn) – 4:50
6. "Dat Dere" (Bobby Timmons, Oscar Brown, Jr.) – 4:07
7. "I'll Be Seeing You" (Irving Kahal, Sammy Fain) – 3:14
8. "Bye Bye Blackbird" (Mort Dixon, Ray Henderson) – 2:22
9. "The Ballad of the Sad Young Men" (Fran Landesman, Tommy Wolf) – 4:22
10. "I Won't Grow Up" (Carolyn Leigh, Mark Charlap) – 3:11
11. "Love Junkyard" (David Weiss, John Keller) – 4:11
12. "Comin' Back to Me" (Marty Balin) – 5:35

== Personnel ==
- Rickie Lee Jones, vocals; acoustic guitar on "Comin' Back to Me"
- Robben Ford – acoustic guitar
- Charlie Haden, John Leftwich – acoustic bass
- Walfredo Reyes, Jr. – bongos, shakers
- Bob Sheppard – clarinet on "I'll Be Seeing You", tenor saxophone on "Love Junkyard"
- Joe Henderson – tenor saxophone on "Dat Dere" and "Bye Bye Blackbird"
- Dino Saluzzi – bandoneon on "My One and Only Love", "Hi-Lili Hi-Lo" and "The Ballad of the Sad Young Men"
- Charlie Shoemake – vibraphone on "Love Junkyard"
- Steven Kindler – violin on "Second Time Around"
- David Was – percussion, background vocals
- Michael O'Neill – acoustic guitar on "Up From The Skies" and "Love Junkyard"
- Michael Greiner – hurdy-gurdy on "Comin' Back to Me"
- April Gay, Arnold McCuller, David Was, Donny Gerrard, Terry Bradford – backing vocals

Technical

- Greg Penny, John Eden, Jon Ingoldsby – engineer
- Kevin Reagan – art direction, design
- Pascal Nabet Meyer – Executive Producer
