= Pirates (Rickie Lee Jones album) =

Studio album by Rickie Lee Jones
- Released: July 15, 1981
- Recorded: January 1980 – April 1981
- Studios: Warner Bros. Recording Studios, North Hollywood, California
- Genre: Rock
- Length: 38:38
- Label: Warner Bros.
- Producers: Lenny Waronker; Russ Titelman

Rickie Lee Jones chronology
Rickie Lee Jones (1979)	Pirates (1981)	Girl at Her Volcano (1983)

Pirates is the second studio album by American singer-songwriter Rickie Lee Jones, released on July 15, 1981, by Warner Bros. Records. The follow-up to her 1979 self-titled debut album, Pirates is partially an account of her break-up with fellow musician Tom Waits after the success of her debut album. The cover is a 1976-copyrighted photo by Brassaï.

The album peaked at No. 5 on the Billboard 200 and was certified Gold by the Recording Industry Association of America on September 30, 1981, for sales of 500,000 copies. The album remained on the UK album charts for three months, and was certified Silver by the British Phonographic Industry.

== Recording ==
Initial recording for Pirates began in January 1980, with the live recordings for "Skeletons" and "The Returns" from January 30 from these sessions kept on the final album. In the same month, Jones picked up a Grammy Award for Best New Artist.

Jones came to album sessions at Warner Bros. Recording Studios in North Hollywood with five songs, which were recorded and arranged in a two-month spurt in early 1980 before Jones was given an extended break for further writing. Album sessions reconvened in November 1980 and concluded in April 1981, three months before the album release.

All songs were copyrighted on June 9, 1980, as well as "Hey Bub", which was omitted from the album release, except for "Living It Up" and "Traces of the Western Slopes", copyrighted in July 1981, at the time of the album release.

== Overview ==
Jones relocated to New York City after her split from Tom Waits and soon set up home with a fellow musician, Sal Bernardi from New Jersey, whom she had met in Venice, California, in the mid-1970s, writing in their apartment in Greenwich Village. Bernardi, who had been referenced in the lyrics to "Weasel and the White Boys Cool" from her debut, was to become a frequent collaborator with Jones, and they composed the epic eight-minute suite "Traces of the Western Slopes" together.

Jones started writing the first songs from the album - "Hey Bub" (unreleased until 1983), "We Belong Together" and "Pirates" - in the autumn of 1979.

Elsewhere, the music on Pirates is often cinematic, with influences ranging from Leonard Bernstein to Bruce Springsteen and Laura Nyro. The album is more musically ambitious than its predecessor and explores elements of jazz, R&B, bebop, pop and Broadway, with multiple changes in tempo and mood within most songs.

== Critical reception ==
Professional ratings
Review scores
Source	Rating
AllMusic	4/5 stars
Christgau's Record Guide	C+
Record Mirror	4/5 stars
Rolling Stone	5/5 stars

Pirates received a perfect five-star rating in Rolling Stone, with Stephen Holden writing; "Rickie Lee Jones' Pirates arrives like a cloudburst in the desert of Eighties formula pop music and recycled heavy-metal rock. Explosively passionate and exhilaratingly eccentric, this freeform, piano-based song cycle compares with Van Morrison's Astral Weeks, Bruce Springsteen's The Wild, the Innocent & the E Street Shuffle, and Joni Mitchell's Court and Spark in the bravura way it weaves autobiography and personal myth into a flexible musical setting that conjures a lifetime's worth of character and incident." He concluded his review by stating; "[i]t's Rickie Lee Jones' voice that carries Pirates to the stars and makes her whole crazy vision not only comprehensible but compulsive, compelling and as welcome as Christmas in July."

Jones was featured for a second time on the cover of the August 6, 1981, issue of Rolling Stone. The Age wrote in their review: "On Pirates, Rickie Lee Jones executes a brilliant artistic leap which not only outshines her Grammy-winning debut album but establishes her as one of the most important singer/songwriters of the decade." The New York Times wrote that Pirates "is such a remarkable piece of work that Miss Jones's first album now sounds like a somewhat tentative rehearsal for it... Traces of the flippant, neo-beat persona she adopted on Rickie Lee Jones are still in evidence, but on the whole Pirates is a more personal album."

== Track listing ==
Credits adapted from the album's liner notes. All tracks written by Rickie Lee Jones, with additional writers noted.

No.	Title	Writer(s)	Length
1.	"We Belong Together"		4:59
2.	"Living It Up"		6:23
3.	"Skeletons"		3:37
4.	"Woody and Dutch on the Slow Train to Peking"	David Kalish	5:15
5.	"Pirates (So Long Lonely Avenue)"		3:50
6.	"A Lucky Guy"		4:14
7.	"Traces of the Western Slopes"	Sal Bernardi	8:00
8.	"The Returns"		2:20
Total length:			38:38

== Personnel ==
- Rickie Lee Jones – vocals, guitar, keyboards, synthesizer, percussion, vocals & horn arrangements
- Michael Boddicker, Donald Fagen, Rob Mounsey – synthesizer
- Victor Feldman – drums, percussion, keyboards
- David Sanborn – alto saxophone
- Tom Scott – baritone and tenor saxophone
- Ralph Burns – orchestral arrangements
- Chuck Rainey – bass guitar
- Sal Bernardi – harmonica, vocals
- Randy Brecker – trumpet, flugelhorn
- Lenny Castro – percussion
- Nick DeCaro – orchestral arrangements
- Buzz Feiten, David Kalish, Steve Lukather, Dean Parks – guitar
- Russell Ferrante, Randy Kerber, Neil Larsen, Clarence McDonald – keyboards
- Steve Gadd, Art Rodriguez – drums
- Jerry Hey – trumpet, flugelhorn, horn
- Arno Lucas – backing vocals
- Leslie Smith – backing vocals
- Joe Turano – backing vocals

Technical

- Lee Hershberg, Loyd Clifft, Mark Linett – recording engineer
- Lee Hershberg, Mark Linett – mix engineer
- Mike Salisbury – cover design
- Brassaï – front cover photography

== Charts ==
=== Weekly charts ===
Chart (1981)	Peak position
Australian Albums (Kent Music Report)	9
Canada Top Albums/CDs (RPM)	7
Dutch Albums (Album Top 100)	43
New Zealand Albums (RMNZ)	4
Norwegian Albums (VG-lista)	16
UK Albums (Official Charts)	37
US Billboard 200	5

=== Year-end charts ===
Chart (1981)	Position
New Zealand Albums (RMNZ)	29

== Certifications ==
Region	Certification	Certified units/sales
United Kingdom (BPI)	Silver	60,000^{^}
United States (RIAA)	Gold	500,000^{^}
^{^} Shipments figures based on certification alone.
