= Rickie Lee Jones =

American singer (born 1954)

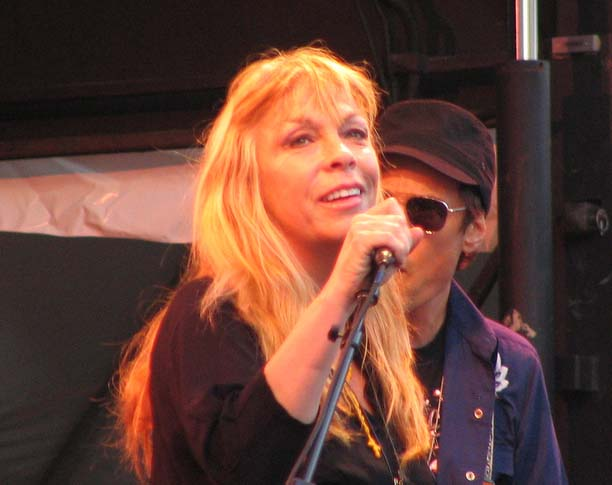
- Jones performing in 2007

Background information
- Born: November 8, 1954 (age 71); Chicago, Illinois, United States
- Genres: Rock, R&B, pop
- Occupations: Singer-songwriter, musician
- Instruments: Vocals, guitar, piano
- Years active: 1979–present
- Labels: Warner Bros., Geffen, Reprise, Artemis, V2, New West, Fantasy, OSOD/Thirty Tigers, Buffalo Records
- Website: rickieleejones.com

Rickie Lee Jones (born November 8, 1954) is an American singer, musician, and songwriter. Over the course of a career that spans five decades and 15 studio albums, she has recorded in various musical styles including rock, R&B, pop, soul, and jazz. A two-time Grammy Award winner (from eight nominations), Jones was listed at No. 30 on VH1's 100 Greatest Women in Rock & Roll in 1999. AllMusic stated: "Few singer/songwriters are as individual and eclectic as Rickie Lee Jones, a vocalist with an expressive and smoky instrument, and a composer who can weave jazz, folk, and R&B into songs with a distinct pop sensibility."

She released her self-titled debut album in 1979, to critical and commercial success. It peaked at No. 3 on the U.S. Billboard 200, and spawned the hit single "Chuck E.'s in Love", which peaked at No. 4 on the Billboard Hot 100. The album went platinum later that year, and earned Jones four Grammy Award nominations in 1980, including Best New Artist, which she won. Her second album, Pirates, followed in 1981 to further critical and commercial success; it peaked at No. 5 on the Billboard 200, went gold, and ranked No. 49 on NPR's list of the 150 Greatest Albums Made by Women in 2017.

Her third album, The Magazine, appeared in 1984 before Jones took a brief hiatus from recording. Her fourth album, Flying Cowboys, was released in 1989 and later went gold. Jones won her second Grammy Award in 1990 for "Makin' Whoopee", a duet with Dr. John, this time in the category of Best Jazz Vocal Performance, Duo or Group. Jones' seventh Grammy Award nomination followed in 2001 in the category of Best Traditional Pop Vocal Album for her album It's Like This (2000). Jones released her memoir, Last Chance Texaco: Chronicles of an American Troubadour, in 2021. Her 15th studio album, Pieces of Treasure, was released in 2023 and earned Jones her eighth Grammy Award nomination, for Best Traditional Pop Vocal Album.

== Early life ==
Jones was born the third of four children to Richard and Bettye Jones, on the north side of Chicago, Illinois, on November 8, 1954. She was named after her father, who was a singer, songwriter, painter, and trumpet player. Her mother, Bettye, was raised in orphanages around Mansfield, Ohio. She has a brother, Daniel, and two sisters, Janet Adele and Pamela Jo. Her paternal grandfather, Frank "Peg Leg" Jones, and her grandmother, Myrtle Lee, were vaudevillians based in Chicago. A singer, dancer, and comedian, Peg Leg Jones's routine consisted of singing and accompanying himself on ukulele, soft shoe dance, acrobatics, and comedy.

Jones lived in Phoenix, Arizona, from age 4 to 14.

== Career ==
=== Early years: 1975–1982 ===
At the age of 21, Jones began singing traditional jazz and original compositions in bars and coffee houses in Venice, California. There she met Alfred Johnson, a piano player and songwriter, with whom she wrote "Weasel and the White Boys Cool", and "Company", which would later appear on Jones's debut album. In 1977, Jones met Tom Waits at The Troubadour. They dated for about two years, before splitting in 1979.

"Chuck E.'s in Love"
20-second sample

Rickie Lee Jones was released in March 1979 and became a critical and commercial hit, buoyed by the success of the jazz-flavored single "Chuck E.'s in Love", which hit No. 4 on the Billboard Hot 100, and featured an accompanying music video. The song was occasioned by her friend, Chuck E. Weiss, telephoning her and Tom Waits, all three of them close friends at the time, in the fall of 1977 to tell them that he had fallen in love. The album, which included guest appearances by Dr. John, Randy Newman, and Michael McDonald, reached No. 3 on the Billboard 200, went Platinum, and produced another Top 40 hit with "Young Blood" (No. 40) in late 1979.

Her appearance – as an unknown (one month after her debut record had been released) – on Saturday Night Live on April 7, 1979, sparked an overnight sensation. She performed "Chuck E.'s in Love" and "Coolsville". Jones was covered by Time magazine on her very first professional show, in Boston, and they dubbed her "The Duchess of Coolsville". Touring after the album's release, she played Carnegie Hall on July 22, 1979. Members of her group included native New York guitarist Buzz Feiten, who was featured on the album and would appear in her recorded works for over a decade. Following her first-ever performances in the spring/summer of 1979, Jones appeared on the cover of Rolling Stone magazine. Photographed by Annie Leibovitz, the cover image showed Jones posing in a crouched stance, wearing a black bra and a white beret.

Jones secured four nominations at the 22nd Annual Grammy Awards: Song of the Year and Best Pop Vocal Performance, Female for "Chuck E.'s in Love"; Best Rock Vocal Performance, Female for "The Last Chance Texaco"; and Best New Artist, which she won. The album also earned a nomination for Best Engineered Recording - Non-Classical, credited to Tom Knox.

In 1980, Francis Ford Coppola asked Jones to collaborate with Waits on his upcoming film One from the Heart, but she balked, citing their recent breakup in late 1979. Coppola argued that the duet would be perfect for the film, since the two main characters in the film are separated, and he asked her to reconsider. Waits ultimately sang with country pop star Crystal Gayle.

In 1981, Jones released her second album, Pirates, which received high marks from critics and was a commercial success. The album reached No. 5 on the Billboard 200, and soon achieved Gold certification. Rolling Stone remained a fervent supporter of Jones, with a second cover feature in 1981; the magazine also included a glowing five-star review of Pirates. The single "A Lucky Guy" became the only Billboard Hot 100 hit from the album, peaking at No. 64, but "Pirates (So Long Lonely Avenue)" and "Woody and Dutch on the Slow Train to Peking" became minor Top 40 hits on the Billboard Mainstream Rock chart.

Jones left New York for San Francisco where she befriended Robin Williams. In Los Angeles, she recorded the EP Girl at Her Volcano, producing the record herself and drawing the cover art. It was released as a 10" record in 1983, featuring a mix of live and studio cover versions of jazz and pop standards, as well as one Jones original, "Hey, Bub", which was originally written for Pirates. Jones then relocated to Paris.

=== Period of transition: 1983–1989 ===
In 1983, Jones lived in Paris for four months, writing new material for her third full-length solo album, The Magazine, released in September 1984. The Magazine was produced by Jones and James Newton Howard and included a three-song suite, subtitled "Rorschachs", which featured multi-tracked vocals and minimalist synth patterns. The lead single, "The Real End", reached No. 82 on the Billboard Hot 100 in 1984.

Jones took a four-year break from her recording schedule, largely attributed to the deaths of her mentor Bob Regher as well as her father, Richard Loris Jones, that same year. During this period, she replaced Shirley Jones for the role of the Fairy Godmother in Filmation's 1987 film, Pinocchio and the Emperor of the Night, including a performance of the original song "Love is the Light Inside Your Heart".

After a successful tour of Norway and Sweden, and then opening for Ray Charles in Israel with Michael Lang managing her, she returned to the US, signed to Geffen Records by Gary Gersh, who teamed her with Steely Dan's Walter Becker for her long-awaited fourth album. In September 1988, the two of them began work on Flying Cowboys. The album was released in September 1989, and produced two hits: "Satellites", which hit No. 1 on the new Adult radio format; and "The Horses", co-written with Becker. The latter song was covered by Kenny Loggins, and also featured in the movie Jerry Maguire (1996). "The Horses" also became an Australian No. 1 hit single for Daryl Braithwaite when he covered it in 1991. Flying Cowboys made the US Top 40, reaching No. 39 on the Billboard 200, with the college radio hit "Satellites" making it to No. 23 on the Billboard Modern Rock Tracks chart. The album was certified Gold in 1997.

Her 1988 collaboration with Rob Wasserman, "Autumn Leaves" on his album Duets, earned Jones a Grammy Award nomination for Best Jazz Vocal Performance, Female in 1989. Her duet with Dr. John, a cover of "Makin' Whoopee", won her second Grammy Award in 1990, this time in the category of Best Jazz Vocal Collaboration.

=== Experimentation and change: 1990–2001 ===
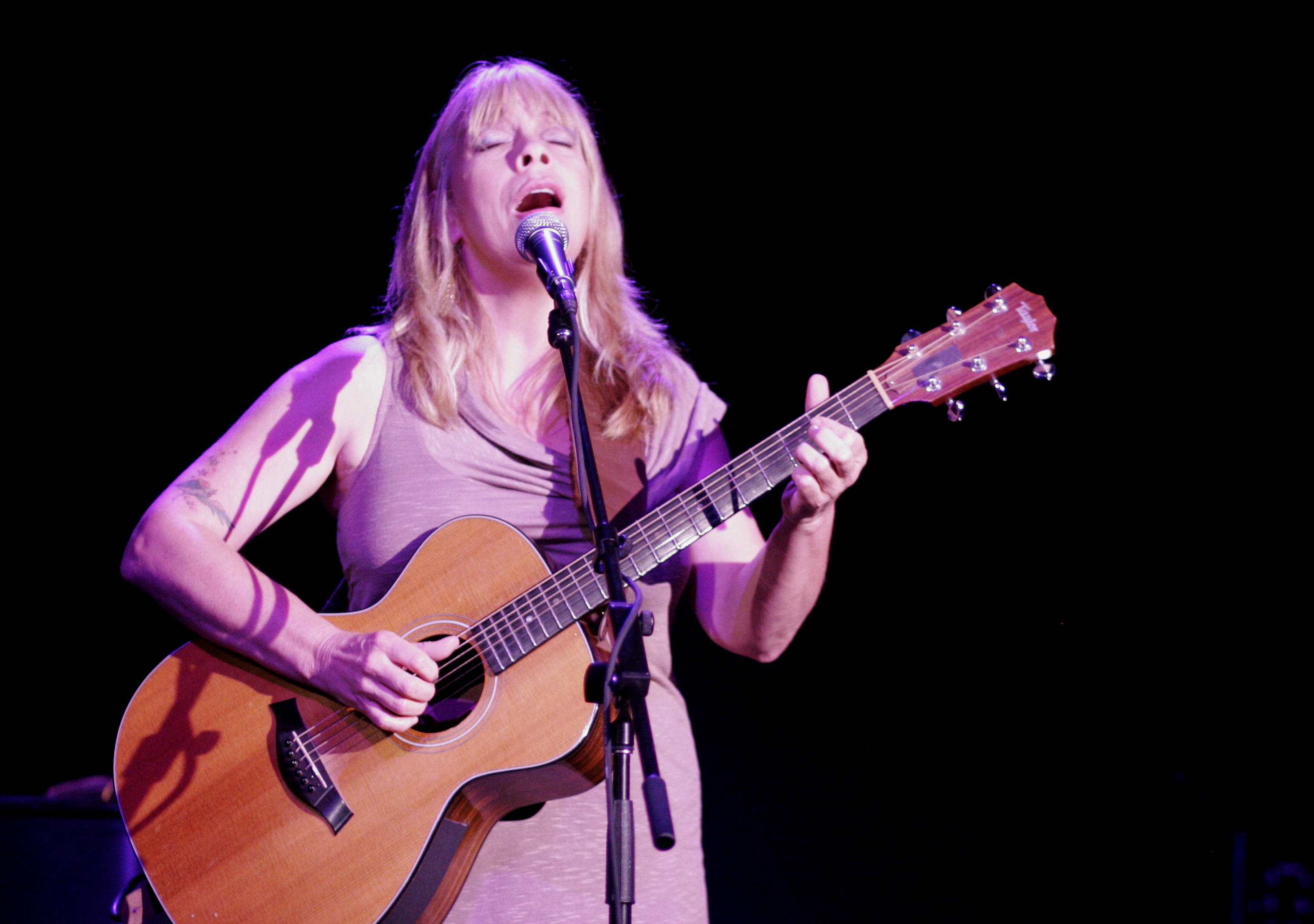
Jones in concert

Following a tour with Lyle Lovett, Jones enlisted David Was to produce her first album of jazz covers. Her producer chose an innovative approach and she agreed, thus the Argentinian flavored Pop Pop, set the pace for what would become a habit with Jones - mixing styles of jazz and pop and not staying in one genre for a whole recording: Tin Pan Alley to Jimi Hendrix. The album, released in September 1991, was a hit on the Billboard Contemporary Jazz Albums, peaking at No. 8, but became her least commercially successful record yet, reaching No. 121 on the Billboard 200.

Soon after, The Orb issued "Little Fluffy Clouds", featuring a sampled Jones interview. However, Jones' record company objected to the unauthorized use of her voice and pursued the issue in the court system. In 1992 she toured extensively with Rob Wasserman, with whom she had collaborated in the mid-1980s.

Her swan song for Geffen Records was Traffic from Paradise, released in September 1993. The album was slightly more successful than its predecessor, reaching No. 111 on the Billboard 200, and was notable for its collaboration with Leo Kottke, its musical diversity, and a cover of David Bowie's "Rebel Rebel", which was originally planned to be the title track for the Oscar-winning film Boys Don't Cry. Before his death, Bowie was quoted as saying that this version was his favorite cover of his work.

Throughout this period, her songs were featured in a number of films and television series, including House M.D., Thirtysomething, Frankie and Johnny, When a Man Loves a Woman, Jerry Maguire, Friends with Money and the French film Subway. Jones sang a duet with Lyle Lovett on "North Dakota" for his 1992 album Joshua Judges Ruth and has also sung on albums by John Mellencamp, Leo Kottke and Arlo Guthrie.

Jones' first solo shows in 1994 paved the way for her acoustic album Naked Songs, released in September 1995 through a one-off deal with Reprise Records. The album, which reached No. 121 on the Billboard 200, featured acoustic re-workings of Jones classics and album material, but no new songs. The same year, Jones produced Leo Kottke's Peculiaroso album.

Emphasizing her experimentation and change, Jones embraced electronic music for Ghostyhead, released on Reprise Records in June 1997. The album, a collaboration with Rick Boston (both are credited with production and with twenty-one instruments in common), found Jones employing beats, loops, and electronic rhythms, and also showcased Jones' connection with the trip hop movement of the mid-to-late 1990s. Despite critical acclaim, it did not meet with commercial success, peaking at No. 159 on the Billboard 200.

Jones' second album of cover versions, It's Like This, was released on the independent record label Artemis Records in September 2000. The album included cover versions of material by artists including The Beatles, Steely Dan, Marvin Gaye, and the Gershwin brothers. It made it onto three Billboard charts – No.148 on the Billboard 200, No. 10 on Top Internet Albums, and No. 42 on Top Independent Albums. The album also secured Jones another Grammy Award nomination for Best Traditional Pop Vocal Album. Her cover art design (shared with a staff artist but never credited to Jones) won numerous awards and is in the book Best Album Covers.

In November 2001, Artemis issued a release of archival material titled Live at Red Rocks with cover art by a young fan who had recently died in a swimming accident. Her parents brought her drawing of flying horses to one of Jones' shows in Oregon, and Jones used it for this live release.

=== Artistic renaissance: 2002–present ===
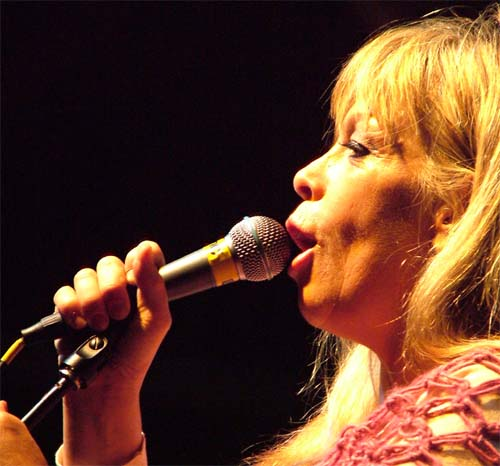
Jones performing on the Legacy Stage on June 15, 2007

After Ghostyhead, Jones largely retired from public view, tending her garden and bringing up her teenage daughter Charlotte.

Released on the independent label V2 in October 2003, The Evening of My Best Day featured influences from jazz, Celtic folk, blues, R&B, rock, and gospel, and spawned a successful and lengthy spurt of touring. The album peaked at No. 189 on the Billboard 200. She invited punk bass icon Mike Watt (the Minutemen, Iggy Pop) to perform on "It Takes You There", while "Ugly Man" was a direct aim at the George Bush 'regime' evoking, with an anthem-like Hugh Masekela arrangement, what she termed "the Black Panther horns", and calling for "revolution, everywhere that you're not looking, revolution."

Renewed interest in Jones led to the three-disc anthology Duchess of Coolsville: An Anthology, released through reissue specialists Rhino in June 2005. A lavish package designed by Lee Cantelon, the alphabetically arranged release featured album songs, live material, covers, and demos, and featured essays by Jones as well as various collaborators, as well as tributes from artists including Randy Newman, Walter Becker, Quincy Jones, and Tori Amos.

Also in 2005, Jones was invited to take part in her boyfriend and collaborator Lee Cantelon's music version of his book The Words, a book of the words of Christ, set into simple chapters and themes. Cantelon's idea was to have various artists recite the text over primal rock music, but Jones elected to try something that had never been done, to improvise her own impression of the texts, melody and lyric, in stream of consciousness sessions, rather than read Jesus' words. The sessions were recorded at an artist's loft on Exposition Boulevard in Culver City. When Cantelon could no longer finish the project, Jones picked it up as her own record and hired Rob Schnaf to finish the production at Sunset Sound in 2007, and the result was The Sermon on Exposition Boulevard, released on the independent New West Records in February 2007. It included "Circle in the Sand", recorded for the soundtrack to the film Friends with Money (2006), for which Jones also cut "Hillbilly Song". The Sermon on Exposition Boulevard debuted at No. 158 on the Billboard 200 and No. 12 on the Top Independent Albums tally. Writer Ann Powers included this on her list of Grammy-worthy CDs for 2007.

For her next project, Balm in Gilead (2009), Jones opted to finish half-written songs dating back as far as 1986 ("Wild Girl") as well as include new ones (the 2008-penned "The Gospel of Carlos, Norman and Smith", "Bonfires"). The album also included a new recording of "The Moon Is Made of Gold", a song written by her father Richard Loris Jones in 1954. Ben Harper, Victoria Williams, Jon Brion, Alison Krauss and the late Vic Chesnutt all made contributions to the album.

In May 2010, Jones performed at the Sydney Opera House as part of the Vivid Live festival. Jones also served as the narrator of Cam Archer's 2010 film Shit Year.

On September 18, 2012, Jones released The Devil You Know on Fantasy/Concord Records. The Devil You Know includes a collection of covers produced by Ben Harper, including a solo version of "Sympathy for the Devil". Shortly afterward she left Los Angeles and moved to New Orleans.

In 2015, Jones released her album The Other Side of Desire, and the single "Jimmy Choos" which references the shoe brand. A documentary film, Rickie Lee Jones: The Other Side of Desire, on the making of the album, was also released. It was her first album of all new original material since Balm in Gilead six years earlier.

In 2019, Jones released a single of the Paul Rodgers/Simon Kirke song, "Bad Company", followed by her album Kicks which included "Bad Company" and cover versions of many other songs. In June of that year, she played at the Glastonbury Festival.

In 2021, Jones's memoir Last Chance Texaco: Chronicles of an American Troubadour was released by Grove Press. Simon and Schuster bought the audio book rights.

== Activism ==
In 2001, Jones was the organizer of the web community "Furniture for the People", which was founded by Jones to promote "peace and activism", and to act as a public forum. Members of the group engage in activities such as gardening, social activism, bootleg exchange and left-wing politics.

== Awards ==
=== Grammy Awards ===
The Grammy Awards are awarded annually by The Recording Academy of the United States for outstanding achievements in the music industry. Often considered the highest music honor, the awards were established in 1958. Jones has won two awards, from eight nominations.

Year	Work	Award	Result	Ref.
1980	Rickie Lee Jones	Best New Artist	Won	
1980	"Chuck E.'s in Love"	Song of the Year	Nominated	
1980	"Chuck E.'s in Love"	Best Pop Vocal Performance, Female	Nominated	
1980	"The Last Chance Texaco"	Best Rock Vocal Performance, Female	Nominated	
1989	"Autumn Leaves"	Best Jazz Vocal Performance, Female	Nominated	
1990	"Makin' Whoopee" (with Dr. John)	Best Jazz Vocal Performance, Duo or Group	Won	
2001	It's Like This	Best Traditional Pop Vocal Album	Nominated	
2024	Pieces of Treasure	Best Traditional Pop Vocal Album	Nominated	

- Rickie Lee Jones also received a Grammy Award nomination for Best Engineered Recording - Non-Classical in 1980. The nomination is credited to Tom Knox.

=== Other honors and recognitions ===
- 1999 – Ranked No. 30 on VH1's 100 Greatest Women in Rock & Roll.
- 2017 – Pirates ranked No. 49 on NPR's list of the 150 Greatest Albums Made by Women.
- 2026 - Reigned as Queen Mermaid of the 2026 Coney Island Mermaid Parade

== Discography ==
=== Studio albums ===
- 1979: Rickie Lee Jones
- 1981: Pirates
- 1984: The Magazine
- 1989: Flying Cowboys
- 1991: Pop Pop
- 1993: Traffic from Paradise
- 1997: Ghostyhead
- 2000: It's Like This
- 2003: The Evening of My Best Day
- 2007: The Sermon on Exposition Boulevard
- 2009: Balm in Gilead
- 2012: The Devil You Know
- 2015: The Other Side of Desire
- 2019: Kicks
- 2023: Pieces of Treasure

=== Extended plays ===
- 1983: Girl at Her Volcano

=== Live albums ===
- 1995: Naked Songs: Live and Acoustic
- 2001: Live at Red Rocks

=== Compilation albums ===
- 2005: Duchess of Coolsville: An Anthology
- 2010: Original Album Series
