= List of minor planets: 681001–682000 =

The following is a partial list of minor planets, running from minor-planet number 681001 through 682000, inclusive. The primary data for this and other partial lists is based on JPL's "Small-Body Orbital Elements" and data available from the Minor Planet Center. Critical list information is also provided by the MPC, unless otherwise specified from Lowell Observatory. A detailed description of the table's columns and additional sources are given on the main page including a complete list of every page in this series, and a statistical break-up on the dynamical classification of minor planets.

Also see the summary list of all named bodies in numerical and alphabetical order, and the corresponding naming citations for the number range of this particular list. New namings may only be added to this list after official publication, as the preannouncement of names is condemned by the Working Group for Small Bodies Nomenclature of the International Astronomical Union.

Near-Earth obj.	MBA (inner)	MBA (outer)	Centaur
Mars-crosser	MBA (middle)	Jupiter trojan	Trans-Neptunian obj.
Unclassified

== 681001–681100 ==
Designation			Discovery			Properties		Ref
Permanent	Provisional	Named after	Date	Site	Discoverer(s)	Category	Diam.	Ref
681001	2003 YT_{184}	—	January 20, 2013	Kitt Peak	Spacewatch	·	1.5 km	MPC · JPL
681002	2003 YV_{184}	—	January 16, 2009	Kitt Peak	Spacewatch	KOR	1.2 km	MPC · JPL
681003	2003 YY_{186}	—	December 29, 2003	Kitt Peak	Spacewatch	(43176)	3.0 km	MPC · JPL
681004	2003 YE_{187}	—	August 16, 2013	Haleakala	Pan-STARRS 1	·	3.2 km	MPC · JPL
681005	2003 YW_{190}	—	April 16, 2013	Haleakala	Pan-STARRS 1	MAS	580 m	MPC · JPL
681006	2004 AN_{17}	—	January 15, 2004	Kitt Peak	Spacewatch	·	590 m	MPC · JPL
681007	2004 AM_{18}	—	January 15, 2004	Kitt Peak	Spacewatch	·	460 m	MPC · JPL
681008	2004 BP	—	December 19, 2003	Kitt Peak	Spacewatch	·	730 m	MPC · JPL
681009	2004 BP_{7}	—	January 16, 2004	Kitt Peak	Spacewatch	·	420 m	MPC · JPL
681010	2004 BF_{8}	—	January 17, 2004	Kitt Peak	Spacewatch	·	1.3 km	MPC · JPL
681011	2004 BC_{26}	—	January 12, 2004	Palomar	NEAT	·	1.5 km	MPC · JPL
681012	2004 BR_{35}	—	January 19, 2004	Kitt Peak	Spacewatch	·	1.4 km	MPC · JPL
681013	2004 BB_{82}	—	January 15, 2004	Kitt Peak	Spacewatch	·	3.2 km	MPC · JPL
681014	2004 BM_{124}	—	January 16, 2004	Kitt Peak	Spacewatch	·	560 m	MPC · JPL
681015	2004 BA_{127}	—	January 16, 2004	Kitt Peak	Spacewatch	·	1.6 km	MPC · JPL
681016	2004 BL_{132}	—	January 17, 2004	Palomar	NEAT	TIR	3.0 km	MPC · JPL
681017	2004 BU_{143}	—	January 19, 2004	Kitt Peak	Spacewatch	·	1.6 km	MPC · JPL
681018	2004 BT_{156}	—	January 28, 2004	Kitt Peak	Spacewatch	VER	2.4 km	MPC · JPL
681019	2004 BR_{164}	—	January 31, 2004	Apache Point	SDSS	·	1.7 km	MPC · JPL
681020	2004 BW_{164}	—	December 7, 2007	XuYi	PMO NEO Survey Program	·	1.7 km	MPC · JPL
681021	2004 BL_{165}	—	April 12, 2011	Mount Lemmon	Mount Lemmon Survey	·	3.2 km	MPC · JPL
681022	2004 BC_{166}	—	March 18, 2010	Mount Lemmon	Mount Lemmon Survey	·	2.0 km	MPC · JPL
681023	2004 BO_{166}	—	February 20, 2009	Kitt Peak	Spacewatch	DOR	1.7 km	MPC · JPL
681024	2004 BZ_{166}	—	January 19, 2004	Kitt Peak	Spacewatch	·	490 m	MPC · JPL
681025	2004 BV_{168}	—	November 26, 2014	Haleakala	Pan-STARRS 1	VER	2.7 km	MPC · JPL
681026	2004 BW_{168}	—	September 26, 2013	Catalina	CSS	·	3.4 km	MPC · JPL
681027	2004 BT_{169}	—	January 18, 2015	Haleakala	Pan-STARRS 1	EOS	1.7 km	MPC · JPL
681028	2004 BW_{170}	—	November 24, 2017	Haleakala	Pan-STARRS 1	·	1.4 km	MPC · JPL
681029	2004 BP_{171}	—	January 19, 2004	Kitt Peak	Spacewatch	·	1.5 km	MPC · JPL
681030	2004 BS_{171}	—	October 16, 2007	Mount Lemmon	Mount Lemmon Survey	HOF	2.0 km	MPC · JPL
681031	2004 BW_{172}	—	March 31, 2009	Mount Lemmon	Mount Lemmon Survey	·	1.4 km	MPC · JPL
681032	2004 BB_{173}	—	February 3, 2016	Haleakala	Pan-STARRS 1	·	2.6 km	MPC · JPL
681033	2004 CB_{33}	—	February 12, 2004	Kitt Peak	Spacewatch	·	810 m	MPC · JPL
681034	2004 CD_{44}	—	February 12, 2004	Kitt Peak	Spacewatch	·	840 m	MPC · JPL
681035	2004 CC_{53}	—	February 11, 2004	Kitt Peak	Spacewatch	·	1.6 km	MPC · JPL
681036	2004 CH_{117}	—	February 11, 2004	Kitt Peak	Spacewatch	THM	2.0 km	MPC · JPL
681037	2004 CX_{122}	—	February 12, 2004	Kitt Peak	Spacewatch	AGN	1.3 km	MPC · JPL
681038	2004 CQ_{131}	—	April 17, 2009	Mount Lemmon	Mount Lemmon Survey	·	2.2 km	MPC · JPL
681039	2004 CY_{131}	—	November 1, 2013	Mount Lemmon	Mount Lemmon Survey	VER	2.6 km	MPC · JPL
681040	2004 CG_{132}	—	January 12, 2010	Mount Lemmon	Mount Lemmon Survey	·	3.3 km	MPC · JPL
681041	2004 CX_{133}	—	February 3, 2009	Kitt Peak	Spacewatch	BRA	1.3 km	MPC · JPL
681042	2004 CX_{134}	—	September 3, 2010	Mount Lemmon	Mount Lemmon Survey	·	1.1 km	MPC · JPL
681043	2004 CD_{135}	—	September 26, 2016	Haleakala	Pan-STARRS 1	KOR	1.0 km	MPC · JPL
681044	2004 DH_{7}	—	November 5, 2007	Kitt Peak	Spacewatch	AGN	1.1 km	MPC · JPL
681045	2004 DY_{55}	—	February 22, 2004	Kitt Peak	Spacewatch	·	760 m	MPC · JPL
681046	2004 DO_{66}	—	February 26, 2004	Kitt Peak	Deep Ecliptic Survey	EOS	2.1 km	MPC · JPL
681047	2004 DG_{70}	—	February 26, 2004	Kitt Peak	Deep Ecliptic Survey	·	1.5 km	MPC · JPL
681048	2004 DK_{74}	—	February 17, 2004	Kitt Peak	Spacewatch	·	800 m	MPC · JPL
681049	2004 DC_{82}	—	September 4, 2016	Mount Lemmon	Mount Lemmon Survey	·	1.8 km	MPC · JPL
681050	2004 DE_{83}	—	August 4, 2013	Haleakala	Pan-STARRS 1	MAS	630 m	MPC · JPL
681051	2004 DL_{85}	—	October 25, 2008	Catalina	CSS	·	2.5 km	MPC · JPL
681052	2004 DP_{88}	—	April 20, 2009	Mount Lemmon	Mount Lemmon Survey	·	1.4 km	MPC · JPL
681053	2004 DU_{88}	—	February 26, 2004	Kitt Peak	Deep Ecliptic Survey	·	550 m	MPC · JPL
681054	2004 DY_{88}	—	June 26, 2015	Haleakala	Pan-STARRS 1	·	530 m	MPC · JPL
681055	2004 DA_{89}	—	August 19, 2006	Kitt Peak	Spacewatch	·	1.5 km	MPC · JPL
681056	2004 EW_{27}	—	March 15, 2004	Kitt Peak	Spacewatch	·	1.5 km	MPC · JPL
681057	2004 EY_{99}	—	March 15, 2004	Kitt Peak	Spacewatch	·	1.8 km	MPC · JPL
681058	2004 EU_{104}	—	March 15, 2004	Kitt Peak	Spacewatch	NEM	1.7 km	MPC · JPL
681059	2004 ER_{105}	—	March 15, 2004	Kitt Peak	Spacewatch	·	490 m	MPC · JPL
681060	2004 ET_{107}	—	March 15, 2004	Kitt Peak	Spacewatch	·	1.6 km	MPC · JPL
681061	2004 EG_{108}	—	March 15, 2004	Kitt Peak	Spacewatch	·	1.5 km	MPC · JPL
681062	2004 EW_{110}	—	March 15, 2004	Kitt Peak	Spacewatch	·	2.5 km	MPC · JPL
681063	2004 EV_{116}	—	May 28, 2014	Mount Lemmon	Mount Lemmon Survey	·	630 m	MPC · JPL
681064	2004 FJ_{4}	—	September 17, 1995	Kitt Peak	Spacewatch	·	590 m	MPC · JPL
681065	2004 FN_{9}	—	March 16, 2004	Kitt Peak	Spacewatch	WIT	860 m	MPC · JPL
681066	2004 FW_{76}	—	March 15, 2004	Kitt Peak	Spacewatch	·	660 m	MPC · JPL
681067	2004 FF_{113}	—	March 21, 2004	Kitt Peak	Spacewatch	·	1.9 km	MPC · JPL
681068	2004 FS_{137}	—	March 29, 2004	Kitt Peak	Spacewatch	·	510 m	MPC · JPL
681069	2004 FV_{137}	—	March 29, 2004	Kitt Peak	Spacewatch	KOR	1.2 km	MPC · JPL
681070	2004 FT_{152}	—	March 17, 2004	Kitt Peak	Spacewatch	KOR	1.3 km	MPC · JPL
681071	2004 FL_{155}	—	March 17, 2004	Kitt Peak	Spacewatch	NYS	910 m	MPC · JPL
681072	2004 FC_{167}	—	September 17, 2006	Kitt Peak	Spacewatch	·	1.1 km	MPC · JPL
681073	2004 FV_{168}	—	September 22, 2009	Mount Lemmon	Mount Lemmon Survey	·	810 m	MPC · JPL
681074	2004 FE_{171}	—	March 7, 2014	Mount Lemmon	Mount Lemmon Survey	·	550 m	MPC · JPL
681075	2004 FQ_{171}	—	March 10, 2016	Haleakala	Pan-STARRS 1	·	670 m	MPC · JPL
681076	2004 FB_{173}	—	October 19, 2015	Haleakala	Pan-STARRS 1	·	1.5 km	MPC · JPL
681077	2004 FO_{173}	—	December 13, 2017	Haleakala	Pan-STARRS 1	·	1.7 km	MPC · JPL
681078	2004 FW_{173}	—	April 5, 2014	Haleakala	Pan-STARRS 1	·	540 m	MPC · JPL
681079	2004 FD_{175}	—	February 28, 2014	Haleakala	Pan-STARRS 1	·	580 m	MPC · JPL
681080	2004 FV_{175}	—	October 26, 2016	Haleakala	Pan-STARRS 1	·	1.1 km	MPC · JPL
681081	2004 FM_{176}	—	February 26, 2014	Haleakala	Pan-STARRS 1	·	1.5 km	MPC · JPL
681082	2004 GO_{55}	—	April 13, 2004	Kitt Peak	Spacewatch	·	1.5 km	MPC · JPL
681083	2004 GY_{61}	—	April 13, 2004	Kitt Peak	Spacewatch	AGN	1.0 km	MPC · JPL
681084	2004 GQ_{64}	—	April 13, 2004	Kitt Peak	Spacewatch	·	1.6 km	MPC · JPL
681085	2004 GD_{82}	—	April 13, 2004	Kitt Peak	Spacewatch	V	720 m	MPC · JPL
681086	2004 GL_{86}	—	April 14, 2004	Kitt Peak	Spacewatch	·	890 m	MPC · JPL
681087	2004 GA_{89}	—	April 14, 2004	Apache Point	SDSS	MAR	1.3 km	MPC · JPL
681088	2004 GK_{89}	—	October 28, 2006	Kitt Peak	Spacewatch	KOR	1.2 km	MPC · JPL
681089	2004 GH_{90}	—	April 14, 2004	Kitt Peak	Spacewatch	·	580 m	MPC · JPL
681090	2004 HN_{22}	—	April 16, 2004	Kitt Peak	Spacewatch	MRX	960 m	MPC · JPL
681091	2004 HB_{29}	—	April 21, 2004	Kitt Peak	Spacewatch	·	1.3 km	MPC · JPL
681092	2004 HJ_{69}	—	April 22, 2004	Kitt Peak	Spacewatch	·	1.2 km	MPC · JPL
681093	2004 HA_{76}	—	April 26, 2004	Mauna Kea	P. A. Wiegert, D. D. Balam	KOR	960 m	MPC · JPL
681094	2004 HU_{76}	—	April 26, 2004	Mauna Kea	P. A. Wiegert, D. D. Balam	·	470 m	MPC · JPL
681095	2004 HM_{80}	—	October 11, 2012	Haleakala	Pan-STARRS 1	·	530 m	MPC · JPL
681096	2004 HX_{81}	—	April 29, 2014	Haleakala	Pan-STARRS 1	·	1.8 km	MPC · JPL
681097	2004 HN_{83}	—	October 8, 2012	Mount Lemmon	Mount Lemmon Survey	(2076)	830 m	MPC · JPL
681098	2004 HS_{84}	—	March 2, 2008	Mount Lemmon	Mount Lemmon Survey	·	1.2 km	MPC · JPL
681099	2004 HU_{85}	—	April 21, 2004	Kitt Peak	Spacewatch	·	1.0 km	MPC · JPL
681100	2004 JH_{37}	—	May 13, 2004	Kitt Peak	Spacewatch	·	1.1 km	MPC · JPL

== 681101–681200 ==
back to top

Designation			Discovery			Properties		Ref
Permanent	Provisional	Named after	Date	Site	Discoverer(s)	Category	Diam.	Ref
681101	2004 JJ_{40}	—	May 14, 2004	Kitt Peak	Spacewatch	EUN	760 m	MPC · JPL
681102	2004 JU_{46}	—	April 13, 2004	Kitt Peak	Spacewatch	·	2.1 km	MPC · JPL
681103	2004 JQ_{53}	—	April 19, 2004	Kitt Peak	Spacewatch	KOR	1.2 km	MPC · JPL
681104	2004 KZ_{19}	—	October 29, 2010	Mount Lemmon	Mount Lemmon Survey	·	2.1 km	MPC · JPL
681105	2004 KD_{21}	—	January 23, 2015	Haleakala	Pan-STARRS 1	·	950 m	MPC · JPL
681106	2004 KG_{22}	—	May 23, 2004	Kitt Peak	Spacewatch	·	2.0 km	MPC · JPL
681107	2004 LF_{14}	—	June 11, 2004	Kitt Peak	Spacewatch	·	940 m	MPC · JPL
681108	2004 ME_{10}	—	October 7, 2008	Mount Lemmon	Mount Lemmon Survey	·	650 m	MPC · JPL
681109	2004 NM_{34}	—	July 13, 2004	Siding Spring	SSS	·	2.4 km	MPC · JPL
681110	2004 OF_{7}	—	July 16, 2004	Socorro	LINEAR	·	1.2 km	MPC · JPL
681111	2004 OB_{18}	—	July 16, 2004	Cerro Tololo	Deep Ecliptic Survey	·	1.9 km	MPC · JPL
681112	2004 PF_{64}	—	August 10, 2004	Socorro	LINEAR	·	1.3 km	MPC · JPL
681113	2004 PK_{66}	—	August 10, 2004	Campo Imperatore	CINEOS	·	1.1 km	MPC · JPL
681114	2004 PP_{70}	—	August 8, 2004	Palomar	NEAT	(5)	1.0 km	MPC · JPL
681115	2004 PC_{83}	—	August 10, 2004	Socorro	LINEAR	·	1.0 km	MPC · JPL
681116	2004 PR_{87}	—	August 11, 2004	Socorro	LINEAR	·	1.6 km	MPC · JPL
681117	2004 PD_{110}	—	August 12, 2004	Cerro Tololo	Deep Ecliptic Survey	·	1.0 km	MPC · JPL
681118	2004 PO_{118}	—	March 19, 2007	Mount Lemmon	Mount Lemmon Survey	·	1.2 km	MPC · JPL
681119	2004 PP_{118}	—	November 25, 2009	Mount Lemmon	Mount Lemmon Survey	·	1.7 km	MPC · JPL
681120	2004 PQ_{119}	—	February 21, 2007	Mount Lemmon	Mount Lemmon Survey	(5)	990 m	MPC · JPL
681121	2004 PR_{120}	—	March 27, 2008	Kitt Peak	Spacewatch	·	1.3 km	MPC · JPL
681122	2004 PW_{120}	—	April 9, 2014	Haleakala	Pan-STARRS 1	·	1.3 km	MPC · JPL
681123	2004 PY_{120}	—	August 13, 2015	Kitt Peak	Spacewatch	EOS	1.5 km	MPC · JPL
681124	2004 PT_{121}	—	January 9, 2019	Haleakala	Pan-STARRS 1	·	810 m	MPC · JPL
681125	2004 PW_{121}	—	November 2, 2010	Mount Lemmon	Mount Lemmon Survey	·	1.6 km	MPC · JPL
681126	2004 PL_{122}	—	August 7, 2004	Palomar	NEAT	(5)	1.0 km	MPC · JPL
681127	2004 QL_{4}	—	August 9, 2004	Siding Spring	SSS	·	1.1 km	MPC · JPL
681128	2004 QF_{10}	—	August 21, 2004	Siding Spring	SSS	·	950 m	MPC · JPL
681129	2004 QT_{20}	—	August 20, 2004	Catalina	CSS	JUN	870 m	MPC · JPL
681130	2004 QZ_{29}	—	March 11, 2007	Mount Lemmon	Mount Lemmon Survey	·	1.7 km	MPC · JPL
681131	2004 QE_{30}	—	February 25, 2007	Kitt Peak	Spacewatch	·	2.0 km	MPC · JPL
681132	2004 QK_{30}	—	May 4, 2008	Kitt Peak	Spacewatch	·	2.2 km	MPC · JPL
681133	2004 QZ_{30}	—	September 16, 2010	Kitt Peak	Spacewatch	THB	2.1 km	MPC · JPL
681134	2004 QH_{31}	—	August 25, 2004	Kitt Peak	Spacewatch	V	470 m	MPC · JPL
681135	2004 QL_{31}	—	January 27, 2007	Mount Lemmon	Mount Lemmon Survey	EOS	1.7 km	MPC · JPL
681136	2004 QQ_{31}	—	February 8, 2007	Mount Lemmon	Mount Lemmon Survey	EOS	1.7 km	MPC · JPL
681137	2004 QY_{31}	—	January 25, 2012	Haleakala	Pan-STARRS 1	T_{j} (2.99) · EUP	2.2 km	MPC · JPL
681138	2004 QE_{33}	—	August 25, 2004	Kitt Peak	Spacewatch	V	560 m	MPC · JPL
681139	2004 QJ_{33}	—	October 21, 2008	Kitt Peak	Spacewatch	·	650 m	MPC · JPL
681140	2004 QV_{33}	—	October 8, 2015	Haleakala	Pan-STARRS 1	EOS	1.6 km	MPC · JPL
681141	2004 QA_{35}	—	April 20, 2017	Haleakala	Pan-STARRS 1	·	850 m	MPC · JPL
681142	2004 QR_{35}	—	July 27, 2017	Haleakala	Pan-STARRS 1	·	1.4 km	MPC · JPL
681143	2004 QY_{35}	—	November 6, 2016	Mount Lemmon	Mount Lemmon Survey	·	2.3 km	MPC · JPL
681144	2004 QF_{36}	—	February 14, 2013	Kitt Peak	Spacewatch	·	2.2 km	MPC · JPL
681145	2004 QT_{36}	—	August 9, 2015	Haleakala	Pan-STARRS 1	·	2.1 km	MPC · JPL
681146	2004 QM_{37}	—	August 25, 2004	Kitt Peak	Spacewatch	TIR	2.2 km	MPC · JPL
681147	2004 RW_{14}	—	September 6, 2004	Siding Spring	SSS	·	730 m	MPC · JPL
681148	2004 RZ_{24}	—	September 8, 2004	St. Véran	St. Veran	·	1.2 km	MPC · JPL
681149	2004 RN_{67}	—	September 8, 2004	Socorro	LINEAR	·	720 m	MPC · JPL
681150	2004 RJ_{109}	—	October 2, 2000	Kitt Peak	Spacewatch	·	880 m	MPC · JPL
681151	2004 RW_{113}	—	September 7, 2004	Palomar	NEAT	·	970 m	MPC · JPL
681152	2004 RK_{117}	—	September 7, 2004	Kitt Peak	Spacewatch	·	610 m	MPC · JPL
681153	2004 RC_{119}	—	September 7, 2004	Kitt Peak	Spacewatch	·	1.1 km	MPC · JPL
681154	2004 RF_{122}	—	September 7, 2004	Kitt Peak	Spacewatch	·	1.2 km	MPC · JPL
681155	2004 RE_{127}	—	September 7, 2004	Kitt Peak	Spacewatch	·	2.0 km	MPC · JPL
681156	2004 RH_{225}	—	September 9, 2004	Socorro	LINEAR	(5)	850 m	MPC · JPL
681157	2004 RV_{264}	—	September 10, 2004	Kitt Peak	Spacewatch	·	680 m	MPC · JPL
681158	2004 RA_{266}	—	September 10, 2004	Kitt Peak	Spacewatch	·	1.2 km	MPC · JPL
681159	2004 RL_{267}	—	September 11, 2004	Kitt Peak	Spacewatch	EOS	1.3 km	MPC · JPL
681160	2004 RN_{269}	—	September 11, 2004	Kitt Peak	Spacewatch	·	1.0 km	MPC · JPL
681161	2004 RL_{274}	—	September 11, 2004	Kitt Peak	Spacewatch	·	990 m	MPC · JPL
681162	2004 RN_{279}	—	September 15, 2004	Kitt Peak	Spacewatch	(5)	910 m	MPC · JPL
681163	2004 RC_{280}	—	September 15, 2004	Kitt Peak	Spacewatch	(5)	980 m	MPC · JPL
681164	2004 RQ_{280}	—	September 15, 2004	Kitt Peak	Spacewatch	·	1.8 km	MPC · JPL
681165	2004 RM_{283}	—	September 15, 2004	Kitt Peak	Spacewatch	·	1.8 km	MPC · JPL
681166	2004 RZ_{283}	—	September 15, 2004	Kitt Peak	Spacewatch	·	1.2 km	MPC · JPL
681167	2004 RM_{287}	—	September 13, 2004	Uccle	T. Pauwels	·	590 m	MPC · JPL
681168	2004 RD_{298}	—	September 11, 2004	Kitt Peak	Spacewatch	(5)	1.2 km	MPC · JPL
681169	2004 RK_{301}	—	September 11, 2004	Kitt Peak	Spacewatch	EUN	840 m	MPC · JPL
681170	2004 RR_{322}	—	September 13, 2004	Socorro	LINEAR	·	1.3 km	MPC · JPL
681171	2004 RN_{347}	—	September 10, 2004	Kitt Peak	Spacewatch	NEM	2.1 km	MPC · JPL
681172	2004 RN_{349}	—	September 12, 2004	Mauna Kea	P. A. Wiegert, S. Popa	·	1.3 km	MPC · JPL
681173	2004 RK_{354}	—	September 11, 2004	Kitt Peak	Spacewatch	·	880 m	MPC · JPL
681174	2004 RK_{358}	—	April 12, 2016	Haleakala	Pan-STARRS 1	·	1.3 km	MPC · JPL
681175	2004 RZ_{358}	—	March 6, 2011	Kitt Peak	Spacewatch	·	1.2 km	MPC · JPL
681176	2004 RD_{359}	—	August 27, 2009	Kitt Peak	Spacewatch	·	1.5 km	MPC · JPL
681177	2004 RZ_{361}	—	April 14, 2008	Mount Lemmon	Mount Lemmon Survey	THM	1.9 km	MPC · JPL
681178	2004 RT_{362}	—	January 3, 2016	Haleakala	Pan-STARRS 1	·	680 m	MPC · JPL
681179	2004 RG_{364}	—	April 3, 2016	Haleakala	Pan-STARRS 1	·	490 m	MPC · JPL
681180	2004 RE_{365}	—	September 12, 2004	Kitt Peak	Spacewatch	·	2.2 km	MPC · JPL
681181	2004 RQ_{365}	—	August 21, 2015	Haleakala	Pan-STARRS 1	·	1.8 km	MPC · JPL
681182	2004 SL_{5}	—	September 11, 2004	Kitt Peak	Spacewatch	·	1 km	MPC · JPL
681183	2004 SY_{24}	—	September 21, 2004	Kitt Peak	Spacewatch	·	1.1 km	MPC · JPL
681184	2004 ST_{35}	—	September 17, 2004	Kitt Peak	Spacewatch	·	1.2 km	MPC · JPL
681185	2004 SX_{35}	—	August 25, 2004	Kitt Peak	Spacewatch	·	1.9 km	MPC · JPL
681186	2004 SD_{65}	—	September 6, 2015	Kitt Peak	Spacewatch	·	2.1 km	MPC · JPL
681187	2004 TU_{22}	—	October 4, 2004	Kitt Peak	Spacewatch	·	1.0 km	MPC · JPL
681188	2004 TH_{23}	—	October 4, 2004	Kitt Peak	Spacewatch	·	1.3 km	MPC · JPL
681189	2004 TL_{24}	—	October 4, 2004	Kitt Peak	Spacewatch	EOS	1.6 km	MPC · JPL
681190	2004 TR_{28}	—	October 4, 2004	Kitt Peak	Spacewatch	·	1.0 km	MPC · JPL
681191	2004 TP_{30}	—	October 4, 2004	Kitt Peak	Spacewatch	·	820 m	MPC · JPL
681192	2004 TF_{34}	—	October 4, 2004	Kitt Peak	Spacewatch	·	1.1 km	MPC · JPL
681193	2004 TQ_{34}	—	September 22, 2004	Kitt Peak	Spacewatch	·	730 m	MPC · JPL
681194	2004 TD_{40}	—	October 4, 2004	Kitt Peak	Spacewatch	·	1.2 km	MPC · JPL
681195	2004 TS_{42}	—	November 11, 1999	Kitt Peak	Spacewatch	EOS	1.4 km	MPC · JPL
681196	2004 TS_{64}	—	September 17, 2004	Kitt Peak	Spacewatch	(5)	1.3 km	MPC · JPL
681197	2004 TQ_{73}	—	October 6, 2004	Kitt Peak	Spacewatch	·	2.3 km	MPC · JPL
681198	2004 TP_{74}	—	October 6, 2004	Kitt Peak	Spacewatch	·	1.2 km	MPC · JPL
681199	2004 TQ_{74}	—	October 6, 2004	Kitt Peak	Spacewatch	EUN	920 m	MPC · JPL
681200	2004 TT_{79}	—	October 5, 2004	Kitt Peak	Spacewatch	EOS	1.8 km	MPC · JPL

== 681201–681300 ==
back to top

Designation			Discovery			Properties		Ref
Permanent	Provisional	Named after	Date	Site	Discoverer(s)	Category	Diam.	Ref
681201	2004 TO_{95}	—	September 7, 2004	Kitt Peak	Spacewatch	·	2.2 km	MPC · JPL
681202	2004 TS_{98}	—	October 5, 2004	Kitt Peak	Spacewatch	EUN	980 m	MPC · JPL
681203	2004 TB_{118}	—	October 5, 2004	Anderson Mesa	LONEOS	·	860 m	MPC · JPL
681204	2004 TT_{138}	—	September 18, 2004	Socorro	LINEAR	·	780 m	MPC · JPL
681205	2004 TA_{147}	—	October 6, 2004	Kitt Peak	Spacewatch	·	610 m	MPC · JPL
681206	2004 TT_{148}	—	September 23, 2004	Kitt Peak	Spacewatch	·	2.3 km	MPC · JPL
681207	2004 TJ_{152}	—	October 6, 2004	Kitt Peak	Spacewatch	·	920 m	MPC · JPL
681208	2004 TY_{152}	—	October 6, 2004	Kitt Peak	Spacewatch	KOR	1.3 km	MPC · JPL
681209	2004 TS_{153}	—	October 6, 2004	Kitt Peak	Spacewatch	·	1.1 km	MPC · JPL
681210	2004 TA_{166}	—	December 14, 2001	Kitt Peak	Spacewatch	·	560 m	MPC · JPL
681211	2004 TL_{177}	—	October 6, 2004	Kitt Peak	Spacewatch	·	2.1 km	MPC · JPL
681212	2004 TE_{180}	—	October 7, 2004	Kitt Peak	Spacewatch	KOR	1.2 km	MPC · JPL
681213	2004 TZ_{186}	—	September 10, 2004	Kitt Peak	Spacewatch	·	780 m	MPC · JPL
681214	2004 TX_{189}	—	October 7, 2004	Kitt Peak	Spacewatch	·	920 m	MPC · JPL
681215	2004 TE_{190}	—	September 24, 2004	Kitt Peak	Spacewatch	·	2.4 km	MPC · JPL
681216	2004 TL_{191}	—	October 7, 2004	Kitt Peak	Spacewatch	·	2.2 km	MPC · JPL
681217	2004 TU_{193}	—	October 7, 2004	Kitt Peak	Spacewatch	(5)	1.1 km	MPC · JPL
681218	2004 TS_{195}	—	October 7, 2004	Kitt Peak	Spacewatch	·	850 m	MPC · JPL
681219	2004 TP_{214}	—	October 9, 2004	Kitt Peak	Spacewatch	·	1.2 km	MPC · JPL
681220	2004 TL_{229}	—	September 7, 2004	Kitt Peak	Spacewatch	·	550 m	MPC · JPL
681221	2004 TU_{239}	—	October 9, 2004	Kitt Peak	Spacewatch	EOS	1.5 km	MPC · JPL
681222	2004 TL_{244}	—	April 25, 2003	Kitt Peak	Spacewatch	·	960 m	MPC · JPL
681223	2004 TC_{245}	—	May 23, 2003	Kitt Peak	Spacewatch	·	2.4 km	MPC · JPL
681224	2004 TF_{254}	—	April 10, 2013	Haleakala	Pan-STARRS 1	·	1.9 km	MPC · JPL
681225	2004 TW_{259}	—	October 9, 2004	Kitt Peak	Spacewatch	·	2.2 km	MPC · JPL
681226	2004 TE_{262}	—	October 9, 2004	Kitt Peak	Spacewatch	·	2.1 km	MPC · JPL
681227	2004 TO_{288}	—	October 10, 2004	Kitt Peak	Spacewatch	·	1.3 km	MPC · JPL
681228	2004 TP_{289}	—	October 10, 2004	Kitt Peak	Spacewatch	·	1.8 km	MPC · JPL
681229	2004 TU_{289}	—	October 10, 2004	Kitt Peak	Spacewatch	(5)	880 m	MPC · JPL
681230	2004 TG_{294}	—	October 10, 2004	Kitt Peak	Spacewatch	·	1.9 km	MPC · JPL
681231	2004 TZ_{296}	—	October 10, 2004	Kitt Peak	Spacewatch	·	680 m	MPC · JPL
681232	2004 TK_{317}	—	October 11, 2004	Kitt Peak	Spacewatch	·	2.0 km	MPC · JPL
681233	2004 TA_{318}	—	October 11, 2004	Kitt Peak	Spacewatch	VER	2.2 km	MPC · JPL
681234	2004 TP_{319}	—	October 11, 2004	Kitt Peak	Spacewatch	·	1.9 km	MPC · JPL
681235	2004 TP_{326}	—	October 14, 2004	Palomar	NEAT	TIR	2.5 km	MPC · JPL
681236	2004 TQ_{333}	—	October 9, 2004	Kitt Peak	Spacewatch	AEO	1.0 km	MPC · JPL
681237	2004 TR_{338}	—	October 12, 2004	Kitt Peak	Spacewatch	·	550 m	MPC · JPL
681238	2004 TV_{342}	—	October 13, 2004	Kitt Peak	Spacewatch	EUN	830 m	MPC · JPL
681239	2004 TR_{352}	—	September 11, 2004	Kitt Peak	Spacewatch	·	1.4 km	MPC · JPL
681240	2004 TG_{354}	—	October 15, 2004	Mount Lemmon	Mount Lemmon Survey	·	1.5 km	MPC · JPL
681241	2004 TZ_{362}	—	April 3, 2020	Mount Lemmon	Mount Lemmon Survey	·	1.0 km	MPC · JPL
681242	2004 TM_{372}	—	September 24, 2011	Mount Lemmon	Mount Lemmon Survey	·	660 m	MPC · JPL
681243	2004 TJ_{373}	—	April 25, 2003	Kitt Peak	Spacewatch	·	1.2 km	MPC · JPL
681244	2004 TS_{373}	—	March 18, 2010	Mount Lemmon	Mount Lemmon Survey	NYS	1.0 km	MPC · JPL
681245	2004 TW_{373}	—	October 8, 2004	Kitt Peak	Spacewatch	·	1.1 km	MPC · JPL
681246	2004 TE_{374}	—	September 9, 2015	Haleakala	Pan-STARRS 1	·	2.5 km	MPC · JPL
681247	2004 TK_{375}	—	September 21, 2008	Mount Lemmon	Mount Lemmon Survey	·	1.2 km	MPC · JPL
681248	2004 TX_{375}	—	February 20, 2002	Kitt Peak	Spacewatch	·	1.2 km	MPC · JPL
681249	2004 TZ_{375}	—	September 4, 2008	Kitt Peak	Spacewatch	·	1.1 km	MPC · JPL
681250	2004 TU_{376}	—	September 4, 2008	Kitt Peak	Spacewatch	·	1.2 km	MPC · JPL
681251	2004 TO_{377}	—	April 11, 2015	Mount Lemmon	Mount Lemmon Survey	·	1.2 km	MPC · JPL
681252	2004 TJ_{378}	—	October 4, 2004	Kitt Peak	Spacewatch	·	1.6 km	MPC · JPL
681253	2004 TZ_{378}	—	April 14, 2008	Mount Lemmon	Mount Lemmon Survey	·	1.9 km	MPC · JPL
681254	2004 TK_{379}	—	March 16, 2007	Kitt Peak	Spacewatch	·	1.5 km	MPC · JPL
681255	2004 TY_{381}	—	September 1, 2014	Mount Lemmon	Mount Lemmon Survey	EOS	1.4 km	MPC · JPL
681256	2004 TJ_{382}	—	October 15, 2004	Kitt Peak	Spacewatch	·	1.3 km	MPC · JPL
681257	2004 TJ_{383}	—	October 15, 2004	Mount Lemmon	Mount Lemmon Survey	·	1.2 km	MPC · JPL
681258	2004 TG_{387}	—	October 9, 2004	Kitt Peak	Spacewatch	·	2.1 km	MPC · JPL
681259	2004 TH_{387}	—	October 15, 2004	Kitt Peak	Spacewatch	MAR	790 m	MPC · JPL
681260	2004 TK_{387}	—	October 11, 2004	Kitt Peak	Deep Ecliptic Survey	·	1.2 km	MPC · JPL
681261	2004 TO_{387}	—	October 11, 2004	Kitt Peak	Deep Ecliptic Survey	VER	1.9 km	MPC · JPL
681262	2004 UY_{11}	—	September 6, 2008	Mount Lemmon	Mount Lemmon Survey	·	1.3 km	MPC · JPL
681263	2004 UZ_{11}	—	November 1, 2013	Mount Lemmon	Mount Lemmon Survey	·	1.1 km	MPC · JPL
681264	2004 VN_{33}	—	November 3, 2004	Kitt Peak	Spacewatch	LIX	3.0 km	MPC · JPL
681265	2004 VJ_{39}	—	November 4, 2004	Kitt Peak	Spacewatch	·	790 m	MPC · JPL
681266	2004 VK_{39}	—	October 15, 2004	Kitt Peak	Spacewatch	·	1.1 km	MPC · JPL
681267	2004 VH_{50}	—	November 4, 2004	Kitt Peak	Spacewatch	·	1.3 km	MPC · JPL
681268	2004 VU_{51}	—	November 4, 2004	Kitt Peak	Spacewatch	·	1.1 km	MPC · JPL
681269	2004 VT_{55}	—	November 4, 2004	Kitt Peak	Spacewatch	·	1.7 km	MPC · JPL
681270	2004 VB_{67}	—	November 10, 2004	Kitt Peak	Spacewatch	·	2.1 km	MPC · JPL
681271	2004 VZ_{67}	—	November 10, 2004	Kitt Peak	Deep Ecliptic Survey	·	2.4 km	MPC · JPL
681272	2004 VR_{69}	—	November 14, 2004	Ottmarsheim	C. Rinner	T_{j} (2.97) · 3:2	5.2 km	MPC · JPL
681273	2004 VW_{78}	—	November 3, 2004	Kitt Peak	Spacewatch	·	730 m	MPC · JPL
681274	2004 VG_{94}	—	November 10, 2004	Kitt Peak	Deep Ecliptic Survey	VER	1.9 km	MPC · JPL
681275	2004 VK_{94}	—	November 10, 2004	Kitt Peak	Deep Ecliptic Survey	·	1.4 km	MPC · JPL
681276	2004 VX_{98}	—	November 9, 2004	Mauna Kea	Veillet, C.	MAS	500 m	MPC · JPL
681277	2004 VO_{100}	—	November 9, 2004	Mauna Kea	Veillet, C.	V	400 m	MPC · JPL
681278	2004 VA_{101}	—	November 9, 2004	Mauna Kea	Veillet, C.	THM	2.0 km	MPC · JPL
681279	2004 VD_{113}	—	March 16, 2007	Mount Lemmon	Mount Lemmon Survey	·	2.9 km	MPC · JPL
681280	2004 VV_{130}	—	November 9, 2004	Mauna Kea	P. A. Wiegert, A. Papadimos	plutino	155 km	MPC · JPL
681281	2004 VX_{132}	—	December 28, 2016	Mount Lemmon	Mount Lemmon Survey	·	3.4 km	MPC · JPL
681282	2004 VF_{135}	—	March 26, 2007	Mount Lemmon	Mount Lemmon Survey	·	2.0 km	MPC · JPL
681283	2004 VO_{135}	—	October 25, 2013	Mount Lemmon	Mount Lemmon Survey	·	1.1 km	MPC · JPL
681284	2004 VX_{135}	—	July 5, 2016	Mount Lemmon	Mount Lemmon Survey	·	1.2 km	MPC · JPL
681285	2004 VA_{136}	—	October 27, 2011	Mount Lemmon	Mount Lemmon Survey	·	720 m	MPC · JPL
681286	2004 VF_{136}	—	March 29, 2015	Haleakala	Pan-STARRS 1	HNS	870 m	MPC · JPL
681287	2004 VS_{137}	—	September 20, 2011	Catalina	CSS	·	750 m	MPC · JPL
681288	2004 WT_{4}	—	November 18, 2004	Campo Imperatore	CINEOS	·	1.2 km	MPC · JPL
681289	2004 WH_{13}	—	November 20, 2004	Kitt Peak	Spacewatch	TIR	2.4 km	MPC · JPL
681290	2004 WA_{14}	—	November 19, 2004	Catalina	CSS	·	2.5 km	MPC · JPL
681291	2004 XM	—	December 1, 2004	Catalina	CSS	BAR	1.4 km	MPC · JPL
681292	2004 XR_{53}	—	December 10, 2004	Kitt Peak	Spacewatch	·	2.7 km	MPC · JPL
681293	2004 XH_{91}	—	December 11, 2004	Kitt Peak	Spacewatch	3:2	5.3 km	MPC · JPL
681294	2004 XE_{113}	—	December 10, 2004	Kitt Peak	Spacewatch	·	910 m	MPC · JPL
681295	2004 XO_{140}	—	December 13, 2004	Kitt Peak	Spacewatch	·	1.1 km	MPC · JPL
681296	2004 XK_{164}	—	December 10, 2004	Calvin-Rehoboth	L. A. Molnar	·	900 m	MPC · JPL
681297	2004 XA_{174}	—	December 3, 2000	Kitt Peak	Spacewatch	·	1.3 km	MPC · JPL
681298	2004 XC_{194}	—	July 29, 2009	Kitt Peak	Spacewatch	·	2.1 km	MPC · JPL
681299	2004 XK_{194}	—	August 14, 2012	Haleakala	Pan-STARRS 1	·	1.6 km	MPC · JPL
681300	2004 XP_{194}	—	August 28, 2014	Haleakala	Pan-STARRS 1	V	510 m	MPC · JPL

== 681301–681400 ==
back to top

Designation			Discovery			Properties		Ref
Permanent	Provisional	Named after	Date	Site	Discoverer(s)	Category	Diam.	Ref
681301	2004 XY_{194}	—	October 7, 2008	Mount Lemmon	Mount Lemmon Survey	·	1.4 km	MPC · JPL
681302	2004 XC_{197}	—	August 26, 2017	XuYi	PMO NEO Survey Program	·	1.7 km	MPC · JPL
681303	2004 XG_{199}	—	December 2, 2004	Palomar	NEAT	·	3.5 km	MPC · JPL
681304	2004 XR_{199}	—	October 8, 2008	Mount Lemmon	Mount Lemmon Survey	·	1.1 km	MPC · JPL
681305	2004 YH_{6}	—	December 16, 2004	Kitt Peak	Spacewatch	·	920 m	MPC · JPL
681306	2004 YJ_{38}	—	April 17, 2016	Mount Lemmon	Mount Lemmon Survey	H	400 m	MPC · JPL
681307	2004 YT_{38}	—	October 27, 2009	Mount Lemmon	Mount Lemmon Survey	EOS	1.9 km	MPC · JPL
681308	2004 YY_{39}	—	November 11, 2013	Mount Lemmon	Mount Lemmon Survey	·	1.5 km	MPC · JPL
681309	2004 YC_{40}	—	January 27, 2006	Mount Lemmon	Mount Lemmon Survey	THM	2.0 km	MPC · JPL
681310	2004 YM_{41}	—	December 18, 2004	Mount Lemmon	Mount Lemmon Survey	·	1.5 km	MPC · JPL
681311	2005 AV_{63}	—	January 13, 2005	Kitt Peak	Spacewatch	PAD	1.4 km	MPC · JPL
681312	2005 AQ_{65}	—	January 13, 2005	Kitt Peak	Spacewatch	·	1.0 km	MPC · JPL
681313	2005 AZ_{83}	—	September 17, 2009	Kitt Peak	Spacewatch	·	2.2 km	MPC · JPL
681314	2005 AJ_{84}	—	January 8, 2005	Campo Imperatore	CINEOS	·	1.8 km	MPC · JPL
681315	2005 AC_{85}	—	September 7, 2008	Mount Lemmon	Mount Lemmon Survey	·	1.7 km	MPC · JPL
681316	2005 AE_{85}	—	January 7, 2005	Catalina	CSS	·	1.8 km	MPC · JPL
681317	2005 AQ_{85}	—	January 13, 2005	Catalina	CSS	·	2.0 km	MPC · JPL
681318	2005 BK_{5}	—	January 16, 2005	Socorro	LINEAR	(5)	1.1 km	MPC · JPL
681319	2005 BA_{12}	—	January 17, 2005	Kitt Peak	Spacewatch	EOS	2.0 km	MPC · JPL
681320	2005 BD_{17}	—	January 16, 2005	Kitt Peak	Spacewatch	·	1.6 km	MPC · JPL
681321	2005 BM_{26}	—	January 18, 2005	Kitt Peak	Spacewatch	·	1.3 km	MPC · JPL
681322	2005 BF_{30}	—	January 16, 2005	Mauna Kea	Veillet, C.	·	980 m	MPC · JPL
681323	2005 BU_{35}	—	January 16, 2005	Mauna Kea	Veillet, C.	·	2.1 km	MPC · JPL
681324	2005 BB_{38}	—	January 16, 2005	Mauna Kea	Veillet, C.	·	1.9 km	MPC · JPL
681325	2005 BR_{41}	—	March 3, 2005	La Silla	Gauderon, R., Behrend, R.	·	1.6 km	MPC · JPL
681326	2005 BS_{45}	—	January 16, 2005	Mauna Kea	Veillet, C.	·	1.1 km	MPC · JPL
681327	2005 BP_{47}	—	January 16, 2005	Mauna Kea	P. A. Wiegert, D. D. Balam	·	2.3 km	MPC · JPL
681328	2005 BC_{51}	—	August 13, 2010	Kitt Peak	Spacewatch	·	630 m	MPC · JPL
681329	2005 BG_{51}	—	February 22, 2009	Kitt Peak	Spacewatch	·	1.1 km	MPC · JPL
681330	2005 BB_{56}	—	January 4, 2016	Haleakala	Pan-STARRS 1	·	930 m	MPC · JPL
681331	2005 BC_{56}	—	January 16, 2005	Kitt Peak	Spacewatch	·	1.1 km	MPC · JPL
681332	2005 BT_{56}	—	November 19, 2009	Mount Lemmon	Mount Lemmon Survey	·	2.1 km	MPC · JPL
681333	2005 CD_{28}	—	February 1, 2005	Kitt Peak	Spacewatch	·	1.4 km	MPC · JPL
681334	2005 CB_{32}	—	February 1, 2005	Kitt Peak	Spacewatch	·	2.2 km	MPC · JPL
681335	2005 CM_{33}	—	February 2, 2005	Kitt Peak	Spacewatch	EOS	1.5 km	MPC · JPL
681336	2005 CU_{54}	—	February 4, 2005	Mount Lemmon	Mount Lemmon Survey	(7744)	1.4 km	MPC · JPL
681337	2005 CE_{55}	—	February 4, 2005	Mount Lemmon	Mount Lemmon Survey	·	2.8 km	MPC · JPL
681338	2005 CP_{66}	—	February 9, 2005	Mount Lemmon	Mount Lemmon Survey	·	850 m	MPC · JPL
681339	2005 CM_{70}	—	March 8, 2005	Mount Lemmon	Mount Lemmon Survey	·	1.5 km	MPC · JPL
681340	2005 CJ_{81}	—	December 31, 2013	Mount Lemmon	Mount Lemmon Survey	·	1.6 km	MPC · JPL
681341	2005 CV_{81}	—	February 9, 2005	Mount Lemmon	Mount Lemmon Survey	·	1.7 km	MPC · JPL
681342	2005 CQ_{82}	—	April 9, 2014	Kitt Peak	Spacewatch	3:2	4.6 km	MPC · JPL
681343	2005 CT_{82}	—	February 14, 2005	Kitt Peak	Spacewatch	NEM	2.0 km	MPC · JPL
681344	2005 CK_{83}	—	March 29, 2014	Catalina	CSS	·	1.4 km	MPC · JPL
681345	2005 CY_{84}	—	February 4, 2005	Kitt Peak	Spacewatch	·	2.7 km	MPC · JPL
681346	2005 CB_{85}	—	February 14, 2005	Catalina	CSS	·	870 m	MPC · JPL
681347	2005 CL_{85}	—	September 2, 2014	Haleakala	Pan-STARRS 1	·	620 m	MPC · JPL
681348	2005 CB_{86}	—	December 29, 2008	Mount Lemmon	Mount Lemmon Survey	·	1.1 km	MPC · JPL
681349	2005 CJ_{86}	—	January 1, 2014	Mount Lemmon	Mount Lemmon Survey	·	1.2 km	MPC · JPL
681350	2005 CS_{86}	—	February 4, 2005	Mount Lemmon	Mount Lemmon Survey	·	1.6 km	MPC · JPL
681351	2005 CN_{88}	—	September 23, 2014	Mount Lemmon	Mount Lemmon Survey	·	1.1 km	MPC · JPL
681352	2005 CM_{89}	—	February 4, 2005	Mount Lemmon	Mount Lemmon Survey	·	870 m	MPC · JPL
681353	2005 DS_{3}	—	August 9, 2013	Haleakala	Pan-STARRS 1	NYS	1.1 km	MPC · JPL
681354	2005 EX_{3}	—	March 1, 2005	Kitt Peak	Spacewatch	·	2.3 km	MPC · JPL
681355	2005 ET_{17}	—	March 3, 2005	Kitt Peak	Spacewatch	·	1.3 km	MPC · JPL
681356	2005 EX_{29}	—	February 14, 2005	Rehoboth	L. A. Molnar	·	2.8 km	MPC · JPL
681357	2005 EY_{39}	—	March 1, 2005	Kitt Peak	Spacewatch	·	840 m	MPC · JPL
681358	2005 ES_{52}	—	March 4, 2005	Kitt Peak	Spacewatch	MAS	550 m	MPC · JPL
681359	2005 EO_{55}	—	March 4, 2005	Kitt Peak	Spacewatch	AGN	1 km	MPC · JPL
681360	2005 EO_{57}	—	March 4, 2005	Mount Lemmon	Mount Lemmon Survey	·	870 m	MPC · JPL
681361	2005 EO_{97}	—	March 3, 2005	Catalina	CSS	·	1.1 km	MPC · JPL
681362	2005 EC_{129}	—	March 9, 2005	Kitt Peak	Spacewatch	NEM	2.1 km	MPC · JPL
681363	2005 EF_{129}	—	March 9, 2005	Kitt Peak	Spacewatch	·	1 km	MPC · JPL
681364	2005 EN_{143}	—	March 10, 2005	Mount Lemmon	Mount Lemmon Survey	·	1.0 km	MPC · JPL
681365	2005 EL_{144}	—	March 10, 2005	Mount Lemmon	Mount Lemmon Survey	·	3.2 km	MPC · JPL
681366	2005 ES_{145}	—	March 10, 2005	Mount Lemmon	Mount Lemmon Survey	·	1.4 km	MPC · JPL
681367	2005 EP_{158}	—	March 9, 2005	Mount Lemmon	Mount Lemmon Survey	VER	2.3 km	MPC · JPL
681368	2005 EU_{163}	—	March 10, 2005	Mount Lemmon	Mount Lemmon Survey	·	620 m	MPC · JPL
681369	2005 EB_{186}	—	March 8, 2005	Kitt Peak	Spacewatch	3:2	5.3 km	MPC · JPL
681370	2005 ER_{208}	—	March 4, 2005	Kitt Peak	Spacewatch	·	650 m	MPC · JPL
681371	2005 EU_{208}	—	March 4, 2005	Kitt Peak	Spacewatch	·	2.2 km	MPC · JPL
681372	2005 ED_{237}	—	March 11, 2005	Kitt Peak	Spacewatch	·	560 m	MPC · JPL
681373	2005 EC_{255}	—	March 11, 2005	Mount Lemmon	Mount Lemmon Survey	·	2.7 km	MPC · JPL
681374	2005 EG_{257}	—	September 21, 2003	Kitt Peak	Spacewatch	·	870 m	MPC · JPL
681375	2005 EY_{258}	—	March 11, 2005	Mount Lemmon	Mount Lemmon Survey	NYS	880 m	MPC · JPL
681376	2005 EJ_{298}	—	March 10, 2005	Mount Lemmon	Mount Lemmon Survey	·	1.3 km	MPC · JPL
681377	2005 EO_{299}	—	March 11, 2005	Kitt Peak	Deep Ecliptic Survey	DOR	1.5 km	MPC · JPL
681378	2005 EB_{303}	—	March 11, 2005	Kitt Peak	Deep Ecliptic Survey	·	870 m	MPC · JPL
681379	2005 EM_{309}	—	March 9, 2005	Mount Lemmon	Mount Lemmon Survey	·	2.8 km	MPC · JPL
681380	2005 EE_{314}	—	March 10, 2005	Kitt Peak	Deep Ecliptic Survey	HYG	2.4 km	MPC · JPL
681381	2005 EZ_{314}	—	March 11, 2005	Kitt Peak	Deep Ecliptic Survey	·	470 m	MPC · JPL
681382	2005 EF_{316}	—	March 11, 2005	Mount Lemmon	Mount Lemmon Survey	·	1.6 km	MPC · JPL
681383	2005 EE_{333}	—	March 10, 2005	Mount Lemmon	Mount Lemmon Survey	·	860 m	MPC · JPL
681384	2005 EM_{334}	—	March 9, 2005	Mount Lemmon	Mount Lemmon Survey	THM	2.3 km	MPC · JPL
681385	2005 EA_{335}	—	March 12, 2005	Kitt Peak	Deep Ecliptic Survey	V	500 m	MPC · JPL
681386	2005 ES_{335}	—	September 17, 2006	Kitt Peak	Spacewatch	·	980 m	MPC · JPL
681387	2005 EA_{336}	—	March 11, 2005	Mount Lemmon	Mount Lemmon Survey	VER	2.5 km	MPC · JPL
681388	2005 EC_{336}	—	March 23, 2012	Mount Lemmon	Mount Lemmon Survey	·	3.0 km	MPC · JPL
681389	2005 ER_{336}	—	March 28, 2014	Mount Lemmon	Mount Lemmon Survey	NEM	1.9 km	MPC · JPL
681390	2005 EV_{336}	—	March 12, 2005	Kitt Peak	Spacewatch	·	940 m	MPC · JPL
681391	2005 EM_{337}	—	August 29, 2006	Kitt Peak	Spacewatch	·	1.6 km	MPC · JPL
681392	2005 EQ_{337}	—	March 13, 2005	Kitt Peak	Spacewatch	·	890 m	MPC · JPL
681393	2005 EZ_{337}	—	February 13, 2013	Haleakala	Pan-STARRS 1	H	350 m	MPC · JPL
681394	2005 EC_{338}	—	March 13, 2005	Kitt Peak	Spacewatch	·	2.9 km	MPC · JPL
681395	2005 EL_{340}	—	September 11, 2007	Kitt Peak	Spacewatch	·	1.5 km	MPC · JPL
681396	2005 EP_{340}	—	October 7, 2008	Mount Lemmon	Mount Lemmon Survey	·	2.4 km	MPC · JPL
681397	2005 EH_{342}	—	January 9, 2014	Haleakala	Pan-STARRS 1	·	1.4 km	MPC · JPL
681398	2005 EC_{344}	—	September 12, 2016	Mount Lemmon	Mount Lemmon Survey	·	1.8 km	MPC · JPL
681399	2005 EE_{347}	—	February 28, 2009	Kitt Peak	Spacewatch	MAS	510 m	MPC · JPL
681400	2005 ED_{349}	—	September 10, 2007	Kitt Peak	Spacewatch	·	2.9 km	MPC · JPL

== 681401–681500 ==
back to top

Designation			Discovery			Properties		Ref
Permanent	Provisional	Named after	Date	Site	Discoverer(s)	Category	Diam.	Ref
681401	2005 EU_{350}	—	March 12, 2005	Kitt Peak	Spacewatch	·	2.0 km	MPC · JPL
681402	2005 EV_{350}	—	March 10, 2005	Mount Lemmon	Mount Lemmon Survey	·	480 m	MPC · JPL
681403	2005 EY_{350}	—	March 9, 2005	Mount Lemmon	Mount Lemmon Survey	·	1.8 km	MPC · JPL
681404	2005 EC_{351}	—	March 11, 2005	Mount Lemmon	Mount Lemmon Survey	·	1.7 km	MPC · JPL
681405	2005 EL_{351}	—	March 9, 2005	Mount Lemmon	Mount Lemmon Survey	MRX	780 m	MPC · JPL
681406	2005 FV_{12}	—	May 22, 2015	Haleakala	Pan-STARRS 1	·	1.6 km	MPC · JPL
681407	2005 FD_{18}	—	August 10, 2007	Kitt Peak	Spacewatch	·	2.9 km	MPC · JPL
681408	2005 FG_{20}	—	March 16, 2005	Mount Lemmon	Mount Lemmon Survey	·	1.1 km	MPC · JPL
681409	2005 FT_{20}	—	October 17, 2012	Haleakala	Pan-STARRS 1	·	1.3 km	MPC · JPL
681410	2005 GS_{17}	—	March 11, 2005	Mount Lemmon	Mount Lemmon Survey	·	1.7 km	MPC · JPL
681411	2005 GR_{18}	—	March 12, 2005	Kitt Peak	Spacewatch	·	2.4 km	MPC · JPL
681412	2005 GS_{18}	—	October 22, 2003	Apache Point	SDSS	·	1.5 km	MPC · JPL
681413	2005 GU_{30}	—	April 4, 2005	Mount Lemmon	Mount Lemmon Survey	·	1.1 km	MPC · JPL
681414	2005 GJ_{47}	—	April 5, 2005	Mount Lemmon	Mount Lemmon Survey	·	1.3 km	MPC · JPL
681415	2005 GW_{47}	—	April 5, 2005	Palomar	NEAT	T_{j} (2.99)	2.2 km	MPC · JPL
681416	2005 GA_{58}	—	April 6, 2005	Mount Lemmon	Mount Lemmon Survey	MAS	550 m	MPC · JPL
681417	2005 GH_{59}	—	April 5, 2005	Anderson Mesa	LONEOS	H	440 m	MPC · JPL
681418	2005 GY_{66}	—	March 10, 2005	Mount Lemmon	Mount Lemmon Survey	·	2.6 km	MPC · JPL
681419	2005 GY_{71}	—	October 20, 2003	Kitt Peak	Spacewatch	·	1.7 km	MPC · JPL
681420	2005 GO_{81}	—	April 2, 2005	Mount Lemmon	Mount Lemmon Survey	·	560 m	MPC · JPL
681421	2005 GH_{87}	—	April 4, 2005	Mount Lemmon	Mount Lemmon Survey	·	600 m	MPC · JPL
681422	2005 GJ_{87}	—	April 4, 2005	Mount Lemmon	Mount Lemmon Survey	·	790 m	MPC · JPL
681423	2005 GX_{91}	—	April 6, 2005	Kitt Peak	Spacewatch	·	1.3 km	MPC · JPL
681424	2005 GO_{115}	—	April 11, 2005	Kitt Peak	Spacewatch	GEF	1.1 km	MPC · JPL
681425	2005 GC_{122}	—	May 30, 2006	Mount Lemmon	Mount Lemmon Survey	·	1.4 km	MPC · JPL
681426	2005 GD_{133}	—	April 10, 2005	Kitt Peak	Spacewatch	·	460 m	MPC · JPL
681427	2005 GZ_{133}	—	April 10, 2005	Kitt Peak	Spacewatch	·	800 m	MPC · JPL
681428	2005 GM_{134}	—	April 10, 2005	Mount Lemmon	Mount Lemmon Survey	·	2.9 km	MPC · JPL
681429	2005 GG_{147}	—	April 11, 2005	Kitt Peak	Spacewatch	·	2.9 km	MPC · JPL
681430	2005 GR_{160}	—	April 2, 2005	Kitt Peak	Spacewatch	H	400 m	MPC · JPL
681431	2005 GQ_{169}	—	April 12, 2005	Kitt Peak	Spacewatch	·	1.5 km	MPC · JPL
681432	2005 GR_{172}	—	April 14, 2005	Kitt Peak	Spacewatch	·	860 m	MPC · JPL
681433	2005 GJ_{189}	—	March 11, 2005	Kitt Peak	Deep Ecliptic Survey	·	1.3 km	MPC · JPL
681434	2005 GM_{190}	—	March 4, 2005	Mount Lemmon	Mount Lemmon Survey	·	870 m	MPC · JPL
681435	2005 GK_{195}	—	April 10, 2005	Kitt Peak	Deep Ecliptic Survey	·	1.0 km	MPC · JPL
681436	2005 GL_{196}	—	April 10, 2005	Kitt Peak	Deep Ecliptic Survey	EOS	2.3 km	MPC · JPL
681437	2005 GJ_{199}	—	April 10, 2005	Kitt Peak	Deep Ecliptic Survey	·	1.4 km	MPC · JPL
681438	2005 GH_{204}	—	April 10, 2005	Mount Lemmon	Mount Lemmon Survey	·	1.3 km	MPC · JPL
681439	2005 GX_{205}	—	April 1, 2005	Kitt Peak	Spacewatch	(5)	1.1 km	MPC · JPL
681440	2005 GG_{207}	—	April 11, 2005	Mount Lemmon	Mount Lemmon Survey	·	2.8 km	MPC · JPL
681441	2005 GT_{222}	—	April 10, 2005	Kitt Peak	Spacewatch	·	1.3 km	MPC · JPL
681442	2005 GK_{223}	—	April 10, 2005	Kitt Peak	Spacewatch	·	910 m	MPC · JPL
681443	2005 GA_{231}	—	May 21, 2015	Haleakala	Pan-STARRS 1	·	1.4 km	MPC · JPL
681444	2005 GC_{231}	—	April 1, 2005	Kitt Peak	Spacewatch	·	1.4 km	MPC · JPL
681445	2005 GJ_{231}	—	April 13, 2005	Kitt Peak	Spacewatch	PHO	770 m	MPC · JPL
681446	2005 GW_{231}	—	October 10, 2007	Kitt Peak	Spacewatch	HOF	1.8 km	MPC · JPL
681447	2005 GE_{232}	—	February 26, 2014	Kitt Peak	Spacewatch	·	1.9 km	MPC · JPL
681448	2005 GW_{233}	—	September 15, 2013	Mount Lemmon	Mount Lemmon Survey	·	2.6 km	MPC · JPL
681449	2005 GH_{234}	—	October 4, 2016	Mount Lemmon	Mount Lemmon Survey	·	2.2 km	MPC · JPL
681450	2005 GJ_{234}	—	April 10, 2014	Haleakala	Pan-STARRS 1	·	1.7 km	MPC · JPL
681451	2005 GM_{235}	—	April 18, 2015	Haleakala	Pan-STARRS 1	·	1.9 km	MPC · JPL
681452	2005 GF_{236}	—	June 13, 2012	Haleakala	Pan-STARRS 1	·	670 m	MPC · JPL
681453	2005 GH_{237}	—	December 23, 2013	Mount Lemmon	Mount Lemmon Survey	·	2.7 km	MPC · JPL
681454	2005 GZ_{237}	—	March 8, 2013	Haleakala	Pan-STARRS 1	3:2	4.6 km	MPC · JPL
681455	2005 GB_{238}	—	March 1, 2009	Kitt Peak	Spacewatch	·	1.2 km	MPC · JPL
681456	2005 GA_{239}	—	April 13, 2005	Catalina	CSS	·	1.3 km	MPC · JPL
681457	2005 HV_{10}	—	April 30, 2005	Kitt Peak	Spacewatch	·	1.3 km	MPC · JPL
681458	2005 HP_{11}	—	April 16, 2005	Kitt Peak	Spacewatch	NYS	1.0 km	MPC · JPL
681459	2005 HT_{11}	—	April 30, 2005	Kitt Peak	Spacewatch	·	1.5 km	MPC · JPL
681460	2005 HF_{12}	—	February 5, 2016	Haleakala	Pan-STARRS 1	·	880 m	MPC · JPL
681461	2005 HZ_{12}	—	April 17, 2005	Kitt Peak	Spacewatch	·	1.2 km	MPC · JPL
681462	2005 JN_{9}	—	May 4, 2005	Mauna Kea	Veillet, C.	·	2.0 km	MPC · JPL
681463	2005 JZ_{11}	—	May 4, 2005	Mauna Kea	Veillet, C.	·	890 m	MPC · JPL
681464	2005 JY_{22}	—	May 2, 2005	Kitt Peak	Spacewatch	·	570 m	MPC · JPL
681465	2005 JP_{24}	—	May 3, 2005	Kitt Peak	Spacewatch	·	1.5 km	MPC · JPL
681466	2005 JT_{36}	—	May 4, 2005	Kitt Peak	Spacewatch	·	1.9 km	MPC · JPL
681467	2005 JD_{41}	—	May 7, 2005	Mount Lemmon	Mount Lemmon Survey	·	1.4 km	MPC · JPL
681468	2005 JK_{43}	—	May 8, 2005	Mount Lemmon	Mount Lemmon Survey	KOR	1.2 km	MPC · JPL
681469	2005 JF_{50}	—	May 4, 2005	Kitt Peak	Spacewatch	·	1.4 km	MPC · JPL
681470	2005 JF_{57}	—	May 7, 2005	Kitt Peak	Spacewatch	·	1.1 km	MPC · JPL
681471	2005 JA_{66}	—	May 4, 2005	Mount Lemmon	Mount Lemmon Survey	PHO	840 m	MPC · JPL
681472	2005 JB_{70}	—	May 7, 2005	Kitt Peak	Spacewatch	·	1.1 km	MPC · JPL
681473	2005 JJ_{73}	—	May 8, 2005	Kitt Peak	Spacewatch	RAF	650 m	MPC · JPL
681474	2005 JW_{79}	—	November 5, 1999	Kitt Peak	Spacewatch	·	750 m	MPC · JPL
681475	2005 JK_{88}	—	May 10, 2005	Mount Lemmon	Mount Lemmon Survey	·	830 m	MPC · JPL
681476	2005 JM_{90}	—	May 11, 2005	Mount Lemmon	Mount Lemmon Survey	·	890 m	MPC · JPL
681477	2005 JR_{95}	—	May 8, 2005	Kitt Peak	Spacewatch	·	1.8 km	MPC · JPL
681478	2005 JV_{101}	—	May 9, 2005	Kitt Peak	Spacewatch	VER	2.6 km	MPC · JPL
681479	2005 JR_{110}	—	May 8, 2005	Kitt Peak	Spacewatch	·	900 m	MPC · JPL
681480	2005 JQ_{115}	—	May 10, 2005	Kitt Peak	Spacewatch	·	1.8 km	MPC · JPL
681481	2005 JU_{125}	—	May 11, 2005	Kitt Peak	Spacewatch	PHO	520 m	MPC · JPL
681482	2005 JW_{142}	—	May 16, 2005	Palomar	NEAT	·	3.5 km	MPC · JPL
681483	2005 JE_{143}	—	May 15, 2005	Mount Lemmon	Mount Lemmon Survey	KON	1.6 km	MPC · JPL
681484	2005 JA_{154}	—	May 4, 2005	Kitt Peak	Spacewatch	·	1.7 km	MPC · JPL
681485	2005 JL_{157}	—	May 4, 2005	Siding Spring	SSS	·	730 m	MPC · JPL
681486	2005 JV_{159}	—	May 7, 2005	Mount Lemmon	Mount Lemmon Survey	·	930 m	MPC · JPL
681487	2005 JL_{163}	—	May 9, 2005	Kitt Peak	Spacewatch	·	840 m	MPC · JPL
681488	2005 JG_{186}	—	April 10, 2005	Mount Lemmon	Mount Lemmon Survey	·	1.2 km	MPC · JPL
681489	2005 JX_{187}	—	April 4, 2014	Haleakala	Pan-STARRS 1	·	1.8 km	MPC · JPL
681490	2005 JS_{190}	—	November 2, 2008	Mount Lemmon	Mount Lemmon Survey	·	3.6 km	MPC · JPL
681491	2005 JV_{190}	—	February 8, 2013	Haleakala	Pan-STARRS 1	·	1.3 km	MPC · JPL
681492	2005 JS_{191}	—	December 24, 2017	Haleakala	Pan-STARRS 1	·	1.6 km	MPC · JPL
681493	2005 JN_{192}	—	March 24, 2014	Haleakala	Pan-STARRS 1	615	1.1 km	MPC · JPL
681494	2005 JY_{193}	—	September 18, 2007	Mount Lemmon	Mount Lemmon Survey	·	2.0 km	MPC · JPL
681495	2005 JT_{194}	—	May 4, 2005	Mount Lemmon	Mount Lemmon Survey	VER	2.6 km	MPC · JPL
681496	2005 KB_{13}	—	May 11, 2005	Palomar	NEAT	·	1.2 km	MPC · JPL
681497	2005 KF_{15}	—	May 18, 2005	Palomar	NEAT	JUN	1.2 km	MPC · JPL
681498	2005 LC_{41}	—	June 10, 2005	Kitt Peak	Spacewatch	·	1.0 km	MPC · JPL
681499	2005 LR_{55}	—	January 17, 2013	Haleakala	Pan-STARRS 1	·	1.9 km	MPC · JPL
681500	2005 LG_{56}	—	August 15, 2009	Kitt Peak	Spacewatch	·	770 m	MPC · JPL

== 681501–681600 ==
back to top

Designation			Discovery			Properties		Ref
Permanent	Provisional	Named after	Date	Site	Discoverer(s)	Category	Diam.	Ref
681501	2005 LS_{56}	—	October 14, 2007	Mount Lemmon	Mount Lemmon Survey	·	2.5 km	MPC · JPL
681502	2005 LT_{57}	—	September 17, 2006	Kitt Peak	Spacewatch	·	1.6 km	MPC · JPL
681503	2005 LF_{58}	—	June 4, 2005	Kitt Peak	Spacewatch	EOS	1.4 km	MPC · JPL
681504	2005 MB_{54}	—	June 23, 2005	Palomar	NEAT	EUN	1.6 km	MPC · JPL
681505	2005 MG_{55}	—	June 18, 2005	Mount Lemmon	Mount Lemmon Survey	·	510 m	MPC · JPL
681506	2005 NL_{15}	—	July 2, 2005	Kitt Peak	Spacewatch	·	600 m	MPC · JPL
681507	2005 NM_{17}	—	April 10, 2000	Kitt Peak	Spacewatch	·	1.4 km	MPC · JPL
681508	2005 NM_{30}	—	July 4, 2005	Kitt Peak	Spacewatch	NYS	1.0 km	MPC · JPL
681509	2005 NU_{33}	—	July 5, 2005	Kitt Peak	Spacewatch	·	1.0 km	MPC · JPL
681510	2005 NP_{38}	—	July 6, 2005	Kitt Peak	Spacewatch	·	1.0 km	MPC · JPL
681511	2005 NX_{45}	—	July 5, 2005	Mount Lemmon	Mount Lemmon Survey	·	770 m	MPC · JPL
681512	2005 NS_{46}	—	July 6, 2005	Kitt Peak	Spacewatch	·	1.7 km	MPC · JPL
681513	2005 NQ_{53}	—	June 29, 2005	Kitt Peak	Spacewatch	·	1.8 km	MPC · JPL
681514	2005 NV_{76}	—	July 10, 2005	Kitt Peak	Spacewatch	·	970 m	MPC · JPL
681515	2005 NX_{77}	—	July 11, 2005	Kitt Peak	Spacewatch	·	1.1 km	MPC · JPL
681516	2005 NA_{92}	—	July 5, 2005	Mount Lemmon	Mount Lemmon Survey	HOF	2.3 km	MPC · JPL
681517	2005 NS_{94}	—	July 6, 2005	Kitt Peak	Spacewatch	V	690 m	MPC · JPL
681518	2005 NB_{103}	—	July 7, 2005	Mauna Kea	Veillet, C.	·	1.2 km	MPC · JPL
681519	2005 NL_{113}	—	July 7, 2005	Mauna Kea	Veillet, C.	·	1.2 km	MPC · JPL
681520	2005 NR_{115}	—	July 7, 2005	Mauna Kea	Veillet, C.	NYS	930 m	MPC · JPL
681521	2005 NV_{125}	—	July 7, 2005	Mauna Kea	P. A. Wiegert, A. M. Gilbert	other TNO	181 km	MPC · JPL
681522	2005 NC_{130}	—	March 21, 2017	Haleakala	Pan-STARRS 1	·	3.5 km	MPC · JPL
681523	2005 NX_{131}	—	March 26, 2014	Mount Lemmon	Mount Lemmon Survey	·	1.5 km	MPC · JPL
681524	2005 NF_{132}	—	March 10, 2016	Haleakala	Pan-STARRS 1	SYL	3.6 km	MPC · JPL
681525	2005 OL_{5}	—	July 28, 2005	Palomar	NEAT	·	1.7 km	MPC · JPL
681526	2005 OB_{30}	—	July 31, 2005	Mauna Kea	P. A. Wiegert, D. D. Balam	·	1.3 km	MPC · JPL
681527	2005 PG_{11}	—	July 12, 2005	Mount Lemmon	Mount Lemmon Survey	·	530 m	MPC · JPL
681528	2005 PR_{31}	—	April 10, 2016	Haleakala	Pan-STARRS 1	·	990 m	MPC · JPL
681529	2005 PZ_{32}	—	August 6, 2005	Palomar	NEAT	·	1.2 km	MPC · JPL
681530	2005 QW	—	August 22, 2005	Palomar	NEAT	·	570 m	MPC · JPL
681531	2005 QO_{5}	—	July 5, 2005	Mount Lemmon	Mount Lemmon Survey	·	520 m	MPC · JPL
681532	2005 QO_{6}	—	July 30, 2005	Palomar	NEAT	·	620 m	MPC · JPL
681533	2005 QY_{15}	—	August 25, 2005	Palomar	NEAT	·	1.6 km	MPC · JPL
681534	2005 QU_{24}	—	August 27, 2005	Kitt Peak	Spacewatch	·	550 m	MPC · JPL
681535	2005 QV_{36}	—	August 25, 2005	Palomar	NEAT	·	590 m	MPC · JPL
681536	2005 QK_{46}	—	August 28, 2005	Kitt Peak	Spacewatch	·	2.5 km	MPC · JPL
681537	2005 QC_{47}	—	August 28, 2005	Kitt Peak	Spacewatch	·	580 m	MPC · JPL
681538	2005 QM_{59}	—	August 25, 2005	Palomar	NEAT	·	610 m	MPC · JPL
681539	2005 QF_{65}	—	August 26, 2005	Palomar	NEAT	·	560 m	MPC · JPL
681540	2005 QZ_{69}	—	July 31, 2005	Palomar	NEAT	·	640 m	MPC · JPL
681541	2005 QW_{100}	—	August 31, 2005	Kitt Peak	Spacewatch	·	1.5 km	MPC · JPL
681542	2005 QX_{107}	—	August 30, 2005	Kitt Peak	Spacewatch	·	560 m	MPC · JPL
681543	2005 QP_{112}	—	August 30, 2005	Kitt Peak	Spacewatch	·	1.1 km	MPC · JPL
681544	2005 QK_{120}	—	August 28, 2005	Kitt Peak	Spacewatch	·	1.3 km	MPC · JPL
681545	2005 QF_{140}	—	August 28, 2005	Kitt Peak	Spacewatch	KOR	1.2 km	MPC · JPL
681546	2005 QF_{144}	—	August 26, 2005	Palomar	NEAT	·	590 m	MPC · JPL
681547	2005 QU_{159}	—	August 28, 2005	Anderson Mesa	LONEOS	·	630 m	MPC · JPL
681548	2005 QA_{166}	—	September 3, 2005	Palomar	NEAT	·	820 m	MPC · JPL
681549	2005 QC_{179}	—	August 25, 2005	Palomar	NEAT	·	660 m	MPC · JPL
681550	2005 QB_{187}	—	August 28, 2005	Kitt Peak	Spacewatch	·	1.5 km	MPC · JPL
681551	2005 QE_{187}	—	September 1, 2005	Kitt Peak	Spacewatch	·	2.3 km	MPC · JPL
681552	2005 QF_{193}	—	August 31, 2005	Kitt Peak	Spacewatch	·	1.1 km	MPC · JPL
681553	2005 QU_{193}	—	March 13, 2013	Mount Lemmon	Mount Lemmon Survey	·	2.0 km	MPC · JPL
681554	2005 QC_{194}	—	September 27, 2009	Kitt Peak	Spacewatch	·	920 m	MPC · JPL
681555	2005 QK_{194}	—	May 26, 2011	Mount Lemmon	Mount Lemmon Survey	·	540 m	MPC · JPL
681556	2005 QM_{194}	—	September 10, 2013	Haleakala	Pan-STARRS 1	·	1.0 km	MPC · JPL
681557	2005 QJ_{196}	—	February 1, 2013	Kitt Peak	Spacewatch	·	2.1 km	MPC · JPL
681558	2005 QR_{197}	—	November 21, 2009	Mount Lemmon	Mount Lemmon Survey	·	650 m	MPC · JPL
681559	2005 QR_{198}	—	December 21, 2006	Kitt Peak	Spacewatch	·	1.8 km	MPC · JPL
681560	2005 QE_{200}	—	August 29, 2005	Palomar	NEAT	·	840 m	MPC · JPL
681561	2005 QQ_{203}	—	August 31, 2005	Kitt Peak	Spacewatch	·	1.3 km	MPC · JPL
681562	2005 QG_{207}	—	August 30, 2005	Kitt Peak	Spacewatch	·	1.2 km	MPC · JPL
681563	2005 QV_{209}	—	August 29, 2005	Kitt Peak	Spacewatch	·	1.3 km	MPC · JPL
681564	2005 QO_{211}	—	December 15, 2014	Mount Lemmon	Mount Lemmon Survey	·	840 m	MPC · JPL
681565	2005 RN_{34}	—	September 3, 2005	Mauna Kea	Veillet, C.	NAE	1.9 km	MPC · JPL
681566	2005 RX_{37}	—	September 3, 2005	Mauna Kea	Veillet, C.	·	1.4 km	MPC · JPL
681567	2005 RE_{50}	—	September 3, 2005	Mauna Kea	P. A. Wiegert	·	1.6 km	MPC · JPL
681568	2005 RY_{53}	—	October 26, 2011	Haleakala	Pan-STARRS 1	·	1.4 km	MPC · JPL
681569	2005 RM_{54}	—	September 1, 2005	Palomar	NEAT	·	870 m	MPC · JPL
681570	2005 RX_{54}	—	May 23, 2015	Mount Lemmon	Mount Lemmon Survey	·	2.4 km	MPC · JPL
681571	2005 RW_{55}	—	April 18, 2009	Mount Lemmon	Mount Lemmon Survey	·	1.4 km	MPC · JPL
681572	2005 RC_{57}	—	September 13, 2005	Kitt Peak	Spacewatch	·	3.2 km	MPC · JPL
681573	2005 RP_{58}	—	February 25, 2011	Mount Lemmon	Mount Lemmon Survey	CLA	1.4 km	MPC · JPL
681574	2005 SK_{48}	—	September 24, 2005	Kitt Peak	Spacewatch	·	2.2 km	MPC · JPL
681575	2005 SU_{66}	—	September 27, 2005	Kitt Peak	Spacewatch	MAS	610 m	MPC · JPL
681576	2005 SG_{108}	—	September 26, 2005	Kitt Peak	Spacewatch	EOS	1.6 km	MPC · JPL
681577	2005 SM_{115}	—	September 27, 2005	Kitt Peak	Spacewatch	·	1.3 km	MPC · JPL
681578	2005 SV_{121}	—	July 30, 2005	Palomar	NEAT	·	840 m	MPC · JPL
681579	2005 SE_{122}	—	September 29, 2005	Kitt Peak	Spacewatch	·	680 m	MPC · JPL
681580	2005 SA_{128}	—	September 29, 2005	Mount Lemmon	Mount Lemmon Survey	NYS	770 m	MPC · JPL
681581	2005 SR_{130}	—	September 29, 2005	Mount Lemmon	Mount Lemmon Survey	·	1.9 km	MPC · JPL
681582	2005 SL_{161}	—	September 27, 2005	Kitt Peak	Spacewatch	·	1.0 km	MPC · JPL
681583	2005 SO_{176}	—	September 29, 2005	Kitt Peak	Spacewatch	KON	1.6 km	MPC · JPL
681584	2005 SG_{180}	—	August 31, 2005	Kitt Peak	Spacewatch	·	570 m	MPC · JPL
681585	2005 SF_{197}	—	September 24, 2005	Kitt Peak	Spacewatch	GAL	2.1 km	MPC · JPL
681586	2005 SK_{201}	—	September 30, 2005	Kitt Peak	Spacewatch	EOS	1.6 km	MPC · JPL
681587	2005 SC_{227}	—	April 4, 2003	Kitt Peak	Spacewatch	·	1.6 km	MPC · JPL
681588	2005 SK_{235}	—	September 29, 2005	Mount Lemmon	Mount Lemmon Survey	·	1.3 km	MPC · JPL
681589	2005 SS_{248}	—	September 30, 2005	Mount Lemmon	Mount Lemmon Survey	·	1.9 km	MPC · JPL
681590	2005 SU_{251}	—	August 27, 2005	Palomar	NEAT	·	610 m	MPC · JPL
681591	2005 SC_{264}	—	September 1, 2005	Palomar	NEAT	·	2.9 km	MPC · JPL
681592	2005 SB_{265}	—	September 26, 2005	Catalina	CSS	BRA	1.5 km	MPC · JPL
681593	2005 SQ_{275}	—	September 29, 2005	Kitt Peak	Spacewatch	·	710 m	MPC · JPL
681594	2005 SX_{276}	—	September 30, 2005	Kitt Peak	Spacewatch	·	610 m	MPC · JPL
681595	2005 SZ_{282}	—	October 5, 2005	Catalina	CSS	·	670 m	MPC · JPL
681596	2005 SE_{286}	—	September 3, 2005	Apache Point	SDSS Collaboration	·	1.6 km	MPC · JPL
681597	2005 SY_{286}	—	October 1, 2005	Apache Point	SDSS Collaboration	·	1.9 km	MPC · JPL
681598	2005 SO_{291}	—	September 24, 2005	Kitt Peak	Spacewatch	·	530 m	MPC · JPL
681599	2005 SO_{293}	—	October 10, 2001	Palomar	NEAT	·	950 m	MPC · JPL
681600	2005 SF_{295}	—	October 3, 2005	Catalina	CSS	·	1.2 km	MPC · JPL

== 681601–681700 ==
back to top

Designation			Discovery			Properties		Ref
Permanent	Provisional	Named after	Date	Site	Discoverer(s)	Category	Diam.	Ref
681601	2005 SJ_{295}	—	September 26, 2005	Catalina	CSS	·	2.1 km	MPC · JPL
681602	2005 SO_{297}	—	March 8, 2008	Mount Lemmon	Mount Lemmon Survey	KOR	1.2 km	MPC · JPL
681603	2005 SH_{298}	—	September 30, 2005	Mauna Kea	A. Boattini	·	1.2 km	MPC · JPL
681604	2005 SA_{300}	—	September 30, 2005	Kitt Peak	Spacewatch	·	1.5 km	MPC · JPL
681605	2005 SV_{300}	—	September 29, 2005	Mount Lemmon	Mount Lemmon Survey	·	1.2 km	MPC · JPL
681606	2005 SU_{304}	—	September 29, 2005	Mount Lemmon	Mount Lemmon Survey	·	1.6 km	MPC · JPL
681607	2005 TD_{9}	—	October 1, 2005	Kitt Peak	Spacewatch	KOR	1.3 km	MPC · JPL
681608	2005 TZ_{20}	—	October 1, 2005	Mount Lemmon	Mount Lemmon Survey	·	2.0 km	MPC · JPL
681609	2005 TV_{22}	—	October 1, 2005	Mount Lemmon	Mount Lemmon Survey	3:2 · SHU	4.0 km	MPC · JPL
681610	2005 TL_{66}	—	August 31, 2005	Kitt Peak	Spacewatch	·	470 m	MPC · JPL
681611	2005 TL_{67}	—	September 26, 2005	Kitt Peak	Spacewatch	·	1.1 km	MPC · JPL
681612	2005 TT_{67}	—	October 5, 2005	Mount Lemmon	Mount Lemmon Survey	·	430 m	MPC · JPL
681613	2005 TZ_{74}	—	October 1, 2005	Kitt Peak	Spacewatch	EOS	1.5 km	MPC · JPL
681614	2005 TD_{96}	—	October 6, 2005	Mount Lemmon	Mount Lemmon Survey	·	810 m	MPC · JPL
681615	2005 TQ_{108}	—	October 7, 2005	Kitt Peak	Spacewatch	VER	2.0 km	MPC · JPL
681616	2005 TP_{118}	—	October 7, 2005	Kitt Peak	Spacewatch	·	2.2 km	MPC · JPL
681617	2005 TO_{119}	—	October 7, 2005	Kitt Peak	Spacewatch	·	970 m	MPC · JPL
681618	2005 TR_{122}	—	September 29, 2005	Mount Lemmon	Mount Lemmon Survey	·	860 m	MPC · JPL
681619	2005 TW_{131}	—	October 7, 2005	Kitt Peak	Spacewatch	EOS	1.4 km	MPC · JPL
681620	2005 TS_{132}	—	October 7, 2005	Kitt Peak	Spacewatch	·	1.9 km	MPC · JPL
681621	2005 TD_{140}	—	October 8, 2005	Kitt Peak	Spacewatch	·	1.8 km	MPC · JPL
681622	2005 TZ_{143}	—	October 8, 2005	Kitt Peak	Spacewatch	·	1.5 km	MPC · JPL
681623	2005 TE_{146}	—	October 8, 2005	Kitt Peak	Spacewatch	KON	1.8 km	MPC · JPL
681624	2005 TJ_{151}	—	October 8, 2005	Kitt Peak	Spacewatch	KOR	1.1 km	MPC · JPL
681625	2005 TU_{155}	—	October 9, 2005	Kitt Peak	Spacewatch	·	1.7 km	MPC · JPL
681626	2005 TD_{159}	—	September 26, 2005	Kitt Peak	Spacewatch	·	2.5 km	MPC · JPL
681627	2005 TB_{163}	—	October 9, 2005	Kitt Peak	Spacewatch	·	1.5 km	MPC · JPL
681628	2005 TV_{173}	—	August 1, 2000	Cerro Tololo	Deep Ecliptic Survey	·	1.7 km	MPC · JPL
681629	2005 TQ_{199}	—	October 4, 2005	Catalina	CSS	·	1.2 km	MPC · JPL
681630	2005 TW_{200}	—	August 15, 2013	Haleakala	Pan-STARRS 1	·	1.1 km	MPC · JPL
681631	2005 TN_{208}	—	October 1, 2005	Mount Lemmon	Mount Lemmon Survey	·	1.7 km	MPC · JPL
681632	2005 TS_{208}	—	October 1, 2005	Mount Lemmon	Mount Lemmon Survey	MAR	620 m	MPC · JPL
681633	2005 TH_{211}	—	October 1, 2005	Mount Lemmon	Mount Lemmon Survey	·	2.0 km	MPC · JPL
681634	2005 TL_{215}	—	October 2, 2005	Mount Lemmon	Mount Lemmon Survey	EOS	1.4 km	MPC · JPL
681635	2005 TJ_{216}	—	October 7, 2005	Kitt Peak	Spacewatch	·	1.8 km	MPC · JPL
681636	2005 TB_{221}	—	October 9, 2005	Kitt Peak	Spacewatch	·	710 m	MPC · JPL
681637	2005 TG_{222}	—	October 12, 2005	Kitt Peak	Spacewatch	EOS	1.6 km	MPC · JPL
681638	2005 TC_{223}	—	October 13, 2005	Kitt Peak	Spacewatch	·	2.3 km	MPC · JPL
681639	2005 TS_{224}	—	October 10, 2005	Kitt Peak	Spacewatch	EUN	710 m	MPC · JPL
681640	2005 US	—	September 29, 2005	Mount Lemmon	Mount Lemmon Survey	EOS	1.5 km	MPC · JPL
681641	2005 UX_{11}	—	October 22, 2005	Kitt Peak	Spacewatch	·	2.0 km	MPC · JPL
681642	2005 UM_{29}	—	October 23, 2005	Catalina	CSS	·	2.1 km	MPC · JPL
681643	2005 UU_{30}	—	October 1, 2005	Mount Lemmon	Mount Lemmon Survey	·	540 m	MPC · JPL
681644	2005 UB_{52}	—	September 25, 2005	Palomar	NEAT	·	1.2 km	MPC · JPL
681645	2005 UA_{68}	—	September 25, 2005	Kitt Peak	Spacewatch	·	590 m	MPC · JPL
681646	2005 UR_{91}	—	October 22, 2005	Kitt Peak	Spacewatch	·	2.0 km	MPC · JPL
681647	2005 UN_{136}	—	October 25, 2005	Mount Lemmon	Mount Lemmon Survey	·	1.9 km	MPC · JPL
681648	2005 UG_{140}	—	October 25, 2005	Mount Lemmon	Mount Lemmon Survey	·	1.8 km	MPC · JPL
681649	2005 UH_{149}	—	October 26, 2005	Kitt Peak	Spacewatch	·	1.1 km	MPC · JPL
681650	2005 UE_{152}	—	October 26, 2005	Kitt Peak	Spacewatch	MAR	790 m	MPC · JPL
681651	2005 UP_{152}	—	October 1, 2005	Mount Lemmon	Mount Lemmon Survey	BRA	1.3 km	MPC · JPL
681652	2005 UW_{164}	—	October 5, 2005	Kitt Peak	Spacewatch	·	1.0 km	MPC · JPL
681653	2005 UX_{169}	—	October 24, 2005	Kitt Peak	Spacewatch	·	600 m	MPC · JPL
681654	2005 UW_{181}	—	October 24, 2005	Kitt Peak	Spacewatch	·	590 m	MPC · JPL
681655	2005 UA_{189}	—	October 27, 2005	Mount Lemmon	Mount Lemmon Survey	KOR	1.1 km	MPC · JPL
681656	2005 UB_{191}	—	October 27, 2005	Mount Lemmon	Mount Lemmon Survey	·	1.2 km	MPC · JPL
681657	2005 US_{197}	—	October 25, 2005	Kitt Peak	Spacewatch	DOR	2.3 km	MPC · JPL
681658	2005 UV_{197}	—	October 1, 2005	Mount Lemmon	Mount Lemmon Survey	·	1.0 km	MPC · JPL
681659	2005 UD_{201}	—	October 1, 2005	Mount Lemmon	Mount Lemmon Survey	·	2.1 km	MPC · JPL
681660	2005 UV_{204}	—	October 1, 2005	Kitt Peak	Spacewatch	·	2.2 km	MPC · JPL
681661	2005 UF_{209}	—	October 27, 2005	Mount Lemmon	Mount Lemmon Survey	·	1.1 km	MPC · JPL
681662	2005 UY_{209}	—	September 30, 2005	Mount Lemmon	Mount Lemmon Survey	EOS	1.4 km	MPC · JPL
681663	2005 UX_{212}	—	October 27, 2005	Kitt Peak	Spacewatch	·	1.6 km	MPC · JPL
681664	2005 UJ_{243}	—	October 25, 2005	Kitt Peak	Spacewatch	EUN	900 m	MPC · JPL
681665	2005 UK_{243}	—	October 25, 2005	Kitt Peak	Spacewatch	·	1.9 km	MPC · JPL
681666	2005 UW_{255}	—	October 24, 2005	Kitt Peak	Spacewatch	EOS	1.7 km	MPC · JPL
681667	2005 UG_{257}	—	October 25, 2005	Kitt Peak	Spacewatch	·	1.9 km	MPC · JPL
681668	2005 US_{263}	—	October 27, 2005	Kitt Peak	Spacewatch	·	1.9 km	MPC · JPL
681669	2005 UJ_{265}	—	October 27, 2005	Kitt Peak	Spacewatch	·	420 m	MPC · JPL
681670	2005 US_{269}	—	October 28, 2005	Mount Lemmon	Mount Lemmon Survey	·	1.9 km	MPC · JPL
681671	2005 UV_{269}	—	October 28, 2005	Mount Lemmon	Mount Lemmon Survey	·	2.0 km	MPC · JPL
681672	2005 UT_{272}	—	October 28, 2005	Kitt Peak	Spacewatch	KOR	1.1 km	MPC · JPL
681673	2005 UA_{277}	—	October 24, 2005	Kitt Peak	Spacewatch	·	1.2 km	MPC · JPL
681674	2005 UL_{277}	—	October 24, 2005	Kitt Peak	Spacewatch	·	2.2 km	MPC · JPL
681675	2005 UO_{284}	—	October 26, 2005	Kitt Peak	Spacewatch	·	490 m	MPC · JPL
681676	2005 UL_{286}	—	October 26, 2005	Kitt Peak	Spacewatch	EOS	1.6 km	MPC · JPL
681677	2005 UN_{291}	—	October 26, 2005	Kitt Peak	Spacewatch	·	1.5 km	MPC · JPL
681678	2005 UX_{298}	—	October 26, 2005	Kitt Peak	Spacewatch	·	1.7 km	MPC · JPL
681679	2005 UN_{301}	—	October 26, 2005	Kitt Peak	Spacewatch	·	730 m	MPC · JPL
681680	2005 UZ_{304}	—	October 26, 2005	Kitt Peak	Spacewatch	V	480 m	MPC · JPL
681681	2005 UK_{306}	—	October 27, 2005	Mount Lemmon	Mount Lemmon Survey	·	970 m	MPC · JPL
681682	2005 US_{309}	—	October 28, 2005	Kitt Peak	Spacewatch	·	1.2 km	MPC · JPL
681683	2005 UB_{315}	—	October 24, 2005	Kitt Peak	Spacewatch	MAR	820 m	MPC · JPL
681684	2005 UJ_{316}	—	October 25, 2005	Mount Lemmon	Mount Lemmon Survey	·	1.2 km	MPC · JPL
681685	2005 UE_{317}	—	October 27, 2005	Mount Lemmon	Mount Lemmon Survey	PHO	730 m	MPC · JPL
681686	2005 UK_{324}	—	October 29, 2005	Kitt Peak	Spacewatch	EOS	1.7 km	MPC · JPL
681687	2005 UH_{330}	—	October 28, 2005	Kitt Peak	Spacewatch	·	670 m	MPC · JPL
681688	2005 UV_{331}	—	October 29, 2005	Kitt Peak	Spacewatch	T_{j} (2.99) · 3:2	4.0 km	MPC · JPL
681689	2005 UC_{346}	—	October 30, 2005	Kitt Peak	Spacewatch	MAR	740 m	MPC · JPL
681690	2005 US_{346}	—	October 30, 2005	Kitt Peak	Spacewatch	·	2.0 km	MPC · JPL
681691	2005 UF_{348}	—	October 22, 2005	Kitt Peak	Spacewatch	·	950 m	MPC · JPL
681692	2005 UK_{356}	—	October 30, 2005	Kitt Peak	Spacewatch	·	1.6 km	MPC · JPL
681693	2005 UN_{356}	—	October 30, 2005	Kitt Peak	Spacewatch	·	1.8 km	MPC · JPL
681694	2005 UQ_{363}	—	October 27, 2005	Kitt Peak	Spacewatch	·	2.1 km	MPC · JPL
681695	2005 UH_{369}	—	October 27, 2005	Kitt Peak	Spacewatch	·	1.9 km	MPC · JPL
681696	2005 UH_{372}	—	October 27, 2005	Kitt Peak	Spacewatch	·	2.1 km	MPC · JPL
681697	2005 UJ_{375}	—	October 27, 2005	Kitt Peak	Spacewatch	·	1.4 km	MPC · JPL
681698	2005 UB_{379}	—	October 22, 2005	Kitt Peak	Spacewatch	·	1.3 km	MPC · JPL
681699	2005 UG_{392}	—	October 30, 2005	Kitt Peak	Spacewatch	·	1.9 km	MPC · JPL
681700	2005 UQ_{404}	—	October 29, 2005	Mount Lemmon	Mount Lemmon Survey	·	1.3 km	MPC · JPL

== 681701–681800 ==
back to top

Designation			Discovery			Properties		Ref
Permanent	Provisional	Named after	Date	Site	Discoverer(s)	Category	Diam.	Ref
681701	2005 UR_{405}	—	September 30, 2005	Mount Lemmon	Mount Lemmon Survey	·	660 m	MPC · JPL
681702	2005 UE_{406}	—	October 30, 2005	Kitt Peak	Spacewatch	KOR	1.1 km	MPC · JPL
681703	2005 UN_{406}	—	September 22, 2000	Kitt Peak	Spacewatch	·	2.0 km	MPC · JPL
681704	2005 UV_{411}	—	October 31, 2005	Mount Lemmon	Mount Lemmon Survey	·	450 m	MPC · JPL
681705	2005 UC_{412}	—	October 31, 2005	Mount Lemmon	Mount Lemmon Survey	·	2.1 km	MPC · JPL
681706	2005 UL_{423}	—	October 28, 2005	Kitt Peak	Spacewatch	·	1.7 km	MPC · JPL
681707	2005 UR_{426}	—	October 28, 2005	Kitt Peak	Spacewatch	·	2.7 km	MPC · JPL
681708	2005 UV_{428}	—	October 28, 2005	Kitt Peak	Spacewatch	·	2.3 km	MPC · JPL
681709	2005 UY_{430}	—	October 24, 2005	Kitt Peak	Spacewatch	·	470 m	MPC · JPL
681710	2005 UH_{432}	—	October 28, 2005	Kitt Peak	Spacewatch	·	2.4 km	MPC · JPL
681711	2005 UH_{434}	—	October 29, 2005	Mount Lemmon	Mount Lemmon Survey	·	1.2 km	MPC · JPL
681712	2005 UF_{436}	—	October 30, 2005	Kitt Peak	Spacewatch	·	1.8 km	MPC · JPL
681713	2005 UU_{442}	—	August 30, 2005	Palomar	NEAT	·	2.7 km	MPC · JPL
681714	2005 UD_{451}	—	October 27, 2005	Mount Lemmon	Mount Lemmon Survey	KOR	1.2 km	MPC · JPL
681715	2005 UM_{451}	—	October 28, 2005	Kitt Peak	Spacewatch	·	1.8 km	MPC · JPL
681716	2005 UV_{452}	—	October 29, 2005	Kitt Peak	Spacewatch	·	2.2 km	MPC · JPL
681717	2005 UK_{458}	—	October 30, 2005	Mount Lemmon	Mount Lemmon Survey	·	1.2 km	MPC · JPL
681718	2005 UX_{461}	—	October 30, 2005	Kitt Peak	Spacewatch	MAS	660 m	MPC · JPL
681719	2005 UF_{468}	—	October 30, 2005	Kitt Peak	Spacewatch	LIX	2.7 km	MPC · JPL
681720	2005 UG_{471}	—	October 30, 2005	Kitt Peak	Spacewatch	·	2.2 km	MPC · JPL
681721	2005 UN_{471}	—	October 30, 2005	Kitt Peak	Spacewatch	EUN	930 m	MPC · JPL
681722	2005 UP_{472}	—	October 26, 2005	Kitt Peak	Spacewatch	·	590 m	MPC · JPL
681723	2005 UL_{477}	—	October 26, 2005	Kitt Peak	Spacewatch	AGN	1.1 km	MPC · JPL
681724	2005 UY_{499}	—	October 27, 2005	Palomar	NEAT	·	590 m	MPC · JPL
681725	2005 UL_{518}	—	October 25, 2005	Apache Point	SDSS Collaboration	·	2.0 km	MPC · JPL
681726	2005 UK_{520}	—	October 1, 2005	Apache Point	SDSS Collaboration	·	1.9 km	MPC · JPL
681727	2005 UT_{529}	—	October 30, 2005	Kitt Peak	Spacewatch	·	1.7 km	MPC · JPL
681728	2005 UW_{532}	—	October 27, 2005	Kitt Peak	Spacewatch	KOR	1.2 km	MPC · JPL
681729	2005 UF_{535}	—	October 22, 2005	Kitt Peak	Spacewatch	·	730 m	MPC · JPL
681730	2005 UC_{537}	—	October 24, 2009	Kitt Peak	Spacewatch	·	670 m	MPC · JPL
681731	2005 UF_{537}	—	October 26, 2005	Kitt Peak	Spacewatch	·	630 m	MPC · JPL
681732	2005 UR_{539}	—	April 28, 2008	Kitt Peak	Spacewatch	·	2.7 km	MPC · JPL
681733	2005 UE_{541}	—	December 23, 2017	Haleakala	Pan-STARRS 1	·	2.2 km	MPC · JPL
681734	2005 UK_{541}	—	October 24, 2005	Kitt Peak	Spacewatch	(5)	890 m	MPC · JPL
681735	2005 UQ_{542}	—	October 27, 2005	Mount Lemmon	Mount Lemmon Survey	·	490 m	MPC · JPL
681736	2005 UV_{542}	—	March 10, 2011	Mount Lemmon	Mount Lemmon Survey	·	1.1 km	MPC · JPL
681737	2005 UH_{543}	—	October 28, 2005	Mount Lemmon	Mount Lemmon Survey	KOR	1.0 km	MPC · JPL
681738	2005 UJ_{543}	—	October 28, 2005	Kitt Peak	Spacewatch	KOR	1.2 km	MPC · JPL
681739	2005 UH_{544}	—	October 24, 2005	Kitt Peak	Spacewatch	·	2.2 km	MPC · JPL
681740	2005 UJ_{545}	—	November 26, 2014	Haleakala	Pan-STARRS 1	·	990 m	MPC · JPL
681741	2005 UO_{546}	—	October 2, 2013	Haleakala	Pan-STARRS 1	·	780 m	MPC · JPL
681742	2005 UC_{548}	—	October 28, 2005	Kitt Peak	Spacewatch	·	2.3 km	MPC · JPL
681743	2005 UW_{552}	—	October 31, 2005	Mount Lemmon	Mount Lemmon Survey	·	2.4 km	MPC · JPL
681744	2005 UY_{552}	—	October 27, 2005	Kitt Peak	Spacewatch	·	1.1 km	MPC · JPL
681745	2005 UP_{553}	—	July 29, 2008	Kitt Peak	Spacewatch	·	380 m	MPC · JPL
681746	2005 UK_{554}	—	October 29, 2005	Mount Lemmon	Mount Lemmon Survey	·	1.8 km	MPC · JPL
681747	2005 UE_{555}	—	October 29, 2005	Mount Lemmon	Mount Lemmon Survey	EMA	2.4 km	MPC · JPL
681748	2005 UE_{556}	—	October 28, 2005	Kitt Peak	Spacewatch	·	2.1 km	MPC · JPL
681749	2005 UG_{556}	—	October 29, 2005	Kitt Peak	Spacewatch	·	2.1 km	MPC · JPL
681750	2005 UO_{557}	—	October 27, 2005	Kitt Peak	Spacewatch	·	2.4 km	MPC · JPL
681751	2005 VC_{13}	—	October 27, 2005	Kitt Peak	Spacewatch	·	1.3 km	MPC · JPL
681752	2005 VN_{20}	—	November 1, 2005	Kitt Peak	Spacewatch	EOS	1.6 km	MPC · JPL
681753	2005 VZ_{21}	—	November 1, 2005	Kitt Peak	Spacewatch	EOS	1.2 km	MPC · JPL
681754	2005 VD_{22}	—	November 1, 2005	Kitt Peak	Spacewatch	·	930 m	MPC · JPL
681755	2005 VD_{23}	—	November 1, 2005	Kitt Peak	Spacewatch	·	2.5 km	MPC · JPL
681756	2005 VZ_{23}	—	October 24, 2005	Kitt Peak	Spacewatch	EOS	1.5 km	MPC · JPL
681757	2005 VE_{38}	—	November 3, 2005	Mount Lemmon	Mount Lemmon Survey	·	2.4 km	MPC · JPL
681758	2005 VH_{44}	—	November 3, 2005	Mount Lemmon	Mount Lemmon Survey	·	2.4 km	MPC · JPL
681759	2005 VP_{51}	—	November 3, 2005	Mount Lemmon	Mount Lemmon Survey	·	1.8 km	MPC · JPL
681760	2005 VN_{53}	—	November 4, 2005	Kitt Peak	Spacewatch	·	940 m	MPC · JPL
681761	2005 VD_{55}	—	October 29, 2005	Kitt Peak	Spacewatch	HYG	2.0 km	MPC · JPL
681762	2005 VF_{56}	—	November 4, 2005	Kitt Peak	Spacewatch	·	1.8 km	MPC · JPL
681763	2005 VG_{80}	—	November 3, 2005	Mount Lemmon	Mount Lemmon Survey	·	2.2 km	MPC · JPL
681764	2005 VW_{83}	—	November 4, 2005	Kitt Peak	Spacewatch	MAR	970 m	MPC · JPL
681765	2005 VQ_{85}	—	November 4, 2005	Kitt Peak	Spacewatch	·	2.0 km	MPC · JPL
681766	2005 VS_{86}	—	November 5, 2005	Mount Lemmon	Mount Lemmon Survey	·	2.1 km	MPC · JPL
681767	2005 VC_{92}	—	October 29, 2005	Kitt Peak	Spacewatch	EOS	1.2 km	MPC · JPL
681768	2005 VF_{95}	—	November 6, 2005	Kitt Peak	Spacewatch	·	2.3 km	MPC · JPL
681769	2005 VY_{95}	—	November 6, 2005	Kitt Peak	Spacewatch	·	520 m	MPC · JPL
681770	2005 VU_{100}	—	October 24, 2005	Kitt Peak	Spacewatch	·	1.9 km	MPC · JPL
681771	2005 VK_{103}	—	October 23, 2005	Kitt Peak	Spacewatch	·	560 m	MPC · JPL
681772	2005 VP_{105}	—	October 23, 2005	Kitt Peak	Spacewatch	·	2.0 km	MPC · JPL
681773	2005 VV_{105}	—	October 29, 2005	Kitt Peak	Spacewatch	·	1.0 km	MPC · JPL
681774	2005 VE_{106}	—	November 3, 2005	Mount Lemmon	Mount Lemmon Survey	·	1.9 km	MPC · JPL
681775	2005 VK_{109}	—	November 6, 2005	Mount Lemmon	Mount Lemmon Survey	MAS	630 m	MPC · JPL
681776	2005 VV_{126}	—	October 28, 2005	Apache Point	SDSS Collaboration	·	870 m	MPC · JPL
681777	2005 VT_{127}	—	December 1, 2005	Apache Point	SDSS Collaboration	·	450 m	MPC · JPL
681778	2005 VY_{131}	—	October 27, 2005	Apache Point	SDSS Collaboration	VER	1.9 km	MPC · JPL
681779	2005 VB_{133}	—	October 25, 2005	Apache Point	SDSS Collaboration	EMA	2.0 km	MPC · JPL
681780	2005 VC_{134}	—	October 30, 2005	Apache Point	SDSS Collaboration	·	2.2 km	MPC · JPL
681781	2005 VN_{138}	—	November 4, 2005	Mount Lemmon	Mount Lemmon Survey	·	2.5 km	MPC · JPL
681782	2005 VD_{140}	—	November 3, 2011	Kitt Peak	Spacewatch	·	1.7 km	MPC · JPL
681783	2005 VE_{140}	—	November 5, 2005	Kitt Peak	Spacewatch	·	700 m	MPC · JPL
681784	2005 VJ_{140}	—	November 10, 2005	Kitt Peak	Spacewatch	·	1.5 km	MPC · JPL
681785	2005 VM_{140}	—	May 11, 2008	Kitt Peak	Spacewatch	·	2.4 km	MPC · JPL
681786	2005 VC_{141}	—	July 25, 2015	Haleakala	Pan-STARRS 1	·	2.7 km	MPC · JPL
681787	2005 VG_{142}	—	April 7, 2013	Mount Lemmon	Mount Lemmon Survey	·	1.9 km	MPC · JPL
681788	2005 VN_{142}	—	November 1, 2005	Kitt Peak	Spacewatch	TIR	2.0 km	MPC · JPL
681789	2005 VM_{143}	—	November 4, 2005	Kitt Peak	Spacewatch	KOR	1.1 km	MPC · JPL
681790	2005 VW_{144}	—	April 30, 2014	Haleakala	Pan-STARRS 1	·	1.9 km	MPC · JPL
681791	2005 VE_{148}	—	January 12, 2018	Haleakala	Pan-STARRS 1	·	1.9 km	MPC · JPL
681792	2005 VF_{148}	—	July 19, 2015	Haleakala	Pan-STARRS 1	·	2.2 km	MPC · JPL
681793	2005 VY_{150}	—	November 5, 2005	Mount Lemmon	Mount Lemmon Survey	·	570 m	MPC · JPL
681794	2005 VS_{151}	—	November 6, 2005	Kitt Peak	Spacewatch	·	2.4 km	MPC · JPL
681795	2005 VC_{152}	—	October 7, 2016	Haleakala	Pan-STARRS 1	·	2.0 km	MPC · JPL
681796	2005 VU_{152}	—	November 1, 2005	Kitt Peak	Spacewatch	EOS	1.4 km	MPC · JPL
681797	2005 VZ_{152}	—	November 12, 2005	Kitt Peak	Spacewatch	·	2.5 km	MPC · JPL
681798	2005 VL_{155}	—	November 10, 2005	Kitt Peak	Spacewatch	·	2.3 km	MPC · JPL
681799	2005 VR_{155}	—	November 3, 2005	Mount Lemmon	Mount Lemmon Survey	·	1.9 km	MPC · JPL
681800	2005 VB_{156}	—	November 4, 2005	Kitt Peak	Spacewatch	·	1.8 km	MPC · JPL

== 681801–681900 ==
back to top

Designation			Discovery			Properties		Ref
Permanent	Provisional	Named after	Date	Site	Discoverer(s)	Category	Diam.	Ref
681801	2005 VC_{156}	—	November 6, 2005	Kitt Peak	Spacewatch	·	2.1 km	MPC · JPL
681802	2005 VD_{156}	—	November 7, 2005	Mauna Kea	A. Boattini	·	2.2 km	MPC · JPL
681803	2005 VH_{157}	—	November 5, 2005	Kitt Peak	Spacewatch	·	1.0 km	MPC · JPL
681804	2005 VM_{157}	—	November 6, 2005	Kitt Peak	Spacewatch	·	940 m	MPC · JPL
681805	2005 WH_{7}	—	November 21, 2005	Kitt Peak	Spacewatch	·	1.8 km	MPC · JPL
681806	2005 WA_{11}	—	November 22, 2005	Kitt Peak	Spacewatch	CLA	1.5 km	MPC · JPL
681807	2005 WS_{12}	—	November 22, 2005	Kitt Peak	Spacewatch	·	1.5 km	MPC · JPL
681808	2005 WY_{12}	—	October 25, 2005	Mount Lemmon	Mount Lemmon Survey	EOS	1.5 km	MPC · JPL
681809	2005 WL_{22}	—	November 12, 2005	Kitt Peak	Spacewatch	EOS	1.3 km	MPC · JPL
681810	2005 WY_{24}	—	November 21, 2005	Kitt Peak	Spacewatch	LIX	2.6 km	MPC · JPL
681811	2005 WJ_{27}	—	November 21, 2005	Kitt Peak	Spacewatch	·	1.7 km	MPC · JPL
681812	2005 WS_{27}	—	October 25, 2005	Mount Lemmon	Mount Lemmon Survey	·	1.9 km	MPC · JPL
681813	2005 WL_{42}	—	November 21, 2005	Kitt Peak	Spacewatch	·	1.1 km	MPC · JPL
681814	2005 WD_{48}	—	November 25, 2005	Kitt Peak	Spacewatch	(5)	900 m	MPC · JPL
681815	2005 WF_{49}	—	November 25, 2005	Kitt Peak	Spacewatch	·	2.2 km	MPC · JPL
681816	2005 WU_{49}	—	November 25, 2005	Mount Lemmon	Mount Lemmon Survey	·	550 m	MPC · JPL
681817	2005 WH_{52}	—	November 25, 2005	Mount Lemmon	Mount Lemmon Survey	·	970 m	MPC · JPL
681818	2005 WV_{54}	—	November 25, 2005	Kitt Peak	Spacewatch	·	2.5 km	MPC · JPL
681819 Shriekback	2005 WF_{59}	Shriekback	November 20, 2005	Nogales	J.-C. Merlin	HNS	720 m	MPC · JPL
681820	2005 WJ_{66}	—	November 4, 2005	Kitt Peak	Spacewatch	URS	2.7 km	MPC · JPL
681821	2005 WR_{68}	—	November 25, 2005	Mount Lemmon	Mount Lemmon Survey	·	2.3 km	MPC · JPL
681822	2005 WZ_{76}	—	November 25, 2005	Kitt Peak	Spacewatch	·	1.1 km	MPC · JPL
681823	2005 WC_{102}	—	November 29, 2005	Socorro	LINEAR	TIR	2.9 km	MPC · JPL
681824	2005 WF_{102}	—	November 29, 2005	Socorro	LINEAR	·	730 m	MPC · JPL
681825	2005 WM_{113}	—	November 26, 2005	Kitt Peak	Spacewatch	·	1.6 km	MPC · JPL
681826	2005 WA_{115}	—	November 28, 2005	Mount Lemmon	Mount Lemmon Survey	·	2.3 km	MPC · JPL
681827	2005 WM_{123}	—	September 29, 2005	Mount Lemmon	Mount Lemmon Survey	·	2.3 km	MPC · JPL
681828	2005 WY_{124}	—	November 25, 2005	Kitt Peak	Spacewatch	·	2.3 km	MPC · JPL
681829	2005 WW_{129}	—	November 25, 2005	Mount Lemmon	Mount Lemmon Survey	·	490 m	MPC · JPL
681830	2005 WS_{130}	—	November 25, 2005	Mount Lemmon	Mount Lemmon Survey	·	870 m	MPC · JPL
681831	2005 WV_{136}	—	October 29, 2005	Kitt Peak	Spacewatch	·	1.6 km	MPC · JPL
681832	2005 WW_{136}	—	November 5, 2005	Kitt Peak	Spacewatch	·	860 m	MPC · JPL
681833	2005 WQ_{137}	—	November 26, 2005	Mount Lemmon	Mount Lemmon Survey	·	1.2 km	MPC · JPL
681834	2005 WD_{140}	—	November 26, 2005	Mount Lemmon	Mount Lemmon Survey	·	2.3 km	MPC · JPL
681835	2005 WV_{147}	—	November 25, 2005	Kitt Peak	Spacewatch	·	1.1 km	MPC · JPL
681836	2005 WE_{160}	—	November 30, 2005	Mount Lemmon	Mount Lemmon Survey	·	1.9 km	MPC · JPL
681837	2005 WY_{163}	—	November 29, 2005	Kitt Peak	Spacewatch	EUP	2.4 km	MPC · JPL
681838	2005 WS_{176}	—	November 30, 2005	Kitt Peak	Spacewatch	·	1.9 km	MPC · JPL
681839	2005 WZ_{183}	—	November 28, 2005	Palomar	NEAT	PHO	780 m	MPC · JPL
681840	2005 WX_{186}	—	November 29, 2005	Kitt Peak	Spacewatch	·	2.1 km	MPC · JPL
681841	2005 WE_{188}	—	November 30, 2005	Kitt Peak	Spacewatch	·	2.2 km	MPC · JPL
681842	2005 WV_{198}	—	November 25, 2005	Kitt Peak	Spacewatch	·	1 km	MPC · JPL
681843	2005 WF_{201}	—	November 28, 2005	Kitt Peak	Spacewatch	·	1.4 km	MPC · JPL
681844	2005 WN_{202}	—	November 30, 2005	Kitt Peak	Spacewatch	EOS	1.7 km	MPC · JPL
681845	2005 WR_{212}	—	November 30, 2005	Mount Lemmon	Mount Lemmon Survey	·	2.8 km	MPC · JPL
681846	2005 WQ_{213}	—	November 29, 2005	Kitt Peak	Spacewatch	·	680 m	MPC · JPL
681847	2005 WK_{214}	—	November 24, 2005	Palomar	NEAT	·	1.3 km	MPC · JPL
681848	2005 WZ_{215}	—	August 12, 2015	Haleakala	Pan-STARRS 1	·	2.2 km	MPC · JPL
681849	2005 WF_{216}	—	November 25, 2005	Kitt Peak	Spacewatch	·	590 m	MPC · JPL
681850	2005 WS_{216}	—	November 30, 2005	Mount Lemmon	Mount Lemmon Survey	·	2.1 km	MPC · JPL
681851	2005 WE_{217}	—	November 26, 2005	Mount Lemmon	Mount Lemmon Survey	NYS	930 m	MPC · JPL
681852	2005 WO_{217}	—	November 22, 2005	Kitt Peak	Spacewatch	·	2.2 km	MPC · JPL
681853	2005 WR_{217}	—	November 25, 2005	Kitt Peak	Spacewatch	·	1.7 km	MPC · JPL
681854	2005 WQ_{219}	—	November 29, 2005	Palomar	NEAT	·	2.2 km	MPC · JPL
681855	2005 WN_{220}	—	November 26, 2005	Kitt Peak	Spacewatch	·	2.5 km	MPC · JPL
681856	2005 XS_{6}	—	June 16, 2004	Kitt Peak	Spacewatch	·	1.1 km	MPC · JPL
681857	2005 XX_{10}	—	December 1, 2005	Kitt Peak	Spacewatch	EUN	930 m	MPC · JPL
681858	2005 XO_{15}	—	December 1, 2005	Mount Lemmon	Mount Lemmon Survey	·	2.1 km	MPC · JPL
681859	2005 XY_{15}	—	April 10, 2002	Kitt Peak	M. W. Buie, L. H. Wasserman	·	1.7 km	MPC · JPL
681860	2005 XF_{19}	—	December 2, 2005	Kitt Peak	Spacewatch	·	830 m	MPC · JPL
681861	2005 XV_{23}	—	November 22, 2005	Kitt Peak	Spacewatch	·	2.5 km	MPC · JPL
681862	2005 XL_{30}	—	December 1, 2005	Kitt Peak	Spacewatch	·	630 m	MPC · JPL
681863	2005 XR_{35}	—	December 4, 2005	Mount Lemmon	Mount Lemmon Survey	GEF	1.3 km	MPC · JPL
681864	2005 XW_{36}	—	December 4, 2005	Kitt Peak	Spacewatch	·	2.3 km	MPC · JPL
681865	2005 XX_{36}	—	December 4, 2005	Kitt Peak	Spacewatch	(5)	1.2 km	MPC · JPL
681866	2005 XQ_{48}	—	December 2, 2005	Mount Lemmon	Mount Lemmon Survey	·	2.2 km	MPC · JPL
681867	2005 XL_{53}	—	November 3, 2005	Kitt Peak	Spacewatch	MAR	1.2 km	MPC · JPL
681868	2005 XF_{58}	—	December 2, 2005	Mount Lemmon	Mount Lemmon Survey	·	1.4 km	MPC · JPL
681869	2005 XT_{70}	—	December 6, 2005	Kitt Peak	Spacewatch	·	1.2 km	MPC · JPL
681870	2005 XD_{72}	—	December 6, 2005	Kitt Peak	Spacewatch	MAR	880 m	MPC · JPL
681871	2005 XR_{78}	—	December 2, 2005	Socorro	LINEAR	·	610 m	MPC · JPL
681872	2005 XU_{80}	—	December 5, 2005	Kitt Peak	Spacewatch	·	510 m	MPC · JPL
681873	2005 XJ_{81}	—	December 7, 2005	Kitt Peak	Spacewatch	·	2.4 km	MPC · JPL
681874	2005 XC_{93}	—	August 30, 2005	Kitt Peak	Spacewatch	·	1.9 km	MPC · JPL
681875	2005 XL_{95}	—	October 5, 2005	Kitt Peak	Spacewatch	(5)	850 m	MPC · JPL
681876	2005 XF_{98}	—	December 1, 2005	Kitt Peak	Wasserman, L. H., Millis, R. L.	3:2 · SHU	3.9 km	MPC · JPL
681877	2005 XC_{102}	—	December 1, 2005	Kitt Peak	Wasserman, L. H., Millis, R. L.	·	1.2 km	MPC · JPL
681878	2005 XH_{108}	—	December 1, 2005	Kitt Peak	Wasserman, L. H., Millis, R. L.	·	1.1 km	MPC · JPL
681879	2005 XO_{109}	—	December 4, 2005	Mount Lemmon	Mount Lemmon Survey	HOF	2.3 km	MPC · JPL
681880	2005 XQ_{119}	—	November 28, 2013	Mount Lemmon	Mount Lemmon Survey	3:2	3.8 km	MPC · JPL
681881	2005 XT_{121}	—	May 3, 2008	Kitt Peak	Spacewatch	·	1.5 km	MPC · JPL
681882	2005 XY_{121}	—	May 12, 2013	Mayhill-ISON	L. Elenin	EUP	2.6 km	MPC · JPL
681883	2005 XG_{122}	—	September 29, 2008	Catalina	CSS	·	1.1 km	MPC · JPL
681884	2005 XE_{123}	—	January 4, 2012	Mount Lemmon	Mount Lemmon Survey	·	2.5 km	MPC · JPL
681885	2005 XR_{123}	—	November 28, 2013	Mount Lemmon	Mount Lemmon Survey	·	1.1 km	MPC · JPL
681886	2005 XV_{123}	—	November 9, 2009	Mount Lemmon	Mount Lemmon Survey	MAR	780 m	MPC · JPL
681887	2005 XW_{123}	—	October 24, 2009	Kitt Peak	Spacewatch	·	1.2 km	MPC · JPL
681888	2005 XH_{124}	—	September 25, 2016	Haleakala	Pan-STARRS 1	·	2.5 km	MPC · JPL
681889	2005 XR_{125}	—	September 15, 2009	Kitt Peak	Spacewatch	·	1.2 km	MPC · JPL
681890	2005 XJ_{127}	—	January 14, 2015	Haleakala	Pan-STARRS 1	·	1.4 km	MPC · JPL
681891	2005 XN_{127}	—	December 4, 2005	Kitt Peak	Spacewatch	·	1.4 km	MPC · JPL
681892	2005 XP_{127}	—	March 28, 2015	Mount Lemmon	Mount Lemmon Survey	·	1.1 km	MPC · JPL
681893	2005 XZ_{127}	—	October 3, 2013	Kitt Peak	Spacewatch	·	1.1 km	MPC · JPL
681894	2005 XR_{128}	—	May 5, 2008	Kitt Peak	Spacewatch	·	2.1 km	MPC · JPL
681895	2005 XY_{128}	—	January 29, 2014	Kitt Peak	Spacewatch	V	590 m	MPC · JPL
681896	2005 XL_{129}	—	December 4, 2005	Kitt Peak	Spacewatch	·	930 m	MPC · JPL
681897	2005 XO_{129}	—	January 20, 2015	Haleakala	Pan-STARRS 1	·	1.2 km	MPC · JPL
681898	2005 XV_{129}	—	December 5, 2005	Kitt Peak	Spacewatch	·	990 m	MPC · JPL
681899	2005 XG_{130}	—	December 6, 2005	Kitt Peak	Spacewatch	·	2.0 km	MPC · JPL
681900	2005 XK_{131}	—	November 11, 2009	Kitt Peak	Spacewatch	·	1 km	MPC · JPL

== 681901–682000 ==
back to top

Designation			Discovery			Properties		Ref
Permanent	Provisional	Named after	Date	Site	Discoverer(s)	Category	Diam.	Ref
681901	2005 XC_{133}	—	December 10, 2005	Kitt Peak	Spacewatch	·	2.5 km	MPC · JPL
681902	2005 XP_{133}	—	December 7, 2005	Kitt Peak	Spacewatch	·	2.5 km	MPC · JPL
681903	2005 XU_{133}	—	December 4, 2005	Kitt Peak	Spacewatch	EOS	1.5 km	MPC · JPL
681904	2005 XL_{134}	—	December 6, 2005	Kitt Peak	Spacewatch	·	2.9 km	MPC · JPL
681905	2005 XW_{134}	—	December 8, 2005	Kitt Peak	Spacewatch	·	2.1 km	MPC · JPL
681906	2005 XX_{134}	—	December 6, 2005	Kitt Peak	Spacewatch	·	2.3 km	MPC · JPL
681907	2005 XL_{135}	—	December 10, 2005	Kitt Peak	Spacewatch	·	2.8 km	MPC · JPL
681908	2005 XP_{135}	—	December 1, 2005	Kitt Peak	Spacewatch	·	2.0 km	MPC · JPL
681909	2005 XQ_{135}	—	December 7, 2005	Kitt Peak	Spacewatch	·	2.2 km	MPC · JPL
681910	2005 XU_{135}	—	December 7, 2005	Kitt Peak	Spacewatch	·	2.1 km	MPC · JPL
681911	2005 XV_{136}	—	December 4, 2005	Kitt Peak	Spacewatch	·	2.2 km	MPC · JPL
681912	2005 YK_{12}	—	December 21, 2005	Kitt Peak	Spacewatch	·	2.3 km	MPC · JPL
681913	2005 YX_{12}	—	December 22, 2005	Kitt Peak	Spacewatch	THM	1.8 km	MPC · JPL
681914	2005 YJ_{13}	—	December 22, 2005	Kitt Peak	Spacewatch	·	2.2 km	MPC · JPL
681915	2005 YA_{32}	—	December 22, 2005	Kitt Peak	Spacewatch	ADE	1.4 km	MPC · JPL
681916	2005 YB_{51}	—	December 25, 2005	Mount Lemmon	Mount Lemmon Survey	THM	1.8 km	MPC · JPL
681917	2005 YE_{65}	—	December 25, 2005	Kitt Peak	Spacewatch	·	610 m	MPC · JPL
681918	2005 YZ_{65}	—	December 25, 2005	Kitt Peak	Spacewatch	·	1.1 km	MPC · JPL
681919	2005 YT_{87}	—	December 25, 2005	Mount Lemmon	Mount Lemmon Survey	·	1.1 km	MPC · JPL
681920	2005 YQ_{95}	—	December 25, 2005	Kitt Peak	Spacewatch	·	1.2 km	MPC · JPL
681921	2005 YT_{100}	—	December 24, 2005	Kitt Peak	Spacewatch	EUN	900 m	MPC · JPL
681922	2005 YU_{104}	—	November 30, 2005	Mount Lemmon	Mount Lemmon Survey	·	640 m	MPC · JPL
681923	2005 YX_{106}	—	December 25, 2005	Mount Lemmon	Mount Lemmon Survey	·	1.1 km	MPC · JPL
681924	2005 YH_{109}	—	December 25, 2005	Kitt Peak	Spacewatch	EMA	1.7 km	MPC · JPL
681925	2005 YF_{113}	—	December 25, 2005	Mount Lemmon	Mount Lemmon Survey	·	2.2 km	MPC · JPL
681926	2005 YE_{116}	—	December 25, 2005	Kitt Peak	Spacewatch	·	760 m	MPC · JPL
681927	2005 YC_{117}	—	December 25, 2005	Kitt Peak	Spacewatch	·	2.8 km	MPC · JPL
681928	2005 YW_{119}	—	December 27, 2005	Mount Lemmon	Mount Lemmon Survey	·	1.2 km	MPC · JPL
681929	2005 YW_{135}	—	December 26, 2005	Kitt Peak	Spacewatch	·	1.3 km	MPC · JPL
681930	2005 YZ_{136}	—	December 26, 2005	Mount Lemmon	Mount Lemmon Survey	H	340 m	MPC · JPL
681931	2005 YU_{137}	—	December 26, 2005	Kitt Peak	Spacewatch	LUT	2.8 km	MPC · JPL
681932	2005 YR_{138}	—	December 26, 2005	Kitt Peak	Spacewatch	EUN	1.2 km	MPC · JPL
681933	2005 YF_{150}	—	December 25, 2005	Kitt Peak	Spacewatch	NYS	640 m	MPC · JPL
681934	2005 YJ_{159}	—	December 27, 2005	Kitt Peak	Spacewatch	·	2.5 km	MPC · JPL
681935	2005 YB_{160}	—	October 19, 1999	Kitt Peak	Spacewatch	·	2.0 km	MPC · JPL
681936	2005 YC_{160}	—	December 27, 2005	Kitt Peak	Spacewatch	·	2.0 km	MPC · JPL
681937	2005 YB_{161}	—	October 27, 2005	Mount Lemmon	Mount Lemmon Survey	·	2.6 km	MPC · JPL
681938	2005 YD_{165}	—	December 30, 2005	Kitt Peak	Spacewatch	·	2.4 km	MPC · JPL
681939	2005 YL_{175}	—	December 22, 2005	Kitt Peak	Spacewatch	·	1.8 km	MPC · JPL
681940	2005 YC_{176}	—	December 22, 2005	Kitt Peak	Spacewatch	·	1.3 km	MPC · JPL
681941	2005 YA_{179}	—	November 30, 2005	Mount Lemmon	Mount Lemmon Survey	·	690 m	MPC · JPL
681942	2005 YQ_{192}	—	December 30, 2005	Kitt Peak	Spacewatch	·	1.4 km	MPC · JPL
681943	2005 YR_{194}	—	December 31, 2005	Kitt Peak	Spacewatch	·	2.0 km	MPC · JPL
681944	2005 YK_{195}	—	December 31, 2005	Kitt Peak	Spacewatch	ADE	1.7 km	MPC · JPL
681945	2005 YW_{197}	—	September 20, 2001	Apache Point	SDSS Collaboration	·	700 m	MPC · JPL
681946	2005 YN_{198}	—	December 25, 2005	Kitt Peak	Spacewatch	EOS	1.5 km	MPC · JPL
681947	2005 YG_{199}	—	December 7, 2005	Kitt Peak	Spacewatch	·	2.6 km	MPC · JPL
681948	2005 YH_{207}	—	March 23, 2003	Apache Point	SDSS Collaboration	·	800 m	MPC · JPL
681949	2005 YK_{207}	—	December 28, 2005	Mount Lemmon	Mount Lemmon Survey	·	1.5 km	MPC · JPL
681950	2005 YY_{216}	—	December 30, 2005	Kitt Peak	Spacewatch	·	2.6 km	MPC · JPL
681951	2005 YY_{217}	—	December 7, 2005	Kitt Peak	Spacewatch	·	1.1 km	MPC · JPL
681952	2005 YU_{218}	—	December 30, 2005	Mount Lemmon	Mount Lemmon Survey	·	1.1 km	MPC · JPL
681953	2005 YK_{223}	—	December 24, 2005	Kitt Peak	Spacewatch	·	850 m	MPC · JPL
681954	2005 YU_{223}	—	December 24, 2005	Kitt Peak	Spacewatch	·	1.3 km	MPC · JPL
681955	2005 YO_{225}	—	November 28, 2005	Mount Lemmon	Mount Lemmon Survey	·	1.0 km	MPC · JPL
681956	2005 YJ_{226}	—	December 25, 2005	Kitt Peak	Spacewatch	HOF	1.8 km	MPC · JPL
681957	2005 YZ_{233}	—	December 28, 2005	Kitt Peak	Spacewatch	KOR	1.3 km	MPC · JPL
681958	2005 YH_{236}	—	December 28, 2005	Kitt Peak	Spacewatch	·	2.6 km	MPC · JPL
681959	2005 YT_{239}	—	December 29, 2005	Kitt Peak	Spacewatch	·	2.4 km	MPC · JPL
681960	2005 YQ_{244}	—	December 30, 2005	Kitt Peak	Spacewatch	·	1.8 km	MPC · JPL
681961	2005 YA_{254}	—	December 29, 2005	Kitt Peak	Spacewatch	·	2.1 km	MPC · JPL
681962	2005 YY_{255}	—	December 30, 2005	Kitt Peak	Spacewatch	·	2.4 km	MPC · JPL
681963	2005 YQ_{257}	—	December 31, 2005	Kitt Peak	Spacewatch	·	1.5 km	MPC · JPL
681964	2005 YU_{258}	—	December 24, 2005	Kitt Peak	Spacewatch	·	1.0 km	MPC · JPL
681965	2005 YA_{264}	—	December 25, 2005	Kitt Peak	Spacewatch	·	540 m	MPC · JPL
681966	2005 YF_{266}	—	December 27, 2005	Kitt Peak	Spacewatch	·	1.1 km	MPC · JPL
681967	2005 YD_{267}	—	December 22, 2005	Kitt Peak	Spacewatch	·	1.5 km	MPC · JPL
681968	2005 YV_{267}	—	December 25, 2005	Kitt Peak	Spacewatch	·	2.2 km	MPC · JPL
681969	2005 YS_{285}	—	June 30, 2013	Haleakala	Pan-STARRS 1	·	2.3 km	MPC · JPL
681970	2005 YL_{288}	—	December 29, 2005	Mount Lemmon	Mount Lemmon Survey	·	2.2 km	MPC · JPL
681971	2005 YV_{293}	—	November 25, 2005	Catalina	CSS	·	2.2 km	MPC · JPL
681972	2005 YM_{294}	—	November 6, 2013	Calar Alto-CASADO	Proffe, G., Hellmich, S.	(5)	1.0 km	MPC · JPL
681973	2005 YO_{294}	—	February 25, 2007	Kitt Peak	Spacewatch	KOR	1.4 km	MPC · JPL
681974	2005 YY_{294}	—	June 2, 2008	Mount Lemmon	Mount Lemmon Survey	·	2.6 km	MPC · JPL
681975	2005 YQ_{296}	—	July 13, 2013	Haleakala	Pan-STARRS 1	·	2.6 km	MPC · JPL
681976	2005 YU_{296}	—	April 2, 2011	Mount Lemmon	Mount Lemmon Survey	ADE	1.4 km	MPC · JPL
681977	2005 YO_{299}	—	December 25, 2005	Kitt Peak	Spacewatch	·	640 m	MPC · JPL
681978	2005 YS_{299}	—	August 18, 2017	Haleakala	Pan-STARRS 1	·	940 m	MPC · JPL
681979	2005 YY_{300}	—	December 27, 2005	Kitt Peak	Spacewatch	·	2.9 km	MPC · JPL
681980	2005 YA_{301}	—	December 25, 2005	Kitt Peak	Spacewatch	V	390 m	MPC · JPL
681981	2005 YQ_{302}	—	December 22, 2005	Kitt Peak	Spacewatch	KON	2.4 km	MPC · JPL
681982	2005 YV_{302}	—	December 25, 2005	Kitt Peak	Spacewatch	·	2.2 km	MPC · JPL
681983	2005 YZ_{302}	—	December 30, 2005	Kitt Peak	Spacewatch	·	920 m	MPC · JPL
681984	2006 AU_{8}	—	January 2, 2006	Mount Lemmon	Mount Lemmon Survey	·	610 m	MPC · JPL
681985	2006 AA_{13}	—	December 25, 2005	Kitt Peak	Spacewatch	·	1.5 km	MPC · JPL
681986	2006 AT_{13}	—	January 5, 2006	Mount Lemmon	Mount Lemmon Survey	H	370 m	MPC · JPL
681987	2006 AU_{13}	—	January 5, 2006	Mount Lemmon	Mount Lemmon Survey	·	1.8 km	MPC · JPL
681988	2006 AZ_{14}	—	January 5, 2006	Mount Lemmon	Mount Lemmon Survey	·	2.8 km	MPC · JPL
681989	2006 AX_{17}	—	December 24, 2005	Kitt Peak	Spacewatch	·	2.4 km	MPC · JPL
681990	2006 AC_{25}	—	December 28, 2005	Mount Lemmon	Mount Lemmon Survey	·	610 m	MPC · JPL
681991	2006 AS_{26}	—	January 5, 2006	Kitt Peak	Spacewatch	KOR	1.2 km	MPC · JPL
681992	2006 AB_{36}	—	January 4, 2006	Mount Lemmon	Mount Lemmon Survey	·	2.5 km	MPC · JPL
681993	2006 AQ_{46}	—	December 26, 2005	Mount Lemmon	Mount Lemmon Survey	·	2.7 km	MPC · JPL
681994	2006 AM_{53}	—	January 5, 2006	Kitt Peak	Spacewatch	PHO	740 m	MPC · JPL
681995	2006 AY_{59}	—	December 28, 2005	Kitt Peak	Spacewatch	KOR	1.4 km	MPC · JPL
681996	2006 AG_{63}	—	December 28, 2005	Mount Lemmon	Mount Lemmon Survey	·	640 m	MPC · JPL
681997	2006 AC_{64}	—	December 30, 2005	Kitt Peak	Spacewatch	·	1.5 km	MPC · JPL
681998	2006 AN_{64}	—	January 7, 2006	Mount Lemmon	Mount Lemmon Survey	·	2.1 km	MPC · JPL
681999	2006 AG_{65}	—	January 8, 2006	Kitt Peak	Spacewatch	·	2.2 km	MPC · JPL
682000	2006 AM_{76}	—	September 11, 2004	Kitt Peak	Spacewatch	·	940 m	MPC · JPL

back to top

== Meaning of names ==
As minor planet discoveries are confirmed, they are given a permanent number by the IAU's Minor Planet Center (MPC), and the discoverers can then submit names for them, following the IAU's naming conventions. The list below concerns those minor planets in the specified number-range that have received names, and explains the meanings of those names.

Official naming citations of newly named small Solar System bodies are approved and published in a bulletin by IAU's Working Group for Small Bodies Nomenclature (WGSBN). Before May 2021, citations were published in MPC's Minor Planet Circulars for many decades. Recent citations can also be found on the JPL Small-Body Database (SBDB). Until his death in 2016, German astronomer Lutz D. Schmadel compiled these citations into the Dictionary of Minor Planet Names (DMP) and regularly updated the collection.

Based on Paul Herget's The Names of the Minor Planets, Schmadel also researched the unclear origin of numerous asteroids, most of which had been named prior to World War II. This article incorporates text from this source, which is in the public domain: SBDB New namings may only be added to this list below after official publication as the preannouncement of names is condemned. The WGSBN publishes a comprehensive guideline for the naming rules of non-cometary small Solar System bodies.

Named minor planet	Provisional	This minor planet was named for...	Ref · Catalog
681819 Shriekback	2005 WF_{59}	Shriekback is an English rock band formed in 1981 in Kentish Town by Barry Andrews, Dave Allen and Carl Marsh.	IAU · 681819
