= Dream All Day: The Best of the Posies =

Greatest hits album by The Posies
- Released: 21 March 2000
- Recorded: 1990–1996
- Genre: Alternative rock, pop rock, power pop
- Label: DGC Records
- Producer: Mike Ragogna, Nick Launay, Don Fleming and John Leckie

The Posies chronology
Success (1998)	Dream All Day: The Best of the Posies (2000)	Alive Before the Iceberg (2000)

Professional ratings
Review scores
Source	Rating
Allmusic	link
Pitchfork Media	(7.4/10) link

Dream All Day: The Best of the Posies is a compilation album by Seattle alternative rock band The Posies, released in 2000. This album was compiled with Ken Stringfellow and Jon Auer's full participation, but only collected songs from their successful and influential years on the Geffen and DGC labels.

== Track listing ==
No.	Title	Original album	Length
1.	"My Big Mouth"	Dear 23	2:27
2.	"Golden Blunders"	Dear 23	4:28
3.	"Any Other Way"	Dear 23	4:08
4.	"Suddenly Mary"	Dear 23	4:13
5.	"Spite and Malice"	"Suddenly Mary" B-side	2:59
6.	"I am the Cosmos" (Chris Bell cover)	"Feel/I am the Cosmos" EP	4:14
7.	"King Midas In Reverse" (The Hollies cover)	Sing Hollies in Reverse	5:29
8.	"Dream All Day"	Frosting on the Beater	3:05
9.	"Solar Sister"	Frosting on the Beater	3:20
10.	"Flavor of the Month"	Frosting on the Beater	2:36
11.	"Definite Door"	Frosting on the Beater	4:04
12.	"Coming Right Along"	Frosting on the Beater	6:20
13.	"Going, Going, Gone"	Reality Bites Soundtrack	3:32
14.	"Ontario"	Amazing Disgrace	2:39
15.	"Throwaway"	Amazing Disgrace	3:53
16.	"Please Return it"	Amazing Disgrace	3:30
17.	"Sad to be Aware"	"Please Return It" B-side	4:15
18.	"Everybody is a Fucking Liar"	Amazing Disgrace	3:15
19.	"Flood of Sunshine"	Dear 23	8:22
Total length:			69:03

== Personnel ==
- Jon Auer - Lead vocals and guitar
- Ken Stringfellow - Lead vocals, guitar and keyboards
- Arthur "Rick" Roberts - Bass
- Dave Fox - Bass
- Joe Skyward - Bass
- Mike Musburger - Drums
- Brian Young - Drums
