= Solar Sister =

Single by The Posies

from the album Frosting on the Beater
- Released: 1993
- Recorded: 1993
- Genre: Alternative rock
- Length: 3:20
- Label: DGC
- Songwriters: Ken Stringfellow and Jon Auer
- Producer: Don Fleming

The Posies singles chronology
"Dream All Day" (1993)	"Solar Sister" (1993)

"Solar Sister" is a song by the American alternative rock band The Posies, released as the second single released from its album Frosting on the Beater in 1993.

== Lyrics ==
The song mentions the book Sister Carrie by American novelist Theodore Dreiser.

== Track listing ==
1. "Solar Sister"
2. "Ever Since I Was Alone" (demo version)
3. "Start a Life"

== Notes ==
"Ever Since I Was Alone" is from the "Dream All Day" single and "Start a Life" is from the UK "Flavor of the Month" single.
