= Golden Blunders =

Single by the Posies

from the album Dear 23
- Released: 1990
- Recorded: 1990
- Genre: Alternative rock
- Length: 4:28
- Label: DGC
- Songwriters: Ken Stringfellow and Jon Auer
- Producer: John Leckie

The Posies singles chronology
"Golden Blunders" (1990)	"Suddenly Mary" (1991)

"Golden Blunders" is a song by the American alternative rock band the Posies, released as the first single released from its major label debut album Dear 23 in 1990.

== History ==
A Japanese single of this is known to exist and features three versions of 'Golden Blunders': lp version, radio edit and an acoustic version. The cover has the distorted pictures of the band from inside the Dear 23 album.

== Covers ==
Ringo Starr covered the song for his 1992 album, Time Takes Time.

== Track listing ==
1. "Golden Blunders"

== Chart positions ==
Chart (1990)	Peak position
US Alternative Airplay (Billboard)	17
