= Definite Door =

Single by The Posies

from the album Frosting on the Beater
- Released: 1994
- Recorded: 1993
- Genre: Alternative rock
- Length: 4:12
- Label: DGC
- Songwriter(s): Ken Stringfellow and Jon Auer
- Producer(s): Don Fleming

"Definite Door" is a song by the American alternative rock band The Posies, released as the final single released from its album Frosting on the Beater in 1994.

It was the only Posies release to make the UK Singles Chart, entering at number 67 for one week. The single was supported by an appearance on The Word, a late night television programme in the UK.

== Track listing ==
1. "Definite Door"
2. "Song of the Baker"
3. "Ooh Child"
4. "I Am the Cosmos" (Chris Bell)
