= Don't Eat the Dirt... =

EP by Sky Cries Mary
- Released: 1990
- Recorded: Nor-Sound Studio, Bellingham, Washington
- Genre: Industrial, psychedelic rock
- Length: 26:04
- Label: Lively Art

Sky Cries Mary chronology
Until the Grinders Cease (1989)	Don't Eat the Dirt... (1990)	Exit at the Axis (1992)

Don't Eat the Dirt... is an EP by Sky Cries Mary, released in 1990 through Lively Art.

== Track listing ==
All tracks are written by Sky Cries Mary, except "Spanish Castle Magic" by Jimi Hendrix.

No.	Title	Length
1.	"Hellbound for Heaven"	7:12
2.	"Spanish Castle Magic"	2:32
3.	"When the Fear Stops" (Hypno-Fisk-Mix by Steve Fisk)	5:29
4.	"Tongues"	5:02
5.	"The Drag"	5:49

== Personnel ==
Musicians

- Jon Auer – drums, piano, engineering and mixing on "Spanish Castle Magic"
- Alfred Butler – bass guitar on "Hellbound for Heaven" and "Tongues"
- Scott Mercado – drums on "Hellbound for Heaven" and "Tongues"
- Roderick Wolgamott Romero – vocals
- Stephan Byron-Salit – guitar on "Hellbound for Heaven" and "Tongues"
- Ken Stringfellow – bass guitar on "Spanish Castle Magic" and

Production and additional personnel

- Steve Fisk – engineering and mixing on "Hellbound for Heaven" and "Tongues"
- Pascal Magnier – engineering, mixing
