= Oslo (disambiguation) =

Oslo is the capital of Norway.

Oslo may also refer to:

== Geography ==
- Gamlebyen in Oslo, Norway, was known as Oslo until 1925
- Oslo, Minnesota, a small city in northwest Minnesota, United States
- Oslo, Dodge County, Minnesota, an unincorporated community in southeast Minnesota, United States
- Oslo, Florida, an unincorporated community in Florida, United States
- Oslo (Hackney), an East London kitchen-bar-venue based in Hackney
- Oslo Beach, a seaside village on the South Coast of KwaZulu-Natal, South Africa
- Solo, Indonesia

== Music ==
- oslo., a British post-punk band
- Oslo (band), a Californian rock band
- Oslo (duo), runners-up in French Popstars in 2013, made up of Eugénie and Vincent
- "Oslo", a song by the Disciples from Smoking Kills (album)
- "Oslo", a song by Tumi and the Volume from Tumi and the Volume (album)
- "Oslo", a song by Blonde Redhead from their 2010 album Penny Sparkle

== Other uses ==
- Oslo (play), a 2016 play by playwright J.T.Rogers
- Oslo (film), a 2021 film adaptation of the play
- HNoMS Oslo, several Norwegian Navy ships
- Oslo, a character in the French show Skyland
- Open Source and Linux Organization, a project by Hewlett-Packard
- Optics Software for Layout and Optimization

== See also ==
- Oslofjord, a fjord in the south-east of Norway
- Oslo class frigate, a class of ship design in the Royal Norwegian Navy
- The Oslo Accords between Israel and Palestinian representatives
- Oslo City (shopping center)
- Oslo Plads, a square in Copenhagen, Denmark
