= Jim Protector =

Norwegian band

- Origin: Horten, Oslo, Norway
- Genres: Indie rock Alternative rock Electronica; Power pop
- Years active: 2001–Present
- Labels: Switch Off Records
- Members: Alexander Svanberg; Jarle Nordaas; Stein Ove Eriksen; Andreas Solem Kjaer
- Past members: Sondre Graasvoll; Anders Lindvig; Ola Emil Moss; Mats Alnæs
- Website: Official Website

Jim Protector is a Norwegian alternative rock group. The band was formed in 2001 in Horten, Norway by primary songwriters Alexander Svanberg and Jarle Nordaas. They are best known for their radio hit "Jim Protector's guide to self-pity" (from their EP with the same name released in 2004).

== History ==
Jim Protector was formed in 2001 by primary songwriters Alex and Jarle, who released the 7-inch EP "Half Finished/Half Begun" in 2002. In 2004, Jim Protector released their second EP called "Jim Protectors guide to self-pity", engineered and produced by Thomas Ruud, from the Norwegian rock-act Mohammed.

Most members of Jim Protector are currently studying in Trondheim, Norway where an old storage room in a closed down smelting-plant serves as a studio and practice-arena. Jim Protector is now a fourpiece including the drummer Andreas and the guitar-player Stein Ove.

Jim Protector released their debut album "Shields Down" the summer of 2007, which includes a collaboration with lo-fi legend Jad Fair (Half Japanese, Teenage Fanclub, Yo La Tengo) and Ken Stringfellow from The Posies who has been mixing the album as well.

== Members ==
=== Current ===
- Alexander Svanberg - Bass, Vocals
- Jarle Nordaas - Guitar, Vocals
- Stein Ove Eriksen - Guitar, Synth (2004–Present)
- Andreas Solem Kjær - Drums (2004–Present)

=== Past ===
- Sondre Graasvoll - Guitar (2001–2004)
- Anders Lindvig - Drums (1992, 2001–2004)
- Ola Emil Moss - Guitar (2003)
- Mats Alnæs - Drums (2004)

== Discography ==
=== Albums/Box Sets ===
- Shields Down (Switch Off Records, 2007).

=== Singles/EPs ===
- Jim Protectors guide to self-pity (Switch Off Records, 2004).
- half finished / half begun (2002).

=== Compilation/Soundtrack contributions ===
- "Half Finished/Half Begun" on slagendagen 5 år (2002).
- "Waking Up With Me" and "Jim Protector's guide to self-pity" on Resolutt Julejazz vol. 5 (2004).
- "The Tunnel" and "The Hallmark Channel" on Resolutt Julejazz vol. 7 (2006).
