= Every Kind of Light =

Studio album by the Posies
- Released: June 28, 2005
- Recorded: February–August 2004
- Studio: The Soundhouse (Seattle)
- Genre: Rock
- Length: 49:38
- Label: Rykodisc
- Producer: Ineptunes

The Posies chronology
At Least, at Last (2000)	Every Kind of Light (2005)	Blood/Candy (2010)

Every Kind of Light is the sixth studio album by the Posies, released on June 28, 2005 by Rykodisc. This was the first full-length album release by the band since 1998's Success, after which they had disbanded. Starting in 2000, the band began performing numerous reunion shows, while principal songwriters Ken Stringfellow and Jon Auer pursued solo recordings and tours. This is the first Posies album to feature bassist/guitarist Matt Harris and drummer Darius Minwalla.

== Distribution ==
Every Kind of Light was available on iTunes three weeks prior to its announced release, and the album quickly hit the iTunes Most Popular list. Two songs from the album, "I Guess You're Right" and "Love Comes", were included as sample music in Microsoft's Windows Vista operating system.

== Reception ==
Professional ratings
Review scores
Source	Rating
AllMusic	link
Drowned in Sound	link
Pitchfork	(6.8/10) link
Spin	(7/10) link

Every Kind of Light received mixed to positive reviews. On the review aggregate site Metacritic, the album has a score of 66 out of 100, indicating "generally favorable reviews".

Peter Gaston of Spin wrote that "Even with a rather ho-hum second stanza, Every Kind of Light is an instant reminder that the '90s would have been a far worse place without the Posies, and that this decade is much better off with them around." Joe Tangari of Pitchfork called the album "...a decent record spiked with a few classic moments of patent posies pop ecstasy, even though the album fails to live up to The Posies previous works." In a mixed review, AllMusic's Mark Deming called the album "...a bit hollow," writing that "It's nice to have the Posies back in the studio again," but that "Every Kind of Light isn't the triumphant return fans might have hoped for."

== Track listing ==
All tracks are written by Jon Auer, Matt Harris, Darius Minwalla and Ken Stringfellow.

No.	Title	Length
1.	"It's Great to Be Here Again!"	3:58
2.	"Conversations"	4:44
3.	"All in a Day's Work"	4:20
4.	"I Guess You're Right"	3:32
5.	"Anything and Everything"	3:41
6.	"Second Time Around"	3:35
7.	"Last Crawl"	4:26
8.	"Could He Treat You Better?"	4:05
9.	"Love Comes"	3:19
10.	"I Finally Found a Jungle I Like!!!"	3:14
11.	"That Don't Fly"	4:38
12.	"Sweethearts of Rodeo Drive"	6:21

Japanese bonus track
No.	Title	Length
13.	"Open Me to the Way"

== Personnel ==
The Posies

- Jon Auer - lead vocals, guitars
- Ken Stringfellow - lead vocals, guitars, bass
- Matt Harris - bass, guitar
- Darius Minwalla - drums

Additional personnel

- Dan Marcus - trombone on "I Finally Found a Jungle I Like!!"
- Jay Thomas - trumpet on "Last Crawl" and "I Finally Found a Jungle I Like!!"

Production

- Ineptunes - production
- Kip Beelman - engineer
- Ed Brooks - mastering
- Rick Fisher - mastering
- Paul Grosso - art direction, design
