= Sky Cries Mary =

Rock band from Seattle

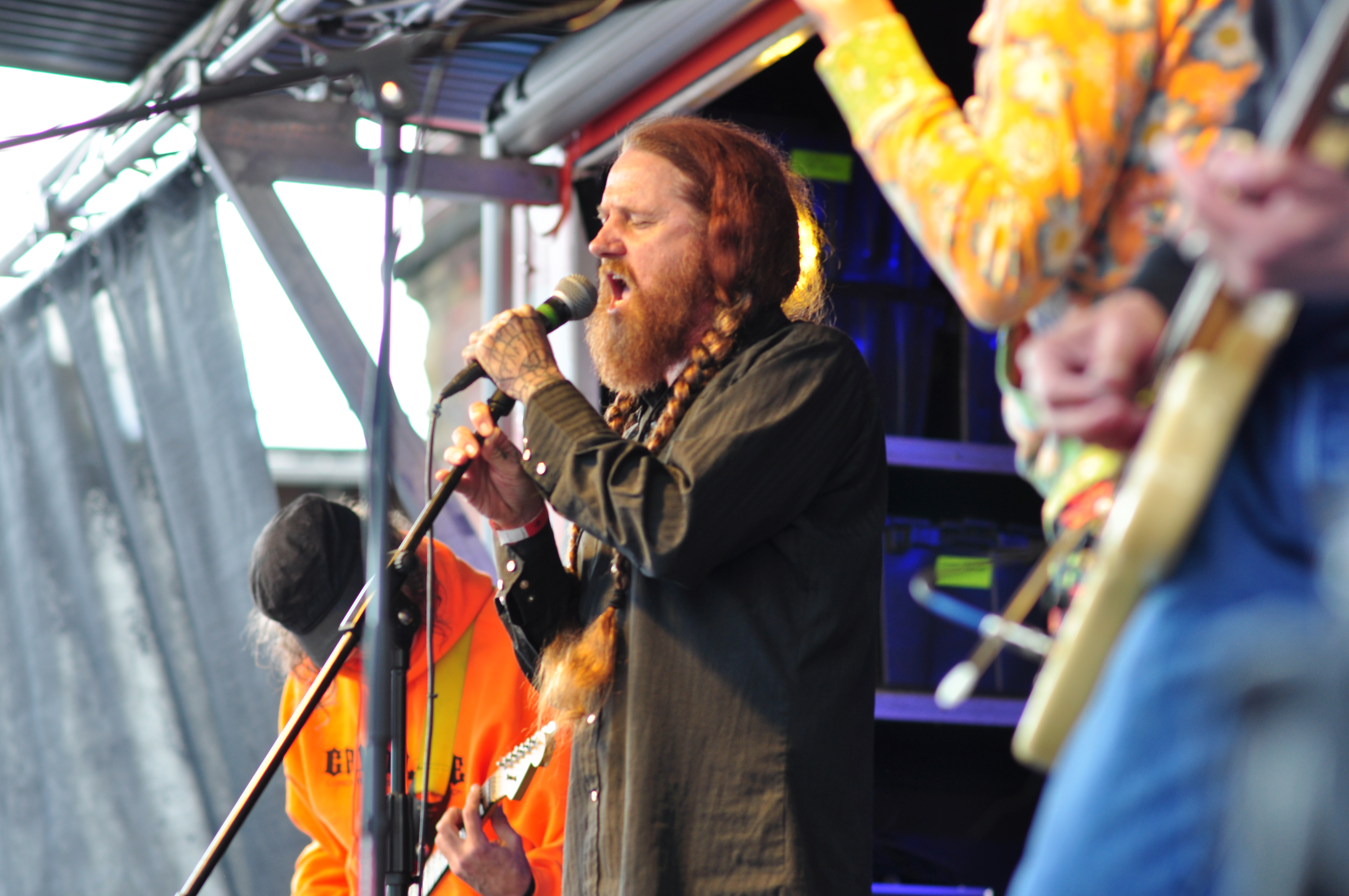
- Roderick Wolgamott, Sky Cries Mary, 2018

Background information
- Origin: Seattle, Washington, United States
- Genres: Psychedelic rock, trance, industrial, space rock
- Years active: 1988–99, 2004–2009, 2013–2015, 2016–present
- Labels: Lively Art/New Rose Records, World Domination Recordings/Capitol Records, Warner Bros. Records, Collective Fruit Records, Hoodooh Music, Trail Records
- Members: Rodrick Wolgamott; Ben Ireland; Kevin Whitworth; Jack Endino; Curt Eckman; Debra Reese
- Past members: Kurt Danielson; Ron Nine; Ivan Kral; Anisa Romero; Jon "Juano" Davison; Jon Auer; Ken Stringfellow; Scott Mercado; Alfred Butler; Stephen Brian-Salit; Mark Ultra; Kevin McCoy; Jeff Guess; DJ Fallout (Todd "TR" Robbins); Joe Skyward (Joseph E. Howard); Marc Olsen; Gordon Raphael; Jeff Greinke; Jeremy Moss; Michael Cozzi; William Bernhard; Anthony Alcantar; Kent Halvorsen

Sky Cries Mary is an American psychedelic rock/trance musical group from Seattle, Washington, formed in the late 1980s by Roderick Wolgamott.

Early band influences included European industrial music bands such as Einstürzende Neubauten, Coil, and Test Department, and 1970s glam/punk artists including Lou Reed, Iggy Pop, and David Bowie.

Notable band alumni include Jon Auer and Ken Stringfellow of The Posies, vocalist Anisa Romero, Michael Cozzi of Shriekback, Jon ‘Juano’ Davison (later of Yes and Glass Hammer), Ron Nine (Love Battery) on guitar, Kurt Danielson (TAD on bass) and Gordon Raphael (producer for The Strokes).

In 2018, guitarists Jack Endino and Kevin Whitworth, alongside bassist Curt Eckman and vocalist Debra Reese were invited to join the group. They have performed live several times in the Pacific Northwest, notably at Seattle Hempfest (2019). The most recent lineup recorded and released three studio albums on Trail Records: In 2021 "Wandering in the Vastness" was released digitally and on CD by Trail Records. A vinyl pressing followed in 2022. In 2022 Trail Records also released a vinyl pressing of "Secrets of a Red Planet". In 2023 the album "Everything Goes Somewhere" was released on vinyl featuring cover art by Scottish painter Fergus Hall, who has also created cover art for artists like King Crimson, he also created a "Tarot of the Witches" seen in the James Bond movie "Live and Let Die"

== History ==
The band's first album, from 1989, featured Roderick Wolgamott playing with Jon Auer and Ken Stringfellow from The Posies. The second album, released in 1990, featured the same trio, joined by Scott Mercado, Alfred Butler, Stephen Brian-Salit, Mark Ultra, Kevin McCoy and Jeff Guess. In 1991, the band became a septet with Roderick Wolgamott, Anisa Romero, DJ Fallout (a.k.a. Todd "TR" Robbins), Joseph E. Howard (a.k.a. Joe Skyward), Ben Ireland, Marc Olsen and Gordon Raphael. It was during this time they recorded A Return to the Inner Experience. Cozzi replaced Olsen on the fifth through seventh albums. In 1994, Davison replaced Joe Howard. William Bernhard joined the band in 1998 after Cozzi left to pursue other projects.

Sky Cries Mary had broken up in 1999, shortly after the release of Seeds, because band members wanted to work on other projects. They regrouped in various configurations including Hana, which featured Anisa Romero, Jeff Greinke, and Ben Ireland, and No Futuro, an experimental musical project helmed by Roderick Wolgamott, William Bernhard, and Jeremy Moss. In 2004, the band (composed of Wolgamott, Romero, Ireland, Davison, Cozzi and Bernhard) regrouped after they won the rights to their music back from their old record company and subsequently released their first live album Here and Now. Two years later they followed it up with the release of Small Town.

In 2008, Sky Cries Mary's founder, Roderick Wolgamott and Anisa Romero were featured along with Sting and Russell Simmons on Lokah's debut release, The Ivy Ceiling.

Sky Cries Mary were one of the first bands to have an 'internet only' concert, an effort that was directed by former member McCoy.

In 2012, bassist Jon Davison joined British progressive rock band Yes, performing as their lead vocalist. As a result, he was unavailable to rejoin the band when they reconvened in 2016.

In 2016, founder Roderick Wolgamott premiered a new line-up, alongside original drummer Ben Ireland, guitarist Ron Nine (Love Battery) and bassist Kurt Danielson (Tad).

In 2017, the band co-wrote and digitally released "War Song", a new single co-written by Wolgamott and Ron Nine. The band recorded several new songs, at Sound House with Jack Endino, who engineered Nirvana's Bleach, and Soundgarden's Badmotorfinger. Later in 2017, Jack Endino along with Curt Eckman (The Walkabouts), and Kevin Whitworth (Love Battery) joined the group. In September 2017, they headlined at Psychfest in Seattle. Together, the band recorded more songs, including re-releases of some very early Sky Cries Mary material.

A studio album, Thieves and Sirens, included songs from their most recent collaborations and was released digitally in 2017. A vinyl and CD release of Thieves and Sirens was issued in 2018 following live appearances in March and April.

On March 25, 2020, Secrets of a Red Planet was released on Trail Records. In January 2022, Wandering in the Vastness was released on Trail Records. In August 2023, Everything Goes Somewhere was released on Trail Records.

== Discography ==
- Until the Grinders Cease (1989) Lively Art/New Rose Records. (1999) World Domination Recordings
- Don't Eat the Dirt... (1990) Lively Art/New Rose Records
- Exit at the Axis (1992) World Domination Recordings/Capitol Records
- A Return to the Inner Experience (1993) World Domination Recordings/Capitol Records
- This Timeless Turning (1994) World Domination Recordings/Capitol Records
- Moonbathing on Sleeping Leaves (1997) Warner Bros. Records
- Fresh Fruits for the Liberation (1998) Warner Bros. Records
- Seeds (1999) Collective Fruit Records
- Here and Now (2005) Hoodooh Music
- Small Town (2007) Hoodooh Music
- Space Between the Drops (2009) Trail Records
- Taking The Stage: 1997-2005 (2011) Trail Records
- Thieves and Sirens (2017) Trail Records
- Secrets of a Red Planet (2020) Trail Records
- Wandering in the Vastness (2022) Trail Records
- Everything Goes Somewhere (2023) Trail Records
- Immortal Jellyfish (2025) Trail Records

Their song "The Elephant Song" was featured on the soundtrack for the movie The Harvest. Their song "Shipwrecked" was featured on the soundtrack for the movie Tank Girl. Their song "Cornerman" was featured in the movie Higher Learning, playing from a jukebox.
