= Movie Review Intelligence =

Defunct movie review website

- Website type: Film review aggregator
- Available in: English
- Creator: David A. Gross
- Registration: None
- Launched: June 2009
- Current status: Shut Down April 2013

Movie Review Intelligence was a review aggregator website which collated and analyzed movie reviews. The site was established in 2009 by former studio executive David A. Gross, and has been described by critic Joe Williams as, "brainier than Rotten Tomatoes but less exclusive than Metacritic".

The site aggregated ratings from a large number of critics and provided a statistical breakdown of reviews, offering visual representation of results in charts and graphs. The ratings were collected from around 65 print and broadcast critics, selected by the website. Movie Review Intelligence gave every movie an average score, by counting the ratings, grades or stars each reviewer gives a movie, and assigning a grade to those reviews which do not include a numerical value. The site also weighted each review based on the circulation the review received. Other websites use different criteria to measure reviews; for example, the aggregator Metacritic weights reviews based on the "prestige" of a reviewer, while Rotten Tomatoes does not assign weight to its ratings based on the reviewers.

== Site Shut Down ==
Movie Review Intelligence discontinued publishing its popular aggregation website at the end of April 2013. David Gross said in a statement. "We are an independent website. As such, we do not have access to the content networks and mainstream moviegoers we set out to reach in order to continue our growth. And so we will stop at the end of April."
