= Blood/Candy =

Studio album by the Posies
- Released: September 10, 2010
- Recorded: 2010
- Genres: Alternative rock, power pop, indie rock
- Length: 42:34
- Label: Rykodisc
- Producer: The Posies

The Posies chronology
Every Kind of Light (2005)	Blood/Candy (2010)	Solid States (2016)

Professional ratings
Review scores
Source	Rating
AllMusic	link
Uncut	4/5 stars

Blood/Candy is the seventh studio album by American alternative rock band the Posies, released on September 28, 2010, by Rykodisc. It was the band's first album release in five years, following Every Kind of Light.

The Posies say this is something totally different from what they've tried before. "We subscribe to the 'evolve or perish' philosophy," co-founder Jon Auer says in a statement. "We directed ourselves to new places with this recording and tried not to travel down familiar paths when it could be avoided. Expect the unexpected"

"One of the things I was hoping to do on this record," says Auer, "was go back to the idea of Ken and me writing most of the songs, versus the last recording we did, where we kind of cobbled things together in the studio with everyone. I just felt like we needed to have that time to prepare and actually sit down and write." As a result, Stringfellow says, "I would say that I feel the songs on this one a bit deeper... there's stuff from way down in there that I think gives it a little more soul."

== Track listing ==
All tracks are written by Jon Auer and Ken Stringfellow.

No.	Title	Length
1.	"Plastic Paperbacks" (featuring Hugh Cornwell)	2:38
2.	"The Glitter Prize" (featuring Kay Hanley)	3:56
3.	"Licenses to Hide" (featuring Lisa Lobsinger)	4:02
4.	"So Caroline"	3:16
5.	"Take Care of Yourself"	4:02
6.	"Cleopatra Street"	3:36
7.	"For the Ashes"	3:31
8.	"Accidental Architecture"	3:33
9.	"She's Coming Down Again!"	4:40
10.	"Notion 99"	3:27
11.	"Holiday Hours"	3:40
12.	"Enewetak" (featuring Paco Loco)	2:30

== Personnel ==
The Posies

- Jon Auer - lead vocals, guitars
- Ken Stringfellow - lead vocals, guitars, keyboards
- Matt Harris - bass guitar
- Darius Minwalla - drums

Additional musicians

- Hugh Cornwell - vocals on "Plastic Paperbacks"
- Kay Hanley - vocals on "The Glitter Prize"
- Lisa Lobsinger vocals on "Licenses to Hide"
- Paco Loco - vocals on "Enewetak"
- Phil Peterson - string arrangements and cello on "Accidental Architecture", "Holiday Hours" and "The Glitter Prize"; trumpet on "Cleopatra Street"; flugelbone on "So Caroline"

Recorded and mixed by: Paco Loco, Jon Auer, Ken Stringfellow, Scott Greiner, Martin Davis Kinack, Daniel Pasquel, Phil Peterson, and Michael Eisenstein at Studio Paco Loco, El Puerto de Santa Maria, Spain; Le Domicile, Paris/Cussy-la-Colonne, France; Amberson Mansion, SoDo/Seattle, US; Eminence Recording, Seattle; Down in the Hole, Paris; Chillipeg-Winnewack Audio, Canada; La Increible Sociedad, Quito, Ecuador; The House of Breaking Glass, Seattle; and The Rumpus Room, Los Angeles, US

Mastered by Greg Calbi, Sterling Sound New York City
