= Until the Grinders Cease =

Studio album by Sky Cries Mary
- Released: 1989
- Recorded: 1988–1989
- Studio: Nor-Sound (Bellingham, Washington)
- Genre: Industrial; noise rock; psychedelic rock
- Length: 32:48
- Label: Lively Art

Sky Cries Mary chronology
Until the Grinders Cease (1989)	Don't Eat the Dirt... (1990)

Professional ratings
Review scores
Source	Rating
AllMusic	3/5 stars

Until the Grinders Cease is the debut studio album by Sky Cries Mary, released in 1989 through Lively Art.

== Track listing ==
All tracks are written by Sky Cries Mary.

No.	Title	Length
1.	"Propergenda"	4:16
2.	"Bath House"	3:08
3.	"Und Die Flamen"	4:50
4.	"Shakespeare Factory"	3:07
5.	"When the Fear Stops"	3:32
6.	"9 Nite Chant"	3:04
7.	"Desert Song"	4:34
8.	"Circus Church Nursery Rhyme"	6:17

== Personnel ==
- Jon Auer – bass guitar, percussion, vocals
- Roderick Wolgamott Romero – vocals, percussion
- Ken Stringfellow – guitar, drums, vocals, engineering, mixing
