= Solid States =

Studio album by The Posies
- Released: April 29, 2016
- Recorded: 2015
- Genre: Alternative rock, power pop, indie rock
- Length: 43:58
- Label: Lojinx
- Producer: Jon Auer, Ken Stringfellow, Colbey Haney, Eddie Grinnell, Frankie Siragusa, Steve Squire

The Posies chronology
Blood/Candy (2010)	Solid States (2016)

Solid States is the eighth and final studio album by American alternative rock band The Posies, released on 29 April 2016 by American label MyMusicEmpire. It was the band's first new album release in six years, and the first since the deaths of drummer Darius Minwalla and bass player Joe Skyward.

The band's first single, "Squirrel vs. Snake", was released as a free download on 3 March 2016, and an extensive month-long European tour promoting the album began on 29 March 2016. The band performed live as a trio with Frankie Siragusa on drums.

== Track listing ==
All tracks are written by Jon Auer and Ken Stringfellow.

No.	Title	Length
1.	"We R Power!"	2:53
2.	"Unlikely Places"	3:41
3.	"Scattered"	3:39
4.	"Titanic"	3:49
5.	"Squirrel Vs Snake"	3:54
6.	"March Climes"	3:49
7.	"M Doll"	3:01
8.	"The Definition"	3:42
9.	"The Plague"	3:59
10.	"Rollercoaster Zen"	3:38
11.	"The Sound Of Clouds"	3:50
12.	"Radiance"	4:03

== Personnel ==
The Posies

- Jon Auer
- Ken Stringfellow

Additional musicians

- Frankie Siragusa – drums (tracks: 2, 3, 4, 5, 6, 7, 8, 10, 12)
- Kliph Scurlock – drums (tracks: 1, 4, 9, 11)
- Tiz Aramini – additional vocals (tracks: 2, 4, 12)
- Aden Stringfellow – additional vocals (tracks: 1, 12)
- Gizelle Smith – additional vocals (tracks: 9)
- Skylar Gudasz – choir vocals (tracks: 4)
- Jeremy Harris – choir vocals (tracks: 4)
- Bill McShane – choir vocals (tracks: 4)
- Holly Muñoz – choir vocals (tracks: 4)
- Todd O'Keefe – choir vocals (tracks: 4)
- Ray Venta – choir vocals (tracks: 4)

Production

- Producer – Jon Auer, Ken Stringfellow, Colbey Haney, Eddie Grinnell, Frankie Siragusa, Steve Squire
- Mixing – Cameron Lister (tracks: 3, 5, 6, 8, 11), Frankie Siragusa (tracks: 2, 10, 12), Tony Hoffer (tracks: 3, 5, 6, 8, 11), Willie Linton (tracks: 1, 7, 9)
- Additional Mixing on "Titanic" – Keith Armstrong, Madison Scheckel

Artwork and Design

- Artwork, Art Direction – Dominique Stringfellow
- Design, Artwork – Elena Titova
