= Joe Williams (film critic) =

American film critic (1958–2015)

Joseph L. Williams (November 9, 1958 – July 26, 2015) was an American film critic for the St. Louis Post-Dispatch and STLtoday.com in St. Louis, Missouri. He was also the author of the books Entertainment on the Net, Hollywood Myths and The Grassy Knoll Report. Williams had been a staff writer for the newspaper since 1996. From 2003 to 2006, he was the on-camera movie reviewer for St. Louis TV station KMOV. He was a frequent guest on radio and television broadcasts in the region.

== Biography ==
Born on November 9, 1958, Williams attended public schools in St. Louis County, graduating in 1976 from Parkway West High School. He was a 1982 graduate of the University of Southern California, where his mentor was the novelist T.C. Boyle. He received a bachelor's degree in English from the school. Williams received his master's degree from the Missouri School of Journalism at the University of Missouri in 1987.

From 1988 to 1990, Williams was a staff writer for the music industry trade magazine Cashbox in Los Angeles, California. He is credited with being the first national critic to write about the band The Posies, who were signed to Geffen Records after Williams' review of the album Failure.

In 2012, Williams completed his second book, Hollywood Myths (Voyageur Press), an anthology of movie legends and lore.

In 2013, Williams published The Grassy Knoll Report, culminating his 30 years of research into the assassination of President John F. Kennedy.

Williams' reviews, columns and interviews with celebrities are syndicated to newspapers across the U.S. His reviews are excerpted on the popular Web sites Rotten Tomatoes, where he is listed as a "Top Critic," and Metacritic. Williams served as a juror, panelist and adjunct host for the annual St. Louis International Film Festival. On November 22, 2013, Williams and the festival hosted director Oliver Stone for a 50th anniversary discussion of the Kennedy assassination.

Williams was killed in a single-car accident on July 26, 2015, aged 56, in Jefferson County, Missouri. He was traveling southbound on Highway 67, when he veered too far to the left, over-corrected and drove into a ditch on the right side of the highway.
