= Success (The Posies album) =

Studio album by The Posies
- Released: 18 February 1998
- Studio: Egg Studios, Seattle, Washington
- Genre: Alternative rock
- Label: PopLlama
- Producer: The Posies, Johnny Sangster, Conrad Uno

The Posies chronology
Amazing Disgrace (1996)	Success (1998)	Dream All Day: The Best of the Posies (2000)

Professional ratings
Review scores
Source	Rating
AllMusic	2.5/5 stars
The Encyclopedia of Popular Music	3/5 stars
Pitchfork	8.0/10

Success is an album by the Seattle alternative rock band the Posies, released in 1998. The band broke up after the album's release; they regrouped in 2005.

== Critical reception ==
AllMusic called Success "the most laid-back album the Posies have recorded to date; freed of the glossy production of their Geffen years and of the major label pressure to record a 'hit,' they turned out an album that was more immediate, more relaxed, and more theirs."

== Track listing ==
All songs by Jon Auer and Ken Stringfellow.

1. "Somehow Everything"
2. "You’re the Beautiful One"
3. "Looking Lost"
4. "Fall Apart With Me"
5. "Placebo"
6. "Who to Blame"
7. "Start a Life"
8. "Friendship of the Future"
9. "Grow"
10. "Farewell Typewriter"
11. "Every Bitter Drop"
12. "Fall Song"

== Personnel ==
The Posies

- Jon Auer
- Ken Stringfellow
- Joe Skyward
- Brian Young

Production

- Conrad Uno, Johnny Sangster, The Posies - producer, mixing
- Mark Guenther - mastering

Artwork and Design

- Rusty Willoughby - cover art, design
- Bootsy Holler - photography
