= A Return to the Inner Experience =

Studio album by Sky Cries Mary
- Released: 1993
- Studio: Brilliant, San Francisco, California
- Genre: Neo-psychedelia, space rock, trance
- Length: 70:01
- Label: Capitol
- Producer: Norman Kerner

Sky Cries Mary chronology
Exit at the Axis (1992)	A Return to the Inner Experience (1993)	This Timeless Turning (1994)

A Return to the Inner Experience is the second album by the American band Sky Cries Mary, released in 1993 through Capitol Records. "Gone" was released as a single.

== Critical reception ==
Professional ratings
Review scores
Source	Rating
AllMusic	3.5/5 stars

The Washington Post noted that "the sometimes-realized intention is to be trippy, although a few of the 14 meandering tracks on this 70-minute album are more soporific than transcendent."

== Track listing ==
All tracks are written by Sky Cries Mary except "2000 Light Years from Home" by Jagger/Richards and "We Will Fall" by the Stooges.

No.	Title	Length
1.	"Walla Walla"	3:48
2.	"Moving Like Water"	4:26
3.	"Gone"	5:02
4.	"Circus Church"	3:52
5.	"2000 Light Years from Home"	4:44
6.	"When the Fear Stops"	4:14
7.	"Lay Down Your Head"	5:50
8.	"Rain"	8:10
9.	"Ocean Which Humanity Is"	5:22
10.	"Broken Down"	3:41
11.	"Rosaleen"	3:21
12.	"Buss to Gate 23"	4:33
13.	"Joey's Aria"	1:39
14.	"We Will Fall"	11:19

== Personnel ==
Sky Cries Mary

- DJ Fallout – sampler, turntables, drum machine
- Joseph E. Howard – double bass, mellotron, sitar
- Ben Ireland – drums, percussion
- Marc Olsen – guitar
- Gordon Raphael – keyboards
- Anisa Romero – vocals, art direction
- Roderick Wolgamott Romero – vocals, art direction

Production and additional personnel

- Beth Custer – bass clarinet on "Buss to Gate 23"
- Joe Gastwirt – mastering
- Norman Kerner – production, engineering, mixing
- Tommy Steele – art direction
- Stephen Walker – art direction, design
