= Dear 23 =

Studio album by The Posies
- Released: September 25, 1990
- Recorded: March 17 – April 21, 1990
- Studios: Crow Studios, Seattle, Washington
- Genre: Alternative rock
- Length: 48:03
- Label: DGC
- Producer: John Leckie

The Posies chronology
Failure (1988)	Dear 23 (1990)	Frosting on the Beater (1993)

Singles from Dear 23
- 1. "Golden Blunders" Released: 1990; 2. "Suddenly Mary" Released: 1991

Professional ratings
Review scores
Source	Rating
AllMusic	3.5/5 stars
The Encyclopedia of Popular Music	4/5 stars
Entertainment Weekly	B+
MusicHound Rock: The Essential Album Guide	4/5 stars
Rolling Stone	4/5 stars

Dear 23 is the second album by Seattle alternative rock/grunge/power pop band The Posies. The album was released in 1990 by DGC records and re-rereleased by Omnivore Recordings in 2018.

The first single was "Golden Blunders," which was later covered by Ringo Starr. "Apology" appears on Children of Nuggets: Original Artyfacts from the Second Psychedelic Era, 1976–1995.

== Critical reception ==
The Chicago Tribune called Dear 23 "one of the year`s most engaging albums," writing that it delivers "a contemporary edge to the mid-`60s British Invasion sound of groups such as the Hollies." Entertainment Weekly wrote that group "avoids self- conscious revivalism with strong, intelligent songwriting and a solidly modern rock beat." Spin praised the "harmony-laden power pop sound." Paste wrote that "the sound, coaxed to life by English producer John Leckie, seemed to literally erupt from the speakers, brimming with hooks, harmonies and songs so captivating and effusive, repeated listens became all but mandatory."

== Track listing ==
All tracks by Jon Auer & Ken Stringfellow

No.	Title	Length
1.	"My Big Mouth"	2:27
2.	"Golden Blunders"	4:28
3.	"Apology"	5:16
4.	"Any Other Way"	4:07
5.	"You Avoid Parties"	4:49
6.	"Suddenly Mary"	4:13
7.	"Help Yourself"	4:29
8.	"Mrs. Green"	5:52
9.	"Everyone Moves Away"	4:15
10.	"Flood of Sunshine"	8:22
Total length:		48:18

== Personnel ==
The Posies

- Jon Auer – vocals, guitars
- Ken Stringfellow – vocals, guitars
- Arthur "Rick" Roberts – bass
- Mike Musburger – drums

Technical

- Grant Alden – Typography
- Jon Auer – Engineer, Assistant Engineer
- Gary Gersh – Executive Producer
- Fred Kelly – Assistant Engineer
- John Leckie – Producer, Engineer, Mixing
- Stephen Marcussen – Mastering
- Karen Moskowitz – Photography
- Arthur "Rick" Roberts – Cover Art Concept
- Carl Smool – Set Design
- Dennis R. White – Art Direction, Set Design
