= Exit at the Axis =

EP by Sky Cries Mary
- Released: May 19, 1992
- Recorded: December 1991
- Studio: Robert Lang (Shoreline, Washington)
- Genre: Psychedelic rock
- Length: 22:29
- Label: Capitol
- Producer: Rick Boston

Sky Cries Mary chronology
Don't Eat the Dirt... (1990)	Exit at the Axis (1992)	A Return to the Inner Experience (1993)

Professional ratings
Review scores
Source	Rating
Allmusic	4/5 stars

Exit at the Axis is an EP by Sky Cries Mary, released on May 19, 1992 through Capitol Records.

== Track listing ==
No.	Title	Writer(s)	Length
1.	"Moon Dream Meadow Allegory"	Sky Cries Mary	4:52
2.	"Back to the Sea"	Sky Cries Mary, traditional	4:07
3.	"Cornerman"	Sky Cries Mary	5:28
4.	"Elephant Song"	Dave Allen, Sam-K, Sky Cries Mary	8:02

== Personnel ==
Sky Cries Mary

- DJ Fallout – sampler, turntables
- Joseph E. Howard – bass guitar
- Bennett James – drums, percussion
- Ivan Kral – guitar
- Gordon Raphael – guitar, keyboards, sampler
- Anisa Romero – vocals
- Roderick Wolgamott Romero – vocals, drum machine, art direction

Production and additional personnel

- Rick Boston – production, additional guitar
- Ian Caple – mixing, recording
- Cam Garrett – art direction, photography
- Tommy Steele – art direction
- Stephen Walker – design
