= Review aggregator =

System that collects reviews of products and services

A review aggregator is a system that collects reviews and ratings of products and services such as films, books, video games, music, software, hardware or cars. The system then stores the reviews to be used for supporting a website where users can view the reviews, sells information to third parties about consumer tendencies, and creates databases for companies to learn about their actual and potential customers. The system enables users to easily compare many different reviews of the same work. Many of these systems calculate an approximate average assessment, usually based on assigning a numeric value to each review related to its degree of positive rating of the work.

Review aggregation sites have begun to have economic effects on the companies that create or manufacture items under review, especially in certain categories such as electronic games, which are expensive to purchase. Some companies have tied royalty payment rates and employee bonuses to aggregate scores, and stock prices have been seen to reflect ratings, as related to potential sales. It is widely accepted in the literature that there is a strong correlation between sales and aggregated scores.

Due to the influence, manufacturers are often interested in measuring these reviews for their own products. This is often done using a business-facing product review aggregator. In the film industry, according to Reuters, big studios pay attention to aggregators but "they don't always like to assign much importance to them". Movie Review Intelligence was a review aggregator website, which collated and analyzed movie reviews.

== See also ==
- Rating site
- Review site
