= Songs from the Year of Our Demise =

Studio album by Jon Auer
- Released: May 2, 2006
- Genre: Alternative rock
- Length: 54:51
- Label: Pattern 25

Professional ratings
Review scores
Source	Rating
AllMusic	4/5 stars
Pitchfork	7.5
Tiny Mix Tapes	3.5/5 stars

Songs from the Year of Our Demise is the debut solo album from The Posies' Jon Auer. It was released on May 2, 2006, and highlighted by AllMusic as one of the best albums of the month.

== Track listing ==
All songs by Jon Auer unless otherwise noted.

1. "Six Feet Under" – 3:20
2. "Bottom of the Bottle" – 3:19
3. "The Likes of You" – 3:40
4. "Four Letter Word" – 3:02
5. "Angelita" – 4:04
6. "You Used to Drive Me Around" – 7:17
7. "Song Noir" (Jon Auer, Michelle Auer) – 2:57
8. "Daytime Lullaby" – 2:36
9. "Josephine" – 4:00
10. "Cemetery Song" – 2:58
11. "My Sweet Unknown" – 4:40
12. "Adios" – 1:59
13. "Sundown" – 3:28
14. "Wicked World" – 3:36
15. "The Year of Our Demise" – 3:55
