= Dream All Day =

Single by The Posies

from the album Frosting on the Beater
- Released: 1993
- Recorded: 1993
- Genre: Alternative rock, Power Pop
- Length: 3:04
- Label: DGC
- Songwriters: Ken Stringfellow and Jon Auer
- Producer: Don Fleming

"Dream All Day" is a song by the American alternative rock band The Posies, released as the first single released from its album Frosting on the Beater in 1993.

== Track listing ==
1. "Dream All Day"
2. "How She Lied by Living"
3. "Ever Since I Was Alone" (demo version)
4. "Open Every Window" (demo version)

== Notes ==
The demo of "Ever Since I Was Alone" was recorded on Ken's 4 track at home, October 1992. The version of "Open Every Window" is Jon's demo, recorded at Egg Studios, summer 1991. This was the first single that the Posies released in the UK.

== Charts ==
Chart (1993)	Peak position
US Alternative Airplay (Billboard)	4
US Mainstream Rock (Billboard)	17
