= Holly Muñoz =

American singer-songwriter (born 1981)

- Born: January 5, 1981 (age 45); El Paso, Texas, US
- Genres: Alternative rock; indie rock; country music
- Instruments: Guitar; vocals
- Years active: 2005–present

Holly Muñoz (born January 5, 1981) is an American rock and country musician and songwriter based in Austin, Texas.

== Early life and education ==
Muñoz was raised in El Paso, Texas, and attended Macalester College in St. Paul, Minnesota, where she double-majored in anthropology and history.

== Aviette ==
From 2005 to 2009, Muñoz was the lead vocalist and guitarist for the Minneapolis-based alternative rock band Aviette. The band released two albums and received national radio airplay. Notable achievements included having two songs featured on the MTV show The Real World, being selected as official showcase artists at the CMJ Music Marathon, and performing live on Minnesota public radio station KCMP 89.3 The Current.

== HOLLY ==
After leaving Aviette, Muñoz was commissioned by the Jerome Foundation to compose and perform an improvisational music piece at The Cedar Cultural Center and later relocated from Minneapolis to San Francisco.

A year after arriving in California, she left her career as a fundraiser with the San Francisco Symphony, with only $2,000 in savings, to focus on being a full-time musician. Over the course of 20 days, she raised a record-breaking $50,000 on Tilt to work on a solo album produced by John Vanderslice. The campaign was the largest successful musical campaign on the platform and the seventh largest campaign overall for 2013.

Her album, Maps and Lists, was released on September 16, 2014, under the moniker HOLLY and features original album artwork by graphic novelist Anders Nilsen. After releasing the album, she embarked on a 45-city tour, preceded by album release parties in Minneapolis, San Francisco, and New York City, featuring Ken Stringfellow from The Posies, Big Star, and R.E.M. She also performed a live set on KEXP-FM in Seattle.

In January 2015, Muñoz successfully completed another $50,000 crowdfunding campaign to record and release "#2 Record," a double concept album featuring two versions of each song. One version featured Muñoz on vocals, while the other featured collaborating artists, including Vanderslice, Stringfellow, Alan Sparhawk (of Low), John Hermanson (of Storyhill and Alva Star), and Brian Tighe (of The Hang Ups).

In March 2015, Muñoz and Stringfellow announced they would be recording a country album together. The album was a concept record inspired by Willie Nelson's Red Headed Stranger and featured Vicki Peterson from The Bangles and Matthew Caws of Nada Surf. It received positive reviews. The Boston Globe commented that it was a "fascinating left-field listen," noting "the gorgeous back-and-forth dueting of Stringfellow and Muñoz." Willie Nelson's daughter, Amy Nelson, also called the album "amazing" on her Instagram feed and thanked them on behalf of the Nelson family.

More recently, Muñoz has been involved in creating an Afro-pop group called "Ambassadors," alongside Dalmar Yare from the group Waayaha Cusub, Martin Dosh, and others.

== Work with non-profits ==
Holly Muñoz co-founded and served on the board of the Mid-Continent Oceanographic Institute (formerly known as the Rock Star Supply Company), a non-profit creative writing and tutoring center in the Twin Cities. She also served on the board of Voice of Witness, an organization that uses oral history and education programs to illuminate contemporary human rights crises both domestically and internationally.

== Selected discography ==
=== Solo ===
- Maps and Lists (2014)
- #2 Record (2015)
- #2 Record B-Sides (2015)

=== with Maelee Whitman ===
- Apt. 3E (2003)
- West of Pleasant (2004)

=== with Aviette ===
- Until We Hear From Dave (2006)
- The Way We Met (2008)

=== with Holly & Ken ===
- The Record: A Country Concept Album (2015)

=== Appearances ===
- Adam Svec “Somewhere Under The Rainbow" Enemy Swimmer (2008)
- Al Church “You Came Into My Life” Next Summer (2015)
- The Posies “Titanic" Solid States (2016)
