= Moonbathing on Sleeping Leaves =

Studio album by Sky Cries Mary
- Released: February 25, 1997
- Recorded: May 1996
- Studio: Robert Lang (Shoreline, Washington)
- Genre: Psychedelic rock
- Length: 73:46
- Label: Warner Bros.
- Producer: Paul Fox, Sky Cries Mary

Sky Cries Mary chronology
This Timeless Turning (1994)	Moonbathing on Sleeping Leaves (1997)	Fresh Fruits for the Liberation (1998)

Moonbathing on Sleeping Leaves is the fourth album by Sky Cries Mary, released in 1997 through Warner Bros. Records. It was the band's first album for a major label.

== Production ==
The album was produced by Paul Fox and the band. Krist Novoselic contributes acoustic bass to one song.

== Critical reception ==
Professional ratings
Review scores
Source	Rating
AllMusic	3/5 stars
The Encyclopedia of Popular Music	3/5 stars
Lincoln Journal Star	4/5 stars
Los Angeles Times	3/4 stars
MusicHound Rock: The Essential Album Guide	3.5/5 stars

The Encyclopedia of Popular Music called Moonbathing on Sleeping Leaves "an impressively diverse album that experimented with ambient and trance grooves." The Lincoln Journal Star called it "mesmerizing," writing that the band "creates its fascinating, lush sound mixture by playing everything – from farfisa organ and Moog synthesizer to finger cymbals, castanets and, literally, the kitchen sink."

== Track listing ==
All tracks are written by Sky Cries Mary.

No.	Title	Length
1.	"Breathe In"	4:51
2.	"An Ant, the Stars, an Owl and Its Prey"	5:45
3.	"Moonbathing"	4:16
4.	"Grey Eyes"	4:16
5.	"Queen of Slug Theater"	5:44
6.	"Ringing"	4:58
7.	"Smoke Break"	1:26
8.	"Want"	5:46
9.	"The Headless Man (Another Song)"	3:37
10.	"Sister"	5:29
11.	"Deep River"	8:06
12.	"Gliding"	4:50
13.	"Nowhere"	5:38
14.	"Insectoria"	9:04

== Personnel ==
Sky Cries Mary

- Michael Cozzi – guitar
- Juano Davison – bass guitar
- Bennett James – drums, percussion
- Gordon Raphael – guitar, synthesizer, sampler, organ
- Todd Robbins – sampler, turntables, vocoder, synthesizer, drum machine
- Anisa Romero – vocals, harmonium, painting
- Roderick Wolgamott Romero – vocals, synthesizer

Production and additional personnel

- Paul Fox – production
- Stephen Marcussen – mastering
- Sky Cries Mary – production
- Ed Thacker – engineering, mixing
