= Frosting on the Beater =

Studio album by The Posies
- Released: April 27, 1993
- Studios: Ironwood Studios, Seattle, Washington; Sear Sound, New York City
- Genres: Alternative rock; power pop
- Length: 48:39
- Label: DGC
- Producer: Don Fleming

The Posies chronology
Dear 23 (1990)	Frosting on the Beater (1993)	Amazing Disgrace (1996)

Singles from Frosting on the Beater
- 1. "Dream All Day" Released: 1993; 2. "Solar Sister" Released: 1993; 3. "Flavor of the Month" Released: 1993; 4. "Definite Door" Released: 1994

Professional ratings
Review scores
Source	Rating
AllMusic	4.5/5 stars
Chicago Tribune	3/4 stars
Los Angeles Times	3/4 stars
Mojo	4/5 stars
NME	6/10
PopMatters	9/10

Frosting on the Beater is the third album by American rock band The Posies, released in 1993. It featured a darker sound than the band's prior works, in part due to production duties being handled by Don Fleming. "Dream All Day", "Solar Sister" and "Definite Door" were released as singles, with the first two getting moderate airplay and the third being the band's only single to break the UK top 75. Frosting on the Beater was the last album original drummer Mike Musburger appeared on.

"Flavor of the Month" was a swipe at the many overnight-sensation grunge bands in The Posies' hometown of Seattle. "Coming Right Along" appeared on the soundtrack to the movie The Basketball Diaries (1995, Island Records). "Dream All Day" was later used as the title of the band's best-of compilation, released in 2000. The Posies later remade "Flavor of the Month" with brand-new lyrics as "Voyage of the Aquanauts" for the series Bill Nye the Science Guy.

== Track listing ==
All tracks are written by Jon Auer and Ken Stringfellow

No.	Title	Length
1.	"Dream All Day"	3:03
2.	"Solar Sister"	3:20
3.	"Flavor of the Month"	2:34
4.	"Love Letter Boxes"	3:09
5.	"Definite Door"	4:12
6.	"Burn & Shine"	6:56
7.	"Earlier than Expected"	3:33
8.	"20 Questions"	3:54
9.	"When Mute Tongues Can Speak"	3:28
10.	"Lights Out"	4:14
11.	"How She Lied by Living"	3:58
12.	"Coming Right Along"	6:18
Total length:		48:39

== Personnel ==
Credits taken from Frosting on the Beater liner notes.

The Posies

- Jon Auer – guitar, vocals, bass, vibraphone
- Ken Stringfellow – guitar, vocals, bass, organ, piano
- Dave Fox – bass
- Mike Musburger – drums

Production

- Don Fleming – producer
- Stephen Marcussen – mastering
- David Bianco – mixing (tracks: 1–3, 5, 6, 8–12)
- Adam Kasper, Jim Waters, Jon Auer – engineer
- Jamie Seyberth, Mark Guilbeault – assistant engineer, mixing
- Fred Kevorkian – assistant engineer

Artwork and design

- Kevin Reagan – art direction, design
- Dennis Keeley – photography
