= Amazing Disgrace =

Studio album by The Posies
- Released: May 14, 1996
- Studio: Robert Lang (Shoreline, Washington)
- Genre: Alternative rock
- Length: 49:58
- Label: DGC
- Producer: Nick Launay; Steve Fisk on "Ontario"

The Posies chronology
Frosting on the Beater (1993)	Amazing Disgrace (1996)	Success (1998)

Professional ratings
Review scores
Source	Rating
AllMusic	3.5/5 stars
Robert Christgau	B+
The Encyclopedia of Popular Music	3/5 stars
Entertainment Weekly	A−
MusicHound Rock: The Essential Album Guide	3/5 stars

Amazing Disgrace is the fourth album by the Seattle alternative rock band the Posies, released in 1996. It was their final release for DGC Records.

== Production ==
As was the case on previous albums, the band's label told the Posies to return to the studio to record more "'hit material.'" Cheap Trick's Robin Zander and Rick Nielsen appear on "Hate Song."

== Critical reception ==
Robert Christgau wrote: "Of course it's not the Beatles or Big Star—merely emulated, the formal ideas don't sustain their excitement." The Washington Post wrote that the album's "combination of pretty melody and ugly thoughts is utterly contemporary." Trouser Press called the album "surprisingly sour but still delicious."

== Track listing ==
All songs by Jon Auer and Ken Stringfellow.

1. "Daily Mutilation" – 4:04
2. "Ontario" – 2:38
3. "Throwaway" – 3:53
4. "Please Return It" – 3:51
5. "Hate Song" – 4:06
6. "Precious Moments" – 3:47
7. "Fight It (If You Want)" – 3:04
8. "Everybody Is a Fucking Liar" – 3:15
9. "World" – 3:57
10. "Grant Hart" – 2:25
11. "Broken Record" – 2:40
12. "The Certainty" – 2:28
13. "Song #1" – 5:39
14. "¿Will You Ever Ease Your Mind?" – 3:51
15. "Terrorized" – 04:11 (Bonus Track)

== Personnel ==
The Posies

- Jon Auer – guitar, vocals
- Ken Stringfellow – guitar, vocals
- Joe Skyward – bass "found around 110 Hz"
- Brian Young – drums

Additional personnel

- Jessica Lurie – tenor saxophone on "Please Return It"
- Barbara Marino – baritone saxophone on "Please Return It"
- Robin Zander – vocal "screams" on "Hate Song"
- Rick Nielsen – guitar "freakout" on "Hate Song"
- Steve Fisk – keyboards on "Broken Record"
- Gavin Guss – trumpet on "Broken Record"
- Roderick Wolgamott Romero – "mumbling undertaker" vocals on "Broken Record"

Production

- Nick Launay – producer
- Steve Fisk – additional production on "Ontario"
- John Goodmanson, Nick Launay – engineer
- Jon Auer, Keith Cleversley – engineer (additional)
- Aaron Warner, John Burton, Mark Rosnick, Steve Culp – assistant engineer
- Greg Calbi – mastering

Artwork and design

- Tim Gabor – art direction, design
- Otto Bettmann, United Press International – photography (cover)
- Duncan Price, Joe Bass, Lance Mercer, Nordic Joe – photography (photographs)

== Charts ==
Chart performance for Amazing Disgrace
Chart (1996)	Peak position
Australian Albums (ARIA)	81
Dutch Albums (Album Top 100)	72
Swedish Albums (Sverigetopplistan)	23
