= The Disciplines =

Norwegian garage rock band

- Origin: Oslo, Norway
- Genre: Garage Rock
- Years active: 2007 – 2012
- Labels: Voices of Wonder (Norway/DK); Tin Robot Records (UK); 2Fer-PIAS(Spain); Second Motion (USA); S'Music (South America); Spark & Shine (Germany/A/CH); V2 Records (Benelux)
- Members: Ken Stringfellow; Alexander 'Ralla' Vilnes; Baard Helgeland; Bjorn Bergene
- Past members: Claus Larsen

The Disciplines is a garage rock band from Oslo, Norway, led by singer Ken Stringfellow (The Posies, R.E.M. and Big Star).

== Name Dispute ==
In 2019, another band believed that The Disciplines name was too similar to theirs, which caused them to pursue legal action against The Disciplines. There are no specifics on whether this has been resolved, however an unfavorable ruling for The Disciplines could result in losing rights to their discography. Efforts have been made by The Disciplines to resolve the dispute amicably, but the other party has not been responsive to any resolutions.

== Discography ==
=== Albums ===
- Smoking Kills (2009), Voices of Wonder (Norway/DK), Weekender (UK), 2Fer-PIAS(Spain), Second Motion (USA), S'Music (South America), Spark & Shine (Germany/A/CH) and V2 Records (Benelux)
- Virgins of Menace (2011), Rock's My Ass Records www.rocksmyassrecords.com (France), SPARK & SHiNE (North America/Germany/Netherlands), Tin Robot (UK/Ireland), Naked Man (Spain/Portugal) VOW (Norway/Denmark), Other Tongues (NZ/Australia)

=== Singles ===
- '"Fate's a Strong Bitch (feat Lydia Lunch)"/"Urbane Problemer" (Kjøtt cover) 7" single
- "Best Mistake"/"No Vacancy" 7" single
- "Yours for the Taking" 7" single
- "There's a Law" 7" single
