= This Timeless Turning =

Studio album by Sky Cries Mary
- Released: July 26, 1994
- Recorded: February 1994
- Studio: Robert Lang (Shoreline, Washington)
- Genre: Psychedelic rock, space rock, trance
- Length: 68:37
- Label: World Domination
- Producer: Ian Caple

Sky Cries Mary chronology
A Return to the Inner Experience (1993)	This Timeless Turning (1994)	Moonbathing on Sleeping Leaves (1997)

This Timeless Turning is an album by Sky Cries Mary. It was released in 1994 through World Domination Recordings.

== Release ==
To promote the album, Sky Cries Mary broadcast a complete concert live on the internet, the first band to ever do so.

== Critical reception ==
Professional ratings
Review scores
Source	Rating
AllMusic	3/5 stars
The Encyclopedia of Popular Music	3/5 stars
MusicHound Rock: The Essential Album Guide	3.5/5 stars

AllMusic called This Timeless Turning the band's masterpiece.

== Track listing ==
All tracks are written by Sky Cries Mary except "Shipwrecked" and "Deep Sunless Sea" by Sky Cries Mary and Joe Skyward.

No.	Title	Length
1.	"Shipwrecked"	4:05
2.	"Vuh"	4:19
3.	"Don't Forget the Sky"	5:25
4.	"These Old Bones"	4:03
5.	"Stretched"	3:44
6.	"Every Iceberg Is Afire"	3:47
7.	"Scapegoat"	4:07
8.	"Sister Ship Twenty Three"	1:03
9.	"Deep Sunless Sea"	6:50
10.	"Slow Down Time"	5:51
11.	"Objects in the Mirror"	5:14
12.	"4:00 A.M."	14:48
13.	"Walk of Nothingness"	5:21

== Personnel ==
Sky Cries Mary

- Michael Cozzi – guitar
- Juano Davison – bass guitar
- Ben Ireland – drums, percussion
- Gordon Raphael – guitar, synthesizer, sampler, organ
- Todd Robbins – sampler, turntables, vocoder, synthesizer, drum machine
- Anisa Romero – vocals, harmonium, painting
- Roderick Wolgamott Romero – vocals, synthesizer

Production and additional personnel

- Tom Baker – mastering
- Robin Boomer – cello
- Ian Caple – production, engineering, mixing
- Ophelia Chong – art direction
- Larry Halpern – soprano saxophone, flute
- Serge – didgeridoo
- Sky Cries Mary – production
- Dee Young – cover art
