= Failure (The Posies album) =

Studio album by The Posies
- Released: 1988
- Recorded: December 1987 – February 1988
- Studio: Studio X, Seattle; NorSound, Bellingham, Washington
- Genre: Alternative rock
- Length: 42:23
- Label: PopLlama
- Producer: Jon Auer, Ken Stringfellow

The Posies chronology
Failure (1988)	Dear 23 (1990)

Professional ratings
Review scores
Source	Rating
AllMusic	4/5 stars

Failure is the debut album of The Posies. It was first released independently in 1988 on cassette only. In 1989 it was reissued on cassette, LP and CD on PopLlama Records.

Members Jon Auer and Ken Stringfellow began work on Failure near the end of 1987, although the band had previously recorded some demos earlier that summer. Some of the sessions were conducted at a recording studio constructed by Auer and his father, which housed an 8-track analog tape machine and a small mixing console. Auer mixed the album in one night using headphones in the absence of Stringfellow, who was on vacation with his family in Hawaii.

Due to playing time restrictions imposed by the LP manufacturer, the band was forced to drop one song from the PopLlama LP edition. The CD version had no time restrictions and includes the same content as the cassette.

It was later remastered and reissued again in 2004 on Houston Party Records. "I May Hate You Sometimes" appears in Children of Nuggets: Original Artyfacts from the Second Psychedelic Era, 1976–1995, and was also featured in the 2000 Daria telemovie Is It Fall Yet? as the ending-credits song.

== Track listing ==
All songs by Jon Auer and Ken Stringfellow.

1. "Blind Eyes Open" – 3:55
2. "The Longest Line" – 3:12
3. "Under Easy" – 3:25
4. "Like Me Too" – 3:35
5. "I May Hate You Sometimes" – 3:20
6. "Ironing Tuesdays" – 2:56
7. "Paint Me" – 4:05
8. "Believe in Something Other (Than Yourself)" – 4:10
9. "Compliment?" – 3:22
10. "At Least for Now" – 3:33
11. "Uncombined" – 4:00 (not included on the PopLlama LP edition)
12. "What Little Remains" – 2:50

=== Bonus tracks (15th Anniversary edition) ===
1. "I May Hate You Sometimes" – Demo
2. "Paint Me" – Demo
3. "Like Me Too" – Demo
4. "Allison Hubbard" – Instrumental
5. "After May A Summer Dies a Swan" – Instrumental
6. "Blind Eyes Open" – Instrumental Demo
7. "I May Hate You Sometimes" – Alternative Version
8. "Compliment?" – Alternative Version

== Personnel ==
Credits taken from Failure liner notes.

The Posies

- Jon Auer – guitar, vocals, piano, drums
- Ken Stringfellow – guitar, bass, vocals, claves

Production

- The Posies – producer
- John Golden – mastering
- Chris McClurken, Ken Stringfellow – engineer (additional), mixing (additional)
- Jon Auer – engineer, mixing

Artwork and Design

- Beau Fredericks – design, cover art
- Jill Goodejohn – photography
