= In Case You Didn't Feel Like Plugging In =

Live album by the Posies
- Released: 15 August 2000
- Recorded: 24 February 2000
- Venue: The Showbox, Seattle, Washington
- Genre: Alternative rock, acoustic rock power pop
- Label: Casa Recording Co.

The Posies chronology
Alive Before the Iceberg (2000)	In Case You Didn't Feel Like Plugging In (2000)	At Least, at Last (2000)

Professional ratings
Review scores
Source	Rating
Pitchfork Media	7.5/10 stars

In Case You Didn't Feel Like Plugging In is a live album by Seattle alt-rock band the Posies. The recording was made at a February 2000 show on the band's acoustic tour, at The Showbox in Seattle.

== Track listing ==
1. "Grant Hart"
2. "Every Bitter Drop"
3. "Flavor of the Month"
4. "Believe in Something Other (Than Yourself)"
5. "Suddenly Mary"
6. (Tape Change Break)
7. "Solar Sister"
8. "I May Hate You Sometimes"
9. (Sick F's)
10. "Please Return It"
11. "Precious Moments"
12. (Brownie)
13. "Throwaway"
