= Smoking Kills (album) =

Studio album by The Disciplines
- Released: 2009
- Studio: Trale Studios (Buenos Aires)
- Genre: Garage rock
- Label: Voices of Wonder (Norway & Denmark); Weekender (UK); Second Motion (USA)

The Disciplines chronology
Smoking Kills (2009)	Virgins of Menace (2011)

Professional ratings
Review scores
Source	Rating
AllMusic	4/5 stars
American Songwriter	4/5 stars
Sonic Magazine	6/10 stars

Smoking Kills is the debut album of The Disciplines, released in 2009.

== Track listing ==
No.	Title	Length
1.	"Yours For The Taking"	2:19
2.	"Wrong Lane"	2:23
3.	"Get It Right"	2:52
4.	"Best Mistake"	2:41
5.	"There's A Law"	2:50
6.	"Falling Knives"	3:07
7.	"Hurricane"	3:02
8.	"I Got Tired"	3:05
9.	"Like So Many Times Before"	3:11
10.	"No Vacancy"	2:45
11.	"Cause Or FX"	2:29
12.	"Shadow of Your Doubt"	4:23
13.	"Oslo"	3:30
