= Jeff Guess =

Australian poet (born 1948)

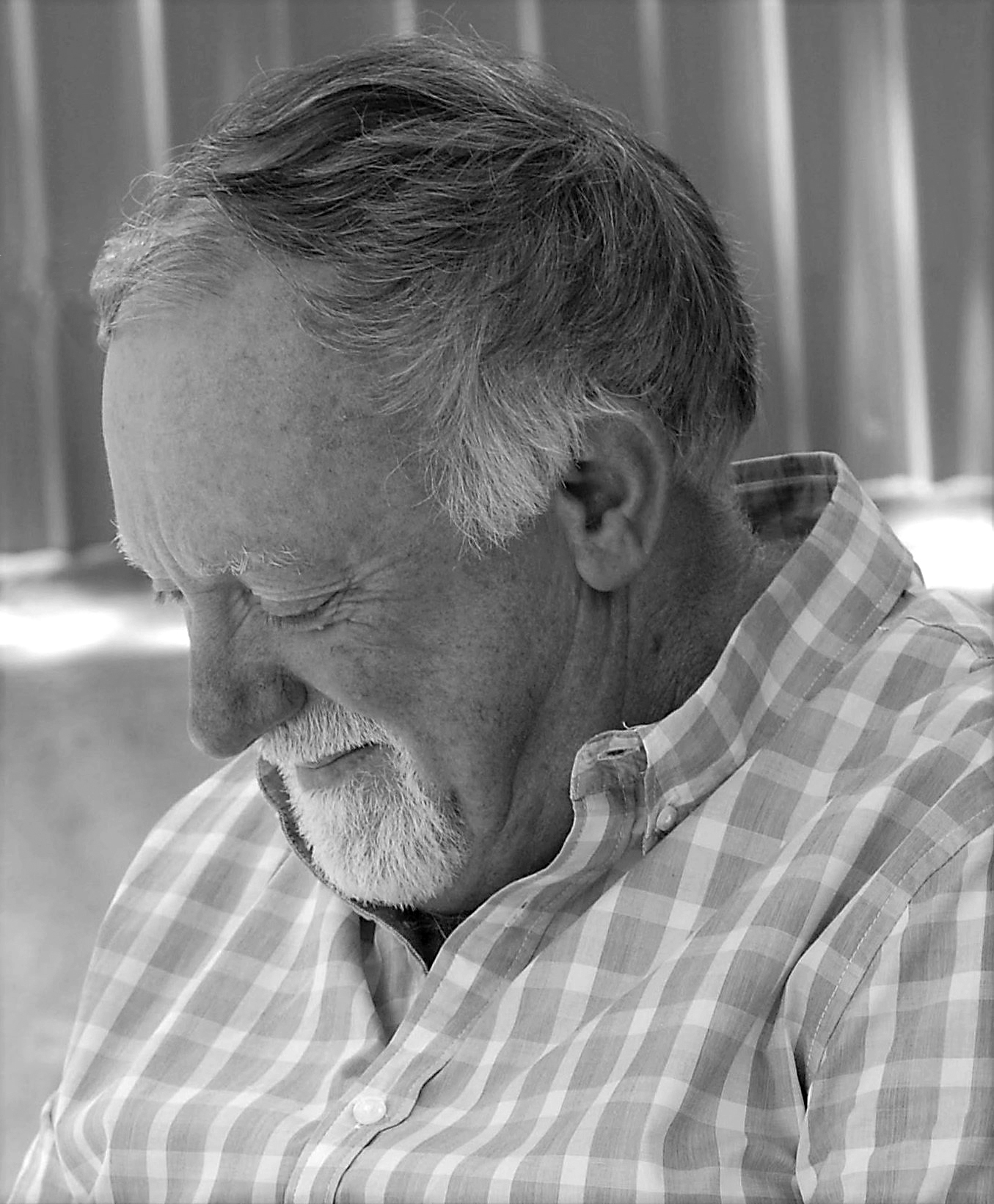
- Guess in 2020
- Born: 16 February 1948 (age 78); Adelaide, South Australia, Australia
- Occupation: Poet
- Website: www.jeffguess.com

Jeff Guess (born 16 February 1948) is an Australian poet based in Adelaide, South Australia. He has published many poetry compilations, as well as educational books on poetry instruction and multiple poetry anthologies.

== Early life and education ==
Guess was born in Adelaide, South Australia.

== Career ==
Guess has held positions teaching English at various secondary schools; as well as working as an instructor at the Adelaide Institute of TAFE, and tutoring at the University of South Australia.

His debut collection, Leaving Maps (1984) was well received by contemporaries.

He co-authored Hands on Poetry, a teaching resource for primary school poetry education.

== Recognition and awards ==
Guess has won various awards for his poetry in addition to writing grants. He has been invited to serve on the panels of various poetry contests, including the John Bray Award.

He is mentioned in the Oxford Companion to Australian Literature.

== Collections ==
- Leaving Maps (Friendly Street Poets 1984)
- Four in the Afternoon (Studio 1987)
- Painting the Town: The Gawler Poems (Wakefield Press 1988)
- Replacing Fuses in the House of Cards (Poetry Australia 1988)
- Rites of Arrival: Poems from Museums of the History Trust of SA (Wakefield Press 1990).
- Selected Sonnets (Collins/A&R 1991)
- Living in the Shade of Nothing Solid (Five Islands Press 1998)
- Winter Grace (Five Islands Press 2004)
- The Silent Classroom (Pembroke 2008)
- Autumn in Cantabile: The Gawler Poems (Trinity College 2011)
- Supposing Him to be the Gardener: The Mary Magdalen Suite (Sherwin & Stone 2017)
- Scanning the Soul (Sherwin & Stone 2019)
- The River of Footsteps (Sherwin & Stone 2019)
- Meditations (Sherwin & Stone 2020)
- The Translation of Rain: Selected Poems (Sherwin & Stone 2020)
- The Bee Farm (Sherwin & Stone 2021)
- Collected Sonnets (Sherwin & Stone 2022)
- Home Before Dark (Sherwin & Stone 2024)
- In the Apricot Darkness (Sherwin & Stone 2025)

== Anthologies ==
- The No. 12 Friendly Street Reader (Friendly Street Poets 1987).
- The Inner Courtyard: A South Australian Anthology of Love Poetry (Wakefield Press 1990).
- The House Next Door (Salisbury Council 1992).
- The No. 18 Friendly Street Reader (Friendly Street Poets 1994).
- Poetry After Lunch: The University Readings (Adelaide University 1996).
- A Fall of Rainbows (Williamstown Women Writers 1997).
- No Strings Attached (Eremos 1999).
- New Poets Seven (Friendly Street Poets/Wakefield Press 2002).
- Encounters (Ariel 2002).
- Two Schools of Thought (Pembroke School 2008)
- My Teacher Is a Ballerina (Trinity College 2011)
