= Alive Before the Iceberg =

Live album by The Posies
- Released: 18 April 2000
- Recorded: 28 July 1998
- Genre: Alternative rock, power pop
- Label: Houston Party Records (Spain)

The Posies chronology
Dream All Day: The Best of the Posies (2000)	Alive Before the Iceberg (2000)	In Case You Didn't Feel Like Plugging In (2000)

Alive Before the Iceberg is a live album by Seattle Alternative rock band The Posies. Recorded live at Luz De Gas (in Barcelona, Spain) on July 28, 1998.

== Track listing ==
1. "Somehow Everything" – 3:49
2. "Please Return It" – 3:26
3. "Dream All Day" – 2:57
4. "You’re the Beautiful One" – 6:11
5. "Start a Life" – 5:07
6. "Precious Moments" – 3:40
7. "Grant Hart" – 2:05
8. "Flavor of the Month" – 2:59
9. "Everybody Is a Fucking Liar" – 3:13
10. "Broken Record" – 3:36
11. "Surrender" – 6:25
12. "Throwaway" – 3:55

== Personnel ==
The Posies

- Jon Auer – guitar, vocals
- Ken Stringfellow – guitar, vocals
- Joe Skyward – bass
- Brian Young – drums
