= HNoMS Oslo =

At least two ships of the Royal Norwegian Navy have been named HNoMS Oslo, after the city of Oslo:

- HNoMS Oslo (1946), a C-class destroyer purchased from the Royal Navy in 1946 and broken up in 1968.
- HNoMS Oslo (F300), an Oslo-class frigate launched in 1964 and wrecked in 1994.
