= At Least, at Last =

Box set by the Posies
- Released: May 6, 2003
- Recorded: 1987–1998
- Genre: Power pop
- Label: Not Lame

The Posies chronology
In Case You Didn't Feel Like Plugging In (2000)	At Least, at Last (2003)	Every Kind of Light (2005)

At Least, at Last is an album from the band the Posies, released in 2003.

At Least, at Last is a box set containing a "history" of the Posies b-sides, demos, and outtakes from 1987–1998 on four discs. Published by Not Lame records, this box set was produced to satisfy fans after the reported "demise" of the band in 2000. Although the band has since reformed with the release of an E.P. and three new full-length studio albums, the box set has been a "holy grail" in most Posies fans collections. This set is currently out of print and the Posies have no intention to re-publish it.

Some highlights on the boxed set include a cover of Blondies' song, "Dreaming", and a song recorded for the television program, Bill Nye the Science Guy, entitled "Oceanic Exploration" to the tune of their original song "Flavor of the Month". Also included in the set are liner notes for each song written by both founding members.

== Lyrics & Track information ==
=== DISC ONE: 1987 – 1991 ===
1. Believe in Something Other (Than Yourself) (live at FOE, Bellingham 8.28.87)
2. I Don't Want to Talk to You (demo)
3. Help Yourself (demo)
4. Thinking Outloud (demo)
5. Apology (Ken's demo)
6. I May Hate You Sometimes (live at the Moore Theatre, Seattle 12.8.88)
7. Keep Me Guessing (studio outtake)
8. Diary of an Insecure Girl (demo)
9. Now They Want Your Head (demo)
10. What Am I Supposed to Do (studio outtake)
11. Any Other Way (demo)
12. Suddenly Mary (demo)
13. Apology (Jon's demo)
14. Beck's Bolero (studio outtake)
15. 21 (studio outtake)
16. This One's Taken (studio outtake)
17. Magnifying Mirror (studio outtake)
18. Ramblin' Rose (live at the OK Hotel, Seattle, 8.25.91)
19. Spite and Malice (intro vocals a capella)

=== DISC TWO: 1992 – 1993 ===
1. Flood of Sunshine (live at RCKCNDY, Seattle, 5.16.92)
2. Dream All Day (demo)
3. ¿Will You Ever Ease Your Mind? (demo)
4. Ever Since I Was Alone (demo)
5. Going Going Gone (demo)
6. Forrest Recovery (demo)
7. Sullen Waistcoat (demo)
8. Depression Child (demo)
9. Solar Sister (demo)
10. Finally See It Right (demo)
11. Earlier Than Expected (demo)
12. Ladies and Gentlemen (demo)
13. When Mute Tongues Can Speak (demo)
14. Lights Out (demo)
15. How She Lied by Living (demo)
16. Féte le Muzz (studio outtake)
17. Velvet Monkey Theme (studio outtake)

=== DISC THREE: 1993 – 1994 ===
1. Trace My Falls (demo)
2. Burn & Shine (French radio, 1993)
3. Dreaming (2 Meter Sessions-Dutch Radio/TV-11.1.93)
4. Wiggly World (studio outtake)
5. Come Along and Dance (demo)
6. Revelation to Follow (demo)
7. Daily Mutilation (demo)
8. You're the Beautiful One (demo)
9. World (demo)
10. Pay You Back in Time (demo)
11. Throwaway (demo)
12. Sad to Be Aware (demo)
13. Everybody Is a Fucking Liar (demo)
14. Somehow Everything (demo)
15. Fight It (If You Want) (demo)
16. Oh Michael (demo)

=== DISC FOUR: 1994 – 1998 ===
1. Hate Song (demo)
2. Broken Record (demo)
3. Terrorized (non-US album track)
4. Star-Spangled Banner (live at the Kingdome, Seattle 1995)
5. Surrender (studio outtake)
6. What's Going Ahn (studio outtake)
7. Grant Hart (live on Swedish radio, 1996)
8. Ontario (live at Podi-Jum Rock Festival, Belgium, 4.5.97)
9. Oceanic Exploration (recorded for 'Bill Nye, the Science Guy'-US TV)
10. Start a Life (live at the LVC, Netherlands, 8.12.98)
11. Flavor of the Month (live at the Crocodile Cafe, Seattle 2.13.98)
12. Solar Sister (live at the Bottom of the Hill, San Francisco 9.18.98)
13. Golden Blunders (Muzak version)
14. Suddenly Mary (Muzak version)
