= Ken Stringfellow =

American musician

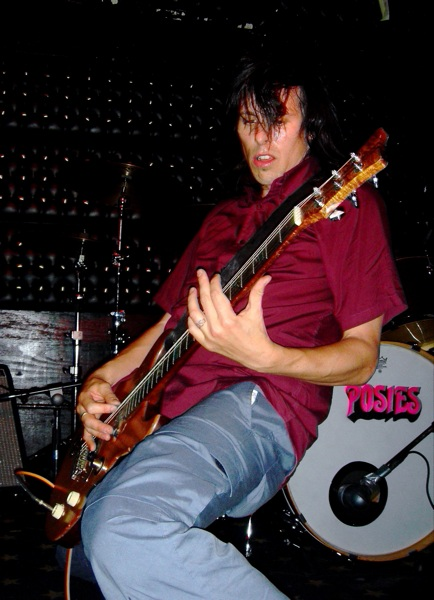
- Stringfellow performing with the Posies in 2005

Background information
- Born: Kenneth Stuart Stringfellow; October 30, 1968 (age 57); Hollywood, California, U.S.
- Genres: Alternative rock; punk rock; power pop
- Instruments: Vocals; guitar; keyboards; bass guitar
- Years active: 1988–present
- Labels: Hidden Agenda; Sony Music; Manifesto; Yep Roc; Sellout! Records; King of Patio Records; Blue Collar Distro; Lojinx; Thick Syrup Records; Spark & Shine
- Website: kenstringfellow.com

Kenneth Stuart Stringfellow (born October 30, 1968) is an American singer, songwriter, multi-instrumentalist, arranger, and producer. Best known for his work with The Posies, R.E.M., and the re-formed Big Star, Stringfellow's discography includes more than 200 albums.

== Early life and education ==
Stringfellow was born in Hollywood, California. His father, a television executive, relocated the family frequently as his career developed, and Stringfellow went to elementary schools in New York, Chicago, and Detroit. After his parents divorced in 1978, he moved to Bellingham, Washington. In high school, Stringfellow, who had learned to play piano at nine and guitar at 11, met Jon Auer, with whom he would later form The Posies.

Stringfellow attended college at the University of Washington, where he and Auer remained in touch, trading cassettes of songs.

== Career ==
=== The Posies ===
In 1988, Stringfellow and Auer began playing together as The Posies and self-released their first album, Failure, which included some of the earlier material they'd written separately. Immediately after the record's release, Stringfellow left the University of Washington to focus on the Posies full-time.

Failure was well received by the press and put into regular rotation at college and commercial radio stations, prompting Stringfellow and Auer to quickly assemble a full band. Adding Mike Musberger on drums and Rick Roberts on bass, the Posies made their live debut in May 1988, two weeks after the release of Failure. The album was subsequently reissued by the Seattle-based independent label, Pop Llama. An expanded version of Failure with eight bonus tracks was reissued by Omnivore Recordings in 2014.

Following a series of dates with The Replacements, Hoodoo Gurus, and They Might Be Giants, among others, the Posies were signed by DGC, a Geffen Records imprint. Dear 23 was released on DGC in September 1990, with the album's lead single "Golden Blunders" appearing in the Top 10 on the college radio charts.

The band's next record, Frosting on the Beater, was released in 1993 and included the song "Dream All Day", which hit No. 4 on the modern rock charts and No. 17 on mainstream radio. In addition to extensively touring the United States, the Posies toured internationally and developed large followings in Europe, Australia, Japan, and elsewhere. Their final record for DGC, Amazing Disgrace, was released in 1996.

The Posies broke up in 1998, but reformed in 2000 for an acoustic tour and have since recorded three more albums, Every Kind of Light in 2005, Blood/Candy in 2010 and Solid States in 2016. Jon Auer and drummer Frankie Siragusa told radio station KUOW that they had left the band in August 2021 as they learned of allegations from 3 former girlfriends (Holly Munoz Nixon, Kristine Chambers, and Kristi Houk) that Stringfellow had been abusive.

=== Big Star ===
In 1993, Stringfellow and Auer were recruited to join Alex Chilton and Jody Stephens for a Big Star reunion; Stringfellow and Auer performed and recorded as members of Big Star until Alex Chilton's death in 2010. They both reunited with Big Star's Jody Stephens for at least one of the ongoing series of "Big Star's Third" concerts, in November 2014.

=== R.E.M. ===
In 1997 Stringfellow began a long association with R.E.M.:

The first thing that happened was Peter [Buck] kept calling me and saying, "Hey, do you want to play some music?" I said, "Sure. I have to go on tour for a couple of months, but when I get back that would be great." A few months later I called him because Stephanie [Buck, Peter's wife] had mentioned something to me about playing bass on some demos. It kind of seemed more like a Minus 5 project at that point. Then he told me, "Actually, we're doing an R.E.M. tour for about a year and we need somebody to play guitar and keyboards, so we think you should audition." Then a week later he calls and says, "Well, actually we cancelled the tour, but we still want you to audition." Finally it was, "If you just want to come down to San Francisco in about a month, you have the gig. You don't have to audition.

Stringfellow performed with the band on world tours in 1999, 2003, 2004, and 2005, and appears on several R.E.M. records, including the Man on the Moon soundtrack, Reveal, and Around the Sun.

=== Side projects ===
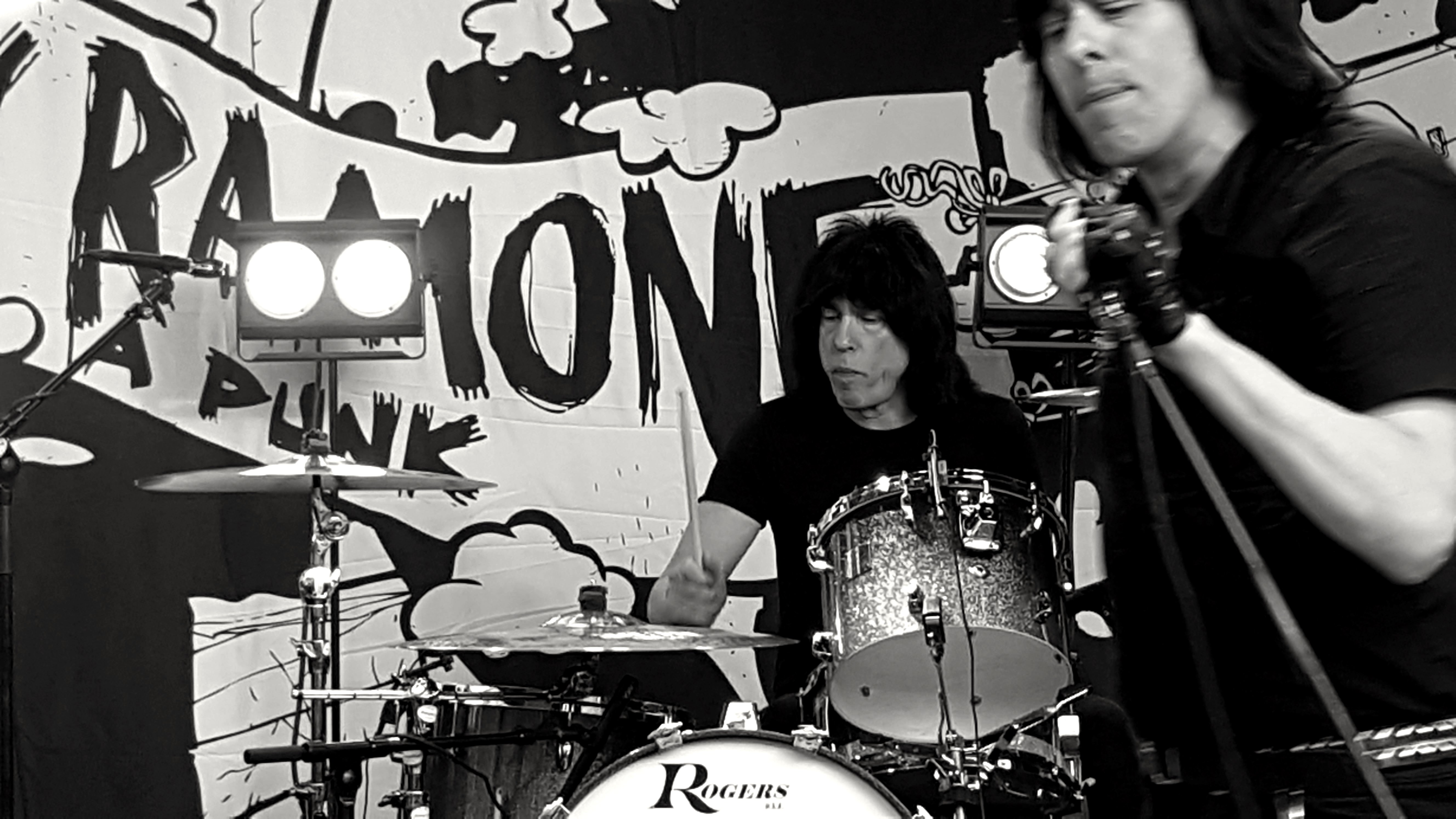
Stringfellow with Marky Ramone, 2016

Although the Posies were Stringfellow's main project during much of the 1980s and 1990s, he also performed and recorded with Sky Cries Mary (a band he founded with Auer in 1989), Lagwagon, Saltine, White Flag, and The Minus Five.

Stringfellow co-wrote and recorded several songs with Scott Miller's band The Loud Family in the mid-1990s, appearing as a guest guitarist and vocalist on their albums The Tape of Only Linda (1994) and Interbabe Concern (1996). He would later produce and perform on Miller's posthumous Game Theory album Supercalifragile (2016).

In 2003, Stringfellow and Auer released Private Sides, a six-song split EP on Arena Rock Recording Co./Rykodisc. As a sideman, Stringfellow has worked with Brendan Benson, Cali, Snow Patrol, and others. Beyond North America and Europe, Stringfellow has also collaborated with Senegal band Waflash.

In 2007, he formed The Disciplines with members of the Norwegian pop band Briskeby. The Disciplines released two records, Smoking Kills in 2009 and Virgins of Menace in 2011.

In March 2015 he announced a country album with Holly Muñoz.The album was a response to Willie Nelson's 1975 album Red Headed Stranger. The Boston Globe commented that it was a " fascinating left-field listen" noting "the gorgeous back-and-forth dueting of Stringfellow and Munoz". Willie Nelson's daughter Amy Nelson also called the album "amazing" on her Instagram feed and thanked them on behalf of the Nelson family.

=== Solo recordings ===
Stringfellow has released four solo albums: This Sounds Like Goodbye (1997, on the Hidden Agenda label), Touched (2001, on Manifesto Records), Soft Commands (2004, on Yep Roc Records), and Danzig in the Moonlight (2012). Released on Lojinx (Europe), Spark & Shine (US) and Target Earth (Japan), Danzig in the Moonlight featured Charity Rose Thielen and Margaret Cho. In 2008, he also released an EP of cover songs, The Sellout Cover Sessions Vol. 1. He has toured extensively in support of each of the albums.

=== Production work ===
Since 2005, Stringfellow has been increasingly involved with production in his studio in Bothell, and has composed film music and string arrangements. He has produced albums for Damien Jurado, The Long Winters, and Carice van Houten.

In 2016, he produced and performed on the final Game Theory studio album, Supercalifragile (2017), a collaborative project that completed the unfinished album Scott Miller had been working on at the time of his death.

Stringfellow has composed soundtracks for short films such as The Kitchen Party and Bunker.

== Personal life ==
Stringfellow is married to Dominique Sassi Stringfellow; they have a daughter. October 16, 2025, Stringfellow announced on social media he had been diagnosed with cancer. Though he didn't state the type of cancer, he said his life expectancy could be ten to fifteen years. He was previously married to The Fastbacks' bass player Kim Warnick.

== Sexual misconduct allegations ==
Allegations of sexual misconduct against Stringfellow by three former girlfriends from 2015 to 2018 (Holly Muñoz, Kristine Chambers, and Kristi Houk) were made public in an October 2021 article by Seattle public radio station KUOW. Stringfellow denied the allegations.

Ken Stringfellow and his wife Dominique Stringfellow published a joint statement to the station:

As a family, we view sexual assault as a very serious issue. As an ethically non-monogamous married couple, we are particularly attuned to the importance of consent and communication in relationships. Over the years, Ken has had consensual and respectful sexual relationships with other women, including the women making the allegations. Our commitment to each other made room for him to do that. While we categorically deny these allegations, we respect these women and do not intend to speak negatively about them.

Stringfellow added:

I would never want to harm anyone with whom I have a relationship – sexual or otherwise. Consent has been the foundation of every sexual relationship I've had, and violence has never been a part of any of those relationships. It simply is not who I am as a person who respects women.

Jon Auer from The Posies quit the band in August after speaking for nine hours with Kristine Chambers, who had made allegations, and informed Stringfellow that he no longer planned to work with him. Drummer Frankie Siragusa also resigned from the band via his Facebook page. Following the publication of the allegations, Jody Stephens, lone surviving member of Big Star, published a statement and removed Stringfellow from forthcoming tribute performances.

In January 2025, Dominique Stringfellow appeared on Episode 289 of the Lydian Spin podcast where she presented a series of contradictory facts regarding the allegations.

== Selected discography ==
=== Solo ===
- This Sounds Like Goodbye (1997)
- Touched (2001)
- Soft Commands (2004)
- The Sellout Cover Sessions Vol. 1 (2008)
- Danzig in the Moonlight (2012)
- I Never Said I'd Make It Easy: A Ken Stringfellow Collection (2014, initial Australian release)
- Circuit Breaker (2024)

=== with The Posies ===
- Failure (1988)
- Dear 23 (1990)
- Frosting on the Beater (1993)
- Amazing Disgrace (1996)
- Success (1998)
- In Case You Didn't Feel Like Plugging In (2000)
- Alive Before the Iceberg (2000)
- At Least, At Last (Box Set) (2000)
- Dream All Day: The Best of the Posies (2000)
- Nice Cheekbones and a Ph.D. (2001)
- Every Kind of Light (2005)
- Blood/Candy (2010)
- Solid States (2016)

=== with Big Star ===
- Columbia: Live at Missouri University 4/25/93 (1993)
- Big Star Story (2003)
- In Space (2005)

=== Other ===
==== with R.E.M. ====
- Man on the Moon soundtrack (1999)
- Reveal (2001)
- In Time: The Best of R.E.M. 1988-2003 (2003)
- Perfect Square (2004)
- Around the Sun (2004)
- R.E.M. Live (2007)

==== with The Disciplines ====
- Smoking Kills (2009)
- Virgins of Menace (2011)

==== with Jon Auer ====
- Private Sides (2003)

==== with Sky Cries Mary ====
- Until the Grinders Cease (1989)
- Don't Eat the Dirt (1990)

==== with The Loud Family ====
- The Tape of Only Linda (1994)
- Interbabe Concern (1996)

==== with The Minus 5 ====
- Old Liquidator (1995)
- Let the War Against Music Begin (2001)
- Down with Wilco (2003)

==== with Lagwagon ====
- Double Plaidinum (Fat Wreck Chords, 1997)

==== with Chariot ====
- I Am Ben Hur (1998)

==== with The Orange Humble Band ====
- Assorted Creams (1998)
- Humblin' (Across America) (2001)
- Depressing Beauty (2015)

==== with Saltine ====
- Find Yourself Alone (1999)
- Reveal Love (1999)

==== with Bootsy Holler (as "Twin Princess") ====
- The Complete Recordings (2000)

==== with White Flag ====
- On the Way Down (1999)
- Eternally Undone (2001)
- History Is Fiction (2002)
- Piangi Con Me (2006)

==== with Holly Muñoz (as Ken and Holly) ====
- The Record: A Country Concept Album (2015)

==== with Big Fresh ====
- "The Voices", on Sweeps EP (2018)

==== with Sunbourne Rd ====
- "Hollywood Breakdown", on Rembetika digital EP (2021)
