= The Posies =

American band

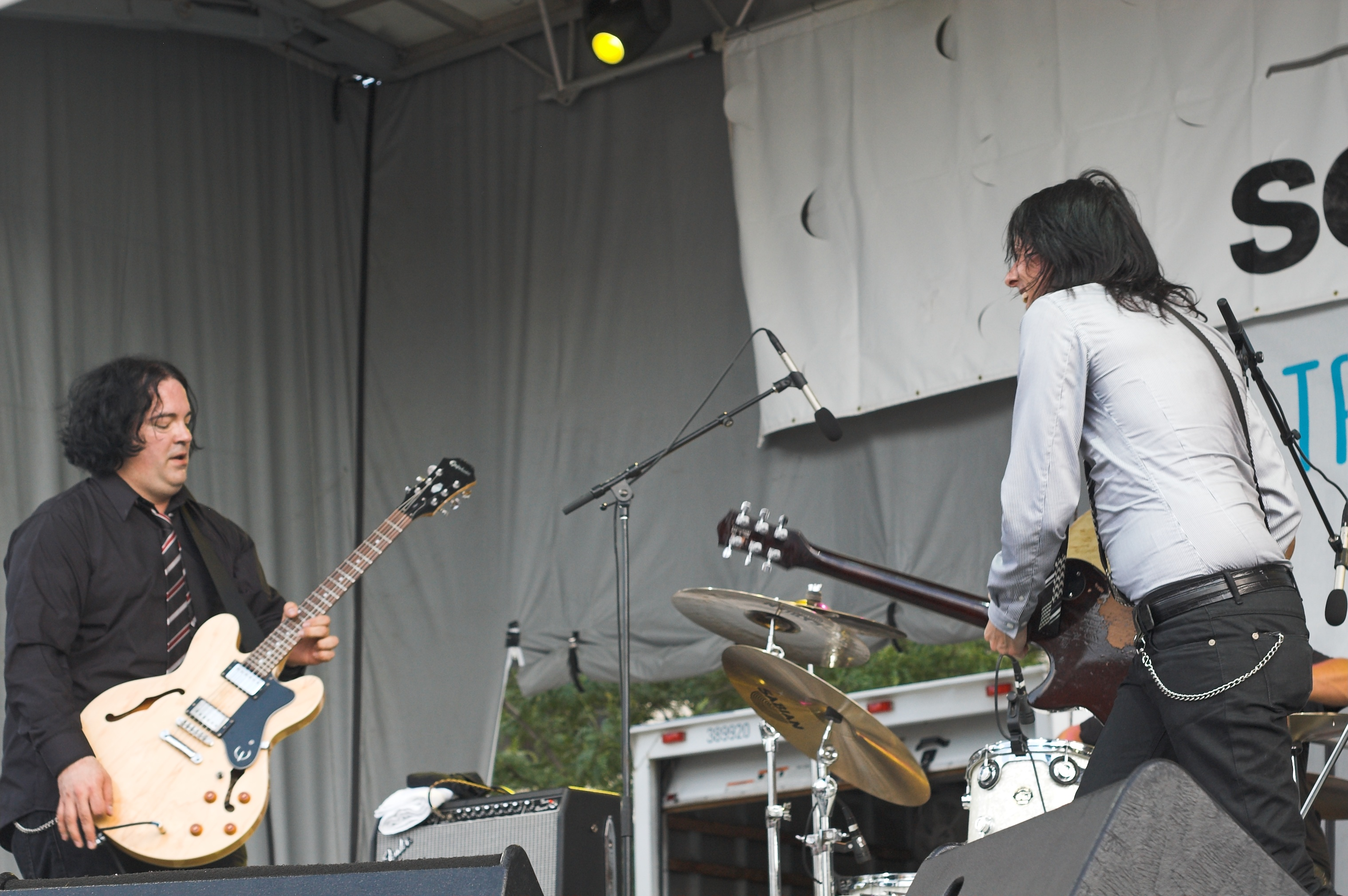
- The Posies perform in Chicago, Illinois in June 2009.

Background information
- Origin: Bellingham, Washington, United States
- Genres: Alternative rock; power pop
- Years active: 1986–2021
- Labels: DGC, Rykodisc, PopLlama, Houston Party, Not Lame, Casa Recording Co., Lojinx
- Past members: Jon Auer; Ken Stringfellow; Arthur "Rick" Roberts; Mike Musburger; Dave Fox; Joe Skyward; Brian Young; Darius Minwalla; Matt Harris; Frankie Siragusa
- Website: Official website

The Posies were an American rock band. The band was formed in 1986 in Bellingham, Washington, United States, by primary songwriters Jon Auer and Ken Stringfellow.

Their music has its origins in Merseybeat and the Hollies. They are influenced by Hüsker Dü, XTC, Elvis Costello and Squeeze.

The band split up in October 2021, following several allegations of sexual misconduct made against bandmember Ken Stringfellow.

== History ==
=== Early years (1986–1988) ===
Core members Jon Auer and Ken Stringfellow, who met as students at Sehome High School in Bellingham, Washington, began writing songs together in late 1986 while Stringfellow was in school at the University of Washington. Their first public performance came as an acoustic duo in 1987 while Stringfellow was home in Bellingham. They recorded twelve songs in Auer's family's home studio. Though intended as demos to attract other members and form a full band, the recordings became the Posies' first self-released album, Failure.

Mike Musburger and Arthur "Rick" Roberts joined soon after, allowing the band to play its first live shows in Seattle and Bellingham. The four members moved into a house in the University District of Seattle, where they developed many of the songs that would appear on later albums. Failure was released on vinyl near the end of 1988 on local indie label PopLlama with one song dropped.

=== Major label years (1989–1997) ===
In late 1989 the band signed to new Geffen Records imprint DGC Records. They chose John Leckie to produce their first album for the label and Dear 23 was released in August 1990. "Golden Blunders" reached No. 17 on the U.S. Modern Rock charts. Ringo Starr covered the song for his 1992 album Time Takes Time.

In early 1992, they began recording their third album with Don Fleming. After completing what they thought was their new album with the title Eclipse, Geffen sent them back to the studio in the latter part of the year to record a few "hits". Dave Fox joined to play bass for the last of the "Hit Sessions" and the name then changed to Frosting On The Beater and was released in April 1993. Leadoff track "Dream All Day" enjoyed some success on U.S. MTV and alternative radio, becoming their biggest hit (No. 4 on the Modern Rock Tracks chart), leading the band to an extensive tour of the U.S., Europe, and Japan. Fox left the band in 1994 to join the Seattle band Flop. Amazing Disgrace was released in May 1996.

The Posies performed with Burt Bacharach on a recording of his song "What the World Needs Now Is Love", which was featured in the 1997 movie Austin Powers: International Man of Mystery.

=== Return to indie label, compilation albums and solo projects (1997–2001) ===
In late 1997, they came back together to play a small number of live shows. The band returned to the studio with the intent of writing their last chapter by re-recording a dozen unused older songs. Success was released in February 1998, again on the local PopLlama label. A tour followed, including a return to Europe, during which the live album Alive Before the Iceberg was recorded.

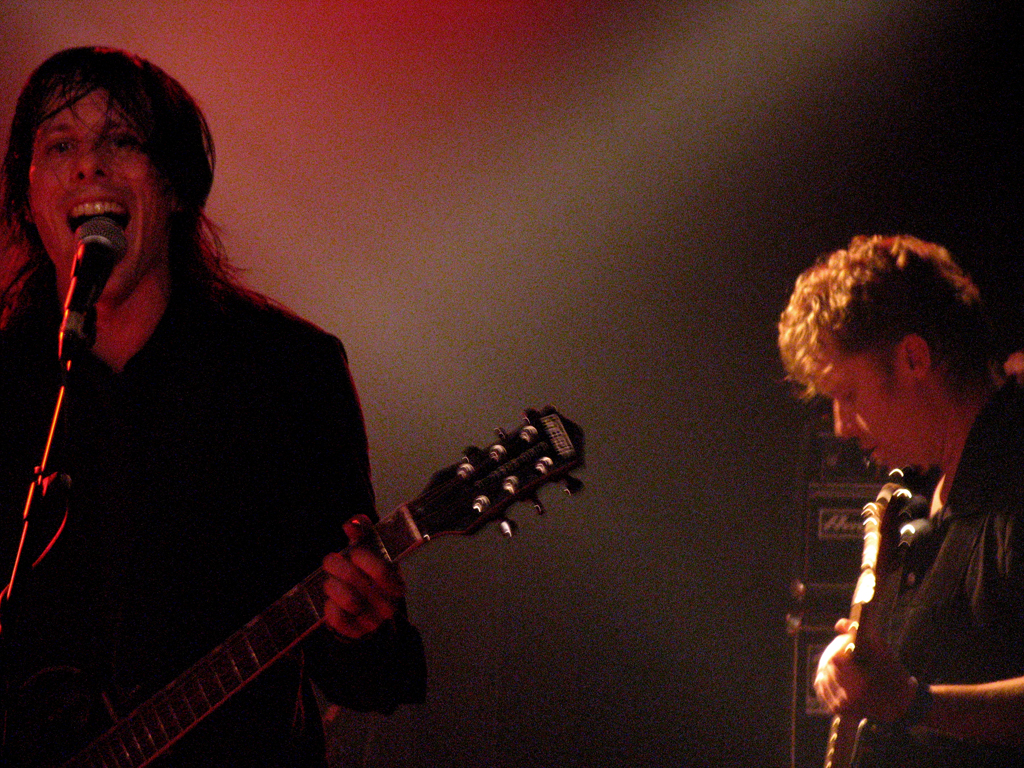
The Posies performing at the Apolo in Barcelona in October 2008.

The band recorded an album together late in 1999, but Stringfellow later decided to break up the band and re-recorded the album with the help of studio musicians; it was to be released in September 2001. Meanwhile, Auer formed a band of his own, released a pair of EPs, and began work on a full-length album, which was released in 2006 as Songs from the Year of Our Demise.

Auer and Stringfellow reunited in early 2000 for a one-off acoustic show in Seattle, which was recorded and released as In Case You Didn't Feel Like Plugging In. Later that year they toured the U.S., Europe, and Japan. Upon returning from the tour, they filled 2001 with a mix of solo work and a handful of live Posies shows played in support of the Nice Cheekbones and a Ph.D. EP, which was recorded the previous year.

Also released in 2000 was a four-CD box set composed almost entirely of unreleased demos, outtakes, and live tracks from throughout the Posies' career, At Least, At Last. The same year, DGC Records released Dream All Day: The Best of the Posies, a compilation with songs from the band's major label years and some B-sides and covers.

=== Comeback and Every Kind of Light (2001–2009) ===
After playing drums in Auer's band, Darius Minwalla took over on drums for the Posies in early 2001. That summer, Matt Harris of Oranger replaced Auer on bass. They wrote and recorded new songs for Every Kind of Light, which was released in June 2005. A tour of the United States and Europe lasted through the end of the year. A brief Japanese tour was scheduled for the summer of 2006. In 2008 Stringfellow and Auer undertook a Posies 20th anniversary tour, playing several shows as a duo in the U.S. and Europe.

From 2008 to 2011, Stringfellow was vocalist in the band the Disciplines, the rest of whose line-up are previous members of the Norwegian band Briskeby. The Disciplines joined R.E.M. on their European tour in 2008 as a warm-up, and their song "Yours For Taking" was included on a CD with songs selected by R.E.M. for the March 2008 issue of Q magazine.

=== Blood/Candy and Solid States (2010–2017) ===
The band released their seventh studio album Blood/Candy on September 28, 2010. The album was recorded and mixed in Spain and their hometown of Seattle, with stops in Ecuador, Canada, Paris and Los Angeles. The album release was followed by an extensive European tour in late 2010.

The reformed Big Star, which featured Auer and Stringfellow alongside musicians Jody Stephens and Alex Chilton, came to an end in March 2010 when Chilton died following a heart attack. In late 2013, the Posies played several shows, performing Amazing Disgrace in its entirety with the line-up from that era. In August 2014 the band reunited again, but with Darius Minwalla on drums and Joe Skyward on bass. During this time both Minwalla amd Skyward died.

On March 3, 2016, the song "Squirrel vs. Snake" was released as a teaser for their forthcoming eighth album, and the band embarked on an extensive month-long European tour on March 29. The album Solid States was released on April 29 by British indie label Lojinx in Europe; the American release on My Music Empire followed on May 20. Drummer Frankie Siragusa, who also contributed to the engineering and mixing of the album, joined the band on tour, where they performed as a trio.

=== Reunion of Frosting on the Beater lineup (2018–2021) ===
In 2018, The Posies reunited with the Frosting on the Beater lineup, with drummer Mike Musburger and bassist Dave Fox returning, for a tour of North America and Europe.

In July 2019 interview with Houston Chronicle, Stringfellow revealed that the Posies had been working on new material.

=== Ken Stringfellow sexual misconduct allegations ===
Allegations of sexual misconduct against Stringfellow by three former girlfriends from 2015 to 2018 (Holly Muñoz, Kristine Chambers and Kristi Houk) were made public in an October 2021 article by Seattle public radio station KUOW. Stringfellow denied the allegations in a joint statement with his wife Dominique Stringfellow to the station. Auer quit the band in August 2021 after speaking with Kristine Chambers who had accused Stringfellow, and informed Stringfellow that he no longer planned to work with him. Siragusa also resigned from the band via his Facebook page. Following the publication of the allegations, Jody Stephens, lone surviving member of Big Star, published a statement and removed Stringfellow from forthcoming tribute performances.

== Musical style and influences ==
The band has been compared to the Hollies due to their vocal harmonies and Big Star due to their songwriting. Both Auer and Stringfellow have been active in producing other artists in between Posies and solo projects.

== Members ==
Final lineup

- Jon Auer – guitar, keyboards, bass, vocals (1986–2021)
- Ken Stringfellow – guitar, bass, keyboards, vocals (1986–2021)
- Frankie Siragusa – drums (2015–2018, 2019–2021)

Past

- Mike Musburger – drums (1988–1994; 2018)
- Rick Roberts (b. Arthur Roberts) – bass (1988–1992)
- Dave Fox – bass (1992–1994; 2018–2019)
- Joe Skyward (b. Joe Howard) – bass (1994–2001; 2013–2014; died 2016)
- Brian Young – drums (1994–1998)
- Darius "Take One" Minwalla – drums (2001–2014; died 2015)
- Matt Harris – bass, guitar (2001–2012; died 2021)

== Discography ==
=== Studio albums ===
List of albums, with selected details and chart positions
Title	Details	Peak chart positions		
Title	Details	AUS	NLD	SWE
Failure	Released: 1988; Label: PopLlama	—	—	—
Dear 23	Released: 1990; Label: DGC	—	—	—
Frosting on the Beater	Released: 1993; Label: DGC	—	—	—
Amazing Disgrace	Released: 1996; Label: DGC	81	72	23
Success	Released: 1998; Label: PopLlama	—	—	—
Every Kind of Light	Released: 2005; Label: Rykodisc	—	—	—
Blood/Candy	Released: 2010; Label: Rykodisc	—	—	—
Solid States	Released: 2016; Label: Lojinx/My Music Empire	—	—	—

=== Singles and EPs ===
- "Golden Blunders" (DGC Records, 1990)
- "Suddenly Mary" (DGC Records, 1991)
- "Feel"/"I Am the Cosmos" (PopLlama Records, 1992)
- "Dream All Day" (DGC Records, 1993)
- "Solar Sister" (DGC Records, 1993)
- "Flavor of the Month" (DGC Records, 1993)
- This Is Not The Posies (Elefant Records, 1993)
- "Definite Door" (DGC Records, 1994)
- "Going, Going, Gone" (DGC Records, 1994)
- "Ontario" (DGC Records, 1996)
- "Please Return It" (DGC Records, 1996)
- "Everybody Is a Fucking Liar" (DGC Records, 1996)
- "Start a Life" (PopLlama Records, 1998)
- Nice Cheekbones and a Ph.D. (Houston Party Records, 2001)
- "Second Time Around" (Rykodisc, 2005)
- "Conversations" (Rykodisc, 2005)
- "The Glitter Prize" (Rykodisc, 2010)
- "Licenses to Hide" (Rykodisc, 2010)
- The Posies Play Big Star (SON Estrella Galicia, 2017)

=== Compilation albums ===
- Dream All Day: The Best of the Posies (DGC Records, 2000)
- At Least, At Last (box set, Not Lame Recordings, 2003)

=== Live albums ===
- Alive Before the Iceberg (Houston Party Records, 2000)
- In Case You Didn't Feel Like Plugging In (Casa Recording Co., 2000)

=== Compilation and soundtrack contributions ===
- "Smash It Up" on Another Damned Seattle Compilation (Dashboard Hula Girl Records, 1990).
- "Going, Going, Gone" on the Reality Bites Original Motion Picture Soundtrack (RCA, 1993).
- "Open Every Window" on DGC Rarities, Vol. 1 (DGC Records, 1994).
- "Every Christian Lion Hearted Man Will Show You" on Melody Fair, The Bee Gees tribute album (Eggbert Records, 1994).
- "Coming Right Along" on Basketball Diaries Original Motion Picture Soundtrack (Island Records, 1995).
- "King Midas In Reverse" on Sing Hollies in Reverse (Eggbert Records, 1995).
- "Throwaway (Live)" on Hype! The Motion Picture Soundtrack (Sub Pop, 1996).
- "Richie Dagger's Crime" on A Small Circle of Friends: A Germs Tribute Album (Grass Records, 1996)
- "Christmas" on Just Say Noël (Geffen Records, 1996)
- "Limitless Expressions" on Home Alive - The Art of Self Defense (Epic Records, 1996)
- "Tomorrow We Are Not Alone" on Together We Are Not Alone (Japan Relief Compilation) (Thistime Records, 2011)

=== Singles chart positions ===
Year	Title	Chart positions				Album
Year	Title	US Hot 100	US Alt	US Mainstream Rock	UK	Album
1990	"Golden Blunders"	-	17	-	-	Dear 23
1993	"Dream All Day"	-	4	17	-	Frosting On the Beater
1994	"Definite Door"	-	-	-	67	Frosting On the Beater
