= Jon Auer =

American musician

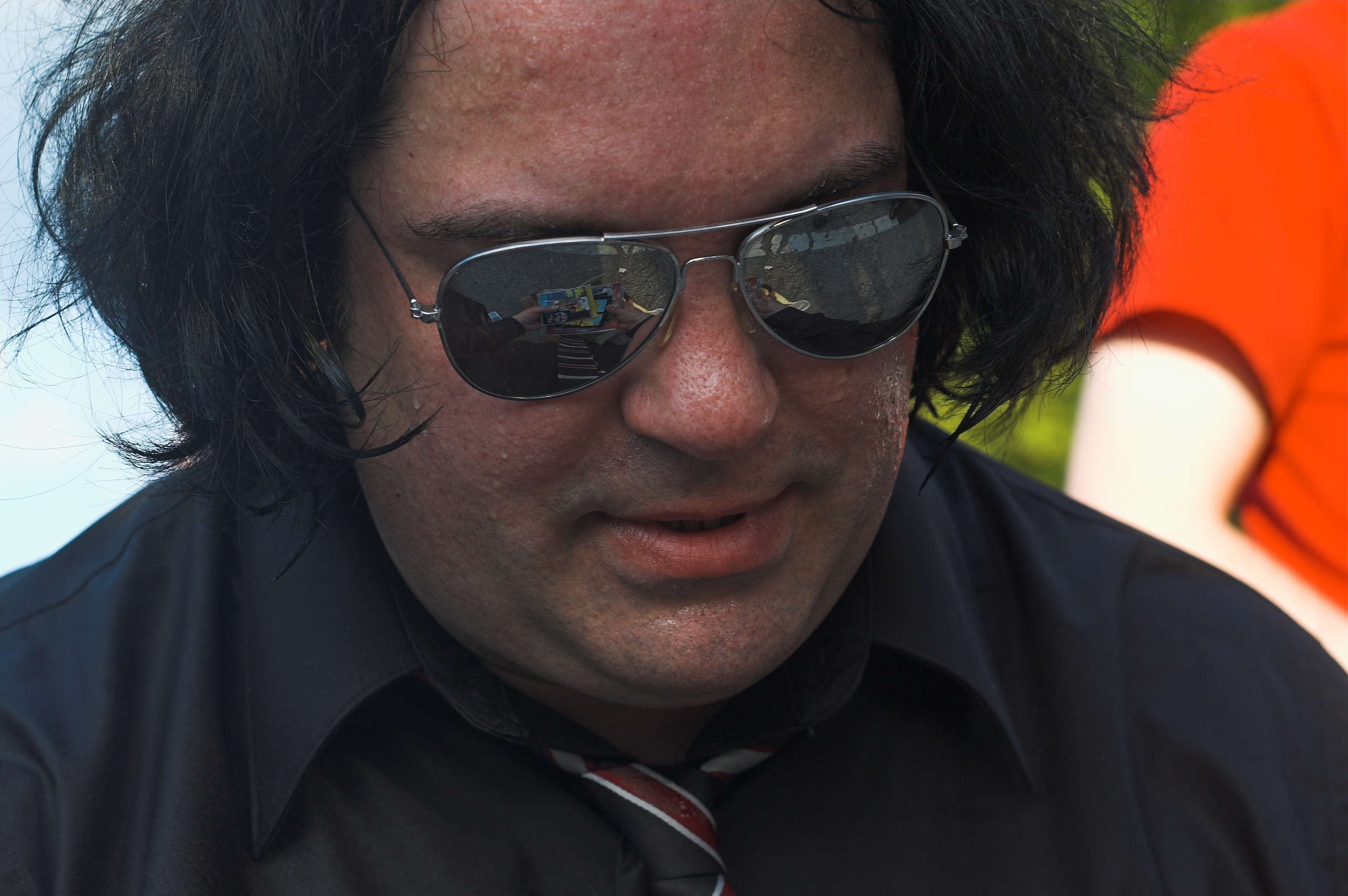
- Auer in Chicago, IL in January 2009

Background information
- Born: September 29, 1969 (age 56)
- Genres: Power pop, alternative rock, grunge
- Occupation: Musician
- Instruments: Guitar, vocals, keyboards, bass, drums
- Label: Pattern25
- Formerly of: The Posies, Big Star, The Minus 5
- Website: myspace.com/jonauermusic

Jonathan Paul Auer (born September 29, 1969) is an American musician who co-founded the power pop band The Posies, along with Ken Stringfellow. Auer and Stringfellow also participated in the rejuvenated Big Star and in 2003 released Private Sides, a six-song split EP (Arena Rock Recording Co./Rykodisc). Auer played guitar on the 2004 William Shatner record Has Been which was produced and arranged by Ben Folds.

Auer was a founding member of Sky Cries Mary, a member of The Squirrels, Lucky Me, Jean Jacket Shotgun and Chariot. As a solo artist, his credentials include: an EP, 6^{1_{/2}} and a full-length record on the label Pattern25 called Songs from the Year of Our Demise. As a record producer, he has worked with bands such as You Am I, Monostereo, Cheap Star, Love Battery, Redd Kross, Truly, The Melismatics, and Tad.

== Personal life ==
Auer grew up in Bellingham, Washington. His father was a university professor who also played music. They built a recording studio at home, which Jon used as a teenager. Auer is three times divorced. With his previous wife, musician Tiz Aramini, he has released an album under the name Dynamo Royale.
