= Mazzy Star discography =

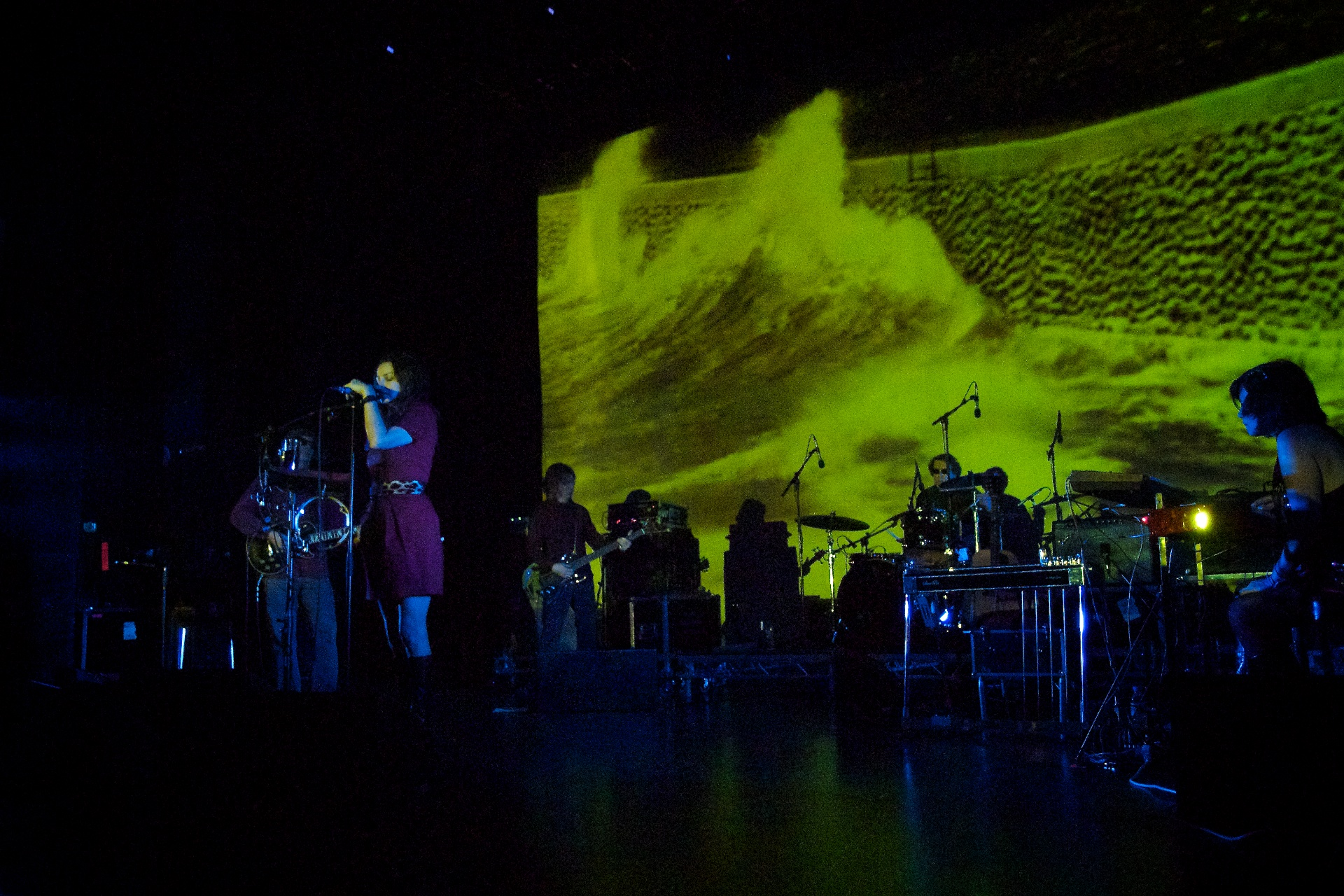
- Mazzy Star in London 2012. From left to right: David Roback, Hope Sandoval, Colm Ó Cíosóig, Keith Mitchell (drums), Suki Ewers (keyboards)
- Studio albums: 4
- Extended plays: 2
- Singles: 12
- Music videos: 8

The discography of American alternative rock band Mazzy Star consists of four studio albums, two EPs, twelve singles and eight music videos. The band was formed in 1989 by vocalist Hope Sandoval and guitarist David Roback, after the disbandment of Roback's previous band with vocalist Kendra Smith, Opal. Mazzy Star's debut studio album, She Hangs Brightly, was released by Rough Trade Records in 1990, and eventually spawned two singles: "Blue Flower" in 1990 and "Halah" in 1995.

So Tonight That I Might See was issued through Capitol Records in 1993. Lead single "Five String Serenade" was followed by "Fade into You", which remains their biggest hit to date, and their only single to enter the Billboard Hot 100. The song also charted in Australia, Canada and the UK. The album was certified platinum by the RIAA for shipments of over a million units, and was certified silver by the British Phonographic Industry for sales in excess of 60,000 copies in the United Kingdom. "She's My Baby" was released as a promotional single. Although never officially released, "Into Dust" appeared on several national record charts after it featured in various advertising campaigns: first by Virgin Media in 2009, and later on the "Dust to Dust" trailer for Gears of War 3 (2011).

Their third studio album, Among My Swan, was released by Capitol in 1996. "Flowers in December" was issued as its only official single, followed by the double A-sided promotional release "I've Been Let Down" and "Roseblood". After a fifteen year absence, the band released the double A-sided single "Common Burn" / "Lay Myself Down" in 2011. This was followed by their fourth studio album, Seasons of Your Day, in 2013, which reached a career-high peak of No. 24 on the UK Albums Chart. In 2014, non-album single "I'm Less Here" was issued as part of Record Store Day. Their most recent release is the 2018 EP Still.

== Studio albums ==
List of albums, with selected chart positions and certifications
Title	Album details	Peak chart positions										Sales	Certifications
Title	Album details	US	AUS	BEL (FL)	BEL (WA)	DEN	FRA	GER	IRE	NZ	UK	Sales	Certifications
She Hangs Brightly	Released: May 21, 1990; Label: Rough Trade; Format: CD, LP, CS	—	197	—	—	—	—	—	—	—	—	UK: 70,000	
So Tonight That I Might See	Released: October 5, 1993; Label: Capitol; Format: CD, LP, CS	36	154	109	—	—	—	—	84	—	68		RIAA: Platinum; RMNZ: Platinum; BPI: Gold
Among My Swan	Released: October 29, 1996; Label: Capitol; Format: CD, LP, CS	68	74	—	—	—	—	—	—	41	57	US: 214,000	BPI: Silver
Seasons of Your Day	Released: September 24, 2013; Label: Rhymes of an Hour; Format: CD, LP, DL	42	—	44	57	33	116	85	64	—	24		
"—" denotes a release that did not chart or was not released in that territory.

== Live albums ==
List of live-album with additional information
Title	Details
Ghost Highway	Released: November 13, 2020; Label: Easy Action; Format: LP, CD

== EPs ==
List of EPs with additional information
Title	Details	Peak chart positions
Title	Details	US Indie
Deep Cuts (Note: Deep Cuts consists of three b-sides from the "Fade into You" single ("Bells Ring (acoustic version)", "I'm Gonna Bake My Biscuit" and "Under My Car") and one "Flowers in December" b-side ("Hair and Skin"). It was released without the knowledge of – or any involvement from – Mazzy Star, whose name is misspelled as 'Mazzy Starr' on the cover.)	Released: June 16, 2009; Label: Capitol; Format: DL	—
Still	Released: June 1, 2018; Label: Rhymes of an Hour; Format: LP, DL	27
"—" denotes a release that did not chart.

== Singles ==
Title	Year	Peak chart positions									Certifications	Album
Title	Year	US	US Alt.	US Pop	US Radio	US Sales	AUS	CAN	UK	WW (Note: The Billboard Global 200 was created in September 2020, and "Fade into You" first charted in October 2025.)	Certifications	Album
"Blue Flower"	1990	—	29	—	—	—	—	—	—	—		She Hangs Brightly
"Five String Serenade" (Note: "Five String Serenade" was released in limited quantities on 7" vinyl exclusively in the United Kingdom as part of the Rough Trade Singles Club in June 1993.)	1993	—	—	—	—	—	—	—	—	—		So Tonight That I Might See
"Fade into You"	1994	44	3	19	38	—	72	83	48	106	BPI: Platinum; RMNZ: 4× Platinum	So Tonight That I Might See
"Halah"/"She's My Baby"	1995	—	19	—	—	—	190	—	—	—		She Hangs Brightly/So Tonight That I Might See
"Flowers in December"	1996	—	—	—	—	—	—	—	40	—		Among My Swan
"Common Burn" / "Lay Myself Down"	2011	—	—	—	—	—	—	—	—	—		Seasons of Your Day
"California"	2013	—	—	—	—	—	—	—	—	—		Seasons of Your Day
"Seasons of Your Day" / "Sparrow" (Note: A double a-sided 7" vinyl single for "Seasons of Your Day" and "Sparrow" was released by Rough Trade Records on November 4, 2013. This vinyl was limited to 300 copies worldwide.)	2013	—	—	—	—	—	—	—	—	—		Seasons of Your Day
"I'm Less Here"	2014	—	—	—	—	15	—	—	—	—		Non-album single
"—" denotes a release that did not chart or was not released in that territory.

=== Promotional singles ===
List of promotional singles, showing year released and album name
Title	Year	Album
"She's My Baby" (Note: Three different promotional singles were issued by Capitol Records for "She's My Baby": A Jukebox-style 7" vinyl was issued in 1993 with "Fade into You" on side B.; A blue-colored 7" vinyl featuring handwritten sleeve notes was released in 1994, with "Halah" on side B.; A promotional CD single containing an exclusive radio edit of the song was sent to radio stations in 1994.)	1993	So Tonight That I Might See
"I've Been Let Down" / "Roseblood" (Note: Limited edition 7" single, labelled "For Jukeboxes Only".)	1996	Among My Swan
"In the Kingdom" (Note: Limited edition promotional CD single, containing an exclusive radio edit of the song.)	2014	Seasons of Your Day

=== Other charted songs ===
List of songs, with selected chart positions, showing year released and album name
Single	Year	Peak chart positions			Certifications	Album
Single	Year	US Rock	IRE	UK	Certifications	Album
"Into Dust"	2011	26	40	47	BPI: Silver	So Tonight That I Might See

== Music videos ==
List of music videos, showing year released and directors
Title	Year	Director(s)
"Halah"	1990	Kevin Kerslake
"Fade into You" (first version)	1993	Kevin Kerslake
"Fade into You" (second version)	1994	Merlyn Rosenberg
"Flowers in December"	1996	Kevin Kerslake
"I've Been Let Down"	1997	Mike Costanza
"California"	2013	Mazzy Star
"I'm Less Here"	2014	Mazzy Star
"Quiet, the Winter Harbor"	2018	Mazzy Star

"Disappear" (years unknown) Mike Costanza

"She's My Baby" (years unknown) (director unknown)
