= Still (Mazzy Star EP) =

EP by Mazzy Star
- Released: June 1, 2018
- Recorded: 1993–2017
- Genre: Psychedelic rock
- Length: 18:25
- Label: Rhymes of an Hour
- Producers: Hope Sandoval; David Roback

Mazzy Star chronology
| Seasons of Your Day (2013) | Still (2018) |

Still is an EP by American alternative rock band Mazzy Star, released on June 1, 2018, by the group's own independent record label, Rhymes of an Hour. It was their first release since the 2013 studio album Seasons of Your Day, and was issued in dedication to founding drummer Keith Mitchell, and stage manager Tom Cashen, both of whom died in 2017. The EP contains a mixture of both new and old material, and received generally positive reviews upon release. The band promoted the release with several concerts at the Sydney Opera House. "Quiet, the Winter Harbor" was released as its only single. The EP was the final Mazzy Star release issued before co-founder David Roback died on February 24, 2020.

== Composition and recording ==
Still is Mazzy Star's first major release since Seasons of Your Day in 2013, which had been their first studio album in almost two decades. It is also their first release since the death of founding drummer Keith Mitchell in 2017. The EP contains a mix of both new and older material: "Quiet, the Winter Harbor" was first performed live by the band during a concert in London in 2000, while "That Way Again" has been performed live since 1994. It also contains an alternate version of "So Tonight That I Might See", the title track to the band's 1993 studio album.

== Release and promotion ==
"Quiet, the Winter Harbor" was released as a single in April 2018. Still appeared on streaming services such as Apple Music and Spotify on June 1, in advance of their scheduled appearance at Vivid Live in Sydney. The festival saw the band performing on three consecutive nights at the Sydney Opera House, which were their first Australian concerts ever. It is unknown if they intend to perform further concerts, although vocalist Hope Sandoval has confirmed that the band will release more music "at some point".

== Critical reception ==
Professional ratings
Aggregate scores
| Source | Rating |
|---|---|
| Metacritic | 74/100 |
Review scores
| Source | Rating |
| AllMusic | 3/5 stars |
| Paste | 7.7/10 |
| Pitchfork | 7.1/10 |
| Under the Radar | 7.5/10 stars |

The EP received generally positive reviews. At Metacritic, which assigns a normalized rating out of 100 to reviews from mainstream critics, it received an average score of 74 out of 100, based on 4 publications, indicating "generally favorable" reviews. It also received a score of 6.4 at AnyDecentMusic?.

Tim Sendra of AllMusic called it "classic Mazzy Star", elaborating that the band shows "none of the ravages of time one might expect. They still make beautiful music that weaves a spell that's hard to break, and [Hope] Sandoval and [David] Roback can't seem to shake the effects. After just a few seconds of the first song, around the time Sandoval's voice comes in, the listener will find the old familiar Mazzy Star feeling taking hold once again, just as bewitchingly strong as ever." Similarly, Timothy Michalik of Under the Radar said the EP "brings forth a certain sense of familiarity and comfort for both long time Mazzy Star fans and newcomers alike." He praised "Quiet, the Winter Harbor" as its best song, saying that its "soft, seraphic piano seems to open up an entirely alternate universe for [the band]." BrooklynVegan commended the diversity of material found on the release, explaining: "Since it's just four songs, it's nice that each one is noticeably different from the rest, and each one really stands on its own as a powerful song. With this short EP alone, Mazzy Star remind you that they could never be pigeon-holed."

A writer for Paste commented: "While the sound hasn't changed much, neither has the impact of the music that they've mastered. 28 years later, Mazzy Star can still create a hell of a mood, their dark romanticism sounding anything but dated." Spectrum Culture gave a negative review, criticizing the length of "So Tonight That I Might See" before summarizing: "Unlike [on] the full-length [albums], where you often find something to help carry the weight of the more challenging tracks, this EP doesn't have anything which a listener can really get excited about."

== Track listing ==
All songs written by Hope Sandoval and David Roback.

| No. | Title | Length |
|---|---|---|
| 1. | "Quiet, the Winter Harbor" | 4:15 |
| 2. | "That Way Again" | 4:13 |
| 3. | "Still" | 2:05 |
| 4. | "So Tonight That I Might See" (Ascension Version) | 7:52 |

== Personnel ==
Credits adapted from the liner notes of the vinyl edition of Still.

Musicians

- Hope Sandoval – vocals, production, engineering, mixing
- David Roback – acoustic guitar, electric guitar, slide guitar, production, engineering, mixing
- Josh Yenne – pedal steel guitar
- Suki Ewers – keyboards, piano, synthesizer
- William Cooper Glenn – violin
- Paul Olguin – bass guitar
- Keith Mitchell – live drums

Technical

- Dale Everingham – engineering
- Erwin Castillo – engineering
- Mark Chalecki – mastering
- Audun Strype – mastering
- Barry Bödeker – artwork
- Frank Gironda – management

== Charts ==
| Chart (2018) | Peak position |
|---|---|
| US Independent Albums (Billboard) | 27 |
