= Fade into You (disambiguation) =

"Fade into You" is a song by Mazzy Star. It may also refer to:

- Fade into You, an episode of the television series The Vampire Diaries
- Fade into You, a song on the 2012 television series Nashville
