= Happy Nightmare Baby =

Studio album by Opal
- Released: 1987
- Genre: Paisley underground
- Length: 41:31
- Label: SST (103)
- Producer: David Roback

Opal chronology
Northern Line (EP) (1985)	Happy Nightmare Baby (1987)	Early Recordings (1989)

Happy Nightmare Baby is the only studio album by the American band Opal, released in 1987 by SST Records in America and Rough Trade Records in England. It was the only album released by the band while together, singer Kendra Smith leaving during the tour to promote it, to be replaced by Hope Sandoval, the band evolving into Mazzy Star.

The album was produced by the band's guitarist and co-songwriter David Roback, who said of the album: "Happy Nightmare Baby was a very electric record. We were very orientated towards playing live at that point. What we’d been doing before that was very acoustic, and then we thought we’d make it very electric."

== Reception ==
Professional ratings
Review scores
Source	Rating
AllMusic	4/5 stars

In a moment of prescience and praise, Music Week reviewer, Dave E. Henderson contemporaneously wrote, "Opal's totally unpredictable growing process may secure their downfall, due to their shaky persona, but either way, this [album] will be a cult item." Ned Raggett, reviewing the album for AllMusic, called it "at once drowsy, psychedelic, entrancing, and possessed of a sinuous spark". It was described by PopMatters in 2009 as a "lost semi-masterpiece". Trouser Press described Smith's singing as "laconic", some of the instrumentation as "self-indulgent nonsense" and the pace as too slow, but viewed the album as "ultimately satisfying". Andrew Earles, in his book Gimme Indie Rock: 500 Essential American Underground Rock Albums 1981-1996 described the album as "Velvet Underground meets T-Rex at the intersection of proto-shoegaze and neo-psychedelia".

== Track listing ==
1. "Rocket Machine" (David Roback) 4:24
2. "Magick Power" (Roback, Kendra Smith) 6:14
3. "Revelation" (Roback) 2:53
4. "A Falling Star" (Roback, Smith) 1:21
5. "She's a Diamond" (Roback, Smith) 4:18
6. "Supernova" (Roback, Smith) 4:17
7. "Siamese Trap" (Roback, Smith) 6:38
8. "Happy Nightmare Baby" (Roback, Smith) 2:52
9. "Soul Giver" (Roback) 8:34
