= Flowers in December =

1996 single by Mazzy Star

Single by Mazzy Star

from the album Among My Swan
- B-side: "Tell Your Honey"; "Hair and Skin"; "Ride It On" (live); "Had a Thought"
- Released: October 21, 1996
- Length: 4:56
- Label: Capitol
- Songwriters: Hope Sandoval; David Roback
- Producers: David Roback; Hope Sandoval (co-production)

Mazzy Star singles chronology
"Halah" (1995)	"Flowers in December" (1996)	"I've Been Let Down" (1996)

"Flowers in December" is a song by American alternative rock band Mazzy Star, released in October 1996 as the lead single from their third studio album, Among My Swan (1996). It was written by Hope Sandoval and David Roback, and produced by Roback. "Flowers in December" reached No. 40 on the UK Singles Chart and remained in the top 100 for two weeks. A music video was filmed to promote the single, directed by Kevin Kerslake.

== Critical reception ==
Upon its release, Music & Media named "Flowers in December" their "single of the week" and commented, "David Roback and Hope Sandoval's dreamy acoustics have become even more poppier with gorgeous melodies, plenty of minor chord changes and a delicate violin whispering in the background." Kristy Barker of Melody Maker picked it as one of the magazine's "single[s] of the week" and stated that it "nearly manage[d]" to "move [her] as much" as Mazzy Star's "Fade into You" and "Blue Flower". She continued, "Strings that sound like sighs back Sandoval's forlorn [voice], but then a great honking mouth organ comes in and spoils it all". She was more positive towards the "Delicatessen-like" "Hair and Skin", noting she "fell in love" with the track, which is "all fuzzy guitars and stop-start minor-chord organ, and Hope, sounding more desolate than ever".

In a review of Among My Swan, Chris Molanphy of CMJ New Music Monthly commented, "...amid Hope Sandoval's wispy voice and David Roback's plinking guitars, there's a brightness trying to emerge. You hear it in the chimes that ring over "Disappear," and in Sandoval's wistful harmonica on "Flowers in December." In a 2013 retrospective on the band's career, Emily Mackay of New Musical Express considered the song "lovely but not the album's best moment".

== Track listings ==
UK CD1 and 7-inch single

1. "Flowers in December" – 4:56
2. "Tell Your Honey" – 4:31
3. "Hair and Skin" – 3:42

UK CD2

1. "Flowers in December" – 4:56
2. "Ride It On" (live) – 3:09
3. "Had a Thought" – 2:24

European maxi-CD single

1. "Flowers in December" – 4:56
2. "Tell Your Honey" – 4:31
3. "Hair and Skin" – 3:42
4. "Ride It On" (live) – 3:09

== Personnel ==
Mazzy Star

- Hope Sandoval – vocals, harmonica, co-production
- David Roback – guitar, production, engineering
- William Cooper – strings, engineering
- Jill Emery – bass
- Keith Mitchell – drums

Additional personnel

- Dale Everingham – engineering
- Eddy Schreyer – mastering
- Andy Caitlan, John Eagle – sleeve photography

== Charts ==
Chart (1996)	Peak position
Europe (Eurochart Hot 100)	61
Scotland Singles (Official Charts)	26
UK Singles (Official Charts)	40
