= The Spoils (song) =

Single by Massive Attack
- B-side: "Come Near Me"
- Released: 29 July 2016
- Genre: Trip hop; electronica
- Length: 5:46
- Label: Virgin EMI
- Songwriters: Grant Marshall; Hope Sandoval; Stew Jackson
- Producers: Grant Marshall; Stew Jackson

Massive Attack singles chronology
""Four Walls" / "Paradise Circus"" (2011)	"The Spoils" (2016)	"Dear Friend" (2016)

"The Spoils" is a single by British group Massive Attack, released on 29 July 2016. The title song features Mazzy Star singer-songwriter Hope Sandoval, in what is her third collaboration with the band, after "Paradise Circus" from the album Heligoland (2010), and the non-album single "Four Walls" (2011). The b-side, "Come Near Me," features British musician Ghostpoet.

A music video for the second song "Come Near Me", directed by Ed Morris and featuring Kosovan actress Arta Dobroshi, was released the same day as the single. The videoclip for "The Spoils", featuring Cate Blanchett and directed by Australian director John Hillcoat, was released on 9 August 2016.

== Track listing ==
No.	Title	Writer(s)	Producer(s)	Length
1.	"The Spoils" (featuring Hope Sandoval)	Grant Marshall; Hope Sandoval; Stew Jackson	Marshall; Jackson	5:46
2.	"Come Near Me" (featuring Ghostpoet)	Marshall; Obaro Ejimiwe; Jackson	Marshall; Jackson	4:55
Total length:				10:41

== Personnel ==
Musicians

- Grant Marshall – composition, production, programming, recording engineer
- Stew Jackson – composition, production, programming, recording engineer, electric and bass guitars, keyboards, synthesizer
- Hope Sandoval – lyricist, vocalist (track 1)
- Ghostpoet – lyricist, vocalist (track 2)
- Elijah Ford – guitar, organ (track 1)
- Dan Jones – composition, string arranger and conductor (track 1)
- Louis Lewis-Smith – banjo (track 2)
- Andy Lowe – double bass (track 1)

Technical

- Iván Bello – assistant recording engineer
- Bruno Ellingham – mixing
- Roberto Morlán Gómez – orchestral recording engineer
- Victor Vazquez – assistant recording engineer
- Tim Young – mastering engineer

== Charts ==
Chart (2016)	Peak; position
France (SNEP)	53
