= I'm Less Here =

Single by Mazzy Star
- Released: April 19, 2014
- Genre: Alternative rock, psychedelic rock, folk
- Length: 4:15
- Label: Rhymes of an Hour
- Songwriters: David Roback, Hope Sandoval
- Producers: Roback, Sandoval

Mazzy Star singles chronology
"Seasons of Your Day" / "Sparrow" (2013)	"I'm Less Here" (2014)

"I'm Less Here" is a stand-alone single released by alternative rock band Mazzy Star for Record Store Day 2014, and was the band's first release of new material since their previous album, Seasons of Your Day. The track had previously been performed live under the name "It Speaks of Distance," with its first known performance dating back to March 1994. The A-side was backed by another previously unreleased song, titled "Things". The day before the single's release, the band posted a music video for the track on their official Vevo account.

== Single release ==
"I'm Less Here" is the first Record Store Day release issued by Mazzy Star. The single was pressed on coke bottle-clear 7" vinyl and was limited to 3,000 copies worldwide. In the United States, "I'm Less Here" was listed as a 'Record Store Day First'; it was exclusive to independent retailers on the day of release, and was made available to other retailers at a later date. The single was released as a digital download worldwide on May 20, 2014.

== Track listing ==
- 7" single (Record Store Day release)
1. "I'm Less Here" - 4:15
2. "Things" - 3:16

== Credits and personnel ==
Musicians

- David Roback — instrumentation, producer, engineer, mixing
- Hope Sandoval — vocals, instrumentation, producer, engineer, mixing
- Colm Ó Cíosóig — instrumentation

Production

- Barry Bödeker — artwork
- Mark Chaleki — mastering
- Frank Gironda — management

Credits adapted from the vinyl liner notes.

== Charts ==
Chart (2014)	Peak position
UK Physical Singles (The Official Charts Company)	39
U.S. Hot Singles Sales (Billboard)	15

== Release history ==
Region	Release date	Record label	Catalog No.	Format
United States	April 19, 2014	Rhymes of an Hour	RHYMES-005	7" vinyl
United Kingdom	April 19, 2014	Rhymes of an Hour	RHYMES-005	7" vinyl
Europe	April 19, 2014	Mr Bongo Records	MRBLP079	7" vinyl
Worldwide	May 20, 2014	Rhymes of an Hour		Digital download
