= Into Dust =

Song by Mazzy Star

from the album So Tonight That I Might See
- Released: October 5, 1993
- Recorded: 1993
- Length: 5:36
- Label: Capitol
- Composer: David Roback
- Lyricist: Hope Sandoval
- Producer: David Roback

"Into Dust" is a song by American duo Mazzy Star that appears as the ninth track on their second album So Tonight That I Might See. The song's arrangement is sparse and features only acoustic guitar and cello as an accompaniment to the vocals.

Although never released as an official single, the song has charted on two occasions on the UK Singles Chart. Fifteen years after the release of the album, the song charted at No. 71 in August 2009 following its appearance on a commercial for Virgin Media. Two years later, the song spent a further four weeks on the chart, reaching a new peak of No. 47, when it was used on the "Dust to Dust" trailer for Gears of War 3. In September 2011, "Into Dust" made its debut appearance on the Irish Singles Chart, where it reached a peak of No. 40.

== Charting positions ==
"Into Dust"
Album version, as it appeared on So Tonight That I Might See

Chart (2009)	Peak position
United Kingdom (OCC)	71
Chart (2011)	Peak position
Ireland (IRMA)	40
United Kingdom (OCC)	47
United States Rock Digital Songs (Billboard)	26

== Certifications ==
Certifications for "Into Dust"
Region	Certification	Certified units/sales
United Kingdom (BPI) Sales since 2005	Silver	200,000^{‡}
^{‡} Sales+streaming figures based on certification alone.

== Covers versions and remixes ==
- A cover by Ashtar Command appeared on The O.C. soundtrack album Music from the OC: Mix 6. This version originally appeared in "The Chrismukk-huh?" (Season 4, Episode 6).
- A trance remix by John O'Callaghan appeared on A State of Trance Episode 327.
- A cover by heavy metal band In This Moment on the album Mother released in 2020.
- A remix by Four Tet titled "Into Dust (Still Falling)" was released on June 17, 2025.

== In popular culture ==
=== In film ===
- The song featured in the 1996 film Foxfire, starring Angelina Jolie.
- It was used, along with Among My Swan's "Take Everything", in the 2004 film In My Father's Den.
- It also featured in the 2007 film Rails & Ties, starring Kevin Bacon.
- It appears in the 2018 film A Million Little Pieces, starring Aaron Taylor-Johnson, Billy Bob Thornton, and Odessa Young.
- It also appears in the 2026 series "Seeing is Believing" Episode 8

=== In television ===
- 666 Park Avenue – "Hero Complex"
- Babylon – "Episode Three"
- The Blacklist – "Nyle Hatcher" (S7E16)
- Bosch – "Dark Sky"
- Canterbury's Law – "Baggage"
- Charmed – "A Knight to Remember"
- The English – "Path of the Dead" (S1E2)
- The Handmaid's Tale – "Mayday" (S3E13)
- Hollyoaks Later
- Hollyoaks
- House "Informed Consent" (S3E3)
- The Last Frontier - "Everything Trying" (S1E10)
- Moonlight – "Fever"
- New Amsterdam – "King of Swords"
- The Night Of - "The beach"
- The O.C – "Pilot", "The Escape", "The Chrismukk-huh?"
- Quantum Leap – "Paging Dr. Song" (S1E10)
- Rectify
- Resident Evil – "The Light" (S1E3)
- Rick and Morty
- Save Me – episode #1.5
- Six – "Danger Close"
- Standoff – "Road Trip"
- Superstore – "Tornado"
- Terminator Zero
- True Detective – "Night Country: Part 4" (S4E4)
- World Shut Your Mouth

=== In games ===
- The track was used in the trailer "Dust to Dust" for Gears of War 3.

=== Personnel ===
- Hope Sandoval – vocals
- David Roback – acoustic guitar
- William Cooper Glenn – cello
