= She Hangs Brightly =

Studio album by Mazzy Star
- Released: May 21, 1990
- Studio: Hyde Street Studios (San Francisco, California)
- Genres: Dream pop; experimental rock; psychedelic rock
- Length: 40:28
- Label: Rough Trade
- Producer: David Roback

Mazzy Star chronology
She Hangs Brightly (1990)	So Tonight That I Might See (1993)

Song sample
- 20 seconds of "Halah": file; help

She Hangs Brightly is the debut studio album by American alternative rock band Mazzy Star. It was released on May 21, 1990, by Rough Trade Records and re-released by Capitol Records later in the year.

The song "Ghost Highway" is featured on the soundtrack to the 1994 film "Love and a .45."

== Release and promotion ==
"Blue Flower" was released as a single and reached number 29 on the Billboard Alternative Songs chart. Four years later, "Halah" reached number 19 on the same chart after the success of "Fade into You".

== Music ==
Ben Cardew of Pitchfork said: "Hope Sandoval’s hypnagogic whisper and Roback’s velvety guitar tones create a [...] late-night atmosphere, tempered by songs that borrow from the vivid musical austerity of early blues."

The album showcases the band's trademark effect with haunting guitar work and lyrics, and Hope Sandoval's detached vocals. David Roback's Robby Krieger-inspired psychedelic blues slide guitar style can be heard on the song "Free".

"Ghost Highway" is another psychedelic rock track, with a fast rhythm. This song dates from the band's days as Opal and was initially slated to be the title track of Opal's second album.

"Blue Flower" is a Slapp Happy cover from the 1972 album Sort Of.

== Artwork ==
The album cover artwork is a shot of an Art Nouveau stairway designed by architect Victor Horta at the Hôtel Tassel in Brussels.

== Critical reception ==
Professional ratings
Review scores
Source	Rating
AllMusic	3/5 stars
Chicago Sun-Times	3/4 stars
Chicago Tribune	3.5/4 stars
Entertainment Weekly	A
Los Angeles Times	3.5/5 stars
NME	6/10
Q	4/5 stars
Rolling Stone	4/5 stars
Select	5/5
Uncut	10/10

In a review for Rolling Stone, Gina Arnold praised She Hangs Brightly as being "coldly beautiful". AllMusic's Jason Ankeny described Hope Sandoval's vocals as "more sultry" than those of Opal's Kendra Smith and praised "Halah" and "Blue Flower" but criticized the album's lack of focus, calling the remaining tunes "unmemorable".

Kurt Cobain of Nirvana listed She Hangs Brightly in his top fifty albums of all time. In 2018, Pitchfork ranked the album at number 29 on its list of the 30 best dream pop albums, calling its atmosphere "gorgeous."

== Track listing ==
All tracks are written by Hope Sandoval and David Roback, except where noted.

No.	Title	Writer(s)	Length
1.	"Halah"		3:16
2.	"Blue Flower"	Peter Blegvad; Anthony Moore	3:35
3.	"Ride It On"		3:01
4.	"She Hangs Brightly"		6:24
5.	"I'm Sailin'"	Minnie McCoy	3:13
6.	"Give You My Lovin'"	Sylvia Gomez	3:50
7.	"Be My Angel"		3:17
8.	"Taste of Blood"		5:36
9.	"Ghost Highway"	Roback	3:28
10.	"Free"		3:11
11.	"Before I Sleep"		2:10
Total length:			40:28

== Personnel ==
Credits for She Hangs Brightly adapted from album liner notes.

Musicians

- Hope Sandoval – vocals, tambourine, maracas
- David Roback – acoustic guitar, electric guitar, slide guitar, congas
- Sylvia Gomez – acoustic guitar on "Give You My Lovin'"
- Suki Ewers – keyboards
- William Cooper Glenn – violin, strings
- Paul Olguin – bass guitar
- Keith Mitchell – drums

Technical personnel

- David Roback – production
- Merlyn Rosenberg – photography
- Mazzy Star – cover design
- Eddy Schreyer – mastering

== Charts ==
Chart (1994)	Peak position
Australian Albums (ARIA)	197

Chart (2025)	Peak position
Greek Albums (IFPI)	47
Scottish Albums (Official Charts)	35
UK Albums Sales (OCC)	33
