= Four Walls / Paradise Circus =

"Four Walls" / "Paradise Circus"

Single by Massive Attack and Burial
- Released: 17 October 2011
- Recorded: 2011
- Genre: Trip hop; dubstep; ambient
- Length: 24:29
- Label: Inhale Gold (INHALEGOLD001); The Vinyl Factory (VF034)
- Songwriters: Robert Del Naja; Grantley Marshall; Hope Sandoval; Stew Jackson; Dan Brown
- Producers: Massive Attack; Burial

Massive Attack singles chronology
"Atlas Air" (2010)	"Four Walls" / "Paradise Circus" (2011)	"The Spoils" (2016)

Burial singles chronology
"Ego" / "Mirror" (2011)	"Four Walls" / "Paradise Circus" (2011)	"Nova" (2012)

"Four Walls" / "Paradise Circus" is a collaboration between British electronic music artists Massive Attack and Burial. The single was first released as a limited vinyl edition on 17 October 2011, with pre-orders from 10 October 2011. It consists of Burial mixes of Massive Attack's previously unreleased track "Four Walls", and of "Paradise Circus", which was featured in their 2010 album Heligoland. Both songs contain vocals, and lyrical contributions, by Hope Sandoval of Mazzy Star.

== Background ==
In late 2009, Daddy G of Massive Attack appeared to suggest in an interview with Clash that there would be an equivalent remix album of Heligoland by Burial, yet various comments made afterwards cast major doubt on the prospect ever being more than an idle whim. In May 2010, Massive Attack's Robert Del Naja told Q magazine that, "It's happening, but we can't talk about it. (Burial)'s very private and paranoid about it."

== Release ==
The single release was limited to 1,000 copies worldwide, all of which were sold during the first day of pre-order. The single was pressed on heavyweight 180g 12” vinyl, housed in a hand numbered, gold glitter screen-printed sleeve designed by Robert Del Naja. It was released on 17 October 2011.

== Track listing ==
No.	Title	Length
1.	"Four Walls"	11:57
2.	"Paradise Circus"	12:32
Total length:		24:29

== Chart positions ==
"Paradise Circus"

Chart (2010–13)	Peak position
Belgium (Ultratop 50 Flanders)	33
Belgium (Ultratop 50 Wallonia)	33
France Download (SNEP)	46
Mexico Ingles Airplay (Billboard)	15
Switzerland (Schweizer Hitparade)	41
UK Singles (Official Charts Company)	117
UK Dance (OCC)	12
US Dance/Electronic Digital Songs (Billboard)	27
