= Seasons of Your Day =

Studio album by Mazzy Star
- Released: September 23, 2013
- Recorded: 1997–2012
- Genre: Alternative rock
- Length: 50:05
- Label: Rhymes of an Hour
- Producers: David Roback, Hope Sandoval

Mazzy Star chronology
| Among My Swan (1996) | Seasons of Your Day (2013) | Still (2018) |

Singles from Seasons of Your Day
- 1. "Common Burn"/"Lay Myself Down" Released: October 31, 2011; 2. "California" Released: August 20, 2013; 3. "Seasons of Your Day"/"Sparrow" Released: November 4, 2013

Seasons of Your Day is the fourth and final studio album by American alternative rock band Mazzy Star. It was released on September 23, 2013, by the band's own independent record label, Rhymes of an Hour. Their first record since the release of their third album, Among My Swan, in 1996, and the subsequent dissolution of their contract with Capitol Records the following year, they continued recording in 1997 without a record deal and worked sporadically until the completion of the album in September 2012.

The album was recorded in several locations including California, London and Norway, and features contributions from most of the band's original members, including their late violinist Will Glenn, who died from cancer in 2001. The album also features Hope Sandoval's Warm Inventions partner Colm Ó Cíosóig, while the late Bert Jansch performs guitar on the song "Spoon".

Upon its release, Seasons of Your Day received generally favorable reviews from music critics, who complimented its overall production and quality of songwriting. "Common Burn"/"Lay Myself Down" was released as the lead single from the album on October 31, 2011, digitally, while a limited edition 7" vinyl followed on January 24, 2012. "California" was issued as the first proper single from the album on August 20, 2013. A double A-sided 7" vinyl of "Seasons of Your Day"/"Sparrow" was released through Rough Trade Records on November 4, 2013. The album was followed by a non-album single, "I'm Less Here" on Record Store Day 2014.

The album charted at a career-high position of number 24 on the UK Albums Chart, while also peaking at number five on Billboard's Independent Albums Chart. The band promoted the album with a fourteen date tour of North America in November 2013.

== Background and recording ==
Although an official press release indicated that material found on the album was recorded from 1997 onwards, several interviews conducted since then indicate that some of the material found on the album was recorded in the early 1990s. The Long Ryders guitarist Stephen McCarthy believes his credit for performing pedal steel guitar on "Lay Myself Down" stems from a session he played with the band in the early 1990s. McCarthy, who auditioned to be a member of Mazzy Star in 1990, confirmed in 2013 that he contributed to the demo recording of the song around the time of his audition, and that he was later asked by Roback to re-record the part in a recording studio "nearly 25 years ago." "Lay Myself Down" was performed live as early as August 1994 in The Garage in Highbury, London. The track also features bass guitar performed by Paul Olguin, who performed bass on several tracks found on the band's debut album, She Hangs Brightly.

The band began work on new material following a tour promoting their previous album Among My Swan in 1997. They recorded several tracks during this period, before Capitol Records began requesting the band move towards "big name" producers. Sandoval responded by requesting to be released from their contract with the label, later stating, "It seemed record companies wanted bands to be creative because they didn't know how to manufacture underground music. We could do our own thing and go at our own pace. But that changed when major labels started wanting bands that would sell 7 million records. They had a formula. And suddenly all these people wanted to come to the studio to keep track of what we were doing and make sure we were following that formula. So we got out."

"Spoon" features guitar work from the late folk musician Bert Jansch, whom the band were first introduced to by Geoff Travis in the mid-1990s, when he was asked to open for the band in The Garage in Highbury, London in 1994. Sandoval confirmed that the song was finally demoed in her apartment in Hampstead in the late 1990s, saying "He came over and we had a few beers and played the song in my living room." The studio version of the track was later recorded in Norway in 2000, during the same sessions where Jansch performed on two tracks from Sandoval's first album with The Warm Inventions, Bavarian Fruit Bread, "Butterfly Mornings" and "Charlotte". The title track contains a contribution from the band's former violinist Will Glenn (a.k.a. William Cooper), who died from cancer in 2001.

The band returned briefly in 2000 for a mini-tour of Europe, after which recording sessions resumed sometime in 2002 in Norway, where Sandoval's partner Colm Ó Cíosóig confirmed that he contributed bass, keyboards, guitar and drums to "maybe five tracks" found on the album. Recording continued intermittently thereafter, with sessions taking place between Norway, London and California.

Roback has confirmed that several albums' worth of unreleased material was recorded during the sessions that yielded Seasons of Your Day, although Sandoval has cast doubt on whether any of this material will be released, stating that future albums will "probably" be released "once our families inherit everything after we're dead and gone," adding "[Then] I'm sure people will hear everything."

== Release and promotion ==
The band made their return two years prior to the album's release, with the issue of the double A-sided single "Common Burn" / "Lay Myself Down" in 2011. This was followed in 2012 by a European festival tour and select dates in California, as well as a performance at the Coachella Music Festival. The first single to officially promote the album, "California", was released on August 20, 2013, with a music video for the song being released on September 21. The album was released on several formats, including a 180-gram, double-gatefolded purple-coloured vinyl. In response to the album leaking online on September 14, Seasons of Your Day was streamed on various sources including NPR, The Guardian, CBC Music and Pandora Radio. The album was supported with a fourteen date North American tour beginning on November 3, 2013, with European dates expected to be announced in the future. The band released a 7" vinyl single for "Seasons of Your Day" – backed with album track "Sparrow" – on November 4. Released exclusively through Rough Trade Records, the single was limited to 300 copies worldwide. The band performed "California" on Late Night with Jimmy Fallon on November 25, 2013. On April 19, the band issued two new songs as part of Record Store Day 2014. "I'm Less Here" and "Things" were released on 7" vinyl, with the run limited to 3,000 copies.

== Reception ==
=== Critical reception ===
Professional ratings
Aggregate scores
| Source | Rating |
|---|---|
| AnyDecentMusic? | 7.1/10 |
| Metacritic | 76/100 |
Review scores
| Source | Rating |
| AllMusic | 4/5 stars |
| Alternative Press | 4.5/5 stars |
| Consequence of Sound | D |
| The Guardian | 3/5 stars |
| NME | 8/10 |
| Pitchfork | 7.8/10 |
| The Quietus | 4/5 stars |
| Rolling Stone | 3.5/5 stars |
| Spin | 8/10 |
| Uncut | 9/10 |

Initial critical response to Seasons of Your Day was generally positive. At Metacritic, which assigns a normalized rating out of 100 to reviews from mainstream critics, the album received an average score of 76, based on 25 publications, indicating "generally favorable" reviews.

Will Hermes of Rolling Stone said that the band's sound is "leaner and richer" than on previous albums, commenting that Roback "still trips out" on electric guitar, but that he "stepped it up on his acoustic", stating the album's "folksy psychedelia is as beguiling as anything the band has done. It makes for the best kind of comeback: equal parts return and reinvention." Ben Cardew of NME said that Sandoval's voice "remains an indescribably beautiful thing", commenting that the record's sparsity allows the songs to "seep into [your] bloodstream", awarding the album a score of 8 out of 10. Matt Collar of AllMusic praised the band's "[new] world-weariness and maturity", noting that Roback's guitar work displays "a much more pronounced country and blues influence", before summarising that the album "is everything you could want, finding Mazzy Star older and wiser, but still as dreamy as ever." James Reed of The Boston Globe called the album "prime Mazzy Star: the work of a band that knows what it does well, and then does it beautifully." Tiny Mix Tapes commented that "the arrangements on Seasons Of Your Day are so perfect as to make one forget that this is another 90's band comeback. Maybe the hooks are pushed aside, much like on Among My Swan, [...] but every bit of slide and pedal steel guitar, harpsichord, every softly bowed string and every sleepily drawled vocal is in its exact right place," awarding the album four-and-a-half stars out of five. Similarly, Mark Richardson of Pitchfork opined that "unlike recent records from other bands that made their names in the 1980s and 90s, they haven't lost a thing in the interim", commenting that the album is "rendered so perfectly that it's almost hard to believe. The craftsmanship of the songs—their mix of longing, weary resignation, and dusty cracks of sunlight—remains at a high level", awarding the album a score of 7.8 out of 10.

Graeme Marsh of musicOMH commented that "a lot can happen in 17 years, but one thing that doesn't appear to have changed is Mazzy Star's ability to produce beautiful, mesmerising tunes", awarding the album four stars out of five. Joe Goggins of The Line of Best Fit said that "there's nothing particularly new here, nothing cutting edge, but there is beautiful, considered, genuine song-writing, and to greet such art with any kind of disdain would be nothing short of a travesty," awarding the album 8.5 out of 10. At Alternative Press, Jason Heller told that "the band have only gotten smokier and dreamier", yet wrote that "Mazzy Star may not have evolved much over the past 17 years, but Season Of Your Day proves they never, ever need to."

Other reviews were more critical of the album's lack of experimentation, with Dan Lucas of Drowned in Sound commenting that "when [Mazzy Star] last released an album together, they were 15 years or so ahead of the game. Ultimately then, no criticism can be afforded them for creating an album that’s probably as good as any you’ll hear in the genre this year. But despite Mazzy Star sounding as good as they always have, the album only goes to show that the rest of the world has finally caught up with them."

=== Commercial performance ===
The album debuted at No. 24 on the UK Albums Chart with first week sales of 4,255, making it their highest charting album in the region. The album also debuted at No. 5 on the UK Indie Albums Chart.

== Track listing ==
All songs written by Hope Sandoval and David Roback.

Seasons of Your Day track listing
| No. | Title | Length |
|---|---|---|
| 1. | "In the Kingdom" | 5:15 |
| 2. | "California" | 5:23 |
| 3. | "I've Gotta Stop" | 4:05 |
| 4. | "Does Someone Have Your Baby Now?" | 4:09 |
| 5. | "Common Burn" | 5:10 |
| 6. | "Seasons of Your Day" | 3:41 |
| 7. | "Lay Myself Down" | 4:32 |
| 8. | "Sparrow" | 4:05 |
| 9. | "Spoon" | 6:10 |
| 10. | "Flying Low" | 7:36 |
| Total length: | | 50:05 |

== Personnel ==
=== Musicians ===
- Hope Sandoval – vocals, glockenspiel, harmonica, tambourine, producer, engineer, mixing
- David Roback – acoustic guitar, electric guitar, slide guitar, keyboards, producer, engineer, mixing
- Suki Ewers – keyboards, organ, harpsichord
- William Cooper Glenn – keyboards on "Lay Myself Down"
- Colm Ó Cíosóig – bass
- Keith Mitchell – drums
- Paul Mitchell – viola on "Seasons of Your Day"
- Stephen McCarthy – pedal steel guitar on "Lay Myself Down"
- Paul Olguin – bass on "Lay Myself Down"
- Bert Jansch – acoustic guitar on "Spoon"

=== Production ===
- Barry Bödeker – artwork
- Mark Chaleki – mastering
- Guri Dahl – photography
- Dale Everingham – engineer
- Luz Gallardo – photography
- Helge Stern – mastering
- Audun Strype – mastering

== Charts ==
Chart performance for Seasons of Your Day
| Chart (2013) | Peak position |
|---|---|
| Belgian Albums (Ultratop Flanders) | 44 |
| Belgian Albums (Ultratop Wallonia) | 57 |
| Danish Albums (Hitlisten) | 33 |
| French Albums (SNEP) | 116 |
| German Albums (Offizielle Top 100) | 85 |
| Irish Albums (IRMA) | 64 |
| Scottish Albums (Official Charts) | 22 |
| UK Albums (Official Charts) | 24 |
| UK Independent Albums (Official Charts) | 5 |
| US Billboard 200 | 42 |
| US Independent Albums (Billboard) | 5 |
| US Top Alternative Albums (Billboard) | 8 |
| US Top Rock Albums (Billboard) | 13 |
| US Indie Store Album Sales (Billboard) | 4 |

== Release history ==
Release history for Seasons of Your Day
| Region | Date | Format | Label |
|---|---|---|---|
| France | September 23, 2013 | CD, LP, digital download | Rhymes of an Hour |
| Japan | September 23, 2013 | CD, LP, digital download | Rhymes of an Hour |
| United Kingdom | September 23, 2013 | CD, LP, digital download | Rhymes of an Hour |
| Australia | September 24, 2013 | CD, LP, digital download | Rhymes of an Hour |
| United States | September 24, 2013 | CD, LP, digital download | Rhymes of an Hour |
