= Five Ways of Disappearing =

Studio album by Kendra Smith
- Released: 1995
- Genre: Rock
- Label: 4AD
- Producer: Kendra Smith, A. Phillip Uberman

Kendra Smith chronology
The Guild of Temporal Adventurers (1992)	Five Ways of Disappearing (1995)

Five Ways of Disappearing is an album by the American musician Kendra Smith, released in 1995. It marked a full-album return to music for Smith, who for much of the 1990s had been tending to her northern California organic farm. Smith did not do a lot of promotion for the album, and chose not to tour nationally behind it.

== Production ==
The album was produced by Smith and A. Phillip Uberman. Many of its songs were constructed around the use of a pump organ; others used Turkish drums and harmonium. On some songs, Smith randomly arranged words to form the lyrics, and used multitracked vocals.

"Bold Marauder" is a cover of the Mimi and Richard Farina song.

== Critical reception ==
Professional ratings
Review scores
Source	Rating
AllMusic	3/5 stars
Robert Christgau	B−
Entertainment Weekly	B+
Knoxville News Sentinel	3.5/5 stars
MusicHound Rock: The Essential Album Guide	3.5/5 stars
Rolling Stone	2/5 stars
Spin	7/10
The Sydney Morning Herald	3/4 stars
The Tampa Tribune	2/4 stars

Entertainment Weekly wrote: "Spare and haunting, the eerie keyboards and varied guitar textures drape the songs’ slow tempos and rustic melodies, while Smith’s cool vocals deliver elusive, psychedelic lyrics." Trouser Press called "Bold Marauder" "one of the best acoustic Led Zeppelin imitations in recent memory," and wrote that "though some songs are amiss, precious or overly derivative, as a personal sampler, Five Ways of Disappearing is an impressive—and colorful—achievement." Rolling Stone determined that, "when Smith resigns the organ to a background role and matches her voice's fine edge to the guitar's slightly spacey effects, the results are down to earth and memorable."

Robert Christgau thought that, "with the pump organ and all she does have Her Own Sound, especially if you don't remember Nico too clearly—and unlike Nico, she also has a sense of humor." Spin deemed it "a songwriter's album, in the style of Brian Eno's Taking Tiger Mountain (By Strategy)... Each package of lyrics is showcased inside of a specific set of instrumental routines." The Knoxville News Sentinel concluded that the album "drags listeners into semi-consciousness two ways: sometimes entrancing with atmosphere, sometimes with lulling tedium."

Don McLeese, of the Austin American-Statesman, listed Five Ways of Disappearing as the 4th best album of 1995; Miami New Times also included it on a list of the year's 10 best.

AllMusic wrote that Smith's "deadpan vocal delivery adds another layer of individuality to an offbeat album by an offbeat artist."

== Track listing ==
No.	Title	Length
1.	"Aurelia"
2.	"Bohemian Zebulon"
3.	"Temporarily Lucy"
4.	"In Your Head"
5.	"Space Unadorned"
6.	"Maggots"
7.	"Drunken Boat"
8.	"Interlude/Dirigible"
9.	"Valley of the Morning Sun"
10.	"Judge Not"
11.	"Get There"
12.	"Interlude/Saturn"
13.	"Bold Marauder"
