= The Guild of Temporal Adventurers =

EP by Kendra Smith
- Released: 1992
- Recorded: December 1991
- Genre: Neo-psychedelia, dream pop
- Length: 25:09
- Label: Fiasco
- Producer: Kendra Smith

Kendra Smith chronology
Fell from the Sun (1984)	The Guild of Temporal Adventurers (1992)	Five Ways of Disappearing (1995)

Professional ratings
Review scores
Source	Rating
Allmusic	4/5 stars

The Guild of Temporal Adventurers is an EP by Kendra Smith, released on 1992 through Fiasco.

== Track listing ==
No.	Title	Length
1.	"Interlude: Legbone Tibet"	1:00
2.	"Stars Are in Your Eyes"	3:50
3.	"Interlude: Himalayan Bells"	0:37
4.	"Earth Same Breath"	3:15
5.	"Waiting in the Rain"	3:45
6.	"She Brings the Rain"	4:00
7.	"Iridescence 31"	3:40
8.	"Interlude: Railroad Mix"	0:27
9.	"Wheel of the Law"	4:20

== Personnel ==
The Guild

- Jonah Corey – vocals, Harmonium, organ, engineering, recording
- Kendra Smith – vocals, bass guitar, guitar, production, engineering, recording
- A. Phillip Uberman – Harmonium, organ, guitar, engineering, recording

Production and additional personnel

- Mitch Greenhill – guitar on "She Brings the Rain"
- Eergott Liqueure – guitar on "Stars Are in Your Eyes", "Waiting in the Rain" and "She Brings the Rain"
- Earl Martin – assistant engineering
- Orson – drums on "Stars Are in Your Eyes" and "Waiting in the Rain"
- Franz Pusch – mixing on "Waiting in the Rain"
