= Common Burn / Lay Myself Down =

"Common Burn"/"Lay Myself Down"

Single by Mazzy Star

from the album Seasons of Your Day
- Released: October 31, 2011
- Genre: Alternative rock; folk pop
- Length: 9:41
- Label: Rhymes of an Hour
- Songwriters: Hope Sandoval; David Roback
- Producers: David Roback; Hope Sandoval

Mazzy Star singles chronology
"I've Been Let Down" (1997)	"Common Burn"/"Lay Myself Down" (2011)

"Common Burn"/"Lay Myself Down" is a double A-sided single from alternative rock/dream pop duo Mazzy Star. Their first new material in over 15 years, the single was released by the band's own independent label Rhymes of an Hour Records digitally on October 31, 2011, and on limited edition coloured vinyl on January 24, 2012. The name of their record label is taken from the title of a song found on their last studio album, 1996's Among My Swan.

Recorded in California, London and Norway, the full version of b-side "Lay Myself Down" is available to stream in its entirety on Pitchfork in promotion for the release of the single.

== Track listing ==
No.	Title	Lyrics	Music	Length
1.	"Common Burn"	Hope Sandoval	David Roback	5:07
2.	"Lay Myself Down"	Hope Sandoval	David Roback	4:32
