= Rainy Day (band) =

American musical group

Rainy Day was an all-star Paisley Underground band, a collaborative project composed of members of Los Angeles-based bands including the Dream Syndicate, the Three O'Clock, Rain Parade and the Bangles.

They began collaborating after meeting at a barbecue hosted by members of Green on Red. Rainy Day recorded and released an eponymous album in 1984. It pays tribute to various psychedelic and folk rock acts, and included covers of songs by Bob Dylan, the Beach Boys, Neil Young (with Buffalo Springfield), Big Star, the Velvet Underground, the Who and Jimi Hendrix.

== Band members ==
- Steve Wynn
- Karl Precoda
- Kendra Smith
- Dennis Duck
- Michael Quercio
- Louis Gutierrez (a.k.a. Gregg Gutierrez)
- Mickey Mariano
- Danny Benair
- Steven Roback
- David Roback
- Matt Piucci
- Eddie Kalwa
- Will Glenn
- Vicki Peterson
- Susanna Hoffs

== Discography ==
- Rainy Day (1984)
