= Luck (TV series) =

American television series

- Genre: Drama
- Created by: David Milch
- Starring: Dustin Hoffman; Dennis Farina; John Ortiz; Richard Kind; Kevin Dunn; Ian Hart; Ritchie Coster; Jason Gedrick; Kerry Condon; Gary Stevens; Tom Payne; Jill Hennessy; Nick Nolte
- Opening theme: "Splitting the Atom" by Massive Attack
- Country of origin: United States
- Original language: English
- No. of seasons: 1
- No. of episodes: 9

Production
- Executive producers: David Milch; Michael Mann; Carolyn Strauss
- Producer: Dustin Hoffman
- Running time: 47–67 minutes
- Production company: HBO Entertainment

Original release
- Network: HBO
- Release: December 11, 2011 – March 25, 2012

Luck is an American dramatic television series created by David Milch and starring Dustin Hoffman. Set in the world of horse racing, the pilot episode was directed by Michael Mann. The series premiered January 29, 2012. HBO aired the first episode on December 11, 2011, as a preview. It was immediately renewed for a second season of 10 episodes, scheduled to air beginning in January 2013. However, the series was canceled on March 14, 2012, due to animal safety concerns. Three horses died during production of the series. The first season's remaining episodes continued to air. The complete first season was released on DVD and Blu-ray November 27, 2012.

== Cast ==
Main

- Dustin Hoffman as Chester "Ace" Bernstein
- Dennis Farina as Gus Demitriou
- John Ortiz as Turo Escalante
- Richard Kind as Joey Rathburn
- Kevin Dunn as Marcus Becker
- Ian Hart as Lonnie McHinery
- Ritchie Coster as Renzo Calagari
- Jason Gedrick as Jerry Boyle
- Kerry Condon as Rosie Shanahan
- Gary Stevens as Ronnie Jenkins
- Tom Payne as Leon Micheaux
- Jill Hennessy as Jo Carter
- Nick Nolte as Walter Smith

Recurring

- Joan Allen as Clair Lachay
- Michael Gambon as Michael "Mike" Smythe
- Alan Rosenberg as Nick DeRossi
- Ted Levine as Isadore Cohen
- Patrick J. Adams as Nathan Israel
- Barry Shabaka Henley as Parole Officer
- Chantal Sutherland as Lizzy
- Weronika Rosati as Naomi

== Episodes ==
No.	Title	Directed by	Written by	Original release date	US viewers (millions)
1	"Pilot"	Michael Mann	David Milch	December 11, 2011	1.14
Ace Bernstein is released from prison after three years and begins to plot his revenge on the associates who had him sent away. Ace's lieutenant, Gus, acts as front for an investment in the race horse, Pint of Plain. Pint of Plain's trainer, Turo Escalante, manipulates the odds in favor of one of his other horses, Mon Gateau. The four railbirds — Jerry, Marcus, Renzo and Lonnie — pool their resources to place a Pick Six bet, with Mon Gateau as the centerpiece. Veteran trainer Walter Smith's new Thoroughbred, Gettn'up Morning, sparks an on-track rivalry between untested jockey Rosie and the more experienced Ronnie, represented by agent Joey Rathburn. Ace's plan against his former colleagues includes reviving the Santa Anita racetrack with casino gambling.
2	"Episode Two"	Terry George	John R. Perrotta	February 5, 2012	0.425
Ace loses his temper during a meeting with two of the men who sent him to prison, DiRossi and Cohen. Marcus advises the other railbirds to not flaunt their newfound wealth from the Pick Six. Compulsive gambler Jerry ignores the warning and sits in at high-stakes poker games. Renzo wishes to claim one of Escalante's horses. Lonnie parties with two cunning women. Rosie asks Walter for a chance to ride Gettn'up Morning.
3	"Episode Three"	Allen Coulter	Bill Barich	February 12, 2012	0.549
Gettn'up Morning's jockey, Ronnie, takes a tumble in a race, and Walter is forced to call on Joey to help locate the inexperienced Rosie. Ace meets the young and cocky Nathan Israel, and hires him with the intent of getting closer to his revenge against his former associates. Ace is approached by Claire with a business opportunity. The railbirds attempt to buy back Mon Gateau from Mulligan, and hire Escalante to train him.
4	"Episode Four"	Phillip Noyce	Jay Hovdey	February 19, 2012	0.445
Ace faces off with his one-time partner, Mike, over Ace's plan to take control of the Santa Anita racetrack. Claire proposes a business venture to Ace, who wishes to have a more personal relationship with her. Chan challenges Jerry to a private poker game. The railbirds have to save Jerry from gambling away his life. Rosie has the race of her life on Gettn'up Morning.
5	"Episode Five"	Brian Kirk	Scott Willson	February 26, 2012	0.501
Escalante has entered Pint of Plain in a race with Leon as the jockey, under the premise of needing to appease the gaming board, but he ultimately scratches him. Ace sees through the lies and forces Escalante to swap out Leon for a more experienced jockey. Marcus has health concerns. Joey loses Ronnie as a client. Ace gives Claire a large check and invites her to watch Pint of Plain's first race.
6	"Episode Six"	Henry Bronchtein	Robin Shushan	March 4, 2012	0.686
Israel is offered a chance by Mike to work as a double agent against Ace. An earthquake puts things into perspective for Joey. Leon's actions during his race on Mon Gateau has Escalante and the railbirds worried. Rosie ignores Walter's advice, and he is met with unwanted consequences. Jo wonders about her future with Escalante.
7	"Episode Seven"	Brian Kirk	Amanda Ferguson	March 11, 2012	0.474
Ace and Claire take a tour of a prison outreach horse retirement farm. Walter defends his right of ownership to Gettn'up Morning. Jerry and Naomi try to enter a poker tournament. Israel represents Ace against Mike. Lonnie claims another horse named Niagara's Fall. Walter has a decision to make. Rosie asks Joey for representation. Ronnie attempts to get his life back on track.
8	"Episode Eight"	Allen Coulter	John R. Perotta & Jay Hovdey	March 18, 2012	0.459
Ace makes his move to purchase control of the track, going around his former partners. Mike makes a move of his own. Walter enters Gettn'up Morning in the Western Derby against Pint of Plain. Leon loses his ride. Joey comes through for Rosie as her new agent. Jo's budding pregnancy is put into jeopardy.
9	"Episode Nine"	Mimi Leder	Eric Roth	March 25, 2012	0.440
The Western Derby, pitting Gettn'up Morning and Pint of Plain against each other, serves as the backdrop for other events. Jerry tries to figure out a new big score. Escalante awaits word about Jo. Renzo's mother arrives in town. Ace feels guilt for Israel's fate. Gus goes to extreme lengths to protect Ace.

== Production ==
I hope it's a love letter. By saying that, I'm not saying it's a story coming through rose-colored glasses. To me, the track is what the river was to Mark Twain. Where you see the most life and interesting people, go there. That's what I've done.

— David Milch, about his love for horse racing.

The pilot is about a bunch of intersecting lives in the world of horse racing ... It's a subject which has engaged and some might say has compelled me for 50 years. I find it as complicated and engaging a special world as any I've ever encountered, not only in what happens in the clubhouse and the grandstand, but also on the backside of the track, where the training is done and where they house the horses.

— Milch, about the series.

Before creating Luck, David Milch had worked in television for three decades. He started as a writer on the series Hill Street Blues before co-creating NYPD Blue with Steven Bochco, and creating the HBO series Deadwood.

Milch had been fascinated by horse racing from an early age because his father would take him to the track. "My dad started taking me to Saratoga at age 5 or 6. You have so many associations from childhood that stay with you." He stated that he had been thinking about creating the series for 25 years, and always pictured that it would be set at Santa Anita Park. "It's the most beautiful setting for horse racing that I've seen, and I'd include Saratoga," he said.

The character of on-the-skids jockey Ronnie is portrayed by racing fixture Gary Stevens, a Hall of Fame jockey who won the Kentucky Derby, the Preakness Stakes and the Belmont Stakes in the course of his career. Stevens portrayed jockey George Woolf in the 2003 film, Seabiscuit.

The series used 50 horses trained by Matt Chew at Santa Anita. Milch stated, "Because it's a natural tendency for horses to want to be a part of a herd, most adapt to it very well. We have a couple individuals that have been taught to be race horses; we're not going to get that out of their system. We'll just have to adapt to it. But of the 50 horses, I'd say 45 of them have adapted to it real well."

=== Safety concerns and cancellation ===
The safety of the series's working environment was called into question by People for the Ethical Treatment of Animals (PETA), which criticized Luck over the injury and euthanization of two horses during filming for the pilot and the seventh episode. The American Humane Association (AHA) said that both racehorses "stumbled and fell during short racing sequences", and that "the horses were checked immediately afterwards by the onsite veterinarians and in each case a severe fracture deemed the condition inoperable".

HBO pointed out that precautions had been taken; each horse was "limited to three runs per day and was rested in between those runs". On March 13, 2012, HBO agreed to suspend all filming involving horses while investigations took place over the death of a third horse. The AHA insisted that the stoppage remain in effect until a comprehensive investigation was completed; it also noted the horse's injury did not occur during filming or racing. The following day, HBO cancelled the series, saying that, although it "maintained the highest safety standards throughout production... accidents unfortunately happen and it is impossible to guarantee they won't in the future."

At the time of the series's cancellation, the second episode of the second season was in production. Footage shot for the second season has not been released publicly.

== Reception ==
=== Critical reception ===
On the review aggregator website Rotten Tomatoes, 82% of 50 critics' reviews are positive, with an average rating of 8.23/10. Metacritic, which uses a weighted average, assigned the series a score of 75 out of 100, based on 29 critics, indicating "generally favorable" reviews.

Linda Stasi from the New York Post said in her review, "With an impossibly good cast, writing so spot-on it's poetic, and slow-build stories, I, for one, was left wanting more—even after watching the entire season."

Alessandra Stanley of The New York Times, on the other hand, found the show "needlessly opaque".

Newsday's Verne Gay praised the talent behind the series: "There are three excellent reasons—Milch, Mann and Hoffman—why your faith will be rewarded."

Alan Sepinwall from HitFix called the series "clear and engaging", and singled out Hoffman's performance. "Hoffman is the big name, and gives an impressively buttoned-down performance."

Andrew Anthony of The Guardian complained about the inaudibility of the dialogue and the delivery of the actors.

=== Ratings ===
The December 2011 preview episode garnered a total of 1.14 million viewers on its original airing, with a 0.36 ratings share among adults 18–49. The official series premiere, which aired January 29, 2012, garnered 1.06 million viewers with a 0.3 ratings share. The viewership reached its second lowest mark with the seventh episode, at 474,000 viewers and 0.14 share.

== Music ==
The theme song for the series is "Splitting the Atom" by Massive Attack.

== International distribution ==
Country	Channel	Premiere date	Source(s)
Denmark; Finland; Norway; Sweden	Canal+ Series	March 4, 2012	
Germany	TNT Serie	October 9, 2012	
Ireland; United Kingdom	Sky Atlantic	February 18, 2012	
Portugal	TVSéries	February 5, 2012	
South Africa	M-Net	August 24, 2012	
