= Splitting the Atom =

EP by Massive Attack
- Released: 4 October 2009
- Genre: Electronica
- Length: 22:24

Massive Attack chronology
Collected (2006)	Splitting the Atom (2009)	Heligoland (2010)

Professional ratings
Aggregate scores
Source	Rating
Metacritic	57/100
Review scores
Source	Rating
Consequence of Sound	B
Drowned in Sound	4/10
Pitchfork	4.4/10
PopMatters	6/10
Resident Advisor	4.0/5
The Skinny	3/5 stars
Spin	4/5 stars

Splitting the Atom is an EP by Massive Attack. It was released as a download on 4 October 2009, and on vinyl (limited to 1,000 copies worldwide) on 19 October 2009. The EP contains four new songs, two of which are remixes and all of which contain guest vocalists.

The title track features guest vocals by Horace Andy and keyboards by Damon Albarn and was premiered on BBC Radio 1 on 25 August 2009. The song is featured on the band's fifth album Heligoland, the soundtrack to FIFA 2011, and as the opening theme to the 2011 HBO series Luck, starring Dustin Hoffman. The EP's track, "Bulletproof Love" also appears on the album under the name "Flat of the Blade".

== Track listing ==
No.	Title	Length
1.	"Splitting the Atom" (featuring Horace Andy)	5:13
2.	"Pray for Rain" (featuring Tunde Adebimpe)	6:42
3.	"Bulletproof Love (Van Rivers & The Subliminal Kid Remix)" (featuring Guy Garvey)	6:41
4.	"Psyche (Flash Treatment)" (remixed by Christoffer Berg, featuring Martina Topley-Bird)	3:48
