= Hiatus =

Hiatus may refer to:

- Hiatus (anatomy), a natural fissure in a structure
- Hiatus (stratigraphy), a discontinuity in the age of strata in stratigraphy
- Hiatus, a genus of picture-winged flies with sole member species Hiatus fulvipes
- Global warming hiatus, relating to trends in global temperatures as measured at earth's surface
- Vowel hiatus, a sequence of two syllables with no consonant in the middle

== Film and television ==
- "Hiatus" (30 Rock), first-season finale episode of 30 Rock
- 'Hiatus" (NCIS), an episode of NCIS
- Hiatus (television), a break of several weeks or more in television scheduling
- Hiatus (production), a routine break of television and movie production

== Music ==
- Hiatus (band), a Belgian crustcore band
- The Hiatus, a Japanese rock band
- "Hiatus", a song from the Asking Alexandria album Stand Up and Scream
