= So Tonight That I Might See =

Studio album by Mazzy Star
- Released: September 27, 1993
- Genre: Dream pop
- Length: 51:36
- Label: Capitol
- Producer: David Roback

Mazzy Star chronology
She Hangs Brightly (1990)	So Tonight That I Might See (1993)	Among My Swan (1996)

Singles from So Tonight That I Might See
- 1. "Five String Serenade" Released: June 1993; 2. "Fade into You" Released: September 1993

So Tonight That I Might See is the second studio album by American alternative rock band Mazzy Star, released by Capitol Records on September 27, 1993 in the United Kingdom, and on October 5, 1993 in the United States.

The album's first track, "Fade into You", became the band's first and only single to make the Billboard Hot 100 chart, peaking at number 44, and also charted at number 48 on the UK Singles Chart, and is today the band's best-known song and record.

The release achieved widespread acclaim both contemporarily and retrospectively, and today the album is considered one of the greatest of the 1990s.

== Music ==
So Tonight That I Might See has been characterized as "a dream pop album with a gothic core." The album's style has also been described as "a nexus point between country, folk, psych, and classic rock all shrouded in mystery." According to Evan Rytlewski of Pitchfork: "It plays out in a hallucinogenic swirl: Glimmers of warmth peek through the album’s lurching psychedelia, but they’re ephemeral, interrupted by stern, almost contemptuous blues riffs that glare into the distance. The harder you try to make eye contact with these songs, the more pointedly they avert your gaze."

== Critical reception ==
Professional ratings
Review scores
Source	Rating
AllMusic	4.5/5 stars
Entertainment Weekly	A
Los Angeles Times	3.5/4 stars
NME	8/10
Pitchfork	9.4/10
Rolling Stone	2/5 stars
The Rolling Stone Album Guide	3/5 stars
Uncut	10/10
Vox	8/10

Los Angeles Times critic Steve Hochman raved that So Tonight That I Might See "may be the culmination" of the Paisley Underground scene from which Mazzy Star originated, deeming the album "far more narcotic and hypnotic than anything the whole techno-trance universe has digitally blipped up to date." In NME, Keith Cameron called it "an even more lustrous, becalmed work" than Mazzy Star's 1990 debut She Hangs Brightly, and the magazine later ranked it as the 44th-best album of 1993. Lorraine Ali was more critical in Rolling Stone, writing that the album's initially intriguing qualities grow "increasingly monotonous", while Robert Christgau of The Village Voice dismissed it as a "dud".

In a retrospective review for AllMusic, Ned Raggett said that "So Tonight That I Might See remains the group's undisputed high point, mixing in plenty of variety among its tracks without losing sight of what made the group so special to begin with." In 2010, Pitchfork listed "Fade into You" as the 19th-best track of the 1990s, while So Tonight That I Might See was ranked second on the website's 2018 list of the best dream pop albums, and 116th on its 2022 list of the best albums of the 1990s.

== Track listing ==
All tracks are written by Hope Sandoval and David Roback, except where noted.

No.	Title	Writer(s)	Length
1.	"Fade into You"		4:55
2.	"Bells Ring"		4:32
3.	"Mary of Silence"		6:02
4.	"Five String Serenade"	Arthur Lee	4:24
5.	"Blue Light"		5:10
6.	"She's My Baby"		4:25
7.	"Unreflected"		3:42
8.	"Wasted"		5:31
9.	"Into Dust"		5:36
10.	"So Tonight That I Might See"		7:19
Total length:			51:36

== Personnel ==
Credits are adapted from the album's liner notes.

- Hope Sandoval
- David Roback
- Keith Mitchell
- William Cooper
- Jason Yates
- Dale Everingham – engineer, technical assistance

== Charts ==
Chart (1994–2026)	Peak position
Australian Albums (ARIA)	154
Belgian Albums (Ultratop Flanders)	109
Dutch Vinyl Charts (Dutch Charts)	32
Irish Albums (IRMA)	84
Scottish Albums (Official Charts)	40
UK Albums (Official Charts)	68
US Billboard 200	36

== Certifications ==
Region	Certification	Certified units/sales
New Zealand (RMNZ)	Platinum	15,000^{‡}
United Kingdom (BPI) BPI cert 1	Silver	60,000^{^}
United Kingdom (BPI) BPI cert 2	Gold	100,000^{‡}
United States (RIAA)	Platinum	1,000,000^{^}
^{^} Shipments figures based on certification alone.^{‡} Sales+streaming figures based on certification alone.
