= Opal (band) =

American rock band

- Kendra Smith and David Roback Photo © Laura Levine

Background information
- Also known as: Clay Allison (1982–1984)
- Origin: Los Angeles, California, United States
- Genres: Neo-psychedelia, psychedelic rock
- Years active: c. 1983–1989
- Labels: SST, Rough Trade (UK),
- Spinoffs: Mazzy Star
- Past members: David Roback (guitar); Kendra Smith (vocals, bass); Keith Mitchell (drums); Juan Gómez (bass); Suki Ewers (organ, vocals); William Cooper; Aaron Sherer

Opal was an American rock band in the 1980s. They were part of the Paisley Underground musical style. The band's name is derived from "Opel", a song by Syd Barrett.

The group formed in the mid-1980s under the name Clay Allison, featuring guitarist David Roback (previously of Rain Parade), bassist Kendra Smith (from Dream Syndicate) and drummer Keith Mitchell. After one single, they released the remaining Clay Allison tracks under the band's new name, Opal, on the 1984 Fell from the Sun EP. Another EP, Northern Line, followed in 1985. These EPs were later compiled and released as Early Recordings.

Happy Nightmare Baby, Opal's first full-length album, was released in 1987. Smith left the group during the Happy Nightmare tour after a show in Providence, Rhode Island. Roback continued with vocalist Hope Sandoval, playing shows as Opal and planning an album to be titled Ghost Highway but in 1989 this band became Mazzy Star and Ghost Highway was presumably released as She Hangs Brightly. Kendra Smith released a number of solo singles, EPs, and one album before retiring to the woods of northern California.

On their debut 1990 album The Comforts of Madness UK band Pale Saints included a cover version of the Opal song "Fell from the Sun". The 2020 reissue of that album included a more raw and earlier version of "Fell from the Sun" along with the original cover.

The song "She's a Diamond" was included in the film Boys Don't Cry but was not included on the CD release of the film soundtrack.

David Roback died on February 24, 2020.

== Discography ==
=== Clay Allison ===
- "Fell from the Sun"/"All Souls" (7-inch single) (1984)

=== Kendra Smith / David Roback / Keith Mitchell ===
- "Fell From The Sun" EP (1984)

=== Opal ===
==== EPs ====
- Fell from the Sun (1984, Rough Trade (UK))
- Northern Line (1985, One Big Guitar)

==== Studio albums ====
- Happy Nightmare Baby (1987, SST (US), Rough Trade (UK))

==== Compilation albums ====
- Early Recordings (Rough Trade, 1989; Salley Gardens, 2019)

==== Other appearances ====
- I Am The Fly (Chemical Imbalance #CI 003, 1987) - limited edition four-band, four-song 7", with Opal's version of The Doors song "Indian Summer"
- Beyond The Wildwood - A Tribute To Syd Barret (Imaginary Records, 1987) - features "If The Sun Don't Shine (Jugband Blues)"
