= Heligoland (album) =

2010 studio album by Massive Attack

Studio album by Massive Attack
- Released: 8 February 2010
- Recorded: 2005–2009
- Studios: 100 Suns (Bristol); Robot Club (Bristol); Attic (Bristol); Studio 13 (London); Stickydisc Recordings (Brooklyn); UML / Amber (New York City)
- Genres: Electronica; trip hop; alternative dance
- Length: 53:05
- Label: Virgin
- Producers: Robert Del Naja; Neil Davidge; Grant Marshall

Massive Attack chronology
Splitting the Atom (2009)	Heligoland (2010)	Ritual Spirit (2016)

Singles from Heligoland
- 1. "Psyche" Released: 2009; 2. "Paradise Circus" Released: 17 October 2011

Heligoland is the fifth studio album by English electronic music duo Massive Attack, released on 8 February 2010 by Virgin Records. Named after a German archipelago, it was their first studio album in seven years, following 100th Window (2003). It is the first album to feature Daddy G since Mezzanine (1998), therefore making it the first album by the band to be recorded as a duo. It also features recurring guest vocalists Horace Andy and Damon Albarn along with Martina Topley-Bird, Guy Garvey, Tunde Adebimpe and Hope Sandoval. It has been certified Gold by the British Phonographic Industry (BPI).

== Personnel ==
The record primarily features vocals from Horace Andy, as well as a number of guest vocalists: Tunde Adebimpe of TV on the Radio, Damon Albarn of Blur and Gorillaz, Hope Sandoval of Hope Sandoval and the Warm Inventions and Mazzy Star, Guy Garvey of Elbow and Martina Topley-Bird. Further contributions include guitar by Adrian Utley of Portishead (on "Saturday Come Slow"), keys from Portishead collaborator John Baggott (most notably on "Atlas Air"), keys and synth bass from Damon Albarn ("Splitting the Atom" and "Flat of the Blade" respectively), guitar (various tracks) and bass ("Girl I Love You") by Neil Davidge, bass by Billy Fuller of Beak (various tracks) and drumming from both the late Jerry Fuchs and regular Massive Attack session and touring drummer Damon Reece.

Dan Brown and Stew Jackson (Robot Club) co-wrote "Paradise Circus", played guitar on and co-wrote "Saturday Come Slow", and part-programmed and engineered those tracks. Tim Goldsworthy contributed additional production (specific tracks unstated). Most tracks were mixed by Mark "Spike" Stent and mastered by Tim Young at Metropolis Studios, as with previous records. Unlike previous records, there are no personal acknowledgements on the inlay. Most tracks were co-produced by Neil Davidge and Robert Del Naja; Grant Marshall only contributed production to "Splitting The Atom", "Paradise Circus" and "Saturday Come Slow", but co-wrote every track. The album is dedicated to the memory of Blue Lines co-producer, Jonny Dollar.

== Background ==
The album's release was preceded by the release of the Splitting the Atom EP on 4 October 2009. During its development, the album was often referred to in the media as "LP5" (a reference to this being their fifth studio album) or "Weather Underground" (Robert Del Naja's early working title).

The artwork, as with every Massive Attack album since Protection, is a collaboration between Tom Hingston and Del Naja, this time based on Del Naja's paintings. For an advertisement campaign on the London Underground, local traffic authority Transport for London insisted the cover image featured on advertising posters be altered so as not to resemble "street art", obliging the artists to remove drips and fuzz from the original image; this was intended to conform with their policy to not encourage graffiti.

Many other guest vocalists recorded sessions in the time after 100th Window but did not end up being featured on the album. These include: Stephanie Dosen, Yolanda Quartey of Phantom Limb – effectively Robot Club's band) and Jhelisa (Anderson, who had previously recorded in 2002 in the studio for material that was not included on 100th Window); and, mostly before the release of Collected – Mike Patton, Aku and Akwetey Orraca-Tetteh and Devang Shah of Dragons of Zynth, Elizabeth Fraser, Terry Callier, Fredo Viola, Debbie Clare, Beth Orton and Dot Allison. Mos Def and Leslie Feist were named as artists scheduled for recording sessions back in 2004. Backing tracks from Grant Marshall's side of Massive Attack's writing (mainly facilitated by and done with Robot Club) are known to have been sent to Alice Russell, and prepared for Sharon Jones, Patti Smith and David Bowie during the era but collaboration did not come to fruition, nor did talks with Tom Waits or Tricky, in terms of featuring as guest vocalists on the record. Post-punks Mark Stewart and Keith Levene were pictured inside Del Naja's 100 Suns studio in 2009, but played no part on the album.

Del Naja said of the musical style of Heligoland,

"I think it's got definitely a more organic feel. [...] 100th Window was very much about this amalgamation of everything joining, and eventually the process was so extreme that you couldn't tell if there was a string part if it was electronic or natural. [There were] lots of organic parts that ended up sounding very electronic. It became a whole world of different processes, and we wanted to do something a bit different because we've had that experience so we wanted to do something else."

The track "Girl I Love You", one of multiple tracks featuring Horace Andy, is a drastically reworked version of a song originally written by Andy during his solo career.

"Paradise Circus"
Paradise Circus feat Hope Sandoval

== Promotion ==
Eight low-budget films were officially released online in promotion of Heligoland:

- "Splitting the Atom" (Promo 1), directed by Baillie Walsh (2009).
- "Paradise Circus", directed by Toby Dye (2009) features clips from an old pornographic film, interspersed with an interview with the film's now-aged female star Georgina Spelvin, who describes each stage of a film-oriented sex act and emphasises the added erotic excitement of the camera.
- "Splitting the Atom" (Promo 2), directed by Edouard Salier (2009). Video on YouTube
- "Flat of the Blade", directed by Ewan Spencer (2009)
- "Saturday Come Slow", directed by Adam Broomberg and Oliver Chanarin (2010), features a former Guantanamo Bay detainee at a laboratory in Cambridge, where he and a professor work in tandem to discuss the use of loud sounds as a means of torture.
- "Psyche", directed by John Downer (2010)
- "Atlas Air", directed by Eduard Salier, was downloadable with the digital Version of the Atlas Air EP. The video is in fact a prequel to Salier's version of "Splitting the Atom"
- "Pray for Rain", directed by Jake Scott (2011)

Furthermore, a "United Snakes" video by UnitedVisualArtists, along with a previous alternate promo for "Psyche" directed by Dougal Wilson were also released.

"Paradise Circus" was licensed as the theme tune for the BBC drama series Luther. "Paradise Circus" can also be heard in Gossip Girl, "Misfits" (S2, Ep4), Revenge (S2, Ep6) and "9 Crimes", the fourth episode of the third season of True Blood, as well as in the 2011 advert "Dominoes" for Citroën C5. A remixed version of "Paradise Circus" by Gui Boratto, can also be heard on Lincoln MKX commercials featuring Mad Men's John Slattery. "Splitting the Atom" is in the video game FIFA 11.

== Release ==
Professional ratings
Aggregate scores
Source	Rating
AnyDecentMusic?	7.0/10
Metacritic	72/100
Review scores
Source	Rating
AllMusic	3.5/5 stars
Entertainment Weekly	B−
The Guardian	4/5 stars
The Irish Times	4/5 stars
Los Angeles Times	3/4 stars
NME	6/10
Pitchfork	5.0/10
Rolling Stone	4/5 stars
Spin	7/10
Uncut	4/5 stars

The deluxe edition of Heligoland, available digitally and as a deluxe vinyl edition release, features three additional remixes as well as the "False Flags" B-side, "United Snakes". Heligoland Remixed is a largely identical release, with the only difference being the replacement of "United Snakes" with an additional remix; this release was uploaded for listening on the duo's Facebook page. The standard edition is also available with a number of differently coloured covers.

== Burial remix album ==
In late 2009, Marshall suggested in an interview with Clash that the entirety of Heligoland may be remixed by Burial for release as a companion album, though various comments made afterwards suggest that this had been little more than an idea, with no actual work done on these remixes.

In May 2010, Del Naja told Q magazine: "It's happening, but we can't talk about it. [Burial]'s very private and paranoid about it."

"Four Walls"/"Paradise Circus", a single containing Burial's remix of "Paradise Circus", along with a remix of a previously unreleased Massive Attack track, "Four Walls" was released in 2011.

== Atlas Air EP ==
In interviews, Massive Attack had stated their intention to release an EP of leftover Heligoland tracks in May or June 2010. Songs said to be contained on this EP included "Invade Me" and "Red Light", both featuring Martina Topley-Bird.

Subsequently, Massive Attack announced plans for the release of the Atlas Air EP, both digitally and as a limited edition of 1,000 units on vinyl record, on 1 November 2010, in aid of charity organization Warchild. The EP would feature an edit of the titular song; a Tim Goldsworthy remix; a Guy Garvey-penned and previously unfinished Heligoland track, "Redlight", featuring Guy Garvey on vocals; and its respective remix by Warp artist, Clark.

Plans for the release were later changed: The release was moved back to 22 November 2010; The original version of "Redlight" was removed and replaced by the Jneiro Jarel remix of "Atlas Air", meaning that the EP would feature no previously unreleased work by the band. Additionally, vocals on the remix of "Redlight" were replaced with an uncredited female vocalist instead of those of its songwriter, Guy Garvey.

== Track listing ==
Standard edition
No.	Title	Writer(s)	Vocals	Length
1.	"Pray for Rain"	Robert Del Naja; Grant Marshall; Neil Davidge; Tunde Adebimpe	Adebimpe	6:44
2.	"Babel"	Del Naja; Marshall; Davidge; Martina Topley-Bird	Topley-Bird	5:20
3.	"Splitting the Atom"	Del Naja; Marshall; Davidge; Damon Albarn	3D; Daddy G; Albarn; Horace Andy	5:17
4.	"Girl I Love You"	Del Naja; Marshall; Davidge; Andy	Andy	5:27
5.	"Psyche"	Del Naja; Marshall; Davidge; Topley-Bird	Topley-Bird	3:25
6.	"Flat of the Blade"	Del Naja; Marshall; Davidge; Albarn; Guy Garvey	Garvey	5:30
7.	"Paradise Circus"	Del Naja; Marshall; Hope Sandoval; Stew Jackson; Dan Brown	Sandoval	4:58
8.	"Rush Minute"	Del Naja; Marshall; Davidge	3D	4:51
9.	"Saturday Come Slow"	Del Naja; Marshall; Albarn; Jackson; Brown	Albarn	3:44
10.	"Atlas Air"	Del Naja; Marshall; Davidge; John Baggott	3D	7:49
Total length:				53:05

Japanese edition bonus track
No.	Title	Writer(s)	Length
11.	"Fatalism" (Ryuichi Sakamoto & Yukihiro Takahashi remix)	Del Naja; Marshall; Davidge; Guy Garvey	4:54
Total length:			57:59

Amazon digital extended edition bonus tracks
No.	Title	Writer(s)	Length
11.	"Paradise Circus" (Gui Boratto remix)	Del Naja; Marshall; Sandoval; Jackson; Brown	8:07
12.	"Fatalism" (Ryuichi Sakamoto & Yukihiro Takahashi remix)	Del Naja; Marshall; Davidge; Garvey	4:54
13.	"Girl I Love You" (She Is Danger remix)	Del Naja; Marshall; Davidge; Andy	5:00
14.	"Paradise Circus" (Breakage's Tight Rope remix)	Del Naja; Marshall; Sandoval; Jackson; Brown	4:44
Total length:			75:83

iTunes Store deluxe edition bonus tracks
No.	Title	Writer(s)	Length
15.	"United Snakes"	Del Naja; Davidge	9:44
16.	"Pray for Rain" (Tim Goldsworthy remix)	Del Naja; Marshall; Davidge; Adebimpe	7:24
Total length:			92:97

== Personnel ==
Credits adapted from the liner notes of Heligoland.

=== Massive Attack ===
- Robert Del Naja – vocals, keyboards, programming
- Grant Marshall – vocals

=== Additional musicians ===
- Horace Andy – vocals
- Tunde Adebimpe – vocals
- Martina Topley-Bird – vocals
- Guy Garvey – vocals
- Hope Sandoval – vocals
- Damon Albarn – vocals, bass, keyboards
- Damon Reece – drums
- Jerry Fuchs – drums
- Billy Fuller – bass
- Neil Davidge – bass, keyboards, guitar, programming
- John Baggott – keyboards
- Tim Goldsworthy – keyboards, programming
- Dan Austin – keyboards, programming
- Euan Dickinson – keyboards, programming
- Adrian Utley – guitar
- Stew Jackson – guitar, programming
- Dan Brown – guitar, programming
- Dave Sitek – guitar
- Harry Brown – brass
- Noel Langley – brass
- Chris Storr – brass
- Andy Grappy – brass
- Stuart Gordon – string arrangements (track 7)

=== Technical ===
- Robert Del Naja – production
- Neil Davidge – production (all tracks); mixing (tracks 2, 7)
- Grant Marshall – production (tracks 3, 7, 9)
- Tim Goldsworthy – additional production
- Mark "Spike" Stent – mixing (tracks 1, 3–6, 8–10)
- Matty Green – mixing assistance (tracks 1, 3–6, 8–10)
- Euan Dickinson – mixing assistance (tracks 2, 7); engineering (all tracks)
- Eric Broucek – engineering
- Lee Shephard – engineering
- Leo Sidran – engineering
- Jason Cox – engineering
- Graham Archer – engineering
- Robot Club – engineering
- Tim Young – mastering at Metropolis Mastering (London)

=== Artwork ===
- Robert Del Naja – art, design, art direction
- Tom Hingston Studio – design, art direction

== Charts ==
=== Weekly charts ===
Weekly chart performance for Heligoland
Chart (2010)	Peak position
Australian Albums (ARIA)	8
Australian Dance Albums (ARIA)	3
Austrian Albums (Ö3 Austria)	5
Belgian Albums (Ultratop Flanders)	1
Belgian Albums (Ultratop Wallonia)	2
Canadian Albums (Billboard)	12
Czech Albums (ČNS IFPI)	4
Danish Albums (Hitlisten)	6
Dutch Albums (Album Top 100)	5
European Albums (Billboard)	2
Finnish Albums (Suomen virallinen lista)	11
French Albums (SNEP)	2
German Albums (Offizielle Top 100)	4
Greek International Albums (IFPI)	2
Hungarian Albums (MAHASZ)	32
Irish Albums (IRMA)	9
Italian Albums (FIMI)	7
Japanese Albums (Oricon)	29
Mexican Albums (Top 100 Mexico)	57
New Zealand Albums (RMNZ)	7
Norwegian Albums (VG-lista)	12
Polish Albums (ZPAV)	2
Portuguese Albums (AFP)	5
Scottish Albums (Official Charts)	12
Spanish Albums (Promusicae)	13
Swedish Albums (Sverigetopplistan)	17
Swiss Albums (Schweizer Hitparade)	2
UK Albums (Official Charts)	6
UK Dance Albums (Official Charts)	1
US Billboard 200	46
US Top Alternative Albums (Billboard)	5
US Top Dance Albums (Billboard)	4

=== Year-end charts ===
Year-end chart performance for Heligoland
Chart (2010)	Position
Australian Dance Albums (ARIA)	29
Belgian Albums (Ultratop Flanders)	30
Belgian Albums (Ultratop Wallonia)	48
European Albums (Billboard)	63
French Albums (SNEP)	58
Italian Albums (FIMI)	94
Swiss Albums (Schweizer Hitparade)	53
UK Albums (OCC)	150
US Top Dance/Electronic Albums (Billboard)	15

== Certifications ==
Certifications for Heligoland
Region	Certification	Certified units/sales
France (SNEP)	Gold	50,000^{*}
Italy (FIMI)	Gold	25,000^{*}
Poland (ZPAV)	Gold	10,000^{*}
United Kingdom (BPI)	Gold	122,187
^{*} Sales figures based on certification alone.
