= The Brook Lee Catastrophe =

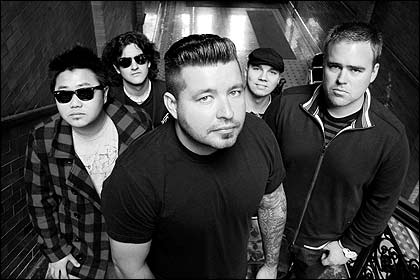

Background information
- Origin: Long Beach, California, United States
- Genres: Folk-rock, Americana, pop, alternative
- Years active: 2005–present
- Labels: unsigned
- Members: Brook Lee, Paul Mitchell, Michael Duncan, George Madrid, Ryan Nakata
- Website: thebrookleecatastrophe.com

The Brook Lee Catastrophe is an American folk-rock band from Long Beach, California. Founded in 2005 by Brook Lee and Paul Mitchell, their sound is described as reminiscent of Arcade Fire, Tom Waits, and Wilco.

== Band members ==
- Brook Lee - acoustic/electric guitar, vocals
- Paul Mitchell - violin, keyboard
- Michael Duncan - drums, percussion
- George Madrid - electric guitar
- Ryan Nakata - bass guitar

== The beginning ==
The Catastrophe formed on the eve of the Mistakes Pt. 1 release in 2005. Lee and Mitchell met on a west coast tour while promoting their previous musical ventures. The two became friends and started collaborating on a record together. Mistakes Pt. 1 was recorded during a two-year period in Mitchell's Long Beach apartment with an extended family of local Long Beach area musicians and friends including former Mazzy Star drummer (and Paul's father) Keith Mitchell. To showcase the songs for the Mistakes Pt. 1 CD release show, Lee and Mitchell solicited the help of Madrid, Nakata, and Duncan who had been in Paul's former band, to perform the songs. The Catastrophe was complete and they began touring their debut album as a permanent group of musicians. Since their debut, the band has frequented famous Los Angeles venues such as The Troubadour, The Silverlake Lounge, The Hard Rock Cafe on Hollywood Boulevard, The Hotel Cafe, El Cid, The Key Club lounge, The Viper Room, and The House of Blues on Sunset Boulevard.

== Currently ==
The band is on hiatus but continues to write and record, and will be releasing content in the future. Los Angeles based music producer Rick Parker whose credits include The Black Rebel Motorcycle Club, Jewel, The Dandy Warhols, and Miranda Lee Richards has produced two of The BLC's albums; The Weight Of Waiting, and American Hotel. The band tours mainly on the west coast of the United States but has toured all over the continental United States as well. The BLC have played shows with fellow west coast bands such as The Young Dubliners, Delta Spirit, Matt Costa, Cold War Kids, Toad The Wet Sprocket, and Avi Buffalo.

== Studio albums / discography ==
- Mistakes Pt. 1 (2005)
- The Weight of Waiting (2007)
- American Hotel (2010)
- Motel Americana (2011)
