= Among My Swan =

Studio album by Mazzy Star
- Released: October 29, 1996
- Genres: Dream pop; alternative rock; neo-psychedelia
- Length: 54:00
- Label: Capitol
- Producer: Mazzy Star

Mazzy Star chronology
So Tonight That I Might See (1993)	Among My Swan (1996)	Seasons of Your Day (2013)

Among My Swan is the third studio album by American band Mazzy Star, released on October 29, 1996 by Capitol Records. Although Among My Swan did not contain any US Billboard Hot 100 hits like its predecessor, So Tonight That I Might See, this album garnered the band its highest-ranking single on the UK Singles Chart, when "Flowers in December" reached No. 40 in November 1996.

While the production of Among My Swan relies less on reverb than the group's previous albums, the music is not markedly different (as evidenced by tracks like "I've Been Let Down", on which Hope Sandoval sings over simple acoustic guitar and harmonica accompaniment).

"Flowers in December", "Disappear", "Happy" and "I've Been Let Down" were all released as singles from the album. Following the release of "I've Been Let Down" in 1997, Mazzy Star went on hiatus, and did not release new music until the single "Common Burn" / "Lay Myself Down" in 2011.

== Release and promotion ==
Professional ratings
Review scores
Source	Rating
AllMusic	3.5/5 stars
Entertainment Weekly	A−
The Guardian	3/5 stars
Los Angeles Times	3/4 stars
Q	3/5 stars
The Rolling Stone Album Guide	2/5 stars
Select	4/5
Spin	3/10
Uncut	7/10
Vox	8/10

Among My Swan was released by Capitol Records on October 29, 1996. Mazzy Star opted to eschew mainstream promotion for the record, with Capitol taking what they described as a "long-term approach" towards its marketing. An outtake from the album, "Tell Me Now", appeared on the soundtrack to Batman Forever in 1995, while album track "Rhymes of an Hour" featured on the soundtrack to Stealing Beauty prior to the album's release. A senior marketing director at Capitol called Mazzy Star "the quintessential artist-development band. David and Hope are artists. Every album they make is a work of art"; Billboard noted that both films "nicely bookend Mazzy Star's demographic, with Batman Forever appealing to the collegiate crowd and the critically acclaimed, art-house Stealing Beauty skewing toward the band's baby boomer fans."

Music stores were given advance copies of the album from early September; the label conducted a contest where the store which best promoted the album would be rewarded with a live performance from the band. (Note: According to Billboard, the winning store was "decided by in-store play and point-of-purchase plans.") The entire album was serviced to college radio on October 7, and lead single "Flowers in December" was issued to alternative and triple-A stations the following week. The duo appeared on the October 1996 cover of Alternative Press, and a music video for "Flowers in December" was completed that same month. The song remains the duo's only song to enter the top forty of the UK Singles Chart. "I've Been Let Down" was scheduled to be issued as the album's second commercial single in the spring of 1997, but was released solely as a limited edition 7" vinyl in October 1996 as a double A-side with album track "Roseblood".

== Commercial performance ==
The album peaked at number 67 on the Billboard 200. As of 2001, it has sold over 214,000 copies in the United States.

== Track listing ==
All tracks are written by David Roback and Hope Sandoval.

No.	Title	Length
1.	"Disappear"	4:04
2.	"Flowers in December"	4:57
3.	"Rhymes of an Hour"	4:12
4.	"Cry, Cry"	3:58
5.	"Take Everything"	4:53
6.	"Still Cold"	4:48
7.	"All Your Sisters"	5:16
8.	"I've Been Let Down"	3:17
9.	"Roseblood"	4:51
10.	"Happy"	3:58
11.	"Umbilical"	4:49
12.	"Look on Down from the Bridge"	4:47

== Personnel ==
=== Musicians ===
- Hope Sandoval – vocals, harmonica, tambourine, songwriter, co-producer, album design
- David Roback – acoustic guitar, electric guitar, piano, keyboards, songwriter, producer, audio engineering, album design
- William Cooper Glenn – violin, cello, strings, audio engineering
- Jill Emery – bass
- Keith Mitchell – drums
- William Reid – additional guitar on "Take Everything"
- Aaron Sherer – drums on "Take Everything" and "Still Cold"

=== Production ===
- Beth Herschaft – photography
- Eddy Schreyer – mastering
- Dale Everingham – engineer
- Tom Cashen – production crew

== Usage in media ==
"Happy", "All Your Sisters", and "Look on Down from the Bridge" are featured in the 2005 film Down in the Valley.

"Look on Down from the Bridge" is featured twice in the 1999 The Sopranos episode "Meadowlands"; during a funeral scene and over the end credits. It's also used in the 2011 film Texas Killing Fields, and in two episodes of Rick and Morty, including the 2014 episode "Rick Potion No. 9" when the title characters bury their dead alternate-reality selves and the 2023 episode "Unmortricken" which includes a callback to the original scene. “Cry, Cry” was featured in a sequence in the 2024 movie Beetlejuice Beetlejuice.

== Charts ==
Chart performance for Among My Swan
Chart (1996)	Peak position
Australian Albums (ARIA)	74
New Zealand Albums (RMNZ)	41
Scottish Albums (Official Charts)	65
UK Albums (Official Charts)	57
US Billboard 200	68

Chart (2026)	Peak position
Greek Albums (IFPI)	58

== Certifications ==
Region	Certification	Certified units/sales
United Kingdom (BPI)	Silver	60,000^{‡}
^{‡} Sales+streaming figures based on certification alone.
