= Kendra Smith =

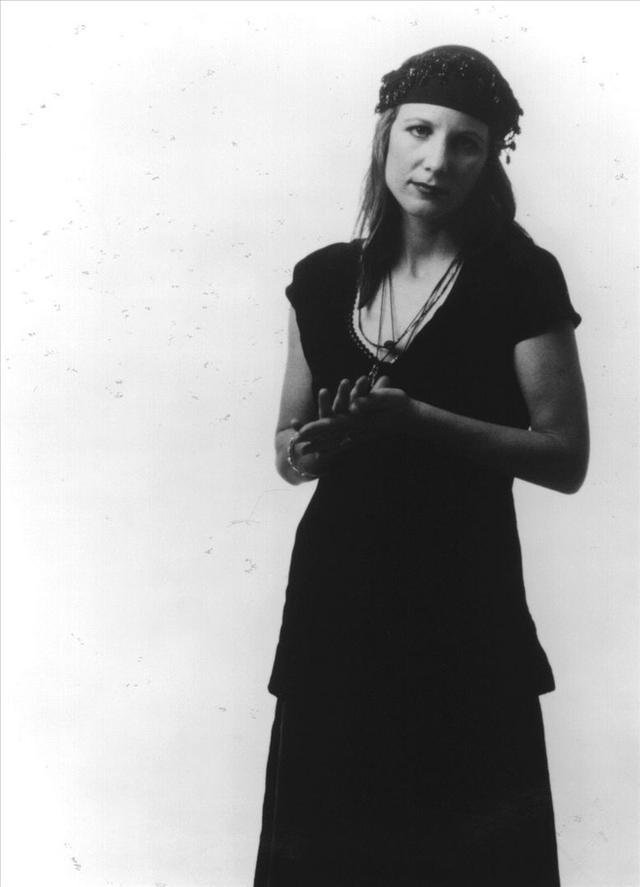

Background information
- Born: Kendra Louise Smith; March 14, 1960 (age 66); Champlin, Minnesota, U.S.
- Genres: Alternative music
- Occupations: Singer; songwriter; musician
- Instruments: Vocals; harmonium; bass
- Years active: 1979–1995; 2017–2018
- Labels: Fiasco, 4AD
- Formerly of: The Dream Syndicate; Rainy Day; Opal

Kendra Smith (born March 14, 1960) is an American musician who was a founding member and bassist of The Dream Syndicate, a member of Opal, and later recorded as a solo artist.

== Biography ==
Smith, Steve Wynn and Russ Tolman met as students at UC Davis, where all three had shows on KDVS. With Steve Suchil on bass, Gavin Blair on drums, Wynn and Tolman on guitars, and Smith on lead vocals, they formed a garage band called the Suspects, who released one privately pressed single. Smith and Wynn then formed The Dream Syndicate in 1981 and went on to record an EP and an album, with Smith playing bass, before she left in 1983 to join former Rain Parade guitarist David Roback in Rainy Day (she had worked with Roback before, singing backing vocals on the Rain Parade album Emergency Third Rail Power Trip). Rainy Day released an album and a single in 1984 before Roback and Smith became a duo in the psychedelic-tinged band Clay Allison, later Opal.

Opal released only one record, the Northern Line EP, and one album, Happy Nightmare Baby, before they split up but had recorded enough material for the Early Recordings compilation. Smith left Opal during the band's final tour and was replaced by Hope Sandoval, with Opal changing its name to Mazzy Star after the tour.

Smith formed a new band, The Guild of Temporal Adventurers, with Jonah Corey and A. Phillip Uberman, who released an eponymous mini-LP in 1992, with Smith playing the pump organ. Her next release would not be until 1995 when the 4AD label issued her debut solo LP, Five Ways of Disappearing, described by Trouser Press as "an impressive — and colorful — achievement".

Not much is known about her after the solo album came out except according to 4AD she had moved to the woods of Northern California in the early 1990s, living in a small cabin with no electricity, and returned there after making two appearances to promote the album.

In 2017, Smith sang on the last track on The Dream Syndicate's reunion album How Did I Find Myself Here?, her first appearance on a musical recording since 1995, and returned with the Syndicate for her first live performances since Terrastock 2 in 1998. In 2018, she contributed the song “Moon Boat” to the soundtrack for the film Leave No Trace.

== Discography ==
=== With Suspects ===
- "Talking Loud" 7" (1979)

=== With The Dream Syndicate ===
- The Dream Syndicate mini-LP (1982) Down There (UK Indie #25)
- The Days of Wine and Roses (1982) Ruby/Rough Trade (UK Indie #7)
- Tell Me When It's Over 12" EP (1983) Rough Trade (UK Indie #11)
- "Kendra's Dream" from How Did I Find Myself Here? (2017) Anti-

=== With Clay Allison ===
- "Fell From the Sun" 7" (1984) Serpent

=== Kendra Smith and David Roback and Keith Mitchell ===
- Fell From the Sun EP (1984) Serpent/Enigma (UK Indie #16)

=== With Rainy Day ===
- Rainy Day (1984) Llama/Rough Trade
- "I'll Keep It With Mine" (1984) Rough Trade (UK Indie #36)

=== With Opal ===
- "Northern Line" 12" EP (1986) One Big Guitar (UK Indie #17)
- Happy Nightmare Baby (1987) SST
- Early Recordings (1989) Serpent/Rough Trade

=== With The Guild of Temporal Adventurers ===
- Kendra Smith Presents the Guild of Temporal Adventurers mini-LP (1992) Fiasco

=== Solo ===
- The Guild of Temporal Adventurers (1992) Fiasco
- Five Ways of Disappearing (1995) 4AD

"Alle Morgens Parties" from Cinnamon Girl/Alle Morgens Parties, The Dream Syndicate/Kendra Smith (1987) The Bob Magazine #31 (promo)
"Stille Im Meine Hamburg" from Stille Im Meine Hamburg/Clothesline, Kendra Smith/Keith Levene & Hillel Slovak (1990) Overzealous Editions
"Bold Marauder" from All Virgos are Mad (1994) 4AD
"Valley Of The Morning Sun" (1995) Warner Bros. (promo only)
"Heart and Soul" from A Means to an End: The Music of Joy Division (1995) Warner Bros.
"Moon Boat" from Leave No Trace (2018)
