= Fade into You =

1993 single by Mazzy Star

Single by Mazzy Star

from the album So Tonight That I Might See
- B-side: "I'm Gonna Bake My Biscuit"; "Under My Car"; "Bells Ring" (acoustic); "Halah"
- Released: September 1993
- Genre: Alternative rock; dream pop; alternative country
- Length: 4:55
- Label: Capitol
- Composer: David Roback
- Lyricist: Hope Sandoval
- Producer: David Roback

Mazzy Star singles chronology
"Five String Serenade" (1993)	"Fade into You" (1993)	"She's My Baby" (1995)

Audio sample
- Album version, as it appeared on So Tonight That I Might See: file; help

"Fade into You" is a song by American band Mazzy Star from their second studio album, So Tonight That I Might See (1993). The song was written by lyricist Hope Sandoval and composer David Roback, who also served as producer.

The song reached number three on the US Billboard Modern Rock Tracks chart in 1994 and is Mazzy Star's only single to appear on the Billboard Hot 100 and Cash Box Top 100 charts, peaking at numbers 44 and 33. The song also charted at number 48 on the UK Singles Chart and number three in Iceland. It has appeared on several decade-best and all-time lists from publications such as Rolling Stone and Pitchfork. In 2025, the song eclipsed one billion plays on Spotify.

== Reception ==
In 2021, Rolling Stone ranked "Fade into You" at number 468 on its list of "The 500 Greatest Songs of All Time". Pitchfork included the song at number 19 on their list of the "Top 200 Tracks of the 90s". Listeners of Australian alternative music radio station Triple J ranked the song the 32nd greatest of 1994. Evan Rytlewski of Pitchfork conferred the title of "the dreamiest single of the '90s" on the track. In August 2025, United States vice president JD Vance said that "Fade Into You" was probably his "favorite song of the entire 90s rock era." That November, the song reached over a billion plays on Spotify.

Paste named it one of the best 100 songs of the 1990s and said it "sounds the way nostalgia feels, velveteen and aching and lush, a weighted blanket for the soul. Hope Sandoval sings like she's half-asleep and heartbroken about it, every syllable trailing off into that slow-motion haze of slide guitar, brushed drums, and tambourine."

== Music videos ==
Two music videos were made for "Fade into You". The first was directed by Merlyn Rosenberg and premiered on MTV's late-night alternative rock program 120 Minutes in October 1993, a few weeks after the album's release. Known as the Black and White version for its monochromic content throughout, the intentionally grainy, distorted footage shows the band performing in a darkened Burlesque-era ballroom, and is interspersed with footage of Sandoval and Roback at various sites around San Francisco, including the All Seasons Hotel (now the Crescent Hotel) and neighboring Stockton Street tunnel, coupled with genuine footage of the same sites shot in the 1930s.

The second music video was directed by Kevin Kerslake and first aired in March 1994. The video features the band performing in front of a projection screen depicting white clouds in a black sky, and is interlaced with slow-motion footage of the band in various locales in the Mojave Desert. The tree that can be seen in the video behind Sandoval could still be seen standing in 2024. It has the initials JC and SW carved into the tree in tribute to a deep connection of two of the bandmates. It is located just off of Route 66. Conversely, the old building seen in the video has decayed significantly and is partially collapsed, though it can still be found off of Interstate 40. Only the first music video was broadcast internationally.

== Track listings ==
All songs were written and composed by Hope Sandoval and David Roback except where noted.

- US and Australasian CD single
1. "Fade into You" – 4:52
2. "I'm Gonna Bake My Biscuit" – 3:37 (Minnie McCoy)
3. "Under My Car" – 3:35
4. "Bells Ring" (acoustic version) – 4:36
- US cassette single
1. "Fade into You" – 4:52
2. "Halah" – 3:12
- UK CD single
1. "Fade into You"
2. "Blue Flower" (Peter Blegvad, Anthony Moore)
3. "I'm Gonna Bake My Biscuit" (McCoy)
- UK 10-inch vinyl
1. "Fade into You"
2. "Five String Serenade" (album version) (Arthur Lee)
3. "Under My Car"
4. "Bells Ring" (acoustic version)
- Australian cassette single
1. "Fade into You" (LP version) – 4:52
2. "I'm Gonna Bake My Biscuit" (McCoy) – 3:37
- US limited-edition in-store play CD
1. "Fade into You" (album version)
2. "Into Dust" (live from MTV Europe)
3. "Ride It On" (live from MTV Europe)
4. "Ghost Highway" (live from MTV Europe)
5. "Blue Light" (live from MTV Europe)
6. "I'm Gonna Bake My Biscuit" (McCoy)
7. "Under My Car"
8. "Bells Ring" (acoustic version)
9. "Fade into You"

== Charts ==
=== Weekly charts ===
1994–1995 weekly chart performance for "Fade into You"
Chart (1994–1995)	Peak position
Australia (ARIA)	72
Canada Top Singles (RPM)	83
Iceland (Íslenski Listinn Topp 40)	3
Scottish Singles Sales (Official Charts)	54
UK Singles (Official Charts)	48
US Billboard Hot 100	44
US Alternative Airplay (Billboard)	3
US Pop Airplay (Billboard)	19
US Cash Box Top 100	33

2025–2026 weekly chart performance for "Fade into You"
Chart (2025–2026)	Peak position
Global 200 (Billboard)	106
Greece International (IFPI)	28
Israel International Airplay (Media Forest)	20
Lithuania (AGATA)	74
Netherlands (Single Tip)	12
Norway (IFPI Norge)	98
Portugal (AFP)	149
Sweden (Sverigetopplistan)	81
Switzerland (Schweizer Hitparade)	96

=== Year-end charts ===
Year-end chart performance for "Fade into You"
Chart (1994)	Position
Iceland (Íslenski Listinn Topp 40)	51
US Modern Rock Tracks (Billboard)	18

== Certifications ==
Certifications and sales for "Fade into You"
Region	Certification	Certified units/sales
Denmark (IFPI Danmark)	Platinum	90,000^{‡}
Germany (BVMI)	Gold	300,000^{‡}
Italy (FIMI)	Gold	50,000^{‡}
New Zealand (RMNZ)	4× Platinum	120,000^{‡}
Portugal (AFP)	Platinum	25,000^{‡}
Spain (Promusicae)	Gold	30,000^{‡}
United Kingdom (BPI)	Platinum	600,000^{‡}
Streaming
Greece (IFPI Greece)	2× Platinum	4,000,000^{†}
^{‡} Sales+streaming figures based on certification alone.^{†} Streaming-only figures based on certification alone.

== Release history ==
Release dates and formats for "Fade into You"
Region	Date	Format(s)	Label(s)	Ref.
United States	September 1993	Modern rock radio	Capitol	
United States	April 1994	CD	Capitol	
United Kingdom	August 15, 1994	10-inch vinyl; CD	Capitol	
Australia	October 10, 1994	CD; cassette	Capitol	

== Cover versions ==
- The Irish rock band Inhaler released a cover of the song in 2020.
- American indie singer Perfume Genius released a cover of the song in 2020.
- The American emo band American Football released a cover of the song with singer Miya Folick in 2022.
- The Australian singer Mallrat released a cover of the song in 2022.
- The American rock band Sponge released a cover of the song in 2024.
- The Australian alt rock band the Rubens released a cover of the song in 2024.

== Usage in media ==
In 2013, Vulture named "Fade into You" the most overused song in film and television, giving examples such as Gilmore Girls, CSI: Crime Scene Investigation, The Following, Psych, Starship Troopers and End of Watch. The song was used in several additional films and television shows, such as Yellowjackets, Virgin River, Dopesick, Catherine Called Birdy, and Off Campus.
