= Keith Mitchell (musician) =

Musical artist (1951–2017)

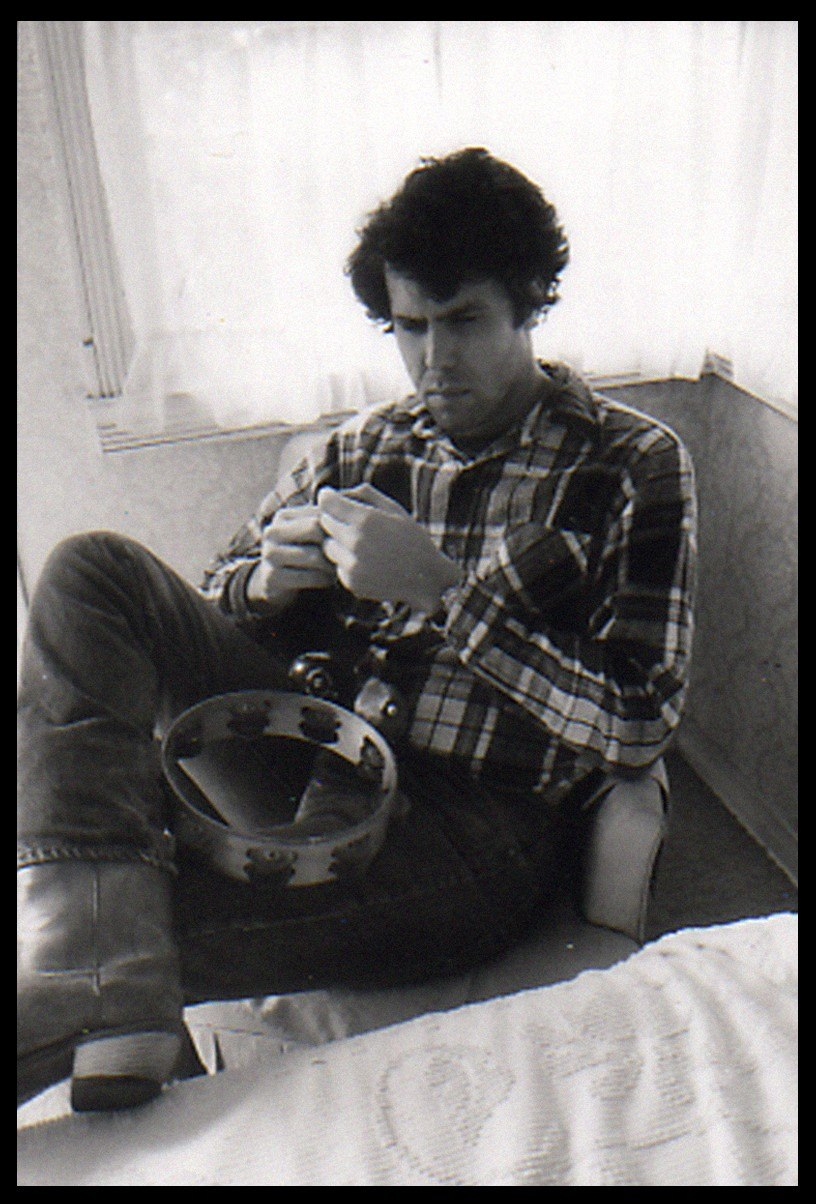

Background information
- Born: June 16, 1951; Long Beach, California, U.S.
- Origin: Long Beach, California, U.S.
- Died: May 14, 2017 (aged 65) Long Beach, California, U.S.
- Genres: Rock; Alternative rock; Dream pop; Punk rock
- Occupations: Drummer; songwriter
- Instruments: Drums; guitar; tuba
- Years active: 1978–2017
- Formerly of: Monitor; Chris Cacavas & Junkyard Love; Green on Red; Romans; Clay Allison; Opal; Mazzy Star

Keith Mitchell (June 16, 1951 — May 14, 2017) was an American musician, best known as the longtime drummer of Mazzy Star. He was previously a member of Opal, and its predecessor Clay Allison. While Mitchell first played guitar and tuba, it was the drums that became his instrument of choice as he played in a wide range of bands throughout his career.

== Early life ==
Keith Mitchell was born in Long Beach, California. He attended both Millikan and Wilson High Schools, and was an active member of the Boy Scouts and the Tribe of Tahquitz — experiences that nurtured his adventurous spirit and early exposure to music. According to his son Paul Mitchell, Mitchell's musical journey began at a young age. He played several instruments including guitar and tuba, but it was during his time as a Boy Scout that he picked up the drums, sparking a passion that would define his life's work. His enthusiasm for music was matched by a lifelong curiosity and love of learning, qualities he carried with him both on and off the stage.

== Career ==
Mitchell began playing in various cover bands at bars. Eventually, he formed a country western band and toured nationally, at which point he learned he was going to become a father. His entry to the Los Angeles underground music scene came in the late 1970s through his involvement with Monitor, an experimental band known for its polyrhythmic arrangements. Guitarist Juan Gomez recalled Keith Mitchell's unconventional entrance into the group: "I said, 'How's the drummer search going?' and the reply was, 'Oh, we found this real oddball guy. He's just got all kinds of character.' 'How's his playing?' I asked. 'Oh, I don't know. But he's in.' ...And turned out to be a hell of a drummer."

In the early '80s, Mitchell joined the Romans, a band that started as a thrash punk outfit and later evolved into what many consider the first alt-country band. With his ability to adapt, skill and versatility, Keith was compared by his bandmates to "the Buddy Rich of punk rock." Alongside Juan Gomez, Keith then joined Clay Allison in mid-'83 — a project led by guitarist David Roback following the dissolution of Rain Parade. Gomez departed, and the group evolved into the band Opal, marking the beginning of Mitchell's long-running partnership with David Roback and, later, vocalist Hope Sandoval in Mazzy Star. As Mazzy's drummer, Mitchell contributed to all four of the band's studio albums and took part in every tour since 1990.

Outside of Mazzy Star, Mitchell performed with a wide range of bands including Billy Wisdom, Buffy's Ghost, Clay Allison (pre-Opal), Debt of Nature, Green on Red, The Hesitations, Hyena, Johanna Went, Miranda Lee Richards, Opal, and The Tikis, marking a musical versatility and understanding of genres. Despite the demands of touring, he remained connected to his family. His son Paul Mitchell recalled how his father immersed him in a wide range of cultural and musical experiences, describing him not only as a gifted musician, but also as a curious and generous seeker of knowledge.

== Death and tribute ==
Mitchell died on May 14, 2017, at age 65, after a short battle with cancer. He is survived by his sons Paul Mitchell and Kieran Matias, his mother Charlotte Mitchell, his siblings Craig, Brian, and Mary Ellen Mitchell, and a large extended family including five grandchildren. A celebration of his life was held on June 17 at Rancho Los Alamitos. In his honor, a memorial fund was established to support the percussion program at Cal State Long Beach's Bob Cole Conservatory of Music.

Our hearts are broken. We have lost the much beloved Keith Mitchell, a very talented and amazing drummer that we have had the privilege to work with for many years. He will live in all of our hearts forever. We'll miss you Big Fella.
