= Hope Sandoval =

American singer (born 1966)

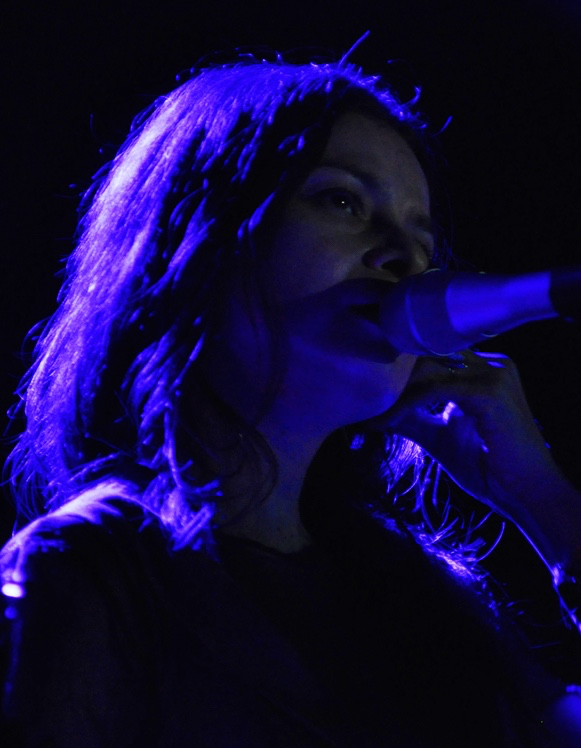
- Sandoval performing in New York, 2010

Background information
- Born: June 24, 1966 (age 60); Los Angeles, California, U.S.
- Genres: Dream pop; psychedelic folk; shoegaze; alternative rock
- Occupations: Singer; songwriter
- Instruments: Vocals, percussion
- Years active: 1986–present
- Labels: Rough Trade; Capitol; Rhymes of an Hour; Sanctuary; Nettwerk
- Member of: Mazzy Star, Hope Sandoval & the Warm Inventions
- Website: hopesandoval.com

Hope Sandoval (born June 24, 1966) is an American singer and songwriter. She was the lead singer of Mazzy Star and is the lead singer of Hope Sandoval & the Warm Inventions.

She has collaborated with other artists, including the Jesus and Mary Chain, the Chemical Brothers and Massive Attack.

== Early life ==
Sandoval was born June 24, 1966, in Los Angeles to Mexican-American parents, and raised in East Los Angeles. Her father was a butcher, and her mother worked for a potato chip manufacturing company. She has one sibling and seven half-siblings. Her parents separated when she was a child, and she was raised primarily by her mother.

She attended Mark Keppel High School in Alhambra, but struggled socially and academically, and was placed in special education classes. She began to forgo her classes, instead staying home and listening to records. "It's just like anybody else — some people, most people don't wanna go to school. They just don't want to", Sandoval recalled. "I was just somebody who got away with it… There wasn't really anyone watching". She eventually dropped out of high school.

Sandoval took an interest in music at an early age, and at age 13 was particularly influenced by the Rolling Stones. In 1986, she formed the folk music duo Going Home with Sylvia Gomez and sent a demo tape to David Roback. He contacted the duo and suggested that he would "play guitar for you guys". The material recorded by Gomez, Sandoval and Roback has yet to be released.

== Career ==
=== Opal and Mazzy Star (1988–1996) ===
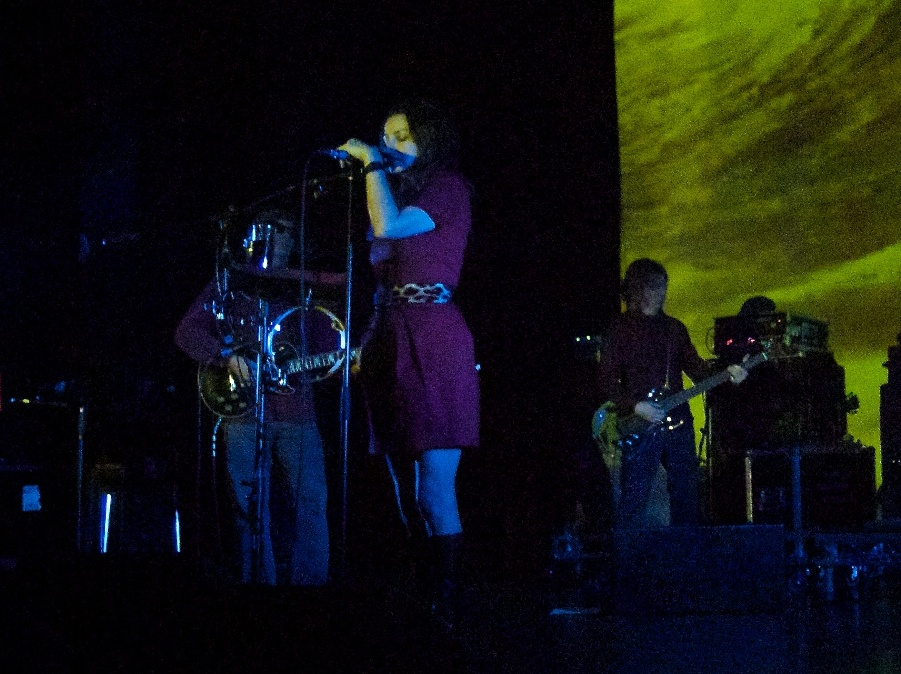
Sandoval performing live with Mazzy Star, 2012

Sandoval performed with the band Opal in the late 1980s alongside David Roback and long-time Roback collaborator Kendra Smith. After Smith's abrupt departure from the band, Sandoval took over lead vocals. At the end of the tour, Roback and Sandoval began writing together and formed the alternative rock band Mazzy Star.

The first Mazzy Star album, She Hangs Brightly, was released in 1990. While not a commercial success, this album did establish Mazzy Star as a band with a unique sound.

The band had a surprise breakthrough hit single released in October 1993. "Fade into You"—from the band's second album So Tonight That I Might See—was recorded one year before it became a success.

Mazzy Star went on hiatus in 1997.

=== Hope Sandoval and the Warm Inventions (2000–2010) ===
Sandoval formed the Warm Inventions in 2000 and released her first solo album Bavarian Fruit Bread in 2001, which she recorded with My Bloody Valentine drummer Colm Ó Cíosóig. The album differed in terms of theme, voice, and instrumentation from that of her work with Mazzy Star. Bert Jansch plays guitar on two tracks, and the album features two covers, "Butterfly Mornings" from the film The Ballad of Cable Hogue (1970) and Jesus and Mary Chain's "Drop". The Warm Inventions released two EPs, At the Doorway Again in 2000 and Suzanne in 2002, but did not win commercial success, with one video on MTV and little radio play. Sandoval recorded a song, "Wild Roses", for a compilation CD released by Air France, In the Air (2008).

Hope Sandoval and the Warm Inventions released their second album, Through the Devil Softly, on September 29, 2009.

Sandoval and her band were chosen by Matt Groening to perform at the edition of the All Tomorrow's Parties festival he curated in May 2010 in Minehead, England. The group also played the ATP New York 2010 music festival in Monticello, New York, in September 2010 at the request of the film director Jim Jarmusch.

=== Mazzy Star re-formation (2011–2014) ===
In 2009, Sandoval confirmed in an interview with Rolling Stone that Mazzy Star was still active: "It's true we're still together. We're almost finished [with the record]. But I have no idea what that means." In October 2011, the group released the single "Common Burn"/"Lay Myself Down", their first material in 15 years. The group stated that they had plans to release the album in 2012. In July 2013, "California", the first single from the new album was released. The album, Seasons of Your Day, was released in September 2013.

David Roback died in Los Angeles on February 24, 2020, from cancer at the age of 61.

=== Renewed solo activity (2016–present) ===
On March 9, 2016, it was confirmed that Hope Sandoval & the Warm Inventions would release a 7-inch vinyl single titled "Isn't It True" for Record Store Day 2016. The track also features Jim Putnam of Radar Bros. A music video for the song was released on April 19, and is dedicated to Richie Lee of Acetone. The Warm Inventions' third studio album, Until the Hunter, was released on November 4 through the band's own independent record label, Tendril Tales. A second single from the album, "Let Me Get There" featuring Kurt Vile, was released on September 23.

Sandoval contributed vocals to "I Don't Mind" by Psychic Ills, which was released on March 29, 2016. Four months later, Massive Attack released The Spoils, and the 2016 single "The Spoils", which was her third collaboration with the band, following "Paradise Circus" and "Four Walls". "The Spoils" music video was released on August 9, starring actress Cate Blanchett.

She covered "Big Boss Man" on Mercury Rev's 2019 album Bobbie Gentry's The Delta Sweete Revisited. Sandoval, along with artists such as Sting, Elton John, Dolly Parton, Eric Clapton and more, was featured on the 2024 reimagined duet version of Ghost on the Canvas, the 2011 farewell album of Glen Campbell who died in 2017.

== Musical and performance style ==
Sandoval's musical style is most often described as "sultry" dream pop driven by her "beautifully sleepy vocals." Mazzy Star's music is folk-inflected alternative rock and dream pop with a wash of psychedelic production, while the Warm Inventions omit the psychedelic sheen to form cleaner, tighter arrangements.

During live performances, Sandoval prefers to sing in near-darkness with only a dim backlight, playing the tambourine, harmonica, glockenspiel or shaker. She has a reputation for shyness. Her stage presence has been described as "idly withdrawn, barely acknowledging the audience".

== Discography ==
=== Mazzy Star ===
- She Hangs Brightly (1990)
- So Tonight That I Might See (1993)
- Among My Swan (1996)
- Seasons of Your Day (2013)

=== Hope Sandoval and the Warm Inventions ===
- Bavarian Fruit Bread (2001)
- Through the Devil Softly (2009)
- Until the Hunter (2016)

=== Collaborations ===
Sandoval has collaborated with numerous other artists.

- "Sometimes Always" by the Jesus and Mary Chain from Stoned & Dethroned (1994)
- "Perfume" by the Jesus and Mary Chain from Munki (1998)
- "Asleep from Day" by the Chemical Brothers from Surrender (1999)
- "Killing Smile" and "Help Yourself" by Death in Vegas from Scorpio Rising (2002)
- "All This Remains" by Bert Jansch from Edge of a Dream (2002)
- "Cherry Blossom Girl (Hope Sandoval Version)" by Air from "Cherry Blossom Girl" (2004)
- "Angels' Share" by Vetiver from Vetiver (2004)
- "Harmony" and "Papillon de Nuit" by Le Volume Courbe from I Killed My Best Friend (2005) (Note: I Killed My Best Friend also features contributions from Sandoval's Mazzy Star partner David Roback, as well as the Warm Inventions' Colm Ó Cíosóig and his former My Bloody Valentine bandmate Kevin Shields.)
- "Paradise Circus" by Massive Attack from Heligoland (2010)
- "Four Walls" by Massive Attack vs. Burial, non-album single (2011)
- "Not at All" by Dirt Blue Gene from Watergrasshill (2013)
- "I Don't Mind" by Psychic Ills from Inner Journey Out (2016)
- "The Spoils" by Massive Attack, non-album single (2016)
- "Big Boss Man" by Mercury Rev from Bobbie Gentry's The Delta Sweete Revisited (2019)
- "I'll Walk with You" by Elizabeth Hart from Songs for Tres (2021)
- "The Long Walk Home" by Glen Campbell on Duets - Ghosts on the Canvas Sessions (2024)
