= David Roback =

American musician (1958–2020)

- Born: David Edward Roback; April 4, 1958; Los Angeles, California, U.S.
- Origin: Brentwood, California, U.S.
- Died: February 24, 2020 (aged 61) Los Angeles, California, U.S.
- Genres: Dream pop; psychedelic folk; shoegaze; alternative rock
- Occupations: Guitarist; songwriter; record producer; actor
- Instruments: Guitar; piano; keyboards
- Years active: 1981–2019
- Formerly of: Unconscious; Rain Parade; Rainy Day; Opal; Mazzy Star

David Edward Roback (April 4, 1958 – February 24, 2020) was an American guitarist, songwriter and producer, best known as a founding member of the alternative rock band Mazzy Star.

== Early life and education ==
Roback was born on April 4, 1958, and he was raised in Los Angeles, a son of nurse Rosemary (née Hunter) and physician George Roback. He graduated from Palisades High School, before studying art at Carleton College and the University of California, Berkeley. He and his brother Stephen Roback, a bass guitarist, formed the band Unconscious alongside Susanna Hoffs, who would go on to become a member of the Bangles.

== Career ==
Roback was active in the Paisley Underground indie music scene in Los Angeles in the early to mid-1980s as leader of the band Rain Parade, which was popular on the local club circuit. Shortly after the release of Emergency Third Rail Power Trip, their debut album in 1983, Roback left Rain Parade to join Rainy Day, a collective featuring other musicians from the Paisley Underground. Their first and only album was issued in 1984, which also featured contributions from the Dream Syndicate vocalist Kendra Smith. The same year, Roback and Smith formed Clay Allison, changing that band name to Opal by the time they released Happy Nightmare Baby, their debut album in 1987.

While promoting the album, Smith acrimoniously exited the band while they were partway through a tour opening for the Jesus and Mary Chain. She was replaced by Hope Sandoval, but this lineup never released an album; they changed the name of the band to Mazzy Star in 1989. Mazzy Star released three albums in the 1990s: She Hangs Brightly (1990), So Tonight That I Might See (1993), and Among My Swan (1996), making their commercial breakthrough with the 1994 single "Fade into You" before going on hiatus.

In the years that followed, Roback produced and recorded music with other artists: He produced songs on Beth Orton's 1999 album Central Reservation and performed on Bert Jansch's 2006 album The Black Swan. Roback wrote and produced the songs that actress Maggie Cheung sang in the 2004 film Clean. He also played himself in the film. He spent much of his later life in Norway, where he collaborated with various musicians and created original music for art installations. He reunited with Sandoval to release Mazzy Star's fourth studio album in 2013, Seasons of Your Day, followed by the 2018 EP Still, which was promoted with a three-night residency at the Sydney Opera House. Prior to his death, Roback had been working with Kendra Smith on re-releases of Happy Nightmare Baby and a compilation of Opal EPs titled Early Recordings, both of which are "imminently" due for release via INgrooves.

== Death ==
Roback died in Los Angeles on February 24, 2020, from metastatic cancer. Numerous musicians paid tribute to him, including his Mazzy Star bandmate Hope Sandoval, Unconscious and Rainy Day bandmate Susanna Hoffs, Clairo, Jennifer O'Connor, Joe Pernice, Craig Wedren, Steve Wynn, Matthew Caws of Nada Surf, Doug Gillard of Guided by Voices, Grasshopper of Mercury Rev, J Mascis of Dinosaur Jr., Mac McCaughan of Superchunk, Colin Meloy of the Decemberists, Anton Newcombe of the Brian Jonestown Massacre, A. C. Newman of the New Pornographers, Simon Raymonde of Cocteau Twins, as well as bands the Pastels, Sleigh Bells and the Vacant Lots.

== Impact and legacy ==
Roback's songwriting and guitar work has, according to Alexis Petridis of The Guardian, been highly influential, "most strikingly on Lana Del Rey: you could clearly detect [Mazzy Star's] shadow ... on her breakthrough album Born to Die, a more explicit examination of the LA darkness that had always lurked somewhere in Mazzy Star's sound. In turn, Del Rey went on to exert a vast influence of her own, which meant that one of the most reticent bands in recent history ended up becoming a part of latter-day pop's musical DNA."
