= Total Strife Forever =

Studio album by East India Youth
- Released: January 13, 2014
- Genre: Indietronica; synthpop; experimental; ambient
- Length: 51:00
- Label: Stolen Recordings

East India Youth chronology
Total Strife Forever (2014)	Culture of Volume (2015)

Professional ratings
Aggregate scores
Source	Rating
Metacritic	81/100
Review scores
Source	Rating
Clash	9/10
Drowned in Sound	9/10
The Line of Best Fit	9/10
Mojo	4/5 stars
musicOMH	4.5/5 stars
NME	8/10
Q	4/5 stars
The Skinny	5/5 stars
Uncut	9/10
Under the Radar	8.5/10

Total Strife Forever is the debut album by the electronic musician East India Youth. It was released on January 13, 2014 by Stolen Recordings. The album was nominated for the 2014 Mercury Prize.

The cover of Total Strife Forever was designed by Kohhei Matsuda (of Bo Ningen) and features a portrait of William Doyle by artist Tida Bradshaw.

The album title is a pun on the Foals album Total Life Forever.

== Track listing ==
No.	Title	Length
1.	"Glitter Recession"	4:19
2.	"Total Strife Forever I"	6:35
3.	"Dripping Down"	4:11
4.	"Hinterland"	6:16
5.	"Heaven, How Long"	6:09
6.	"Total Strife Forever II"	2:55
7.	"Looking for Someone"	4:15
8.	"Midnight Koto"	3:13
9.	"Total Strife Forever III"	4:41
10.	"Song for a Granular Piano"	4:01
11.	"Total Strife Forever IV"	4:25
Total length:		51:00

== Chart positions ==
Chart (2014)	Peak position
UK Albums Chart	85
UK Dance Chart	14
UK Indie Albums Chart	9
UK Indie Breakers Chart	3
UK Vinyl Albums Chart	6
