= Little Death (album) =

Studio album by Pete and the Pirates
- Released: February 18, 2008
- Genre: Indie rock
- Length: 35:56
- Label: Stolen Recordings
- Producer: Gareth Parton

Professional ratings
Review scores
Source	Rating
The Guardian	3/5 stars
Metro	4/5 stars
NME	8/10 stars
Pitchfork	8/10 stars
Time Out	5/6 stars
The Times	4/5 stars

Little Death is the debut album by English indie rock group Pete and the Pirates, released on February 17, 2008. Recorded and mixed by producer Gareth Parton (The Go! Team, Foals, The Breeders) at The Fortress Studios, London.

== Critical reception ==
Little Death has an average rating of 74 on metacritic.com. The album was described by NME as "perfect pop without the pretence". Pitchfork gave Little Death an 8 out of 10 saying "Even if you'd be loathe [sic] to admit it to your friends, "Dry Wings", with lines like, "Time for bed/ Find a girl and go to bed/ Close your eyes/ Stars are falling from the sky," is mighty affecting—a winking galaxy of jangled wist, sweet, staggered harmonies and a gawky, yearning sense of wonder". The Guardian gave the album 3 out of 5 stars saying, "this eclecticism does make Little Death feel like the work of several different bands. No matter. There is imagination to spare here, as well as the occasional winning lyric."

== Track listing ==
1. "Ill Love" - 2:42
2. "Come On Feet" - 2:38
3. "She Doesn't Belong To Me" - 1:59
4. "Lost In The Woods" - 2:19
5. "Moving" - 2:26
6. "Knots" - 2:13
7. "Humming" - 2:58
8. "Dry Wings" - 2:26
9. "Mr. Understanding" - 3:14
10. "Bears" - 2:55
11. "Eyes Like Tar" - 2:50
12. "Song For Today" - 4:06
13. "Bright Lights" - 3:10
