= Grimm Grimm =

Experimental music project

- Born: Koichi Yamanoha; Tokyo, Japan
- Genres: Experimental pop; Neofolk
- Occupations: Musician, singer-songwriter, producer
- Instruments: Vocals; guitar; bass; theremin; synthesizer
- Years active: 2013–present
- Labels: ATP Recordings; P-Vine Records; Hostess Entertainment; Pickpocket Records; Birdfriend; Tip Top Recordings; Takuroku; Magniph; Myths of the Far Future
- Website: grimmgrimm.com

Grimm Grimm is the musical project of London-based songwriter, composer and record producer Koichi Yamanoha.

His work is performed in both English and Japanese and has involved collaborations with artists including Lori Goldston, Lætitia Sadier, Le Volume Courbe, Bo Ningen, Josephine Foster, and Klein.

== Biography ==
Yamanoha is originally from West Tokyo, Japan, and is the former frontman of the noise-pop group, Screaming Tea Party (2006-2010) in London. The band released two EPs through Stolen Recordings in the United Kingdom.

In 2014, Yamanoha launched Grimm Grimm with the single, Kazega Fuitara Sayonara / Tell the Truth, through Pickpocket Records, the label founded by Kevin Shields and Charlotte Marionneau in collaboration with Honest Jon's. His debut album, Hazy Eyes Maybe (2015), was released on ATP Recordings. Tracks from the album were used on the soundtrack for the documentary film Uncle Howard (2016) featuring William S. Burroughs and directed and produced by Aaron Brookner and Jim Jarmusch.

His second album, Cliffhanger, was released in June 2018. The album was mixed and produced with Berlin-based producer and musician, Goh Nakada. The following year, a 7" vinyl of remixes by British musician Klein and Japanese producer Killer-Bong was issued through Birdfriend, a label managed by Koshiro Hino.

Yamanoha announced the release of his third studio album, Ginormous, on 28 February 2020. The album was mixed and produced with Grammy-nominated producer Marta Salogni and features guest appearances by Paz Maddio and Lætitia Sadier. Grimm Grimm and his ensemble appeared on BBC 6 Music on 19 February 2020 where they were interviewed and performed three songs live in session.

A mixtape, Untitled II, was released via his own label, Myths of the Far Future in 2024. Several tracks from the project were first shared digitally in 2021 by Cafe Oto’s in-house label during the COVID-19 lockdowns. The full collection was later issued as a limited edition on tape and vinyl. The mixtape features guest contributions from several artists, including British musicians Naima Karlsson and Serafina Steer.

In June 2025, video game designer Hideo Kojima announced that several songs by Grimm Grimm would feature in the PlayStation 5 game Death Stranding 2: On the Beach. Developed by Kojima Productions and published by Sony Interactive Entertainment, the game includes a cameo appearance by Yamanoha.

Eternalise, his fourth album, was released in March 2026. The album features guest appearances by Lori Goldston, Paz Maddio, Eiko Ishibashi, Tatsuhisa Yamamoto, Jem Doulton and Josephine Foster, and was mastered by Amir Shoat. Selected tracks from the album were featured in Death Stranding 2: On the Beach.

Grimm Grimm has toured with and supported artists such as Cate Le Bon, Simon Finn, Dinosaur Jr, Yeah Yeah Yeahs, Wire and The Undertones. He has also played at multiple music festivals around the world including Le Guess Who? in Utrecht, Netherlands, Green Man Festival in Wales, Sonic Festival in Belgium, and All Tomorrow's Parties in England.

== Musical style ==
The Quietus described the rhythmic composition of Yamanoha's 2020 album, Ginormous, as "Accented with percussion that comes in small clicks and creaks, metronomic rhythms, clacking, cranking sounds like wind-up gears, which sometimes stand in for more conventional drumming, or, as on 'Kyowa Amenohidesu', can create a halting, glitchy tempo." "Throughout his releases, Yamanoha has explored various nuances within his style, blending elements of baroque folk with futurist lyricism, drawing inspiration from English "Infinite canon" forms, where repetitive patterns create an endless, cyclical feel. The melodies often linger long after the songs have ended, haunting the ear like half-remembered nursery rhymes." Clash reviewed, Hazy Eyes Maybe, describing it as "It might seem a simple, acoustic album, but scrape beneath the surface and there lie intricately crafted layers of mournful, morphing, melancholic hooks".

== Discography ==
=== Albums ===
- Hazy Eyes Maybe (ATP Recordings | P-Vine Records, 2015)
- Cliffhanger (Some Other Planet | Hostess Entertainment, 2018)
- Ginormous (Tip Top Recordings | Magniph, 2020)
- Untitled II [mixtape] (Myths of the Far Future, 2024)
- Eternalise (Myths of the Far Future, 2026)

=== EPs ===
- Grimm Grimm & Tapers (So I Buried, 2014)
- Recalling (Takuroku, 2021)
- Songs For Death Stranding 2: On The Beach (Myths of the Far Future, 2025)

=== Singles ===
- Kazega Fuitara Sayonara / Tell The Truth - 7" Vinyl (Pickpocket Records, 2014)
- Hazy Eyes Maybe / Knowing (ft. Bo Ningen) - 7" Vinyl (ATP Recordings | P-Vine Records, 2015)
- Take Me Down To Coney Island / Ballad of Cell Membrane (Some Other Planet | Hostess Entertainment, 2018)
- Ghost of Madame Legros (Tip Top Recordings | Magniph, 2019)
- Something in Your Way (Tip Top Recordings | Magniph, 2019)
- We've Never Been This Far Before (Tip Top Recordings | Magniph, 2020)
- Deathly (Myths of the Far Future, 2025)
- Let's Not Say Another Word (Myths of the Far Future, 2025)
- Mothers (Myths of the Far Future, 2025)
- Zoning (Myths of the Far Future, 2026)

=== Remix ===
- Kazega Fuitara Sayonara Remixes: Remixed by Klein | Killer-Bong - 7" Vinyl (Birdfriend, 2019)

=== Compilation ===
- Rough Trade Counter Culture 15 CD (Rough Trade, 2015)
- Death Stranding 2: On The Beach - Songs From The Video Game LP (Mondo Records, 2026)
