= Until the Hunter =

Studio album by Hope Sandoval & the Warm Inventions
- Released: 4 November 2016
- Genre: Alternative rock
- Length: 58:56
- Label: Tendril Tales
- Producer: Hope Sandoval; Colm Ó Cíosóig

Hope Sandoval & the Warm Inventions chronology
Through the Devil Softly (2009)	Until the Hunter (2016)

Singles from Until the Hunter
- 1. "Isn't It True" Released: 16 April 2016; 2. "Let Me Get There" Released: 23 September 2016

Until the Hunter is the third studio album from Hope Sandoval & the Warm Inventions. It was released on 4 November 2016 and is their first album since 2009's Through the Devil Softly. It is Hope Sandoval and Colm Ó Cíosóig's first collaboration since the release of Mazzy Star's Seasons of Your Day and My Bloody Valentine's m b v in 2013.

The album features contributions from songwriters Mariee Sioux and Kurt Vile, Jim Putnam of Radar Bros., street musician and multi-instrumentalist Michael Masley, as well as Irish band Dirt Blue Gene, who also appeared on Through the Devil Softly. The album was mixed at Cauldron Studios in Dublin and mastered by Mark Chalecki in Los Angeles.

== Background and recording ==
Until the Hunter is the band's first studio album since Through the Devil Softly (2009). In the years that followed, both Sandoval and Ó Cíosóig resumed touring with their original bands – Mazzy Star and My Bloody Valentine, respectively – with those two bands each releasing their first new studio albums in approximately two decades in 2013, Seasons of Your Day and m b v. Work began on Until the Hunter in 2014, with Sandoval and Ó Cíosóig composing new material in Berkeley, California. They later reconvened in Dublin, Ireland to hold recording sessions, where they were joined by Irish band Dirt Blue Gene. This band – which consists of Charles Cullen, Dave Brennan, Al Browne, Mick Whelan and Alan Montgomery – also contributed to Through the Devil Softly, and performed as The Warm Inventions' backing band for its world tour until 2010.

The record features performances from several guest musicians, among them Kurt Vile, whom Sandoval and Ó Cíosóig invited to take part after hearing his music while shopping at a drum store in Dublin, and American singer-songwriter Mariee Sioux. It also features multi-instrumentalist Michael Masley performing gong and nyckelharpa on several tracks. He was asked to participate after Sandoval encountered him busking outside Berkeley's BART station. Sandoval said: "We walked by and heard this beautiful music. [...] He basically reinvents instruments. He has this gong, and he drills a hole in the middle of [it] and does all these crazy sounds. [...] He has all this weird, crazy stuff that he does to create these amazing sounds, and he tells you, 'You're never gonna hear this sound again. Nobody is going to give you this sound!' You need to Google him now. He'll blow your mind."

The album was recorded in various locations, including Sandoval's Berkeley residence; an unnamed college and two Martello towers in Dublin, which Ó Cíosóig rented through Airbnb. The tower's circular shape helped to enhance the band's recordings, with Ó Cíosóig explaining: "Because of the circular dimensions, the reverb inside died naturally, and it had this curve; it didn't bounce around like a square box. The resonance in the towers suggested sounds that might not have been there. They brought out existing sounds more. If you have parallel walls, the reverb keeps on going, and we had a nice natural decay that let the music just breathe inside it."

On 15 September 2017, the band released the "Son of a Lady" EP via digital outlets and on 10" vinyl, which features three unreleased songs from the Until the Hunter recording sessions, and an acoustic rendition of "Let Me Get There", sung entirely by Sandoval.

== Composition and style ==
The album's title is derived from an old African proverb, "Until the lions have their own historians, the history of the hunt will always glorify the hunter." "Into the Trees" is the album's first song. It is a nine-minute long, drone-based alternative rock song. It begins with a predominantly featured Philicorda organ, performed by Sandoval, which is then followed by Ó Cíosóig's psychedelic-influenced drum work. It was one of the first songs the two recorded for Until the Hunter, and was written and recorded during a single session at the Martello Towers. Sandoval has described it as her favorite track on the album, and has expressed interest in releasing its original demo recording, which far exceeds the nine-minute duration of the album version. Several guest musicians then contributed to the track at later recording sessions in Berkeley, including Mariee Sioux, who features as a backing vocalist on the song's latter half. As it progresses, Michael Masley's distinctive instrumentation becomes more prominent.

The record contains several songs which have been compared to some of Sandoval's previous work with Mazzy Star. "The Peasant" has been compared to the band's 1994 single "Fade into You", and is the only song on the album to be composed solely by Sandoval. A review for Uncut said that the album's sixth track, "Treasure", is evocative of the material found on So Tonight That I Might See (1993), describing it as "both utterly wasted and desolately beautiful, [it] ends with a glorious slow fade, like a seaside sunset." Elsewhere, Until the Hunter contains material which has been ascribed to a diverse array of musical styles. "A Wonderful Seed" has been likened to a sea shanty, and "Let Me Get There" was described as "all flickering soul licks, steamy organ and sassy vocal trade-offs". The track is a seven-minute long duet with Kurt Vile, although its lyrics were written solely by Sandoval. "Day Disguise" is a sparse, nursery rhyme-like mid-tempo ballad, which features a pedal steel guitar prominently in its instrumentation. The distinctive percussion found on "The Hiking Song" is the sound of Ó Cíosóig throwing joss sticks into a wooden box. "Isn't It True" is the most uptempo track on the album, and is one of the fastest songs in Sandoval's entire discography, with a BPM of 170. Album closer "Liquid Lady" is a psychedelic soul and blues-influenced rock song, with a 3/4 time signature.

== Release and promotion ==
The band first teased the album with the single "Isn't It True" on Record Store Day 2016. Its music video, which was dedicated to Richie Lee of Acetone, was released on 19 April, and features vintage photographs and clips that the band described as "lost and found memories". A second single, "Let Me Get There", was released on 23 September. That same day, the album's track listing, artwork, and release date were also revealed. A music video for the song was released in early October. Directed by Sandoval and featuring sculptures created by her brother, it was inspired by the works of Maya Deren. "A Wonderful Seed" was released for streaming on Spotify from 21 October.

The album was released on 4 November in various formats, including CD, 2× vinyl and digital download. Editions of the album sold at Rough Trade stores in the UK contained a bonus disc featuring the album's two B-sides. They also released a translucent green vinyl edition, which was limited to 700 copies. The band are touring since March 2017.

== Critical reception ==
Professional ratings
Aggregate scores
Source	Rating
AnyDecentMusic?	7.3/10
Metacritic	79/100
Review scores
Source	Rating
AllMusic	4/5 stars
Consequence of Sound	B
Financial Times	3/5 stars
The Irish Times	3/5 stars
The Line of Best Fit	7.5/10
Mojo	4/5 stars
MusicOMH	4/5 stars
Q	3/5 stars
Spectrum Culture	4.5/5 stars
Uncut	8/10

Until the Hunter received widespread acclaim from critics upon release. At Metacritic, which assigns a normalized rating out of 100 to reviews from mainstream publications, the album received an average score of 79, based on 10 reviews. It also holds an aggregate score of 7.3 out of 10 at AnyDecentMusic?, based on 14 reviews.

Numerous publications praised the album for its production, as well as Sandoval's vocals, which Graeme Thomson of Uncut compared to "One long sighing fall, it's not a voice designed to get the party started; rather, it slips exquisitely through the shadows of some eternal comedown." He went on to compliment the production for "[coalescing] around that voice, and its still-potent conjuring of beauty and darkness." Consequence of Sound also complimented its production, which he said enveloped Sandoval's vocals in "the many shades of gray between subtle warmth and sighing melancholy". MusicOMH said that the album "impresses with the bare minimum from start to finish. How they pack so much emotion and feel into so little is nothing short of magical." The Arts Desk gave the album a perfect score, calling it "a thing of some considerable beauty".

The Boston Globe writer Maura Johnston praised the record for its combination of differing genres, saying that the album "explores the textures that make up rock 'n' roll in depth, allowing listeners to burrow down with Sandoval's ghostly soprano lighting the way." Tim Sendra of AllMusic also praised its musical diversity, expansive arrangements and the "increased number of catchy songs [compared to the band's previous albums]." He summarized by writing: "Seven years is a long time to wait between albums, but if that's how long it takes to make the album as good as this is, then the wait was worth it." A review for Spectrum Culture expressed a similar sentiment, and went on to call it one of the best albums of the year. The Line of Best Fit described it as an immersive and rewarding album which proved that side-projects could be more than "mere rock star folly". BrooklynVegan compared the album to Seasons of Your Day, suggesting that both releases had a timeless quality, explaining: "That contrast between having one foot in the very old and one in the very new is part of why the music remains so essential. [Both albums feel] classic and fresh at the same time."

=== Accolades ===
Critic/Publication	Accolade	Rank	Ref.
CKUA Radio	Essential Albums of 2016	29	
Graeme Virtue from The Guardian	The Best Albums and Tracks of 2016	1	
Piccadilly Records	Albums of the Year 2016	39	
Rough Trade	Albums of the Year 2016	35	
John Mulvey from Uncut	Favourite Albums of 2016	108	

== Track listing ==
All tracks are written by Hope Sandoval and Colm Ó Cíosóig, except where noted.

No.	Title	Writer(s)	Length
1.	"Into the Trees"		9:03
2.	"The Peasant"	Sandoval	4:57
3.	"A Wonderful Seed"		4:18
4.	"Let Me Get There" (featuring Kurt Vile)		7:30
5.	"Day Disguise"		4:51
6.	"Treasure"	Sandoval; Charles Cullen	5:53
7.	"Salt of the Sea"		4:22
8.	"The Hiking Song"		4:28
9.	"Isn't It True"		3:05
10.	"I Took a Slip"		4:04
11.	"Liquid Lady"	Sandoval; Ó Cíosóig; Dave Brennan; Alan Montgomery	6:22
Total length:			58:56

Until the Hunter — Rough Trade bonus disc
No.	Title	Writer(s)	Length
1.	"That Spider"	Sandoval; Brennan	4:10
2.	"She's in the Wall"		3:31
Total length:			7:41

== Personnel ==
Credits adapted from AllMusic and the liner notes of Until the Hunter.

- Recorded in Berkeley, California and Dublin, Ireland
- Mixed by Hope Sandoval and Colm Ó Cíosóig at Cauldron Studios, Dublin
- Mastered by Mark Chalecki at Little Red Book Mastering, Los Angeles
- Published by Sand Devil Music (BMI)/Black Faun Music (BMI)

Musicians

- Hope Sandoval – vocals, backing vocals, lyricist, composer, keyboards, organ, vibraphone, percussion, production
- Colm Ó Cíosóig – composer, guitars, drums, engineering, production
- Dave Brennan – composer, guitars
- Al Browne – bass
- Charles Cullen – composer, guitars
- Michael Masley – gong, nyckelharpa
- Alan Montgomery – composer
- Jim Putnam – guitars, engineering
- Mariee Sioux – vocals, backing vocals
- Kurt Vile – vocals
- Mick Whelan – keyboards
- Ji Young-Moon – cello

Technical

- Barry Bödeker – artwork
- Frank Gironda – management
- Michael Manning – engineering
- Reto Peter – engineering

== Charts ==
Chart (2016)	Peak position
Belgian Albums (Ultratop Flanders)	47
Belgian Albums (Ultratop Wallonia)	66
Dutch Albums (Album Top 100)	139
French Albums (SNEP)	183
UK Album Sales (OCC)	85
UK Independent Albums (OCC)	20
UK Physical Albums (OCC)	83
UK Vinyl Albums (OCC)	20
US Heatseekers Albums (Billboard)	2
US Independent Albums (Billboard)	14
US Top Alternative Albums (Billboard)	14
US Top Rock Albums (Billboard)	25
US Indie Store Album Sales (Billboard)	4

== Release history ==
Region	Date	Format	Label	Distributor	Catalog #	Ref.
Worldwide	4 November 2016	CD; DI; vinyl	Tendril Tales	INgrooves	TT03	
