= Hope Springs Eternal =

Hope Springs Eternal is a phrase from the Alexander Pope poem "An Essay on Man".

Hope Springs Eternal may also refer to:

== Books ==
- Hope Springs Eternal, a novel by Edward O. Phillips
- Prairie River: Hope Springs Eternal, a 2005 book by Kristiana Gregory
- Hope Springs Eternal, the subtitle of Stephen King's 1982 novella Rita Hayworth and Shawshank Redemption

== Film ==
- Hope Springs Eternal (film), 2018
- "Hope Springs Eternal", an episode of Project Runway Canada (season 2)

== Video Games ==
Carol Reed: Hope Springs Eternal, a 2005 point and click adventure game by MDNA games.

== Music ==
- Hope Springs Eternal, a 1997 album by the band The Echoing Green
- "Hope Springs Eternal", a piano piece by Bruce Barth
- "Hope Springs Eternal", a single by the band The Sandkings
- "Hope Springs Eternal", a track from Hearts in Motion by Air Supply
- "Hope Springs Eternal", a track from Power of Eternity by Wishbone Ash
- "Hope Springs Eternal", a track from If You Want to Defeat Your Enemy Sing His Song by The Icicle Works
- "Hope Springs Eternal", a song from an album of the same name by Witness

== Poetry ==
- The phrase appears in the second stanza of the poem "Casey at the Bat" by Ernest Thayer

== See also ==
- Dum spiro spero, "while I breathe, I hope"
- Hope Springs (disambiguation)
- Springs Eternal
