= Tap Tap (band) =

- Origin: Reading, Berkshire, England
- Genres: Indie pop Indie rock
- Years active: 2006 – 2018
- Label: Stolen Recordings
- Past members: Thomas Sanders, Gregory Jones

Tap Tap were a British band fronted by Thomas Sanders, former lead singer of Pete and the Pirates and current frontman of Teleman.

== Lanzafame ==
Their debut album Lanzafame was released in 2006 on Catbird Records in the US and in 2007 on Stolen Recordings in the UK. Pitchfork compared it to 1980s New Zealand bands like Tall Dwarfs and gave it 7.7/10; Drowned In Sound gave it 8/10; and the Sunday Times reviewed it.

== On My Way ==
Tap Tap released their second album, On My Way, on 28 September 2009.

== Media appearances ==
Tap Tap were guests on Marc Riley's BBC Radio 6 music show on 27 October 2009.

In May 2010 Tap Tap recorded a song for 'Fast Forward', a World Cup 2010 compilation, called "Dry Dry Land" which was released by Dublin's Indiecater Records.

== Discography ==
=== Lanzafame ===
Tracks:

1. "100,000 Thoughts"
2. "She Doesn't Belong"
3. "To Our Continuing Friendship"
4. "Here Cometh"
5. "Little Match"
6. "On My Way"
7. "Talk Slowly"
8. "Off The Beaten Track"
9. "Way To Go Boy"
10. "The Reason I'm Here"
11. "What A Clever Thing To Say"

=== On My Way ===
Tracks:

1. "Autumn & Tea"
2. "Codeine"
3. "Dirty Sky"
4. "El Gusano"
5. "Straight To Hell"
6. "Half Moon Street"
7. "Queen Of Hearts"
8. "Star Crossed Idiots"
9. "Feelin Funny"
10. "Time Of War"
11. "Hey Missy"

=== B-sides/rarities ===
- "Don't Buy Her Things You Can't Afford"
- "Come On Feet"
- "Emma Will You Come Back"
- "Drink Like A Boy"
- "If You Can Dance"
- “Dry, Dry Land”
