= Through the Devil Softly =

Studio album by Hope Sandoval & The Warm Inventions
- Released: September 28, 2009
- Recorded: 2007–2009 in Northern California and County Wicklow, Ireland
- Genres: Alternative rock, psychedelic rock, folk rock
- Length: 51:29
- Label: Nettwerk
- Producers: Hope Sandoval, Colm Ó Cíosóig

Hope Sandoval & The Warm Inventions chronology
Bavarian Fruit Bread (2001)	Through the Devil Softly (2009)	Until the Hunter (2016)

Through the Devil Softly (2009) is the second studio album from Hope Sandoval & the Warm Inventions. Recorded between 2007 and 2009 in Northern California and Ireland, the album was released by Nettwerk on 28 September 2009 (see 2009 in music) - eight years after the release of their previous studio album, Bavarian Fruit Bread.

The set won critical acclaim for its dark and complex production, with the band employing unorthodox techniques such as sudden and abrupt time signature shifts, coupled with frequent use of "irrational" measure lengths. The production also utilized the use of intricate musical arrangements, with several songs on the album, such as "Sets the Blaze", "Thinking Like That", "Trouble" and "Blue Bird", featuring no discernible choruses.

A cover of the Syd Barrett track "Golden Hair", from his 1970 album The Madcap Laughs, was released with the March 2010 issue of Mojo magazine. Originally an acoustic song set to the words of James Joyce's poem "Lean Out of the Window", the track was radically altered and rearranged into a psychedelic rock piece, extending the original's duration from under two-minutes to over 6:30. On August 10, 2010, the song was released as a non-album single, backed with "Suddenly Beside You." The track served as the closing encore for every Warm Inventions show since its release.

== Production ==
=== Background ===
After the release of Bavarian Fruit Bread in 2001, Sandoval performed both lead and background vocals on projects by numerous other artists, most notably lead vocals on "Killing Smile" and "Help Yourself" on the 2002 album Scorpio Rising by Death In Vegas and the "Hope Sandoval Version" of Air's "Cherry Blossom Girl" in 2004. Sandoval also contributed backing vocals to the track "Angels' Share" on the 2004 self-titled album by Vetiver. As well as these, the vocals found on the album version of Mazzy Star's "Fade Into You" were used to create a new remix of the song by Richard X. The song, which also features Jarvis Cocker from the band Pulp, was re-titled "Into You" and released on his 2003 album Richard X Presents His X-Factor Vol. 1.

On November 3, 2003, Sandoval and Colm Ó Cíosóig performed live at the Queen Elizabeth Hall as part of the 60th birthday celebration held for folk musician Bert Jansch. The duo were joined on stage by Mazzy Star co-founder David Roback. Until their reformation in 2010, this was the only occasion since Mazzy Star's European tour of 2000 that Sandoval and Roback were known to have shared a stage together. Meanwhile, Sandoval and Jansch recorded together on two separate occasions prior to this event. Jansch performed guitar on two tracks found on Bavarian Fruit Bread, "Butterfly Mornings" and "Charlotte", while Sandoval had contributed lead vocals and wrote lyrics to the track "All This Remains" on Jansch's 2002 album Edge Of A Dream.

Following this, Sandoval and Roback — as well as Ó Cíosóig and his former My Bloody Valentine band-mate Kevin Shields — appeared on the 2005 debut album I Killed My Best Friend by Le Volume Courbe, performing instrumentation for the tracks "Harmony" and "Papillon de Nuit."

Later in 2005, Sandoval and Ó Cíosóig relocated to the Bay Area of San Francisco with the intention of taking an extended hiatus from recording and touring. In an interview with the San Francisco Examiner in 2009 she stated, "[...] we had a blast. We didn’t want to go at all, we thought we’d be miserable. But we ended up having so much fun there. We moved into a really amazing new house and we had parties, parties every weekend, with old friends popping in all the time. For some reason, everybody wanted to hang out with us."

=== Recording ===
Sometime in 2007, the pair moved to Berkeley to officially begin work on a follow-up to Bavarian Fruit Bread. By the middle of 2008, an album's worth of material had been recorded but Sandoval later remarked that, at that point, the album was "missing certain ingredients ... but we had time to really think about it because Colm went back out on tour with Kevin [Shields, of My Bloody Valentine]." Ó Cíosóig concluded, "[...] like when you're making a meal, and you taste it and there's that one ingredient that's not there. And when you finally add that extra ingredient, it makes it whole. So me going on tour gave us time to really digest it and add all the right things." In May 2008, Ó Cíosóig rejoined My Bloody Valentine for a 4-month long reunion tour, where he performed at festivals throughout Europe, Japan and New York, followed by several dates at smaller venues throughout the U.S. and Canada. Following this tour, Sandoval and Ó Cíosóig resumed recording together in the Wicklow Mountains in Ireland, where they were joined in studio for the first time by Dirt Blue Gene, a band that would later act as their touring band and with whom the majority of the album would be re-recorded. Final recording sessions took place in Sonoma County.

== Release and promotion ==
After almost 3 years of complete public inactivity from Sandoval, the track "Wild Roses" was released without prior notice or advertisement on the Air France compilation In The Air on June 29, 2008. This compilation was initially released in a limited capacity as a promotional CD, while a more general release was later given to the compilation digitally on sites such as iTunes and Amazon. Over a year passed before the album's first official single, "Blanchard", was released as a one-track digital download on August 4, 2009. Almost immediately following the announcement that the second Hope Sandoval & The Warm Inventions record would be released by Nettwerk, album track "Trouble" was released as a free-download on their website.

The release of the album was promoted in the U.S. with a 23-date tour running from September 18 to October 22, which was followed by a shorter 9-date tour of Europe running from October 29 to November 8. Following this, rumours of an impending follow-up album quickly started to circulate on the internet after confirmation from a source that the band had entered a studio on November 25 to record new material. The Japanese edition of the album was released on January 20, 2010, by Imperial Records, in co-operation with Nettwerk. This edition contains an unreleased bonus track, "The Buffalo."

Hope Sandoval's vocal contribution to Massive Attack's Heligoland album, "Paradise Circus," was released globally on February 8, 2010, while an X-rated film vignette, directed by Toby Dye and featuring one-time pornographic actress Georgina Spelvin, was released to promote the single. Elsewhere, Hope Sandoval & The Warm Invention's cover of the Syd Barrett track "Golden Hair" was released with the March 2010 issue of Mojo magazine. It was announced that the track would be released as the b-side to "Trouble," a single to be released later in both digital and 7" vinyl formats. A music video for "Trouble" was released on Q magazine's website at the beginning of April, where it was also named "Track of the Day." However, on August 10, 2010, "Golden Hair" was released as a stand-alone single with its own exclusive b-side — "Suddenly Beside You" — and was released solely as a digital download on 7Digital.

The group began the second leg of tour dates on May 6 with 6 dates in Ireland and the U.K. — including a date at the All Tomorrow's Parties Festival in Minehead, Somerset, curated by The Simpsons creator Matt Groening — followed by a date at the San Miguel Primavera Sound Festival in Barcelona and a further 4 dates in Australia which took them to Brisbane, Sydney, Melbourne and Perth. From August 6–14, the group performed at various festivals throughout Europe, including the Big Chill Festival held at Eastnor Castle in the U.K., the Dranouter Festival in Belgium, the Paradiso Festival in the Netherlands, the Vega Festival in Denmark and the La Route du Rock Festival in Saint-Malo, France. The group also performed September 5 at Kutsher's Country Club in Monticello, New York as part of the Jim Jarmusch-curated All Tomorrow's Parties Festival. The final confirmed date of this current tour took place on September 7 at the Great American Music Hall in San Francisco.

== Critical reception ==
"Blue Bird"
"You get the sense of Sandoval wandering through some abandoned, former gold-rush town, singing quietly to herself as the tumbleweeds bounce by." Pitchfork Media

"Satellite"
Album closer "Satellite," frequently lauded in reviews. NME's Emily Mackey commented the track "sounds like Billie Holiday's final radio transmission to troubled earthlings from her home beyond the stars."

Professional ratings
Review scores
Source	Rating
AllMusic	3.5/5 stars
BBC Music	(favorable)
Drowned in Sound	8/10 stars
The Guardian	4/5 stars
NME	7/10 stars
Pitchfork	(6.7/10)
PopMatters	8/10 stars
The Quietus	(favorable)
Rolling Stone	3/5 stars
Uncut	4/5 stars

Initial critical response to Through the Devil Softly was generally positive. At Metacritic, which assigns a normalized rating out of 100 to reviews from mainstream critics, the album has received an average score of 70 out of 100, based on 23 reviews.

Tim Sendra of AllMusic opined that the album "[sounds] like it was recorded at 2:00 a.m. in the middle of the kind of dream you never want to wake up from," and commented that Sandoval's voice "is exactly as beguiling and bewitching as ever." He also noted that "while this album doesn't exactly scream Top 40 or boast massive sing-along choruses, tracks like "For the Rest of Your Life," "Trouble," and "Fall Aside" have more of a sense of melody and forward motion [than the first Warm Inventions record], and "There's a Willow" comes magically close to a straightforward Mazzy Star-like gem," before summarising that "there is a depth of sound on the record that makes it seem like a deeply felt work of art. It sounds like it was worth the wait for Sandoval and Ó Cíosóig and it's a welcome return for fans of her music, and also for fans of late-night, melancholy balladry that will break your heart and ease you gently into dreams," giving the album a 3.5/5 rating.

Mark Powell of Drowned In Sound summarised his review by stating, "it doesn’t do this record a disservice to say that - from the broody amethyst tones of the cover art, right down to the final scrapes of mournful cello on "Sets The Blaze", or the old-time wireless crackle of pointedly Lynchian closer "Satellite" - Through the Devil Softly is an album whose drowsy currents you'll want to bob far away on, with no immediate concern over getting back," before giving the album an 8/10 rating. Album closer "Satellite" was also highlighted by NME magazine's Emily Mackey, who commented that the track "sounds like Billie Holiday's final radio transmission to troubled earthlings from her home beyond the stars, the gentlest, most desultory of strums and glances of keys backing Hope's vocal," before giving the album a 7/10 rating.

In one of the most negative reviews available online, Spin's Spencer Kornhaber commented that "a close listen reveals fine details, like the waterlogged, Eastern-tinged strumming of "Fall Aside" or the ghostly harmonies of "Blanchard," but to most listeners, though, Through the Devil Softly will simply function as a collection of breathily perfect lullabies," before awarding the album a 3/5 rating.

Joe Tangari from Pitchfork Media noted that "you get the sense of her [Sandoval] wandering through some abandoned, former gold-rush town, singing quietly to herself as the tumbleweeds bounce by." Tangari later commented, "one of the most interesting textures is found on "For the Rest of Your Life", which sounds constructed on a loop of an echoing, muted pick slide on the E string of a guitar. As the song fades after the verses it sounds as if it's wandering off into a void. That void is never far away on this record. Even at its warmest, there are ghosts in the air and cobwebs in the corners." Album closer "Satellite" was again highlighted, with Tangari commenting that Sandoval and Ó Cíosóig "take that distance to an extreme on muffled closer "Satellite," which is filtered to sound as if it's creaking out of the speakers after traveling for light years on the back of a radio wave. It opens and closes with the sound of waves on a beach. It's a pretty end for a pretty record, one that will put Mazzy Star fans in a comfortably familiar place and will probably just feel comfortable to everyone else. There's no real stand-out track - no "Fade Into You" for this decade - but it's a good listen while it lasts, a thing of slow, sad grace," awarding the album a 6.7/10 rating.

== Accolades ==
- Ranked #43 on Bookmat's list of the Top 100 Albums of '09.
- Ranked #26 on Lesinrocks's list of the Top 50 Albums of '09.
- Ranked #94 on Piccadilly Records list of the Top 100 Albums of '09.
- Ranked #35 on ClashMusic's list of the Top 40 Albums of '09.
- Ranked among Télérama's list of the Best 15 Albums of '09.

== Track listing ==
No.	Title	Writer(s)	Length
1.	"Blanchard"	Hope Sandoval	5:02
2.	"Wild Roses"	Sandoval, Colm Ó Cíosóig, Alan Browne	3:40
3.	"For the Rest of Your Life"	Sandoval	5:39
4.	"Lady Jessica and Sam"	Sandoval	4:30
5.	"Sets the Blaze"	Sandoval, Ó Cíosóig	2:31
6.	"Thinking Like That"	Sandoval, Charles Cullen	4:45
7.	"There's a Willow"	Sandoval, Ó Cíosóig, Cullen	5:07
8.	"Trouble"	Sandoval, Ó Cíosóig, Cullen, Browne, Dave Brennan	5:25
9.	"Fall Aside"	Sandoval, Ó Cíosóig	4:47
10.	"Blue Bird"	Sandoval	5:12
11.	"Satellite"	Sandoval, Ó Cíosóig	4:58
12.	"The Buffalo" (Japanese Bonus Track)	Sandoval, Ó Cíosóig	2:48
Total length:			54:17

== Personnel ==
- Hope Sandoval — vocals, instrumentation, recording, producing, mixing, photography
- Colm Ó Cíosóig — backing vocals, instrumentation, recording, producing, mixing
- Paul McQuillan — guitar
- Ji Young Moon — cello
- Suki Ewers — keyboards
- Sylvia Gomez — backing vocals
- With Dirt Blue Gene:
  - Charles Cullen — guitar, slide guitar
  - Dave Brennan — guitar
  - Alan Browne — bass
  - Mick Whelan — piano
  - Nigel Cullen — drums
- Technical Personnel:
  - Jim Putnam — mixing ("Wild Roses," "Lady Jessica and Sam" and "There's A Willow")
  - Dave Trumfio — mixing ("Trouble")
  - Mark Chaleki — mastering

== Sales and charts ==
The album debuted at number 160 on the U.S. Billboard 200 chart, selling 3,423 copies its first week.

Chart (2009)	Position
French Album Chart	69
U.S. Billboard 200	160
Billboard Top Heatseekers	6
Billboard Digital Album	102
Billboard Alternative Album	41
Billboard Alternative New Artist Album	1

== Release history ==
Region	Date	Label	Format	Catalog
United Kingdom	September 28, 2009	Nettwerk Records	CD	5-037703-084827
United States	September 29, 2009	Nettwerk Records	CD	0-6700-30848-2-6
Australia	September 30, 2009	Shock Records	CD	30848-2
Japan	January 20, 2010	Imperial Records	CD	TECI-24584
