= Hope Sandoval & the Warm Inventions =

American-Irish dream pop band

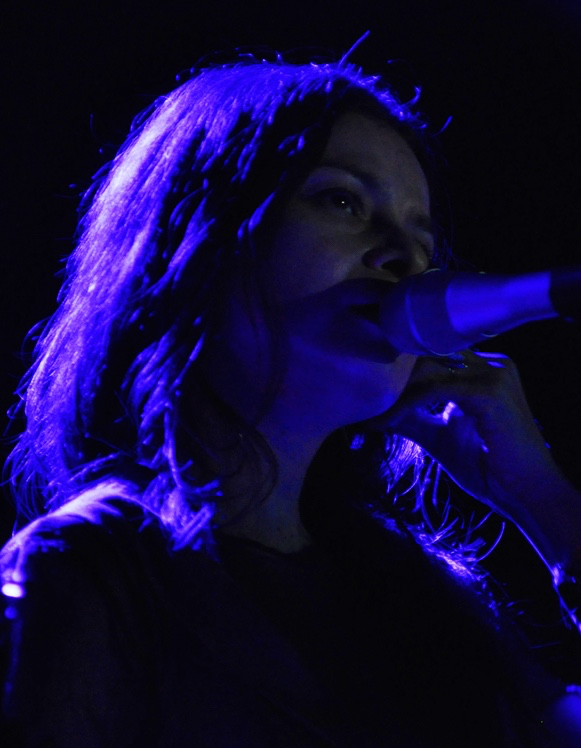
- Performing in New York, 2010

Background information
- Genres: Dream pop; psychedelic folk; slowcore
- Years active: 2000–present
- Labels: Rough Trade; Sanctuary; Nettwerk; Tendril Tales
- Spinoff of: Mazzy Star; My Bloody Valentine
- Members: Hope Sandoval; Colm Ó Cíosóig

Hope Sandoval & The Warm Inventions are an American-Irish dream pop band comprising Hope Sandoval of Mazzy Star and Colm Ó Cíosóig of My Bloody Valentine. Their first studio album, Bavarian Fruit Bread, was released on 23 October 2001. Alan Browne, from Irish band Dirt Blue Gene, played bass and co-wrote several songs on the album. Through the Devil Softly was released on 29 September 2009, and was recorded with Dirt Blue Gene. Their third album, Until the Hunter, was released on 4 November 2016. Its first single, "Isn't It True", was released on 7" vinyl as part of Record Store Day 2016. A second single, "Let Me Get There" featuring Kurt Vile, was released on 23 September.

In a 2016 interview with Consequence of Sound, Ó Cíosóig explained how the musical composition differed from his and Hope's other bands, "It's not that our other bands have restrictions, but there's a certain sound in those bands. Hope and I have a sound, but it's always changing and morphing into different things while still carrying a similar thread."

== Discography ==
=== Studio albums ===
List of studio albums with selected chart positions
| Title | Album details | Peak chart positions | | | | | | |
| Title | Album details | US | US Alt. | US Heat. | BEL (FL) | BEL (WA) | FRA | NOR |
|---|---|---|---|---|---|---|---|---|
| Bavarian Fruit Bread | Released: 23 October 2001; Label: Sanctuary; Formats: CD · vinyl · digital download | — | — | 39 | — | — | — | 40 |
| Through the Devil Softly | Released: 29 September 2009; Label: Nettwerk; Format: CD · digital download | 160 | 41 | 6 | — | — | 69 | — |
| Until the Hunter | Release date: 4 November 2016; Label: Tendril Tales; Format: CD · digital download · vinyl | — (Note: Until the Hunter did not enter the Billboard 200, which now incorporates streaming and album-equivalent units. It did peak at number 90 on Top Current Albums, which does not.) | 14 | 2 | 47 | 66 | 183 | — |
"—" denotes a release that did not chart or was not released in that territory.

=== EPs ===
List of extended plays, with track listing and release information
| Title | Album details | Track listing |
|---|---|---|
| At the Doorway Again | Released: 11 October 2000; Label: Rough Trade; Catalog: RTRADE-S008; Format: CD, vinyl | 1. "Around My Smile" (album version) – 4:38; 2. "Charlotte" (album version) – 4:32; 3. "Sparkly" (previously unreleased) – 2:31; 4. "Down the Steps" (previously unreleased) – 3:43 |
| Suzanne | Released: 10 September 2002; Label: Rough Trade; Catalog: RTRADE-S059; Format: CD | 1. "Suzanne" (radio edit) – 3:31; 2. "I Thought You'd Fall For Me" (previously unreleased) – 4:53; 3. "These Things" (previously unreleased) – 3:00; 4. "Friends Of A Smile" (previously unreleased) – 2:44 |
| Son of a Lady | Released: 15 September 2017; Label: Tendril Tales; Format: 10-inch vinyl, digital download | 1. "Let Me Get There" (previously unreleased acoustic version); 2. "Sleep" (previously unreleased); 3. "Son of a Lady" (previously unreleased); 4. "Antiquity" (previously unreleased) |

=== Singles ===
| Year | Single | Details | Album |
|---|---|---|---|
| 2001 | "Around My Smile" | Released: 13 November 2001; Format: 1-track promo single | Bavarian Fruit Bread |
| 2002 | "On The Low" | Released: 22 April 2002; Format: 1-track promo single | Bavarian Fruit Bread |
| 2002 | "Suzanne" (Radio Edit) | Released: 10 September 2002; Format: CD-single EP | Bavarian Fruit Bread |
| 2008 | "Wild Roses" (Inédit) | Released: 29 June 2008; Format: 1-track acetate promo | Through The Devil Softly |
| 2009 | "Blanchard" (Radio Edit) | Released: 4 August 2009; Format: 1-track promo single; Catalog: 5-037703-23152-8 | Through The Devil Softly |
| 2010 | "Trouble" | Released: April 1, 2010; Format: Music video | Through The Devil Softly |
| 2010 | "Golden Hair" | Released: 10 August 2010; Format: Digital single; B-Side: "Suddenly Beside You" | non-album single |
| 2016 | "Isn't It True" | Released: 16 April 2016; Format: 7" vinyl; B-Side: "She's in the Wall" | Until the Hunter |
| 2016 | "Let Me Get There" (featuring Kurt Vile) | Released: 23 September 2016; Format: 10" vinyl; B-Side: "That Spider" | Until the Hunter |
