= Rick Holland =

English poet and independent artist (born 1978)

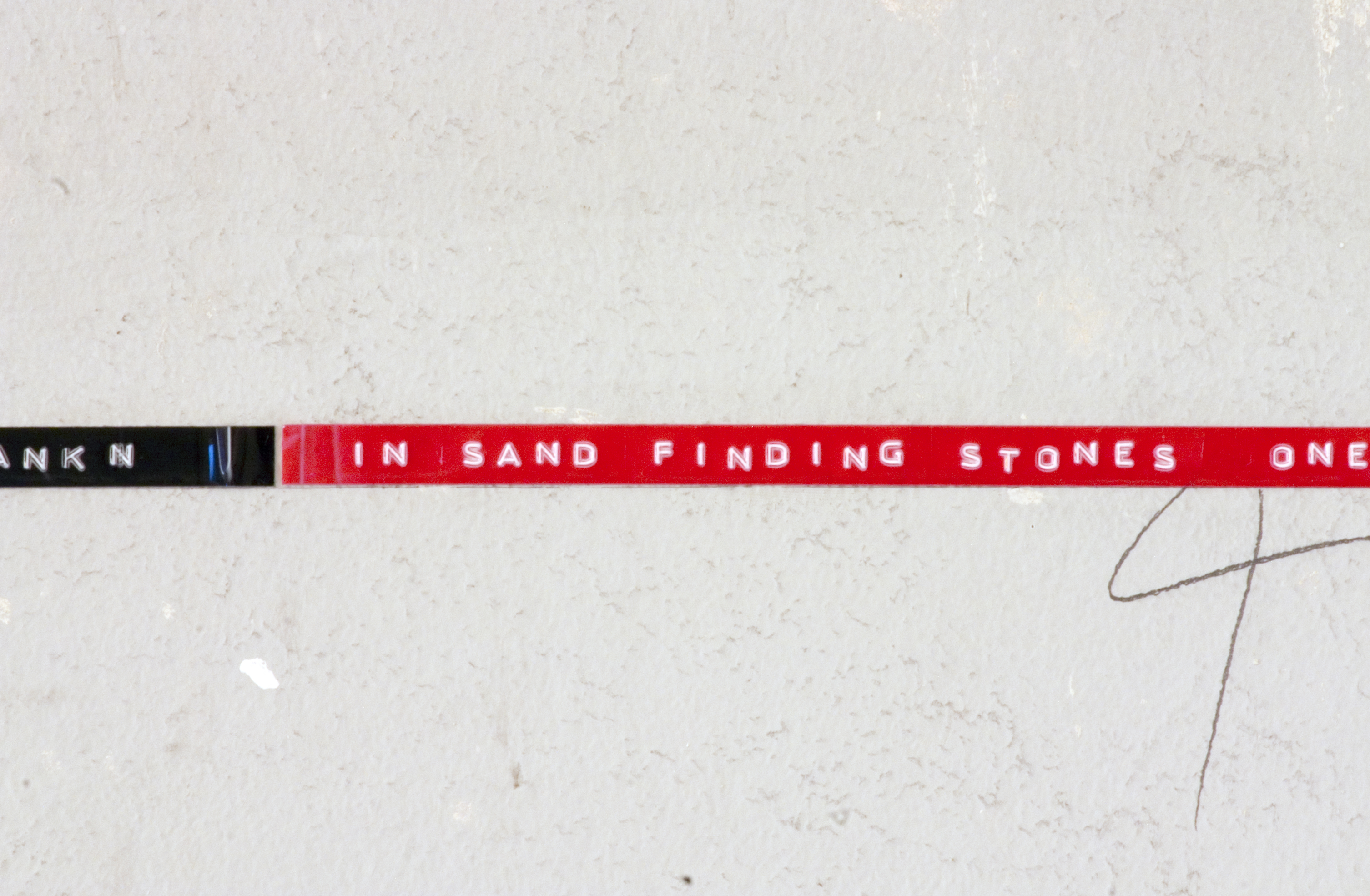
A poem by Rick Holland, embossed onto Dymo tape. From a 2010 installation with Brian Eno.

Rick Holland is an English poet and independent artist. He was born in Aldershot in 1978.

== Published work ==
His first book 'Story the Flowers' was made at Calvert's Co-Operative Press in Bethnal Green in 2010. The work is constructed within the tradition of psychogeography and of the city wanderer or flaneur and has been re-imagined and cited as influence for other artists, most recently East India Youth in the naming of his album, 'Culture of Volume', taken from the poem 'Monument'.

Often collaborating with artists in other fields, his most notable collaborative pieces have been with Brian Eno and released on Warp Records. He co-wrote the 2011 album Drums Between the Bells and the album's sister EP Panic of Looking. Significant writing credits also include the Brian Eno/Karl Hyde album High Life released in June 2014. He has also co-created work for theatre and dance, installations with Brian Eno and visual artist Anya Gallaccio.

The works with Eno led to the coining of the term 'poetronica' in the press, a term suggesting that evolving digital literacy continues to change conventional literary narrative and recent work with Robert Thomas (former Chief Creative Officer for RjDj) seeks to further explore new and non-linear formats for writing and reading poems.

An exclusive piece, "I Remember" is included in Jon Hopkins' 2015 compilation Late Night Tales.

== Cricket ==
In addition to being a poet, Holland is a professional cricket coach who was awarded the Mike Brook Performance Coach of the Year Award in 2017.

He was in the academy at Sussex County Cricket Club to senior level, just falling short of playing for the county itself. He also captained England Schools' South of England Under-15s team. Since 2020 Holland has played for Keighley Cricket Club in the Bradford Premier League.
