= Teleman =

English indie pop band

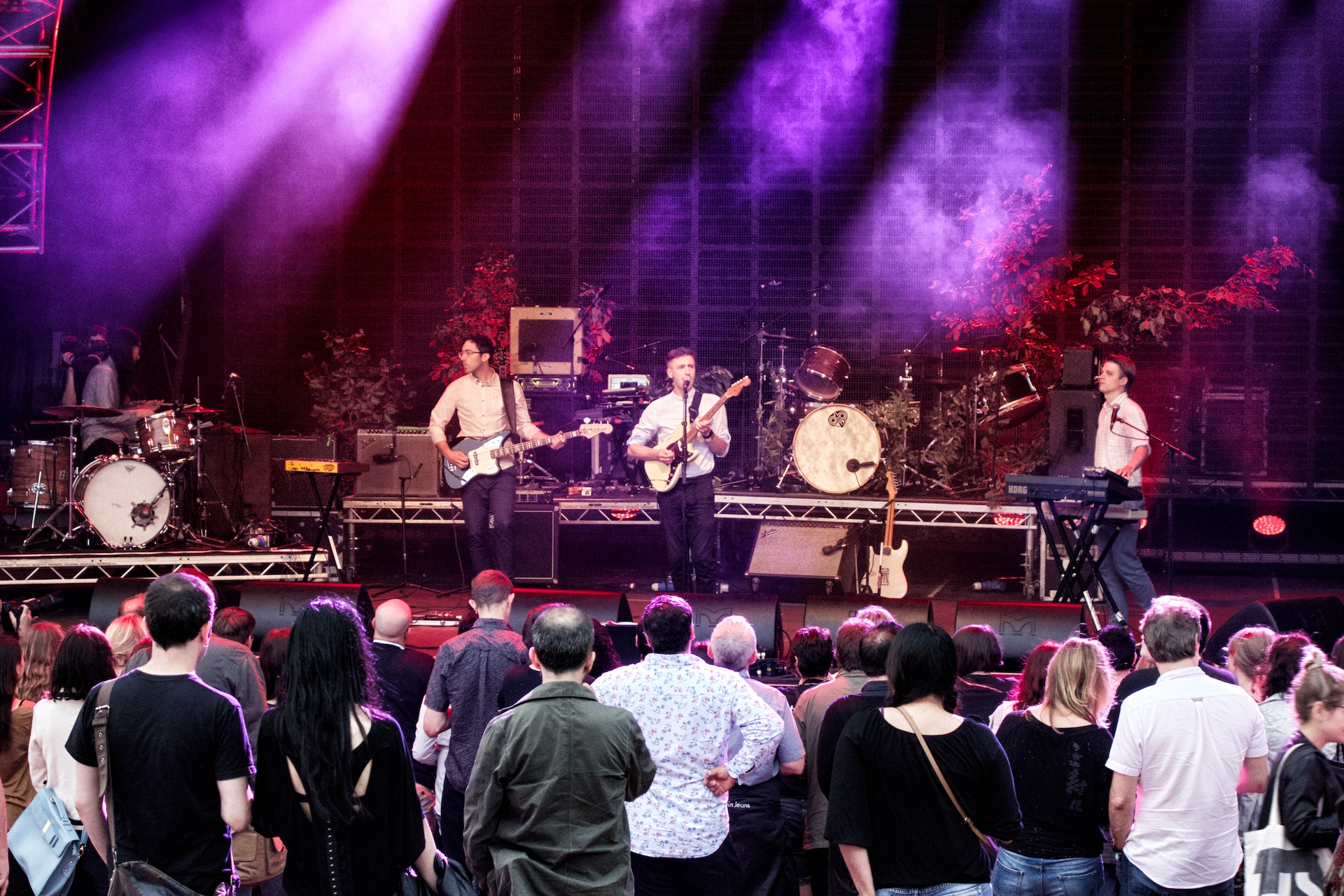

Background information
- Origin: London, England, United Kingdom
- Genres: Alternative rock, Indie pop
- Years active: 2011–present
- Label: Moshi Moshi
- Members: Thomas Sanders; Peter Cattermoul; Hiro Ama
- Past members: Jonny Sanders
- Website: www.telemanmusic.com

Teleman are an English indie pop band formed in London in 2011. The group consists of Thomas Sanders (vocals, guitar), Pete Cattermoul (bass) and Hiro Ama (drums).

== History ==
Pete Cattermoul and brothers Jonny and Thomas Sanders were previously members of indie band Pete and the Pirates. Following the disbanding of that group in 2011, the three started writing and recording new music under the name Teleman, adding drummer Hiro Ama. The band's name was inspired by an album in a charity shop by composer Georg Philipp Telemann.

Teleman's debut single Cristina was released in early 2013, with the debut album Breakfast coming in mid-2014, produced by Bernard Butler. Further singles from the album included "23 Floors Up", "Skeleton Dance" and "Mainline". "Lady Low" from the record featured Stephen Black on saxophone. The band toured supporting Suede, Metronomy, Maxïmo Park, Kaiser Chiefs and Franz Ferdinand, and appeared in festivals including Glastonbury, Green Man, End of the Road and Les Inrocks.

In 2014 and 2015 Teleman toured Europe and the US, while preparing to record their second album. They released the stand-alone single "Strange Combinations" in March 2015.

In 2016, they opened for Belle and Sebastian on tour.

Teleman's second album, Brilliant Sanity, was released in April 2016. Two singles were released from it previously: "Fall in Time" and "Düsseldorf".

The band have been championed by radio presenter Marc Riley, who booked them for a session on his BBC 6 Music show in January 2013. Two further sessions were recorded in 2014. They also appeared on his BBC Online music show "All Shook Up" in 2015 and played four songs live in session on Riley's show on 6 April 2016. The group played two tracks live on Lauren Laverne's BBC 6 Music show 6 Music Live Room on 6 September 2018 promoting the release of their new album.

On 15 September 2020, the band announced that keyboard player Jonny had departed the band.

== Related projects ==
Thomas Sanders has recorded music under his solo name, Tap Tap. As of 2020, he began using the name Tom Sanders when releasing solo music, with "Baby All You've Got" being his first single. Sanders's debut solo LP, "Only Magic", was released on 4 December 2020 through Moshi Moshi Records.

Hiro Ama released his debut EP "Uncertainty" on 4 September 2020 through Prah Recordings.

Former band member Jonny Sanders creates music and lyric videos under the name Prehuman, including some for Teleman.

== Discography ==
=== Albums ===
==== Studio albums ====
List of studio albums, with selected chart positions
Title	Album details	Peak chart positions		
Title	Album details	UK	UK Indie	SCO
Breakfast	Released: 3 June 2014; Label: Moshi Moshi	65	11	97
Brilliant Sanity	Released: 8 April 2016; Label: Moshi Moshi	51	8	49
Family of Aliens	Released: 7 September 2018; Label: Moshi Moshi	40	7	24
Good Time/Hard Time	Released: 7 April 2023; Label: Moshi Moshi	78 (Note: "Good Time/Hard Time" entered #78 of the UK Albums Chart and peaked at number 14 on the UK Album Sales Chart.)	3	30
"—" denotes a recording that did not chart or was not released in that territory.

==== Remix albums ====
Title	Album details
Family of Remixes	Released: 17 May 2019; Label: Moshi Moshi

=== Extended plays ===
List of extended plays, with selected chart positions
Title	EP details	Peak chart positions
Title	EP details	UK Record
Fünf	Released: 17 November 2017; Label: Moshi Moshi	—
Sweet Morning	Released: 5 November 2021; Label: Moshi Moshi	28
"—" denotes a recording that did not chart or was not released in that territory.

=== Singles ===
Title	Year	Peak chart positions		Album
Title	Year	UK Sales	UK Indie	Album
"Christina"	2013	15	39	Breakfast
"Steam Train Girl"	2013	17	— (Note: "Steam Train Girl" did not enter the UK Independent Singles Chart, but peaked at number 20 on the UK Independent Singles Breakers Chart.)	Breakfast
"23 Floors Up"	2014	24	—	Breakfast
"Skeleton Dance"	2014	—	—	Breakfast
"Mainline"	2014	—	—	Breakfast
"Strange Combinations"	2015	—	—	Non-album single
"Fall in Time"	2015	—	—	Brilliant Sanity
"Düsseldorf"	2016	—	—	Brilliant Sanity
"Glory Hallelujah"	2016	—	—	Brilliant Sanity
"English Architecture"	2016	—	—	Brilliant Sanity
"Tangerine"	2016	—	—	Brilliant Sanity
"Submarine Life"	2018	—	—	Family of Aliens
"Cactus"	2018	—	—	Family of Aliens
"Song for a Seagull"	2018	—	—	Family of Aliens
"Family of Aliens"	2019	—	—	Family of Aliens
"Between the Rain"	2019	—	—	Family of Aliens
"Right as Rain"	2021	—	—	Sweet Morning
"Simple Like Us"	2021	—	—	Sweet Morning
"Short Life"	2022	—	—	Good Time/Hard Time
"Easy Now I’ve Got You"	2022	—	—	Good Time/Hard Time
"Good Time/Hard Time"	2023	—	—	Good Time/Hard Time
"Trees Grow High"	2023	—	—	Good Time/Hard Time
"Cherish"	2023	—	—	Good Time/Hard Time
"String Theory"	2023	—	—	Good Time/Hard Time
"—" denotes a recording that did not chart or was not released in that territory.
