= Let Me Get There =

Single by Hope Sandoval & the Warm Inventions

from the album Until the Hunter
- Released: September 23, 2016
- Length: 7:29
- Label: Tendril Tales
- Songwriter(s): Hope Sandoval; Colm Ó Cíosóig
- Producer(s): Sandoval; Ó Cíosóig

Hope Sandoval & the Warm Inventions singles chronology
"Isn't It True" (2016)	"Let Me Get There" (2016)

"Let Me Get There" is a song by American-Irish band Hope Sandoval & the Warm Inventions, released as the second single from their third studio album, Until the Hunter (2016). The song features guest vocals from singer-songwriter Kurt Vile. It was the second release issued through the band's own independent record label, Tendril Tales, following previous single "Isn't It True".

The single was released as a limited edition 10" vinyl on September 23, 2016, with a one-track digital single following a month later. The vinyl contained a B-side, "That Spider", which later appeared on the UK deluxe edition of the album. A music video for the song, directed by Sandoval, was released in early October.

== Track listing ==
7" vinyl — TT02
No.	Title	Writer(s)	Length
1.	"Let Me Get There" (featuring Kurt Vile)	Sandoval · Ó Cíosóig	7:29
2.	"That Spider"	Sandoval · Dave Brennan	4:10

Digital single
No.	Title	Length
1.	"Let Me Get There"	7:29

== Versions ==
- Full length version (7:29) – distributed via INgrooves' SoundCloud account to media outlets.
- Video edit (4:01) – a heavily edited version of the song, containing two verses and choruses along with a small portion of the outro. This version is available on the song's music video.

== Personnel ==
Credits adapted from the vinyl liner notes.

Musicians

- Hope Sandoval – songwriter, instrumentation, lead vocals, producer, mixing
- Colm Ó Cíosóig – songwriter, drums, producer, engineer
- Kurt Vile – lead vocals ("Let Me Get There")
- Dave Brennan – songwriter, guitar
- Alan Browne – bass
- Charles Cullen – guitar
- Alan Montgomery – bass ("That Spider")
- Mick Whelan – keyboards

Technical

- Barry Bödeker – artwork
- Jamieson Durr – mixing
- Frank Gironda – management
- Michael Manning – engineer

== Charts ==
Chart (2016)	Peak position
Belgium (Ultratip Bubbling Under Flanders)	47
UK Physical Singles (OCC)	4
UK Vinyl Singles (OCC)	2

== Release history ==
Region	Date	Label	Distributor(s)	Format(s)	Catalog #	Ref.
Worldwide	September 23, 2016	Tendril Tales	INgrooves	10" vinyl	TT02	
Worldwide	October 23, 2016	Tendril Tales	—	Digital download	—	
