= Bowhammer =

In music, a bowhammer is a device used when playing a cymbalum to strike, pull across or pick the strings in order to make them vibrate and emit sound. It was devised to replace the mallets that were traditionally used to play the cymbalum. Unlike mallets, which almost exclusively are used for striking, the bowhammer allows for greater versatility, "expanding the sonic and expressive scope of an ancient instrument."

It consists of a ring, which holds the bowhammer on the finger, a shaped handle attached to the ring, and a 3 inch section of violin bow at the end. Bowhammers are typically worn in groups of eight, one on each finger except the thumb.

The tension on the bow allows the player to stroke the string or strike it. Additionally the string can be plucked it with the end of the bowhammer.

The bowhammer is a recent musical invention created by the musician Michael Masley, who is the premiere user of this tool. The sound generated is significantly different from that generated by the traditional hammering of the cymbalom, that the artist considers the bowhammer cymbalom a specific instrument. The bowhammer may be usable on other string instruments, such as the guitar or hammered dulcimer, but no other uses have surfaced to date.
