= Pete and the Pirates =

English indie rock band

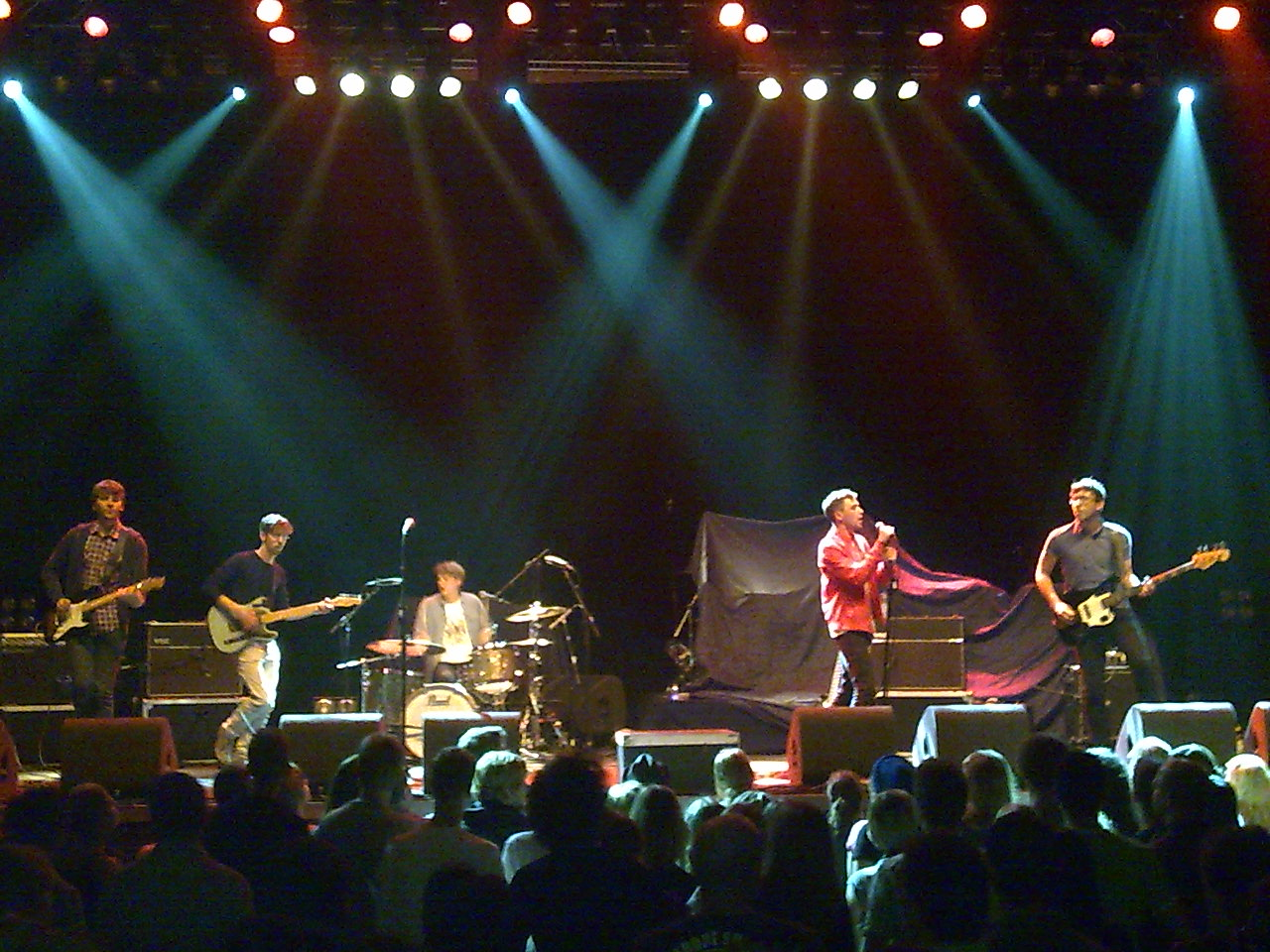
- Performing live at 013, Tilburg in 2009

Background information
- Origin: Reading, Berkshire, England
- Genres: Indie pop; indie rock; post-punk revival
- Years active: 2004–2012
- Labels: Stolen Recordings; Little Teddy
- Members: Thomas Sanders; Pete Hefferan; David Thorpe; Pete Cattermoul; Jonny Sanders
- Website: www.peteandthepirates.co.uk/

Pete and the Pirates were an English indie rock band from Reading, Berkshire, England. The band consisted of Thomas Sanders (vocals), Peter Hefferan (vocals and guitar), David Thorpe (guitar), Peter Cattermoul (bass) and Jonny Sanders (drums).

== History ==
=== Beginnings and Get Even EP (2004–2005) ===
Brothers Tommy Sanders and Jonny Sanders grew up playing music together at home in their early teens. Jonny later played in a band with Guitarist David Thorpe while attending Maiden Erlegh School in Reading. It was not until they all left school that they met with bassist Peter Cattermoul and guitarist Peter Hefferan, who had also played music together in their late teens, that the band was formed. Initially, the lineup did not include Tommy Sanders and was fronted by Peter Hefferan.

After playing just a few shows around Reading, the band were invited on a short tour with all-girl punk band Wetdog, who took them to play at The Spitz in Spitalfield Market. It was here that the band was picked up by a new indie label, Stolen Recordings, and where they would begin to build their reputation as an exciting live act. Just a few months later, the bands was in a studio in Hornsey making their first EP.

The band's first release, the Get Even EP, was limited to 500 numbered CDs, all with handmade covers. Rough Trade wrote of the EP "The six tracks have folk bits, byrdsy harmony bits, kraut-rock frug-outs, punk blasts of power and superb pop moments all segued and strewn together carelessly but precisely. It's oddball and charming and would sit perfectly next to the englishness of the Mystery Jets or Wire, although they sound like neither."

=== Wait, Stop, Begin EP (2006–2007) ===
After the release of their first EP, the band came to the notice of Jason Lamont of CMO Management. The band continued to play more shows around London and the UK and Tommy Sanders joined the group in 2006. Sometime after this the band were approached by Lamont for management and also by William Morris Endeavor for live bookings. Songs from Wait, Stop Begin would appear later on the debut album Little Death.

On 25 August 2007 the band played in the Carling Tent at Reading Festival. They also played guerilla gigs in the campsite later that day, which came to the attention of the NME who featured an article in their magazine.

=== Little Death (2008–2010) ===
In June 2007 they released their debut single "Come On Feet" on Stolen Recordings and were championed by Steve Lamacq on his In New Music We Trust radio show on BBC Radio 1. It also featured in EA Sports game, UEFA Euro 2008.

Their first album Little Death, produced by Gareth Parton and the band, was released on 17 February 2008. It was described by NME as "perfect pop without the pretence". Pitchfork gave Little Death 8 out of 10 saying "Even if you'd be loathe [sic] to admit it to your friends, "Dry Wings", with lines like, "Time for bed / Find a girl and go to bed / Close your eyes / Stars are falling from the sky," is mighty affecting—a winking galaxy of jangled wist, sweet, staggered harmonies and a gawky, yearning sense of wonder." The Guardian gave the album 3 out of 5 stars saying, "this eclecticism does make Little Death feel like the work of several different bands. No matter. There is imagination to spare here, as well as the occasional winning lyric." Conversely, in a review by Vice Magazine, Little Death was given 0 out of 10 and winner of the "worst album of the month" category. In this review, written by Stewy Matterson, the album was described as "jangly guitar music that doesn't actually sound like it wants to be heard by anybody apart from [the band's] mothers".

The band played several support dates with Maxïmo Park, Vampire Weekend, Pigeon Detectives and Gossip and were the headline act at Club NME at London's KOKO in September 2008. Pete and the Pirates also performed BBC 6 Music sessions on shows with Stephen Merchant (co-creator of The Office), George Lamb and more frequently Marc Riley.

"Mr Understanding" was the band's biggest track to date and featured on many TV shows including The Inbetweeners and also in the trailer for the film Hamlet 2 starring Steve Coogan.

=== One Thousand Pictures (2011–2012) ===
The band's second album, One Thousand Pictures, produced by Brendan Lynch, was released in the UK on 23 May 2011 to much critical acclaim - the Sunday Express and Artrocker both gave the Album 5 star reviews and Mark Beaumont from NME gave the Album an 8/10 score, describing the music as "Pop in a tar-pit – black and sticky but wonderfully pure at heart". It was also reviewed in The Guardian, Q and many other magazines and broadsheets. The band had become known for their straight-up accented vocal delivery, as noted by Johnny Dee for The Guardian, "you can practically smell the Thames on every word".

The first single from the album, "Come to the Bar", was released on 14 March 2011. The promo video was directed by Rohan Thomas and Tylie Cox and was shot at The Lexington in Angel, London. The video features an interpretive dance performance from Daniela Neugebauer and colour grading from Reuben Sutherland. The song later appeared during the end credits of the Channel 4 show Sirens.

To promote the record the band toured the UK in April and May 2011 with a sold-out show at Heaven, London on 26 May. The Fly reviewed "Celebrating the release of new album 'One Thousand Pictures', the band have refined their audience, marking out a clear divide between their work and that of countless indistinguishable landfill indie bands". They also played an in-store show at Rough Trade East on 2 June 2011.

The second single "United" was released on 16 May 2011. The band requested footage of cats from fans through their website and mailing list to include in the video for the song. The video also features the band hanging around with various cats.

Marc Riley of BBC 6 Music has been one of the band's most prominent enthusiasts, inviting them to perform on his show on numerous occasions. The band have achieved playlists on BBC 6 Music and XFM as well as spot plays on BBC Radio 1, where Zane Lowe gave "Come To The Bar" his "Hottest Record in the World" for the song's first radio play.

"Blood Gets Thin" was used in an episode of The Protector and of American Horror Story, and in a trailer for the fourth season of Breaking Bad.

A large number of CD and vinyl copies of the album were scorched in a fire at Sony's distribution warehouse during the 2011 England riots.

The band toured the UK and Europe from September to November 2011, with a headline show at the Scala in London on 4 October and a 9,000 capacity show with Kaiser Chiefs at Kirkstall Abbey on 10 September. However, their activity was minimal during 2012, and in late October 2012, Marc Riley, on his BBC 6 Music radio show, confirmed the rumours that the band had split up. No official statement has been released.

Tommy, Jonny and Peter Cattermoul have reformed under the name Teleman.

Peter Hefferan now fronts a band called The 3.1419 Wonders, and recently toured with Dan le Sac, as well as singing on a track on his latest album Space Between the Words.

== Discography ==
=== Studio albums ===
List of studio albums, with selected chart positions
Title	Album details	Peak chart positions	
Title	Album details	UK	UK Indie
Little Death	Released: 18 February 2008; Label: Stolen Recordings; Formats: CD, LP, digital download	71	6
One Thousand Pictures	Released: 23 May 2011; Label: Stolen Recordings; Formats: CD, LP, digital download	75	10

=== EPs ===
- "Get Even" (August 2005)
- "Wait Stop Begin" (July 2006)

=== Singles ===
List of singles, with selected chart positions, showing year released and album
Title	Year	Peak chart positions			Album
Title	Year	UK Sales	UK Indie	SCO	Album
"Come On Feet"	2007	—	26	—	Little Death
"Knots"	2007	85	10	82	Little Death
"Mr. Understanding"	2008	45	5	56	Little Death
"She Doesn't Belong To Me"	2008	59	6	—	Little Death
"Jennifer / Blood Gets Thin"	2008	—	—	—	Non-album single
"Come To The Bar"	2011	—	—	—	One Thousand Pictures
"United"	2011	—	—	—	One Thousand Pictures
"Half Moon Street"	2011	—	—	—	One Thousand Pictures
"—" denotes a recording that did not chart or was not released in that territory.

== Solo projects ==
Some members of the band have worked on solo projects including Tommy Sanders' Tap Tap.
