= At the Doorway Again =

EP by Hope Sandoval & the Warm Inventions
- Released: October 11, 2000
- Recorded: 1999–2000
- Genre: Folk rock
- Length: 15:14
- Label: Rough Trade
- Producer: Hope Sandoval; Colm Ó Cíosóig

Hope Sandoval & the Warm Inventions chronology
At the Doorway Again (2000)	Bavarian Fruit Bread (2001)

At the Doorway Again is the debut EP by Hope Sandoval & the Warm Inventions, released exclusively in the UK and Ireland by Rough Trade Records on October 11, 2000. The EP was issued in other territories as an import-only release, and was re-released digitally by Nettwerk from 2012.

== Composition and style ==
Hope Sandoval and the Warm Inventions is a musical group founded by Mazzy Star vocalist Hope Sandoval and My Bloody Valentine drummer Colm Ó Cíosóig. Hot Press said the collaboration between the two was "not the most obvious musical coupling", describing Sandoval as the "queen of the American smoky folk/rock underground" and Ó Cíosóig as the "drummer and percussionist with the almost mythical Anglo-Irish, tremolo-happy distortionists [My Bloody Valentine]," but went on to call their work on At the Doorway Again a "very successful alliance." They said "Around My Smile" was a "tremendously atmospheric shimmerfest, with an almost otherworldly reverb from the guitars providing the perfect setting for Sandoval to sing those sweet, soft, sultry blues." AllMusic said the song illustrated "[Sandoval] at her most sexy" while comparing it to a 1950s ballad and the work of Julee Cruise.

"Charlotte" features acoustic guitar from Bert Jansch. Sandoval said that she had been a fan of Jansch "for many many years. Mazzy Star actually played a show with Bert I forget where in London. I just asked if he'd be into playing music together. And he said, 'Well, send me a tape and I'll tell you'. And so I sent him a tape of some of the songs and he really liked them. So he flew out to Oslo and we recorded for three days." He also performs on the Bavarian Fruit Bread track "Butterfly Mornings". AllMusic said of the remaining two songs: "Far away from the heavy or morose sounds of their previous bands, on the instrumental 'Sparkly', Sandoval whispers, warbles, and croons through beautiful acoustic guitars, light vibes, and strings, while on 'Down the Steps' she sings breathlessly over a simple piano progression."

== Critical reception ==
Professional ratings
Review scores
Source	Rating
AllMusic	3/5 stars

AllMusic compared the EP to the work of Sandoval's previous band, saying that it was "not a radical departure from the Mazzy Star sound, filled as it is with dark, romantic lullabies; but where Mazzy Star have always had an element of psychedelia to their sound, At the Doorway Again abandons that style for sparse, lighter arrangements." They summarized by calling it a "fine start for both Sandoval and Ó Cíosóig". Washington City Paper echoed this sentiment, saying that although Ó Cíosóig was a "potentially more upbeat writing partner [than David Roback] ... [Sandoval's] Mazzyfied [sic] musical intent remains intact: complete listener sedation." They described the songs on the EP as "increasingly depressing", but summarized by saying: "Of course, there's something to be said for droning, turgid folk rock that induces full-body paralysis: The open-air, acoustic soundscapes here are consistently gorgeous and ultimately soothing, and Ji-Young Moon's weepy cello on 'Down the Steps' is the perfect heartache accompaniment to Sandoval's lilting, lulling voice."

== Track listing ==
No.	Title	Writer(s)	Length
1.	"Around My Smile"	Sandoval; Ó Cíosóig; Alan Browne; Paul McQuillan	4:38
2.	"Charlotte"	Sandoval	4:32
3.	"Sparkly"	Sandoval; Ó Cíosóig	2:31
4.	"Down the Steps"	Sandoval; Ó Cíosóig	3:43

== Credits and personnel ==
Credits adapted from the liner notes of At the Doorway Again.

- Hope Sandoval – vocals and backing vocals, production, all instrumentation except where noted
- Colm Ó Cíosóig – backing vocals, production, engineering, mixing, all instrumentation except where noted
- Alan Browne – bass on "Around My Smile"
- Scott Campbell – engineering
- Elise Collins – artwork (film stills)
- Bert Jansch – guitar on "Charlotte"
- Paul McQuillan – guitar on "Around My Smile"
- Ji-Young Moon – cello on "Down the Steps"
- Mike Prosenko – artwork (sleeve design)
- Heige Sten – engineering and mixing

== Release history ==
Region	Date	Format	Label	Catalog #
Ireland and the United Kingdom	October 11, 2000	LP	Rough Trade Records	RTRADE–SLP008
Ireland and the United Kingdom	November 13, 2000	CD	Rough Trade Records	RTRADE–SCD008
Worldwide	2012	DL	Nettwerk	N00227–6–DIG
