= Isn't It True =

Single by Hope Sandoval & the Warm Inventions

from the album Until the Hunter
- Released: April 16, 2016
- Genre: Alternative rock
- Length: 3:04
- Label: Tendril Tales
- Songwriter(s): Hope Sandoval; Colm Ó Cíosóig
- Producer(s): Sandoval; Ó Cíosóig

Hope Sandoval & the Warm Inventions singles chronology
"Golden Hair" (2010)	"Isn't It True" (2016)	"Let Me Get There" (2016)

"Isn't It True" is the first single from American-Irish band Hope Sandoval & the Warm Inventions' third studio album, Until the Hunter. The song was first released on an opaque-red 7" vinyl for Record Store Day 2016. This vinyl was limited to 2,500 copies worldwide, and was the first release issued by the band through their own independent record label, Tendril Tales. The vinyl contained an exclusive track as its b-side, titled "She's In the Wall". Both songs feature additional musicianship from Jim Putnam of Radar Bros.

A music video for the song was released on April 19, and features vintage photographs and clips that the band described as "lost and found memories." The video is dedicated to Richie Lee of Acetone. On May 13, "Isn't It True" was released as a 1-track digital single. Until the Hunter was released on November 4, 2016.

== Track listing ==
7" vinyl — TT01
No.	Title	Writer(s)	Length
1.	"Isn't It True"	Sandoval; Ó Cíosóig	3:04
2.	"She's In the Wall"	Sandoval; Ó Cíosóig	3:31
Total length:			6:35

Digital single
No.	Title	Length
1.	"Isn't It True"	3:04

== Personnel ==
Credits adapted from the vinyl liner notes.

Musicians

- Hope Sandoval – songwriter, instrumentation, lead vocals, producer, mixing
- Colm Ó Cíosóig – songwriter, instrumentation, backing vocals, producer, mixing
- Jim Putnam – instrumentation

Technical

- Barry Bödeker — artwork
- Frank Gironda — management

== Charts ==
Chart (2016)	Peak position
UK Physical Singles (OCC)	97

== Release history ==
Region	Date	Label	Distributor(s)	Format(s)	Catalog #	Ref.
Worldwide	April 16, 2016	Tendril Tales	INgrooves	7" vinyl	TT01	
Worldwide	May 13, 2016	Tendril Tales	—	Digital download	—	
