= Bavarian Fruit Bread =

Studio album by Hope Sandoval & the Warm Inventions
- Released: October 23, 2001
- Recorded: 2000 in Oakland, London & Oslo
- Genres: Alternative rock, dream pop, folk
- Length: 49:24
- Labels: Sanctuary (U.S.); Rough Trade (U.K.)
- Producers: Hope Sandoval; Colm Ó Cíosóig

Hope Sandoval & the Warm Inventions chronology
| At the Doorway Again (2000) | Bavarian Fruit Bread (2001) | Through the Devil Softly (2009) |

Bavarian Fruit Bread is the debut studio album from Hope Sandoval, the vocalist of Mazzy Star, and Colm Ó Cíosóig, the drummer of My Bloody Valentine, released under the name Hope Sandoval & The Warm Inventions on October 23, 2001 by Sanctuary Records in the United States and on November 5, 2001 by Rough Trade in the United Kingdom.

"Suzanne," the album's first and only official single, became a minor hit, with its accompanying music video, directed by Elise Collins, receiving heavy rotation on MTV2 in both the US and UK. A few songs on the album, including "Suzanne", pre-date the formation of Mazzy Star.

Seminal folk musician Bert Jansch performed guitar on two songs on the album, "Charlotte" and "Butterfly Mornings," the latter being a cover of a song used in the 1970 film The Ballad of Cable Hogue, where it appeared under its original title of "Butterfly Mornings and Wildflower Afternoons." A large portion of "Butterfly Mornings" was used in an advert for Irish TV channel Setanta Sports during Christmas period 2009.

The Japanese and Australian releases contain a thirteenth track, "Sparkly", as a bonus track; it is identical to the track of the same name that appears on the accompanying At the Doorway Again EP, which was released over a year before its parent album.

The album entered and peaked at #39 on Billboard's Top Heatseekers chart.

== Critical reception ==
"Feeling of Gaze"
"The song captures the moment of eye contact when two people realize their lust is mutual." Lori Miller Barrett, neumu.net

"Around My Smile"
Described as a "psychedelic soul romp" by Pitchfork Media's Nathan Rooney.

Professional ratings
Review scores
| Source | Rating |
|---|---|
| AllMusic | 2.5/5 stars |
| Alternative Press | 9/10 stars |
| ArtistDirect | 4/5 stars |
| Drowned In Sound | 6/10 stars |
| E! Online | 10/10 stars |
| Mojo | 4.5/5 stars |
| Neumu.net | 10/10 stars |
| NME | 7/10 stars |
| Pitchfork Media | (5.6/10) |
| Spin | 3.5/5 stars |
| Uncut | 4/5 stars |

Initial critical response to Bavarian Fruit Bread was generally positive. According to Metacritic, which assigns a normalized rating out of 100 to reviews from mainstream critics, the album received an average score of 75 out of 100, based on 15 reviews.

Many of the positive reviews focused heavily on Sandoval's vocals, with Q magazine stating that "the glacial tones and chimes that The Velvet Underground modelled on "Sunday Morning" are invoked with absolute perfection. Yet even beyond this, Sandoval's sedated, spellbound voice remains a remarkable presence." Lori Miller Barrett, in an overwhelmingly positive review of the album for neumu.net, stated "it's magical and mysterious, compelling and complex," before giving the record a 10 out of 10 score. Alternative Press described the album as "consistently intriguing, haunting and above all, very good," before giving the album a 9 out of 10 score.

Nathan Rooney from Pitchfork criticized the album for lacking a solid shift in theme and sound from that of Sandoval's previous work with Mazzy Star, and wrote that Bavarian Fruit Bread ended up sounding like "a narcissistic and self-paroding record." However, the opening three tracks and the "gorgeous" Charlotte were singled out for particular praise.

Allmusic, whose review—along with the review from Pitchfork—was among the most critical, complimented the album's use of "child-like bells, cello and piano, alt-country electric and chamber-bare acoustic guitar and harmonica gasps," but ultimately dismissed the "minimal" backing tracks as "unsatisfying" and summarized the album as "[not particularly] compelling, striking or affecting."

The November 2001 issue of Mojo magazine commented that "[there] is a narcotic quality to these drifting ballads, one that perfectly suits these shell-shocked, terrorised times. As the world gears up for the Apocalypse, I shall take comfort in Bavarian Fruit Bread—a very haunting, beautiful record." The album was released exactly six weeks after the 9-11 terrorist attacks in New York.

== Track listing ==
| No. | Title | Writer(s) | Length |
|---|---|---|---|
| 1. | "Drop" | William Reid | 2:32 |
| 2. | "Suzanne" | Sandoval | 4:51 |
| 3. | "Butterfly Mornings" | Richard Gillis | 3:34 |
| 4. | "On the Low" | Sandoval; Ó Cíosóig; Alan Browne; Paul McQuillan | 5:09 |
| 5. | "Baby Let Me" | Sandoval; Ó Cíosóig | 1:32 |
| 6. | "Feeling of Gaze" | Sandoval; Ó Cíosóig | 3:26 |
| 7. | "Charlotte" | Sandoval | 4:31 |
| 8. | "Clear Day" | Sandoval | 6:08 |
| 9. | "Clear Day (Reprise)" (Unlisted) | Sandoval | 1:18 |
| 10. | "Bavarian Fruit Bread" | Sandoval | 4:07 |
| 11. | "Around My Smile" | Sandoval; Ó Cíosóig; Browne; McQuillan | 4:38 |
| 12. | "Lose Me on the Way" | Sandoval | 7:42 |
| 13. | "Sparkly" (Japanese/Australian bonus track) | Sandoval; Ó Cíosóig | 2:32 |
| Total length: | | | 51:57 |

Taiwanese bonus disc (AG-031)
| No. | Title | Writer(s) | Length |
|---|---|---|---|
| 1. | "Sparkly" | Sandoval; Ó Cíosóig | 2:23 |
| 2. | "Down the Steps" | Sandoval; Ó Cíosóig | 3:44 |
| 3. | "I Thought You'd Fall for Me" | Sandoval; Ó Cíosóig | 4:55 |
| 4. | "These Things" | Sandoval; Ó Cíosóig | 3:02 |
| 5. | "Friends of a Smile" | Sandoval; Ó Cíosóig | 2:45 |
| Total length: | | | 16:56 |

=== 2009 reissue ===
- The 2009 re-release erroneously excluded "Lose Me on the Way."
- When the album was first uploaded to iTunes servers, the song "Clear Day (Reprise)", a short instrumental interlude, was inadvertently omitted, so that the remainder of the song titles are incorrectly named. "Bavarian Fruit Bread" erroneously became "Around My Smile" and "Around My Smile" erroneously became "Lose Me on the Way" and "Lose Me On The Way" is completely omitted and does not appear on the digital/streaming platforms at all. The members of the band or their management have yet to rectify this issue.

== Credits and personnel ==
Credits adapted from the liner notes of Bavarian Fruit Bread.

- Hope Sandoval – vocals and backing vocals, guitars, keyboards, glockenspiel, harmonica and production
- Colm Ó Cíosóig – backing vocals, guitars, bass, keyboards, drums, engineering, production and mixing
- Mads Bjerke – mixing on "Drop"
- Alan Browne – bass on "Drop," "On the Low" and "Around My Smile"
- Scott Campbell – engineering
- Elise Collins – artwork (film stills)
- Jill Emery – bass on "Bavarian Fruit Bread"
- Julian Goldwhite – guitar on "Bavarian Fruit Bread"
- Arve Henriksen – trumpet on "Lose Me on the Way"
- Bert Jansch – guitar on "Butterfly Mornings" and "Charlotte"
- Paul McQuillan – guitar on "On the Low" and "Around My Smile"
- Ji-Young Moon – cello on "Feeling of Gaze" and "Down the Steps"
- Nicole Presley – backing vocals on "Drop"
- Mike Prosenko – guitar on "Drop"; artwork (sleeve design)
- Helge Sten – engineering and mixing
- Audun Strype – mastering

== Charts ==
| Chart (2001) | Peak position |
|---|---|
| Norwegian Albums Chart | 40 |
| U.S. Billboard Top Heatseekers | 39 |

== Release history ==
| Region | Date | Label | Format | Catalog |
|---|---|---|---|---|
| United States | October 23, 2001 | Sanctuary Records | CD | 06076-83201-2 |
| Japan | October 23, 2001 | P-VINE Records | CD | — |
| United Kingdom | November 5, 2001 | Rough Trade Records | CD/LP | RTRADECD/LP-031 |
| Australia | February 5, 2002 | EMI International | CD | — |
| Taiwan | May 7, 2002 | Avant Garden Records | 2-CD Deluxe Edition | AG-031 |
| United Kingdom | September 28, 2009 | Nettwerk | 11-track CD reissue | 5-037703-087026 |
| United States | September 29, 2009 | Nettwerk | 11-track CD reissue | B002L430K0 |
