= William Doyle (musician) =

English musician

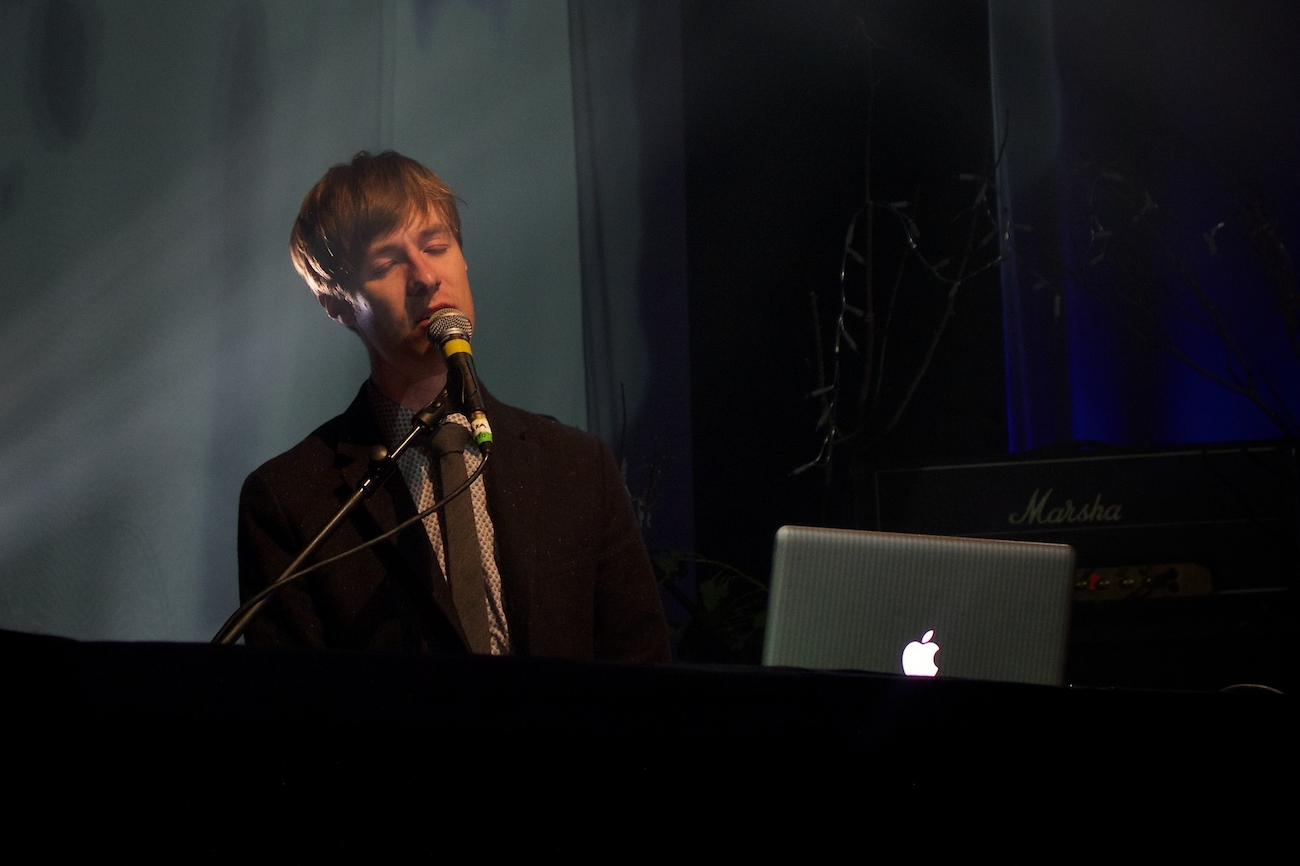

Background information
- Also known as: East India Youth
- Born: William Martin Doyle; 29 January 1991 (age 35); Bournemouth, Dorset, England
- Genres: Electronic; synthpop; ambient; experimental; IDM
- Years active: 2009–2012, 2016–present (as William Doyle), 2012–2016 (as East India Youth)
- Labels: Stolen; XL
- Website: http://william-doyle.co.uk

William Doyle (born 29 January 1991), formerly known by his stage name East India Youth (EIY), is an English musician originally from Bournemouth, England.

Doyle released his first solo album, Born in the USB, in 2009, and was the leader of the indie pop group Doyle and the Fourfathers, whose sole studio album Man Made was released in 2011. His debut album as East India Youth, Total Strife Forever, was released by Stolen Recordings on 13 January 2014. It was nominated for the 2014 Barclaycard Mercury Music Prize Album of the Year award, as well as the Independent Album of the Year award at the 2014 AIM Independent Music Awards.

The name East India Youth derived from the East India Docks area in East London, where Doyle lived during the writing of Total Strife Forever, an album influenced by Tim Hecker, Brian Eno and Harold Budd. And the Youth part: "That's because this place was the start of something new for me; I was creatively reborn". The flat he shared was also colloquially known as the "youth hostel", owing to friends – and friends of friends – staying over on a regular basis. It's for this reason his first EP was titled Hostel.

On 27 January 2015, it was announced that Doyle had signed with XL Recordings and that his second album would be called Culture of Volume. The album was released on 6 April 2015; the name of the album comes from a fragment of verse from the poem "Monument" by Rick Holland.

On 19 February 2016, Doyle announced that he would be taking an indefinite hiatus from his East India Youth moniker. In a lengthy post published on his website, Doyle stated that it was time to take a break from the project and no more shows are planned for the foreseeable future.

Doyle continues to release music – now under his own name, including the 2016 ambient album The Dream Derealised. In early 2017 he supported Sohn on tour in the US and in Europe. Doyle released a second instrumental solo album, Near Future Residence, on 11 December 2018.

On 1 November 2019, Doyle released the album, Your Wilderness Revisited.

His 2021 album Great Spans of Muddy Time is named after a quote by BBC Television presenter Monty Don, who in his memoirs described his bouts of depression as consisting of "nothing but great spans of muddy time".

== Discography ==
=== As East India Youth ===
List of releases as East India Youth, with selected peak chart positions
Title	Album details	Peak chart positions
Title	Album details	UK
Hostel EP	Released: 15 April 2013; Label: The Quietus Phonographic Corporation; Formats: 12", digital download	—
Total Strife Forever	Released: 13 January 2014; Label: Stolen; Formats: CD, LP, digital download	85
Culture of Volume	Released: 6 April 2015; Label: XL; Formats: CD, LP, digital download	50

=== As William Doyle ===
List of albums as William Doyle
Title	Album details
Born in the USB	Released: 2009; Label: Self-released; Formats: Digital download
The Dream Derealised	Released: 24 November 2016; Label: Self-released; Formats: Digital download
Lightnesses	Released: 7 July 2017; Label: Self-released; Formats: Digital download, cassette
Lightnesses II	Released: 17 November 2017; Label: Self-released; Formats: Digital download
Near Future Residence	Released: 11 December 2018; Label: Self-released; Formats: Digital download
Your Wilderness Revisited	Released: 1 November 2019; Label: Self-released via The Orchard; Formats: CD, LP, digital download
Great Spans of Muddy Time	Released: 19 March 2021; Label: Tough Love; Formats: CD, LP, digital download
Springs Eternal	Released: 16 February 2024; Label: Tough Love; Formats: CD, LP, digital download
