= Culture of Volume =

Studio album by East India Youth
- Released: 6 April 2015
- Recorded: William Doyle's home in London
- Genres: Indietronica; synth-pop; experimental; ambient; experimental pop
- Length: 55:12
- Label: XL Recordings
- Producer: William Doyle

East India Youth chronology
Total Strife Forever (2014)	Culture of Volume (2015)

Culture of Volume is the second album by the British electronic musician East India Youth, released 6 April 2015 on XL Recordings.

== Production ==
Culture of Volume is the first East India Youth album released by the Richard Russell-owned label XL Recordings. Most of the production and the recording was completed in William Doyle's home in London. According to Doyle, the album's name comes from a fragment of a verse in Rick Holland's poem 'Monument'. Culture of Volume was mixed by Doyle and Graham Sutton, and the album artwork was made by Dan Tombs.

== Release ==
XL Recordings announced in late January that Culture of Volume was scheduled to be released on 6 April in Europe, and 7 April in the US. Besides digital download, the album is pressed in limited 100 signed vinyl and 50 signed CDs. On 3 February, Doyle shared the song "Carousel" with his fans on Twitter, describing it as a very important song to him personally.

== Reception ==
Professional ratings
Review scores
Source	Rating
AllMusic	4/5 stars
The Guardian	5/5 stars

In a contemporary review, Keith Goldhanger of Louder Than War said the tracks "already feel like East India Youth classics". He drew comparisons to the Pet Shop Boys, Orchestral Manoeuvres in the Dark and Underworld, saying that Culture of Volume "flows from '80s sounding pop into '90s dance back into the similar sounding 21st century tunes we fell in love with" on debut album Total Strife Forever (2014).

== Track listing ==
No.	Title	Length
1.	"The Juddering"	4:38
2.	"End Result"	5:17
3.	"Beaming White"	3:53
4.	"Turn Away"	4:07
5.	"Hearts That Never"	6:47
6.	"Entirety"	4:21
7.	"Carousel"	6:22
8.	"Don't Look Backwards"	4:57
9.	"Manner of Words"	10:18
10.	"Montage Resolution"	4:32

== Charts ==
=== Weekly charts ===
Chart (2015)	Peak position
UK Albums (Official Charts)	50
