= Brilliant Sanity =

2016 studio album by Teleman

Studio album by Teleman
- Released: 8 April 2016
- Genre: Indie pop; alternative rock
- Length: 40:31
- Label: Moshi Moshi Records
- Producer: Dan Carey

Teleman chronology
Breakfast (2014)	Brilliant Sanity (2016)	Fünf - EP (2017)

Singles from Brilliant Sanity
- 1. "Fall In Time" Released: 9 December 2015; 2. "Düsseldorf" Released: 29 February 2016; 3. "Glory Hallelujah" Released: 17 May 2016; 4. "Tangerine" Released: 19 August 2016; 5. "English Architecture" Released: 1 November 2016

Brilliant Sanity is the second studio album by British indie pop band Teleman. It was released on 8 April 2016 by Moshi Moshi Records in the United Kingdom and internationally. The album was written by lead vocalist Tom Sanders and produced by Dan Carey. Brilliant Sanity debuted on the UK Albums Chart at number 51, the band's second UK charting album.

== Recording ==
The album's main driving force was claimed by the band to be "the art of songwriting, [and] the process of crafting an immaculate pop song". Additionally, the album was recorded "in a very live and spontaneous way", with particular tracks from the album, such as single Glory Hallelujah, being performed live before the recording of the album began in September 2015.

== Critical reception ==
Professional ratings
Aggregate scores
Source	Rating
Metacritic	80/100
Review scores
Source	Rating
AllMusic	4.5/5 stars
Under the Radar	8/10 stars
The Guardian	4/5 stars
DIY	4/5 stars
The Line of Best Fit	7.5/10
The 405	7/10
No Ripcord	6/10
MusicOMH	3/5 stars

Brilliant Sanity was met with critical acclaim upon its release. At Metacritic, which assigns a normalised rating out of 100 to reviews from professional publications, the album received an average score of 80, based on 11 reviews, indicating "generally favorable reviews".

Heather Phares from AllMusic wrote that "Teleman's sharpened songwriting allows the haunting moods beneath the cheery melodies to cut more deeply, with odd yet potent motifs (glue, shoes, flickering lights) guiding their meditations on permanence and impermanence". Billy Hamilton of Under the Radar praised the album, stating, "By simply placing a fuller smile over their songwriting, Teleman have created a sharp, smart pop record that—if there's any justice in this world—should bring them the wider attention they merit". The Guardian's Michael Hann quoted that the album was "proof of the desirability of letting musicians develop", noting the progression made from three band members' previous group Pete and the Pirates. Jessica Goodman from DIY was satisfied with the album, saying, "The follow-up to 2014 debut 'Breakfast', 'Brilliant Sanity' is an embellished venture through the unmistakable sound the four-piece have forged for themselves". Sofie Jenkinson of The Line of Best Fit wrote that "As a whole Brilliant Sanity is as fresh as it is reminiscent, as catchy as it is challenging and thoughtful – a welcome nod to what has been, with a firm eye on the horizon". Reviewing the album for The 405, Lyle Bignon praised the overall production on the record, stating that "Teleman's clean synth, bass and drum arrangements are ramped up this time around - perhaps the touch of producer Dan Carey (Bat For Lashes, Nick Mulvey, Django Django) - but all in all, they still sit politely with the sanguine vocals and guitar of Johnny Sanders".

In a mixed review, Juan Rodríguez of No Ripcord said, "Brilliant Sanity does adequately describe their modish, classy new wave approach, though— there's a zany kookiness to their Todd Rundgren-inspired cosmic pop that sells the London band short, as they wouldn't even dare to veer off from their studiously structured compositions". Writing for MusicOMH, Graeme Marsh noted that "Unfortunately though, the best has already come and gone. That’s not to say the rest of the album is poor, or even just average, but it largely lacks the joyous warmth of the opening two numbers".

== Commercial performance ==
Brilliant Sanity debuted at number 51 in the UK, the band's highest position on the chart at the time of release. On the Independent Album Breakers Chart, a chart specifically dedicated to independent artists who had not made the top 40, the album debuted at the number 1 position and stayed there for one week.

== Track listing ==
All tracks written by Thomas Sanders and produced by Dan Carey.

Brilliant Sanity track listing
No.	Title	Length
1.	"Düsseldorf"	3:47
2.	"Fall In Time"	3:56
3.	"Glory Hallelujah"	3:29
4.	"Brilliant Sanity"	3:15
5.	"Superglue"	3:21
6.	"Canvas Shoe"	3:36
7.	"Tangerine"	3:03
8.	"English Architecture"	3:57
9.	"Melrose"	3:28
10.	"Drop Out"	5:13
11.	"Devil In My Shoe"	3:26
Total length:		40:31

== Charts ==
Chart performance for Brilliant Sanity
Chart (2016)	Peak position
Scottish Albums (OCC)	49
UK Albums (OCC)	51
