= Hope Springs =

Hope Springs may refer to:

- Hope Springs (TV series), a BBC One comedy-drama series set in Scotland
- Hope Springs (2003 film), romantic-comedy starring Colin Firth, Minnie Driver, and Heather Graham
- Hope Springs (2012 film), romantic comedy-drama starring Meryl Streep, Tommy Lee Jones, and Steve Carell
- Miss Hope Springs, cabaret stage name of British composer, lyricist, pianist and singer Ty Jeffries

== See also ==
- Hope Springs Eternal (disambiguation)
