= Michael Masley =

- Born: 1952 (age 73–74); Trenton, Michigan, United States
- Origin: Berkeley, California, United States
- Genres: Folk; new-age; world
- Occupation: Instrumentalist
- Instrument: Cymbalom

Michael Masley (born September 22, 1952 in Trenton, Michigan, United States) is known for his musical work on the Hungarian cymbalom. His unique method of playing the instrument comes from his invention of the bowhammer, a cross between a fiddle bow and a dulcimer hammer, attached to the finger with a ring. Since 1983, Masley has made his living as a street musician, busking and selling cassette and CD recordings on the streets of Berkeley, San Francisco, and other San Francisco Bay Area locations.

Masley describes his music as "earth-folk", "a contemporary Afro-Celtic variation of Free World and Country Eastern music.". Others have categorized his music as new-age or world music. One musician has described Masley's bowhammer style of cymbalom playing as generating "a turkish steambath of overtones".

== Career ==
Masley studied creative writing at Northwestern Michigan College in the early 1970s. Starting in 1973 he studied hammered dulcimer with Robert Spinner. He played traditional two-hammer dulcimer until 1979, when he developed a ten-hammer technique, presumably by attaching one hammer to each finger. In the winter of 1981, Masley was a caretaker for an isolated fishing lodge in northern Michigan, and spent some of his time there with musical experimentation. At that point, he experimented with attaching horsehair to his fingers in order to bow at dulcimer strings. In 1981, he sometimes worked as a street musician in Ann Arbor, Michigan. In 1982, he ordered a cymbalom from William Webster in Detroit, Michigan and moved to Palo Alto, California. In 1983, he developed the bowhammer, and began working with guitarist Barry Cleveland as the duo "Thin Ice", releasing albums in 1984 and 1985.

In 1995, Masley formed part of a new quintet, named "Cloud Chamber". Other members included Barry Cleveland, bassist Michael Manring, cellist Dan Reiter and percussionist Joe Venegoni. The members of Cloud Chamber met through "The Lodge", an incorporeal musical concept channeled primarily through Barry Cleveland which manifests through musical events attended by three or more members of "the Tribe," a permeable-boundary group of improvising Bay Area musicians. Cloud Chamber released a CD, Dark Matter, in 1998.

Since at least 1993, during certain shows and conventions, especially computer and technology shows, Masley sets up as a street musician in front of San Francisco's Moscone Center and the adjacent Metreon. In 2004, security guards at Sony's Metreon were preparing to displace Masley from playing in front of the facility during the Apple MacWorld event, but listeners in the vicinity convinced them to allow him to remain. In 2005, Masley contacted the Metreon prior to MacWorld to ensure he would be able to perform there unimpeded. During the 2005 show, a Metreon executive inquired if he could be hired for private performances.

Masley has taken on the self-appointed title and persona of Artist General (along the lines of a Surgeon General) and claims to represent the interests of artists, issuing pronouncements such as "Conformity is addictive: don't abuse it".

=== Berkeley ===
In 1985, Masley moved to Berkeley, California and began to record his solo albums.

In 1993, Masley was arrested in Berkeley for selling audio cassette recordings without a business license. According to the East Bay Express of February 17, 1995, at the time of his arrest Masley told authorities "Go to Fremont or Hayward, this is Berkeley...this place is spiritual, and a business license is not a spiritual option." Masley spent one night in jail, and thereafter apparently continued vending without further citations or arrests.

In 2002, Masley served as grand marshal of the How Berkeley Can You Be? parade. As of 2007, Masley can frequently be seen playing all over Berkeley, particularly on Telegraph Avenue.

=== Geronimo: An American Legend ===
In 1993, Ry Cooder arranged to have Masley record music for the soundtrack of the film Geronimo: An American Legend. When the soundtrack album was issued, Masley's name did not appear in the credits. His soundtrack contributions were later used in the broadcast of the 1994 Winter Olympics, on an HBO program, and on Entertainment Tonight, with Masley receiving neither royalties nor credit.

Masley took legal action, resulting in an out-of-court settlement and a letter of vindication signed by Robert E. Holmes of Sony Pictures' music division. Masley described the case in an article titled "Credit is Not Negotiable" which appeared in Musician; in the article, Masley states "To gain access to an audience, artists make compromises that few executives would ask of anyone in the usual labor-for-wages domain. The upshot is that fair compensation must be measured in credit as well as dollars. Recognition is not a mere vanity issue. It is part and parcel of payment." Perhaps ironically, significant portions of the settlement were later spent buying Sony audio equipment.

== Instrument design ==
His unique method of playing the instrument comes from his invention of the bowhammer, a cross between a fiddle bow and a dulcimer hammer, attached to the finger with a ring. The bowhammers, one worn on each finger except thumbs, allow Masley to bow, strike, and pick the cymbalom's strings. These bowhammers, along with a pick on each thumb, allow for the creation of unique musical effects and highly complicated music. Cymbaloms are most commonly played with two dulcimer hammers, one held in each hand. While playing with eight bowhammers and two thumb picks, Masley has been known also to use pan pipes attached to a neck bracket, as well as rhythm instruments such as shakers and rattles attached to his legs.

In addition to the bowhammer, Masley has invented several musical instruments or modifications to existing instruments. These tend to be constructed from mass-produced consumer materials, such as rubber bands and suction cups, often coupled to traditional instruments such as drums.

Instruments include:

- Water Tuned Glass Panpipes. A set of glass panpipes can be arbitrarily tuned as desired (including modal changes and microtonal increments) by adding water to (or removing from) each pipe. Water is typically added and removed with a turkey baster.
- The Kabali, a modified doumbek. A metal doumbek is modified by attaching a piece of PVC pipe to the head via a suction cup. The pipe is used as a bridge supporting sixteen bungee cord strings. The strings may be tuned by use of a spring which circles the instrument below the head. The strings may be played by plucking them (causing them to snap back and hit the drumhead) or by strumming (in which case they resonate), "creating the complex periodicity of an irregular ostinato". The sound has been compared to "multiple cellos strummed with earmuffs".
- The Conundrum. This is a modified doumbek which has several suction cups attached to the head. A long rubber band is wound around the suction cups. Tension on the band and placement of the suction cups controls pitch.
- The Palmharp. An egg slicer is attached to a small shaker drum. The slicer is strung with rubber bands of various tensions parallel to its wires; both wires and rubber bands are the strings of this instrument. Pitch control is achieved by flexing the slicer frame while strumming or plucking the strings, forming an idiophone. The instrument may be simultaneously shaken. This instrument is primarily "textural"; that is, it is intended to add ambient sounds and rhythms rather than melody or harmony.

Perhaps most innovative at a conceptual level is The Sonic Mess Kit. This is made from a cinema film reel cover. The edge (lip) is scored to allow two sets (courses) of rubber bands to be strung across. The two courses are at different depths in the lid and are mostly perpendicular (a right angle) to each other. Parallel to the lower course is a spring, divided into three segments. The tension of each rubber band and spring segment can be individually adjusted.

The lid can be flexed, which will bend the pitch. While many stringed instruments can pitch bend, others bend along only one direction, altering the pitch of only a single set of strings, and by changing the tension of all strings together, their musical interval relationships stay constant. By having two courses of strings which are not parallel, the pitch bending changes the tonal relationships between the two sets of strings. If the instrument is flexed parallel to one set of strings, that set of strings remains unaltered, but the perpendicular set of strings deepens in pitch. If the instrument is flexed at an angle to both sets of strings, the pitch of both sets varies in a mathematically related fashion. Past a certain degree of flex, the two courses of strings touch and dampen each other, and the sounds produced by the spring dominate.

L. Maxwell Taylor wrote about the Sonic Mess Kit in the September 1993 issue of Experimental Musical Instruments:

Masley's tunings also have a random character to them, as though no particular pitch matters to him, only that there be a multiplicity of the pitch. Yet there is a great precision to the relationship of the Sonic Mess Kit's random courses. They are somehow the aural equivalent of funhouse mirrors or comic page impressions on Silly Putty, preserving the contours of the images they reflect while radically altering the appearance of those images from moment-to-moment. The result: a pitch universe in which no stable center governs yet which, for all its randomness, demonstrates an elastic stability.

== Notable appearances ==
NPRs All Things Considered broadcast a segment on (August 15, 1995) and featured Masley on All Songs Considered, an online music program (July 2001). A feature-length movie about Masley, entitled Art Officially Favored featuring Steven Tyler, Joe Elliott, Michael Boddicker and Grand Mixer DXT, and produced and directed by Martin Yernazian, is planned for release in 2018-2019.

== Discography ==
- Thin Ice Live (1984), as part of Thin Ice
- First Frost (1985), as part of Thin Ice
- Cymbalom Solos (1985 on cassette, released on CD 2003)
- The Moment's River (1987)
- Bells and Shadows (1989)
- Mystery Loves Company (1991)
- Sky Blues (1992)
- Cosmosis With cellist Dan Reiter (1992)
- Life in the Vast Lane (1993)
- Mystery Repeats Itself (Compilation of works 1985–1993)
- Dark Matter (1998), as part of Cloud Chamber
- All Strings Considered Dulcimer duets with Jamie Janover (2001)
- Cymbalennium (2004)

=== Other album appearances ===
- Contributed to the soundtrack for Geronimo: An American Legend
- Worked with Butch Vig to contribute to Garbage's Version 2.0
- Barry Cleveland's albums Mythos (1986), Voluntary Dreaming (1990), and Volcano (2003)
- Lou Maxwell Taylor's CD Cheshire Tree Suite (QuiXote Music, 2001)
- Levi Chen's CD Celtic Zen
- Zen Gunslinger

== Bibliography ==
- Baker's Biographical Dictionary of Musicians, 8th edition
- Baker's Biographical Dictionary of 20th Century Classical Musicians
- Jesse Hamlin, "Street musician has a sound that's out of this world,", San Francisco Chronicle, January 15, 2005
- Interview with Cloud Chamber
- Fearless Books profile of Masley
