= Springs Eternal =

Studio album by William Doyle
- Released: 16 February 2024
- Genre: Pop
- Length: 47:14
- Label: Tough Love
- Producer: William Doyle; Mike Lindsay

William Doyle chronology
Great Spans of Muddy Time (2021)	Springs Eternal (2024)

Springs Eternal is a studio album by English musician William Doyle, released on 16 February 2024 through Tough Love. It was produced by Doyle and Mike Lindsay, and received acclaim from critics.

== Themes ==
A recurring element of the lyrics is climate change, with Doyle also noticing towards the end of the recording process that he had written about water in almost all of the songs. Despite this, the album was considered to be generally optimistic in tone.

== Critical reception ==
Professional ratings
Aggregate scores
Source	Rating
Metacritic	81/100
Review scores
Source	Rating
Mojo	4/5 stars
MusicOMH	4/5 stars
The Skinny	3/5 stars
Uncut	8/10

Springs Eternal received a score of 81 out of 100 on review aggregator Metacritic based on four critics' reviews, indicating "universal acclaim". Uncut stated that "Doyle has made a record that is as intricate as it is infectious, creating a deft yet complex pop collage that turns a troubled and chaotic world into a beautiful spectacle". Mojo commented that "for all its filigree detail, Spring Eternal is a big philosophically questing record, a velvet glove hiding a death-like grip".

MusicOMH's John Murphy noted the general optimistic tone of Springs Eternal despite the theme of climate change present, as well as the "layered vocals and pop-infused melodies reflecting a polished, shiny approach running through the album". Joe Creely of The Skinny found it to be "a mixed bag, but not in your usual sense; it's not one song to another where the quality whiplash happens, but rather moment to moment, verse to verse".

== Track listing ==
Springs Eternal track listing
No.	Title	Length
1.	"Garden of the Morning"	4:48
2.	"Now in Motion"	4:56
3.	"Relentless Melt"	4:29
4.	"Soft to the Touch"	6:08
5.	"Eternal Spring"	4:11
6.	"Cannot Unsee"	3:09
7.	"Castawayed"	4:49
8.	"Surrender Yourself"	3:33
9.	"A Short Illness"	4:26
10.	"A Long Life"	3:52
11.	"Because of a Dream"	2:53
Total length:		47:14

== Charts ==
Chart performance for Springs Eternal
Chart (2024)	Peak position
UK Album Downloads (OCC)	48
UK Independent Albums (OCC)	33
