= Le Volume Courbe =

French band

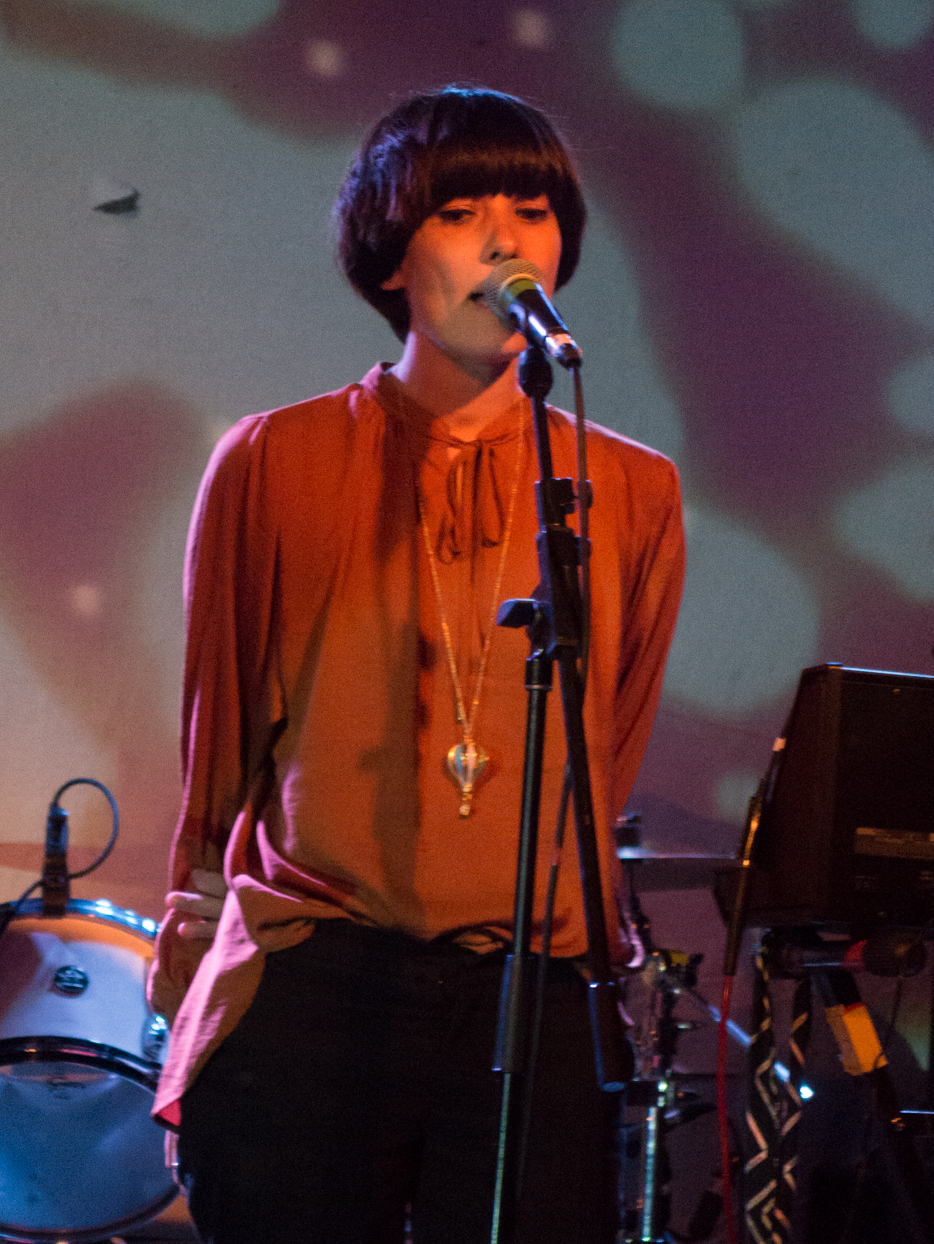
- Marionneau in 2014

Background information
- Origin: London, England
- Genres: Experimental pop
- Instruments: Vocals, guitar, percussion, synthesiser
- Labels: Poptones, Honest Jons, Astralwerks, Ring The Alarm, Pickpocket Records
- Formerly of: Noel Gallagher’s High Flying Birds
- Members: Charlotte Courbe
- Website: www.levolumecourbe.com

Le Volume Courbe (French for "The volume curve") is a band by French-born, London-based singer/songwriter/producer, Charlotte Marionneau/Charlotte Courbe. "Le Volume Courbe" was a name of a sculpture by a friend of Marionneau's, Marcel Marionneau, a French sculptor living in the region of Vendée (France).

== History ==
In 2001, Le Volume Courbe released the "Harmony/Papillon De Nuit" 7" on Alan McGee’s Poptones record label. In 2005, Marionneau recorded her debut album I Killed My Best Friend. The album was first released on Honest Jon's and was then picked up by Astralwerks in the U.S in 2006.

In 2007, Le Volume Courbe released "Freight Train/The House" 7", a collaboration with the band Primal Scream on the label Trouble Records. "Freight Train" was used on the soundtrack of the Channel 4 TV drama Skins.

In 2008, Le Volume Courbe played a series of festivals and tour dates in Europe and the US, most notably, with the newly reformed My Bloody Valentine. The touring lineup included Marionneau on vocals, Theodore Hall on guitar, Mel Draisey on violin, glockenspiel and percussion, and Wild Cat on drums.

In 2011, Le Volume Courbe released a 10" EP titled "Theodaurus Rex". This was the first release on Pickpocket Records, the label founded by Kevin Shields and Charlotte Marionneau.

In 2013, Le Volume Courbe toured with My Bloody Valentine in the UK.

In 2015, Le Volume Courbe released the single "The House"/"Monte Dans Mon Ambulance", followed by the album I Wish Dee Dee Ramone Was Here With Me, being released by Ring The Alarm in the US and by Marionneau and Kevin Shields' label Pickpocket Records in other territories. She also performed throughout UK and Europe as Le Volume Courbe vs Grimm Grimm. The project was formed to perform each other's songs.

In 2017, Marionneau contributed vocals to the Noel Gallagher's High Flying Birds track “It's A Beautiful World”. She also performed in the Noel Gallagher videos "Holy Mountain" and "Beautiful World". In 2018 and 2019 she joined Noel Gallagher’ world tour and performed on the scissors during "She Taught Me How To Fly," and featured in “Black Star Dancing” and “This Is the Place” videos.

In 2019 her track “Born to lie” featured in Killing Eve (Serie 2 Episode 6) and also featured on the Killing Eve compilation.

In 2020 Spotify voted her track “Rusty” (co-written with Chris Mackin) from her second album one of the best tracks of the last decade and selected it for their 00 compilation.

In 2025 she came back with a new album, "Planet Ping Pong", released by Duophonic Super 45s. In this album she renewed her collaboration with Noel Gallagher, who plays guitars and piano in two tracks and is the author of "Alone on the rope".

== Discography ==
=== Albums ===
Cover from "I Killed My Best Friend"

- I Killed My Best Friend - Honest Jon's (2005)
- I Wish Dee Dee Ramone Was Here With Me - Pickpocket Records, Ring The Alarm (2015)
- “Fourteen Years” EP - Honest Jon’s Records (2020)
- "Planet Ping Pong" - Duophonic Super45s (2025)

Guest Vocals (Charlotte Marionneau)

In My Place (1997) Simon Raymonde - Blame Someone Else - Bella Union

Dutch Housing (2002 ) Piano Magic - Writers Without Homes - 4AD

Dutch Housing (Sybarite Remix) (2002) Piano Magic - Writers Remixed (12", EP) - 4AD

Mono Random (2003) 7-Hurtz* - Electroleum - Output Recordings

All The Things You Are (2010) Television Personalities - A Memory Is Better Than Nothing - Rocket Girl

Commiserations (2016) Society (Virgin)

Who Built The Moon (2017) Noel Gallagher's High Flying Birds - It's A Beautiful World - Universal Music

Cliffhanger (2018) Grimm Grimm - Si - Some Other Planet

Production and Vocals

Why You Have To Be Me (2003) 7" - Whitey - PPQ

Films

Kicks - Lindy Heymann (2009): featured I Killed My Best Friend

The Kid - Nick Moran ( 2010): featured I love the Living You

Television

Skins, Season 4 /Episode 6 ( 2010): featured Freight Train

Killing Eve (TV series), Serie 2/Episode 6 (2019) : featured Born to Lie.

Compilations

Harmony (2001) Various - Poptones Presents Radio 4 - Epic/Sony

Ain't Got...I Got Life (2006) Various - From Colette With Love - Colette

Ain't Got No... I Got Life (2007) Various - Reprises Inrocks - Les Inrockuptibles

Little Death (2008) Various - Sound Postcards - The Bookmakers Ed.

Wooly Jumpers: (2011) Various Artists - Wool Recordings

Colette Nuggets Volume 2 (2011) Various - Colette - Colette

Born to lie - 2019 Killing Eve - Heavenly Records
