= Bo Ningen =

Japanese noise rock/alternative rock band

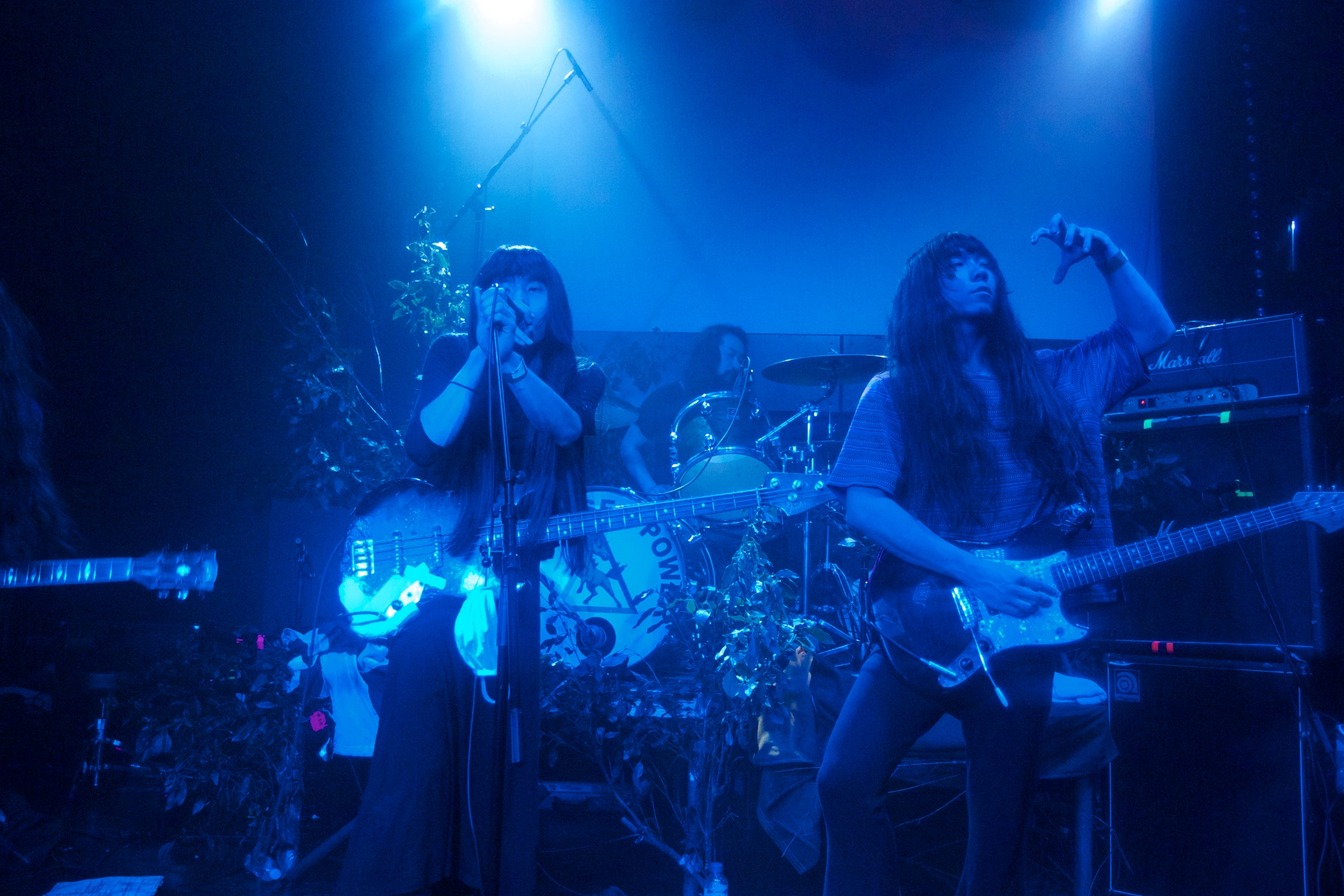
- Bo Ningen performing in 2012

Background information
- Origin: London, England
- Genres: Noise rock, neo-psychedelia
- Years active: 2006–present
- Labels: Stolen Recordings (UK); Sony Music Associated Records (JP); A Remarkable Idea; Alcopop! Records; P-VINE (JP)
- Members: Taigen Kawabe; Kohhei Matsuda; Yuki Tsujii; Monchan Monna
- Website: boningen.info

BO NINGEN are a Japanese four-piece noise rock and alternative rock band, consisting of Taigen Kawabe (bass, vocals), Kohhei Matsuda (guitar, electronics), Yuki Tsujii (guitar), and Monchan Monna (drums). Though they come from Gumma, Tajimi, Nishinomiya, and Tokyo, they met in London. They have released music via Stolen Recordings (also licensed to Sony Music Associated Records in Japan, and Black Night Crash Records in Australia) and Alcopop! Records.

They have performed collaboratively with Damo Suzuki, Faust and Savages.

== Biography ==
The name Bo Ningen means "Stick Man" in Japanese.

Taigen (vocals and bass) and Kohhei (guitar) met at a gig in 2006 and formed the first Bo Ningen duo; they were later joined by Yuki and then by Monchan. The band booked into a studio on Hackney Road and in summer 2007, after continual 12 hour jams they played the first "true" Bo Ningen show at the Wilmington Arms. They then set up their own night 'Far East Electric Psychedelic' at Cross Kings in Kings Cross.

They have since played shows and festivals throughout the UK, Europe and Japan, notably the 2011 Venice Biennale (in collaboration with artists Tim Noble and Sue Webster), which was re-created for Yoko Ono's Meltdown Festival at Royal Festival Hall. They were also invited to perform at the Victoria and Albert Museum's Yohji Yamamoto Friday Late event.

According to an October 2015 interview with Marc Riley on BBC 6 Music, they confessed that they did not even really understand the label of acid rock applied to their style of music.

The tour planned by the band to coincide the release of their 2020 album, Sudden Fictions, was later postponed to April 2021.

== Discography ==
=== Singles ===
- "Henkan" / "Jinsei Ichido Kiri" (2011 Stolen Recordings)
- "Nichijyou" / "Henkan" clear vinyl (2014 Black Night Crash Records)

=== EPs ===
- Koroshitai Kimochi (2009 Stolen Recordings)
- Live at St. Leonard's Church (2012 Stolen Recordings) (limited-edition silk-screened 10", 200 copies)

=== Albums ===
- Bo Ningen (2010 Stolen Recordings, Licensed to Knew Noise Recordings, Japan, Licensed to Black Night Crash Records in Australia)
- Line the Wall (2012 Stolen Recordings, Licensed to Sony Music Associated Records in Japan, Licensed to Black Night Crash Records in Australia)
- III (2014 Stolen Recordings)
- Sudden Fictions (2020 Alcopop! Records)

=== Collaborations ===
- Words to the Blind (2014 Stolen Recordings/Pop Noire) – with Savages
