= Stolen Recordings =

British independent record label

- Parent company: Beggars Group
- Founded: 2005
- Founder: Paul Jones; Merida Sussex; Rachael Robb
- Distributor(s): Beggars Group via ADA (US) PIAS (Europe)
- Genre: Alternative rock; indie rock; rock
- Country of origin: United Kingdom
- Location: London, England
- Official website: http://www.stolenrecordings.co.uk

Stolen Recordings is a British independent record label founded by two musicians, Paul Jones and Mérida Sussex and one artist, Rachael Robb, and is based in Tottenham, London. Stolen's first release was in May 2005. In 2009 they founded a publishing company, in association with Beggars Music, called "Stolen Publishing". Stolen's releases include albums by Thomas Cohen, Bo Ningen, East India Youth, Pete and The Pirates, and Serafina Steer.

Stolen Recordings won the Award for "Best Small Label" at the inaugural AIM Awards on 10 November 2011.

== Artists ==
- Thomas Cohen
- Bo Ningen
- East India Youth
- Pete And The Pirates
- JEFF The Brotherhood
- Serafina Steer
- Let's Wrestle
- Screaming Tea Party
- Race Horses
- Hot Silk Pockets
- Mathew Sawyer and the Ghosts

== Catalogue ==
- Thomas Cohen ‘Bloom Forever’ (SR083, LP / CD / DL) 2016
- Thomas Cohen,"Bloom Forever" / "Honeymoon" (SR082, 12” / DL) 2016
- East India Youth, 20,000 LEAGUES UNDER THE SEA (SR081, CD / DL) 2014
- Bo Ningen & Savages, Words to the Blind (POPNSR01, LP / CD / DL) 2014
- Bo Ningen, III (SR077, LP / CD / DL) 2014
- East India Youth, "HINTERLAND" (SR076, 12” / DL) 2014
- East India Youth, TOTAL STRIFE FOREVER (SR073, LP / CD / DL) 2014
- East India Youth, "DRIPPING DOWN" (SR074, 10” / DL) 2013
- Serafina Steer, Disco Compilation (SR068, 7” / DL) 2013
- Serafina Steer, The Moths Are Real (SR063, LP / CD / DL) 2013
- Bo Ningen, Line The Wall (SR060, LP / CD / DL) 2012
- Race Horses, Furniture (SR058, LP / CD / DL) 2012
- Race Horses, "My Year Abroad" (SR057, 7” / DL) 2012
- Bo Ningen, "Live at St. Leonard’s Church" (SR055, 10” / DL) 2011
- My Sad Captains, Fight Less Win More (SR052, CD / DL) 2011
- Bo Ningen, "Henkan" (SR051, 7” / DL) 2011
- Jeff The Brotherhood, We Are The Champions (SR050, CD / DL) 2011
- Various Artists, Stolen 6 (SR048, CD) 2011
- Pete And The Pirates, One Thousand Pictures (SR046, LP / CD / DL) 2011
- Jeff The Brotherherhood, Heavy Days (SR043, CD / DL) 2011
- Bo Ningen, Bo Ningen (SR042, CD / DL) 2010
- Serafina Steer, Bloody Hell (SR040, CD / DL) 2010
- The European, In a Very Real Sense Now (SR036, LP / DL) 2010
- Tap Tap, On My Way (SR032, CD / DL) 2009
- Let’s Wrestle, In the Court of Wrestling Let’s (SR028X, CD / DL) 2009
- My Sad Captains, Here and Elsewhere (SR027X, CD / DL) 2009
- Artefacts For Space Travel ‘Power of the Brain’ (SR024X, CD / DL) 2008
- Screaming Tea Party ‘Golden Blue’ (SR023X, CD / DL) 2008
- Hot Silk Pockets ‘Panda Eyes’ (SR022X, CD / DL) 2008
- Let’s Wrestle ‘Let’s Wrestle / I’m In Fighting Mode’ (SR020, 7” / DL) 2008
- Pete And The Pirates ‘She Doesn’t Belong To Me’ (SR019vinyl, 7” / DL) 2008
- Pete And The Pirates ‘Mr Understanding’ (SR017X, 7” / CD / DL) 2008
- Let’s Wrestle ‘In Loving Memory Of’ (SR016, CD / DL) 2008
- Pete And The Pirates ‘Little Death’ (SR011, LP / CD / DL) 2008
- Pete And The Pirates ‘Knots’ (SR0107inch, 7” / DL) 2007
- Matthew Sawyer and the Ghosts ‘Blue Birds Blood’ (SR009, CD / DL) 2007
- Various Artists ‘Stolen Compilation’ (SR008CD, CD / DL) 2007
- Pete And The Pirates ‘Come On Feet’ (SR007, 7” / DL) 2007
- Tap Tap ‘Lanzafame’ (SR006, CD / DL) 2006
- Screaming Tea Party ‘Death Egg’ (SR005, 10” / DL) 2007
- Pete & The Pirates ‘Wait Stop Begin’ (SR004, CD / DL) 2006
- Various Artists ‘Stolen Compilation’ (SR003, CD / DL) 2006
- Pete & The Pirates ‘Get Even’ (SR002, CD / DL) 2005
- Candy ‘Last Night’ (SR001, CD / DL) 2005

== See also ==
- List of record labels
- List of independent UK record labels
