= List of awards and nominations received by Diane Warren =

Diane Warren awards and nominations
Awards and nominations
Award	Wins	Nominations
Totals
Academy Awards	0	17
Academy of Country Music Awards	0	1
Billboard Music Awards	3	3
Black Reel Awards	1	3
Capri Hollywood International Film Festival	2	2
Critics' Choice Movie Awards	1	7
David di Donatello	0	1
Denver Film Critics Society	0	1
Georgia Film Critics Association	0	2
Gold Derby Awards	0	3
Golden Globe Awards	2	6
Golden Raspberry Awards	0	2
Grammy Awards	1	16
Guild of Music Supervisors Awards	0	2
Hawaii Film Critics Society	0	2
Hollywood Film Awards	2	2
Hollywood Music in Media Awards	5	13
Houston Film Critics Society	0	2
LA Music Awards	1	1
Latino Entertainment Journalists Association	0	2
New Mexico Film Critics	0	1
News & Documentary Emmy Awards	0	1
Online Film & Television Association	0	5
Palm Springs International Film Festival	1	1
Phoenix Film Critics Society	1	1
Primetime Emmy Awards	1	1
Santa Barbara International Film Festival	1	1
Satellite Awards	5	11
Seattle Film Critics Society	0	1
Society of Composers & Lyricists	2	8
World Soundtrack Awards	0	4
Wins	28
Nominations	122

Diane Warren is an American songwriter. The following are a list of her wins and nominations for awards in music.

She has received a Primetime Emmy Award, a Grammy Award, a Critics' Choice Movie Award, and two Golden Globe Awards. She has earned seventeen Academy Award nominations and received an Academy Honorary Award at the Governors Awards in 2022. In 2001, Warren was inducted into the Songwriters Hall of Fame and received a star on the Hollywood Walk of Fame.

== Major awards ==
=== Academy Awards ===
Year	Category	Nominated work	Result	Ref.
1987	Best Original Song	"Nothing's Gonna Stop Us Now" (from Mannequin) (Note: Shared with Albert Hammond)	Nominated	
1996	Best Original Song	"Because You Loved Me" (from Up Close & Personal)	Nominated	
1997	Best Original Song	"How Do I Live" (from Con Air)	Nominated	
1998	Best Original Song	"I Don't Want to Miss a Thing" (from Armageddon)	Nominated	
1999	Best Original Song	"Music of My Heart" (from Music of the Heart)	Nominated	
2001	Best Original Song	"There You'll Be" (from Pearl Harbor)	Nominated	
2014	Best Original Song	"Grateful" (from Beyond the Lights)	Nominated	
2015	Best Original Song	"Til It Happens to You" (from The Hunting Ground) (Note: Shared with Lady Gaga)	Nominated	
2017	Best Original Song	"Stand Up for Something" (from Marshall) (Note: Shared with Common)	Nominated	
2018	Best Original Song	"I'll Fight" (from RBG)	Nominated	
2019	Best Original Song	"I'm Standing with You" (from Breakthrough)	Nominated	
2020	Best Original Song	"Io sì (Seen)" (from The Life Ahead) (Note: Shared with Laura Pausini)	Nominated	
2021	Best Original Song	"Somehow You Do" (from Four Good Days)	Nominated	
2022	Academy Honorary Award	—N/a	Honored	
2022	Best Original Song	"Applause" (from Tell It Like a Woman)	Nominated	
2023	Best Original Song	"The Fire Inside" (from Flamin' Hot)	Nominated	
2024	Best Original Song	"The Journey" (from The Six Triple Eight)	Nominated	
2025	Best Original Song	"Dear Me" (from Diane Warren: Relentless)	Nominated	

=== Critics' Choice Movie Awards ===
Year	Category	Nominated work	Result	Ref.
1999	Best Song	"Music of My Heart" (from Music of the Heart)	Won	
2001	Best Song	"There You'll Be" (from Pearl Harbor)	Nominated	
2007	Best Song	"Do You Feel Me" (from American Gangster)	Nominated	
2010	Best Song	"You Haven't Seen the Last of Me" (from Burlesque)	Nominated	
2015	Best Song	"Til It Happens to You" (from The Hunting Ground)	Nominated	
2017	Best Song	"Stand Up for Something" (from Marshall)	Nominated	
2020	Best Song	"Io sì (Seen)" (from The Life Ahead) (Note: Shared with Laura Pausini and Niccolò Agliardi)	Nominated	

=== Emmy Awards ===
Year	Category	Nominated work	Result	Ref.
Primetime Emmy Awards
2016	Outstanding Original Music and Lyrics	"Til It Happens to You" (from The Hunting Ground)	Won	
News and Documentary Emmy Awards
2018	Outstanding Music and Sound	Cries from Syria (Note: Shared with Vicki Hiatt, Jörg Hüttner, Oleg Kulchytskyi, William V. Malpede, Kathy Nelson, Maxim Skorupskij, Vadim Stolyar, Martin Tillman, and Sebastian Zuleta)	Nominated	

=== Golden Globe Awards ===
Year	Category	Nominated work	Result	Ref.
1985	Best Original Song	"Rhythm of the Night" (from The Last Dragon)	Nominated	
1987	Best Original Song	"Nothing's Gonna Stop Us Now" (from Mannequin)	Nominated	
1996	Best Original Song	"Because You Loved Me" (from Up Close & Personal)	Nominated	
2001	Best Original Song	"There You'll Be" (from Pearl Harbor)	Nominated	
2010	Best Original Song	"You Haven't Seen the Last of Me" (from Burlesque)	Won	
2020	Best Original Song	"Io sì (Seen)" (from The Life Ahead)	Won	

=== Grammy Awards ===
Year	Category	Nominated work	Result	Ref.
1984	Best Album of Original Score Written for a Motion Picture or Television Special	Ghostbusters: Original Soundtrack Album (Note: Shared with Bobby Alessi, Tom Bailey, Elmer Bernstein, David Foster, Jay Graydon, Dave Immer, Brian O'Neal, Kevin O'Neal, Ray Parker Jr., Graham Russell, Mick Smiley, and The Doctor)	Nominated	
1987	Best Song Written Specifically for a Motion Picture or Television	"Nothing's Gonna Stop Us Now" (from Mannequin)	Nominated	
1996	Song of the Year	"Because You Loved Me"	Nominated	
1996	Best Song Written Specifically for a Motion Picture or for Television	"Because You Loved Me" (from Up Close & Personal)	Won	
1997	Song of the Year	"How Do I Live"	Nominated	
1997	Best Song Written Specifically for a Motion Picture or for Television	"How Do I Live" (from Con Air)	Nominated	
1998	Song of the Year	"I Don't Want to Miss a Thing"	Nominated	
1998	Best Song Written for a Motion Picture or for Television	"I Don't Want to Miss a Thing" (from Armageddon)	Nominated	
1999	Best Song Written for a Motion Picture, Television or Other Visual Media	"Music of My Heart" (from Music of the Heart)	Nominated	
2001	Best Song Written for a Motion Picture, Television or Other Visual Media	"There You'll Be" (from Pearl Harbor)	Nominated	
2011	Best Song Written for Visual Media	"Born to Be Somebody" (from Justin Bieber: Never Say Never)	Nominated	
2011	Best Song Written for Visual Media	"You Haven't Seen the Last of Me" (from Burlesque)	Nominated	
2013	Best Song Written for Visual Media	"Silver Lining (Crazy 'Bout You)" (from Silver Linings Playbook)	Nominated	
2015	Best Song Written for Visual Media	"Til It Happens to You" (from The Hunting Ground)	Nominated	
2017	Best Song Written for Visual Media	"Stand Up for Something" (from Marshall) (Note: Shared with Common and Andra Day)	Nominated	
2025	Best Music Film	Relentless (Note: Shared with Bess Kargman, Peggy Drexler, Michele Farinola, and Kat Nguyen)	Nominated	

== Miscellaneous awards ==
=== Academy of Country Music Awards ===
Year	Category	Nominated work	Result	Ref.
1997	Song of the Year	"How Do I Live"	Nominated	

=== Apulia Soundtrack Awards ===
Year	Category	Nominated work	Result	Ref.
2024	Guest of Honor	Herself	Won	

=== ASCAP Film and Television Music Awards ===
Year	Nominated work	Result	Ref.
Songwriter of the Year			
1990	Herself	Won	
1991	Herself	Won	
1993	Herself	Won	
1999	Herself	Won	
Pop Songwriter of the Year
1998	Herself	Won	
1999	Herself	Won	
Country Songwriter of the Year
2000	Herself	Won	
Voice of Music Award
1995	Herself	Won	
Song of the Year
1998	"How Do I Live"	Won	
Most Performed Songs
1988	"I Get Weak"	Won	
1990	"Look Away"	Won	
1990	"I Don't Wanna Live Without Your Love"	Won	
1990	"If I Could Turn Back Time"	Won	
1991	"If I Could Turn Back Time"	Won	
1991	"Blame It on the Rain"	Won	
1991	"How Can We Be Lovers?" (Note: Shared with Michael Bolton and Desmond Child)	Won	
1991	"I'll Be Your Shelter"	Won	
1991	"Love Will Lead You Back"	Won	
1991	"When I See You Smile"	Won	
1991	"When the Night Comes"	Won	
1994	"I'll Never Get Over You Getting Over Me"	Won	
1994	"Nothing Broken but My Heart"	Won	
1995	"Don't Turn Around"	Won	
1997	"Un-Break My Heart"	Won	
Most Performed Songs from Motion Pictures
1985	"Rhythm of the Night" (from The Last Dragon)	Won	
1987	"Nothing's Gonna Stop Us Now" (from Mannequin)	Won	
1996	"Because You Loved Me" (from Up Close & Personal)	Won	
1997	"For You I Will" (from Space Jam)	Won	
1997	"How Do I Live" (from Con Air)	Won	
1998	"I Don't Want to Miss a Thing" (from Armageddon)	Won	
1999	"Music of My Heart" (from Music of the Heart)	Won	
2000	"Can't Fight the Moonlight" (from Coyote Ugly)	Won	
2001	"There You'll Be" (from Pearl Harbor)	Won	
Top TV Series
2001	Star Trek: Enterprise (Note: Shared with Paul Baillargeon, David Bell, Jay Chattaway, and Dennis McCarthy)	Won	

=== Billboard Music Awards ===
Year	Category	Nominated work	Result	Ref.
1997	Songwriter of the Year	Herself	Won	
1998	Songwriter of the Year	Herself	Won	
1999	Songwriter of the Year	Herself	Won	

=== Black Reel Awards ===
Year	Category	Nominated work	Result	Ref.
2015	Outstanding Original Song	"Grateful" (from Beyond the Lights)	Nominated	
2018	Outstanding Original Song	"Stand Up for Something" (from Marshall)	Nominated	
2024	Outstanding Original Song	"The Journey" (from The Six Triple Eight) (Note: Shared with H.E.R.)	Won	

=== Capri Hollywood International Film Festival ===
Year	Category	Nominated work	Result	Ref.
2022	Best Original Song	"Applause" (from Tell It Like a Woman)	Won	
2024	Best Original Song	"The Journey" (from The Six Triple Eight)	Won	

=== Coronado Island Film Festival ===
Year	Category	Nominated work	Result	Ref.
2019	Transcendent Award	Body of Work	Awarded	

=== David di Donatello Awards ===
Year	Category	Nominated work	Result	Ref.
2020	Best Original Song	"Io sì (Seen)" (from The Life Ahead)	Nominated	

=== Denver Film Critics Society Awards ===
Year	Category	Nominated work	Result	Ref.
2015	Best Original Song	"Til It Happens to You" (from The Hunting Ground)	Nominated	

=== Georgia Film Critics Association Awards ===
Year	Category	Nominated work	Result	Ref.
2015	Best Original Song	"Til It Happens to You" (from The Hunting Ground)	Nominated	
2020	Best Original Song	"Io sì (Seen)" (from The Life Ahead)	Nominated	

=== Gold Derby Awards ===
Year	Category	Nominated work	Result	Ref.
2010	Best Original Song	"You Haven't Seen the Last of Me" (from Burlesque)	Nominated	
2015	Best Original Song	"Til It Happens to You" (from The Hunting Ground)	Nominated	
2020	Best Original Song	"Io sì (Seen)" (from The Life Ahead)	Nominated	

=== Golden Raspberry Awards ===
Year	Category	Nominated work	Result	Ref.
1997	Worst Original Song	"How Do I Live" (from Con Air)	Nominated	
1998	Worst Original Song	"I Don't Want to Miss a Thing" (from Armageddon)	Nominated	

=== Guild of Music Supervisors Awards ===
Year	Category	Nominated work	Result	Ref.
2021	Icon Award	Herself	Honored	
2024	Best Song Written and/or Recorded for a Film	"The Journey" (from The Six Triple Eight) (Note: Shared with H.E.R. and Joel C. High)	Nominated	
2025	Best Song Written and/or Recorded for a Film	"Dear Me" (from Diane Warren: Relentless) (Note: Shared with Kesha and Heather Guibert)	Nominated	

=== Hawaii Film Critics Society Awards ===
Year	Category	Nominated work	Result	Ref.
2017	Best Song	"Prayers for This World" (from Cries from Syria)	Nominated	
2020	Best Song	"Io sì (Seen)" (from The Life Ahead)	Nominated	

=== Hollywood Film Awards ===
Year	Category	Nominated work	Result	Ref.
2001	Hollywood Songwriter Award	Herself	Won	
2017	Hollywood Song Award	"Stand Up for Something" (from Marshall)	Won	

=== Hollywood Music in Media Awards ===
Year	Category	Nominated work	Result	Ref.
2015	Best Original Song – Documentary	"Til It Happens to You" (from The Hunting Ground)	Won	
2017	Best Original Song – Documentary	"Prayers for This World" (from Cries from Syria)	Nominated	
2017	Lifetime Achievement Award	Herself	Honored	
2018	Best Original Song – Documentary	"I'll Fight" (from RBG)	Won	
2018	Best Original Song – Independent Film	"To Get Here" (from The Last Movie Star)	Nominated	
2019	Best Original Song – Feature Film	"I'm Standing with You" (from Breakthrough)	Nominated	
2020	Best Original Song – Animated	"Free" (from The One and Only Ivan)	Nominated	
2021	Best Original Song – Documentary	"(Never Gonna) Tame You" (from The Mustangs: America's Wild Horses)	Nominated	
2021	Best Original Song – Independent Film	"Somehow You Do" (from Four Good Days)	Nominated	
2022	Best Original Song – Independent Film	"Applause" (from Tell It Like a Woman)	Won	
2023	Best Original Song – Feature Film	"The Fire Inside" (from Flamin' Hot)	Nominated	
2023	Best Original Song – TV Show/Limited Series	"One Step Closer" (from Jane)	Nominated	
2024	Best Original Song – Feature Film	"The Journey" (from The Six Triple Eight)	Won	
2025	Best Original Song – Documentary	"Dear Me" (from Diane Warren: Relentless)	Won	

=== Houston Film Critics Society Awards ===
Year	Category	Nominated work	Result	Ref.
2010	Best Original Song	"You Haven't Seen the Last of Me" (from Burlesque)	Nominated	
2020	Best Original Song	"Io sì (Seen)" (from The Life Ahead)	Nominated	

=== Ischia Global Film & Music Festival ===
Year	Category	Nominated work	Result	Ref.
2023	Ischia William Walton Legend Award	Herself	Won	

=== LA Music Awards ===
Year	Category	Nominated work	Result	Ref.
1992	Songwriter of the Year	Herself	Won	

=== Latino Entertainment Journalists Association Awards ===
Year	Category	Nominated work	Result	Ref.
2020	Best Song	"Io sì (Seen)" (from The Life Ahead)	Nominated	
2023	Best Song	"The Fire Inside" (from Flamin' Hot)	Nominated	

=== New Mexico Film Critics Awards ===
Year	Category	Nominated work	Result	Ref.
2017	Best Original Song	"Prayers for This World" (from Cries from Syria)	Nominated	

=== Online Film & Television Association Awards ===
Year	Category	Nominated work	Result	Ref.
1996	Best Original Song	"Because You Loved Me" (from Up Close & Personal)	Nominated	
1997	Best Original Song	"How Do I Live" (from Con Air)	Nominated	
1998	Best Original Song	"I Don't Want to Miss a Thing" (from Armageddon)	Nominated	
2001	Best Original Song	"There You'll Be" (from Pearl Harbor)	Nominated	
2015	Best Original Song	"Til It Happens to You" (from The Hunting Ground)	Runner-up	

=== Palm Springs International Film Festival ===
Year	Category	Nominated work	Result	Ref.
2010	Frederick Loewe Award for Film Composing	Burlesque	Won	

=== Phoenix Film Critics Society Awards ===
Year	Category	Nominated work	Result	Ref.
2010	Best Original Song	"You Haven't Seen the Last of Me" (from Burlesque)	Won	

=== Santa Barbara International Film Festival ===
Year	Category	Nominated work	Result	Ref.
2015	Artisan Award	"Til It Happens to You" (from The Hunting Ground)	Won	

=== Satellite Awards ===
Year	Category	Nominated work	Result	Ref.
1998	Best Original Song	"I Don't Want to Miss a Thing" (from Armageddon)	Won	
2001	Best Original Song	"There You'll Be" (from Pearl Harbor)	Nominated	
2007	Best Original Song	"Do You Feel Me" (from American Gangster)	Nominated	
2010	Best Original Song	"You Haven't Seen the Last of Me" (from Burlesque)	Won	
2015	Best Original Song	"Til It Happens to You" (from The Hunting Ground)	Won	
2017	Best Original Song	"Prayers for This World" (from Cries from Syria)	Nominated	
2017	Best Original Song	"Stand Up for Something" (from Marshall)	Won	
2021	Best Original Song	"Io sì (Seen)" (from The Life Ahead)	Won	
2022	Mary Pickford Award	—N/a	Honored	
2022	Best Original Song	"Applause" (from Tell It Like a Woman)	Nominated	
2023	Best Original Song	"The Fire Inside" (from Flamin' Hot)	Nominated	
2024	Best Original Song	"The Journey" (from The Six Triple Eight)	Nominated	

=== Seattle Film Critics Society Awards ===
Year	Category	Nominated work	Result	Ref.
2015	Best Original Song	"Til It Happens to You" (from The Hunting Ground)	Nominated	

=== Education Through Music-Los Angeles ===
Year	Category	Nominated work	Result	Ref.
2026	Shining Star Artist	Herself	Won	

=== Society of Composers & Lyricists ===
Year	Category	Nominated work	Result	Ref.
2019	Outstanding Original Song for Visual Media	"I'm Standing with You" (from Breakthrough)	Nominated	
2020	Outstanding Original Song for Visual Media	"Free" (from The One and Only Ivan)	Nominated	
2021	Outstanding Original Song for a Dramatic or Documentary Visual Media Production	"(Never Gonna) Tame You" (from The Mustangs: America's Wild Horses)	Nominated	
2021	Outstanding Original Song for a Dramatic or Documentary Visual Media Production	"Somehow You Do" (from Four Good Days)	Nominated	
2022	Outstanding Original Song for a Dramatic or Documentary Visual Media Production	"Applause" (from Tell It Like a Woman)	Won	
2023	Outstanding Original Song for a Comedy or Musical Visual Media Production	"The Fire Inside" (from Flamin' Hot)	Nominated	
2024	Outstanding Original Song for a Dramatic or Documentary Visual Media Production	"The Journey" (from The Six Triple Eight)	Won	
2025	Outstanding Original Song for a Dramatic or Documentary Visual Media Production	"Dear Me" (from Diane Warren: Relentless)	Nominated	

=== Transatlantyk Festival ===
Year	Category	Nominated work	Result	Ref.
2018	Transatlantyk Golden Ark Independent Spirit Award	Herself	Won	

=== Women in Film Crystal + Lucy Awards ===
Year	Category	Nominated work	Result	Ref.
2006	Crystal Award	Herself	Won	

=== World Soundtrack Awards ===
Year	Category	Nominated work	Result	Ref.
2001	Best Original Song Written for a Film	"Where the Dream Takes You" (from Atlantis: The Lost Empire) (Note: Shared with James Newton Howard)	Nominated	
2008	Best Original Song Written for a Film	"Do You Feel Me" (from American Gangster)	Nominated	
2011	Best Original Song Written for a Film	"You Haven't Seen the Last of Me" (from Burlesque)	Nominated	
2015	Best Original Song Written for a Film	"Grateful" (from Beyond the Lights)	Nominated	

== Special honors ==
=== The Hollywood Reporter and Billboard ===
Year	Honor	Result	Ref.
2008	Film and TV Music Career Achievement Award	Honored	

=== Hollywood Walk of Fame ===
Year	Honor	Result	Ref.
2001	Hollywood Walk of Fame	Inducted	

=== Polar Music Prize ===
Year	Honor	Result	Ref.
2020	Polar Music Prize	Won	

=== Songwriters Hall of Fame ===
Year	Honor	Result	Ref.
2001	Songwriters Hall of Fame	Inducted	
