= Rain Parade =

American band

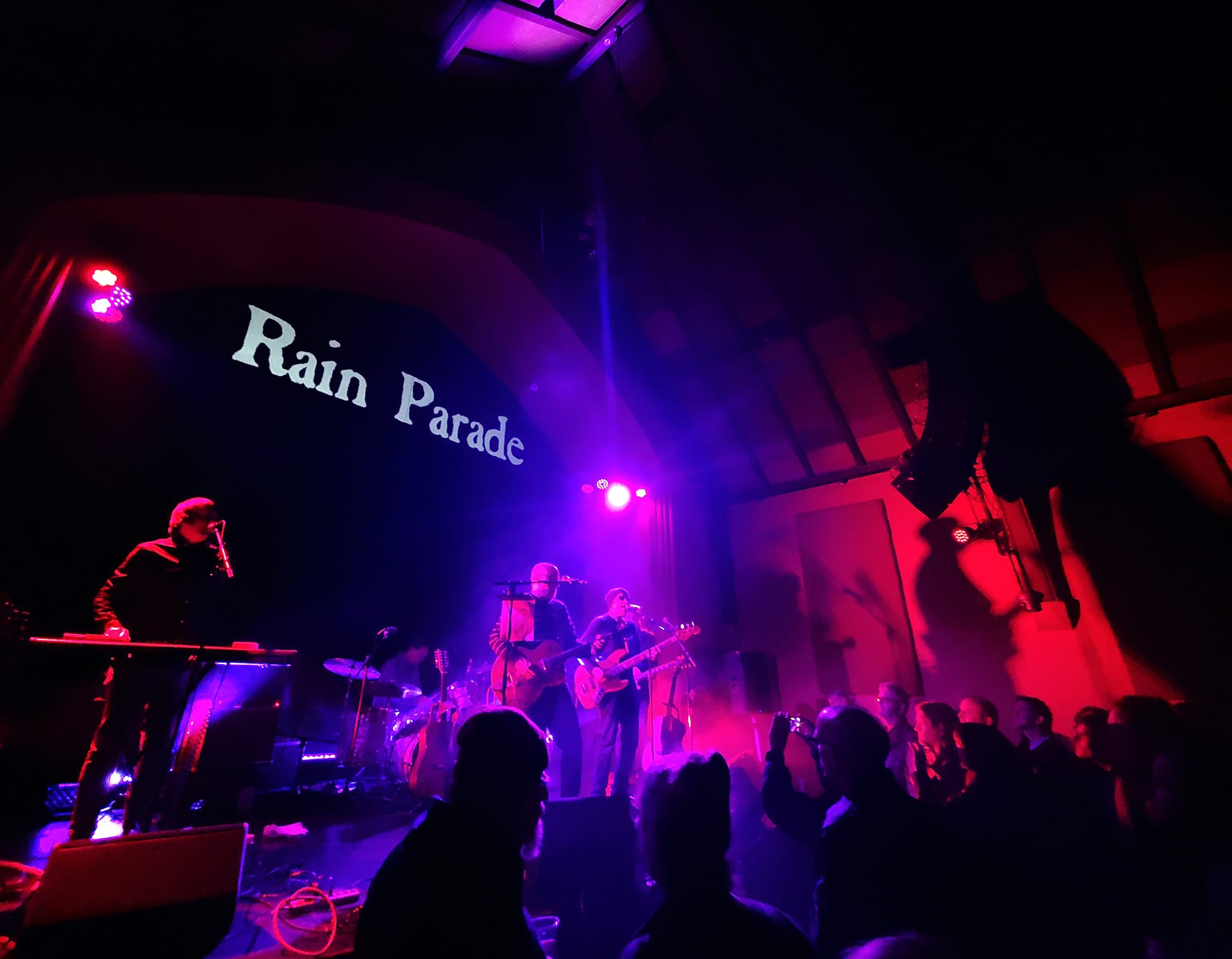
- Rain Parade live at the Chapel, San Francisco, May 4, 2023

Background information
- Origin: Los Angeles, California, U.S.
- Genres: Paisley Underground, psychedelic rock
- Years active: 1981–1986, 1988, 2012–present
- Labels: Enigma; Zippo; Island; Wave; 090; Label 51
- Members: Matt Piucci; Steven Roback; John Thoman; Stephan Junca
- Past members: David Roback: Mark Hanley; Derek See; Will Glenn; Eddie Kalwa; Mark Marcum; Gil Ray; Alec Palao
- Website: rainparadeofficial.com

Rain Parade is a band that was originally active in the Paisley Underground scene in Los Angeles in the 1980s, and that reunited and resumed touring in 2012.

== History ==
=== Rain Parade in the 1980s (1981–1986) ===
Originally called the Sidewalks, the band was founded in Los Angeles by college roommates Matt Piucci (guitar, vocals) and David Roback (guitar, vocals) in 1981, who had attended Carleton College together. David's brother Steven Roback (bass, vocals) joined the band shortly thereafter. David and Steven had been in a band called the Unconscious with neighbor Susanna Hoffs (who went on to become a member of the Bangles, the most famous of the Paisley Underground bands). The band soon added Will Glenn (keyboards and violin) and later Eddie Kalwa (drums). They self-released their debut single, "What She's Done to Your Mind" on their Llama label in 1982.

In 1983, they released their debut album, Emergency Third Rail Power Trip, on the Enigma/Zippo label. Critic Jim DeRogatis would later write in his book Turn on Your Mind: Four Decades of Great Psychedelic Rock (2003) that "Emergency Third Rail Power Trip is not only the best album from any of the Paisley Underground bands, it ranks with the best psychedelic rock efforts from any era", with uplifting melodies offset by themes that were "dark and introspective." According to DeRogatis, the album showcased "the Robacks' ethereal vocals, Eddie Kalwa's precise drumming, Will Glenn's colorful sitar, violin, and keyboard accents, and an intricate, chiming, but droney two-guitar attack that picks up where the Byrds left off with 'Eight Miles High.'"

After David Roback left to form a new band, Opal, the rest of the band continued to record as a four-piece, releasing the mini-LP Explosions in the Glass Palace in 1984. NME would later write, in praise of Explosions in the Glass Palace: "Sound cathedrals? We got 'em ... mind-meltingly beautiful guitar sounds, employed sparingly and dynamically amid dark, dizzy tales of murder, madness and drug paranoia." The song "No Easy Way Down" was cited as a "mantra for an altered state of mind, and testament to a band who, however fleetingly, made music that sounded like the best drugs ever."

After the release of a single, "You Are My Friend", drummer Eddie Kalwa left and was replaced by Mark Marcum, with John Thoman (guitar, vocals) also added to the line-up.

The band was signed to Island Records, and recorded a live album in Japan called Beyond the Sunset. Their third album, Crashing Dream, came out in 1985.

=== Breakup and other projects (1986–2012) ===
The band split in 1986, reforming briefly in 1988 to finish a double album they had started, which was never released.

Piucci would go on to release the LP Can't Get Lost When You're Goin' Nowhere with Tim Lee, under the band name Gone Fishin'. He later joined Crazy Horse.

Steven Roback went on to form the band Viva Saturn whose debut release appeared on the San Francisco label Heyday Records, which was run at the time by Pat Thomas of the band Absolute Grey. Viva Saturn went on to release two additional LPs, Soundmind and Brightside.

In 1983–1984, David Roback made the psychedelic folk album Rainy Day, consisting of cover versions performed by various members of the Paisley Underground scene that Roback had enlisted, under the name Rainy Day. He then formed the band Clay Allison – which became Opal, featuring former Dream Syndicate bassist Kendra Smith (who also appears on Rainy Day). Following the dissolution of Opal, Roback formed Mazzy Star in 1989 with singer-songwriter Hope Sandoval, who had joined Opal to perform with them the previous year, taking over lead vocals from Smith upon the latter's departure during a European tour.

Keyboardist Will Glenn was also a member of the Rainy Day project, the Three O'Clock, and Viva Saturn, and recorded with Mazzy Star under the name William Cooper. Glenn died of cancer on March 16, 2001.

Mark Marcum joined the heavy metal band Savage Grace after leaving Rain Parade, and appeared on the 1986 album After the Fall from Grace and a 1987 EP, Ride into the Night.

=== Reunion and comeback (2012–present) ===
The Rain Parade reformed in 2012, performing their comeback gig on December 20, 2012, at Cafe Du Nord in San Francisco on a sold out bill with Powder and the Bang Girl Group Revue. The Rain Parade lineup included original members Matt Piucci, Steven Roback and John Thoman, augmented by Mark Hanley, Alec Palao and former Game Theory drummer Gil Ray. This lineup also performed at The EARL in Atlanta, Georgia, on January 19, 2013, in a benefit for Bobby Sutliff of the Windbreakers, who had been injured in a car accident.

In December 2013, Rain Parade played two nights with three other reunited Paisley Underground bands—the Bangles, the Dream Syndicate, and the Three O'Clock—at The Fillmore in San Francisco (December 5) and The Fonda Theatre in Los Angeles (December 6, a benefit concert for Education Through Music-Los Angeles).

In 2014, drummer Gil Ray gave up performing due to health concerns, and was replaced in the lineup by returning member Stephan Junca. Ray died of cancer in 2017.

Three new recordings by Rain Parade were released in November 2018 as part of a compilation album called 3 × 4, which also included the Dream Syndicate, the Bangles, and the Three O'Clock, with each of the four bands covering songs by the other three. Following the initial Record Store Day First release as a double album on "psychedelic swirl" purple vinyl, Yep Roc Records released the album on LP, CD, and digital in February 2019.

David Roback died from metastatic cancer on February 25, 2020.

The band released their first studio album in 38 years, Last Rays of a Dying Sun, on August 4, 2023.

Their follow up EP "Last Stop On The Underground" was released on May 24, 2024. ,

== Discography ==
=== Albums ===
- Emergency Third Rail Power Trip (1983, Enigma/Zippo) – UK Indie No. 5
- Crashing Dream (1985, Island)
- Last Rays of a Dying Sun (2023, Flat Iron)
- Last Stop On The Underground (2024, Flat Iron)

=== Live albums and compilations ===
- Beyond the Sunset (Live in Tokyo 1984) (1985) Restless/Island (UK No. 78)
- Demolition (1991) – outtakes and unreleased material
- Emergency Third Rail Power Trip/Explosions in the Glass Palace (1992) Mau Mau
- Perfume River (2002) – live in New York, November 1984
- 3 × 4 (2018 compilation) Yep Roc Records No. 27 Billboard Independent Albums

=== Singles and EPs ===
- "What She's Done to Your Mind" b/w "Kaleidoscope" (1982) Llama DK002
- Explosions in the Glass Palace mini-LP (1984) Enigma/Zippo (UK Indie No. 4)
- "Sad Eyes Kill" (1984)
- "You Are My Friend" (1985) Enigma/Zippo (UK Indie No. 28)

== See also ==
- Crazy Horse
- Mazzy Star
- Opal
- Viva Saturn
