= Emergency Third Rail Power Trip =

Studio album by Rain Parade
- Released: 1983
- Recorded: February – March 1983
- Studio: Contour Studios, Los Angeles, California; Radio Tokyo Studios, Los Angeles, California ("Saturday's Asylum" and "Kaleidoscope")
- Genre: Paisley Underground; psychedelic pop; jangle pop
- Length: 41:51
- Label: Enigma (US); Zippo (UK)
- Producer: David Roback; Rain Parade; Ethan James

Rain Parade chronology
Emergency Third Rail Power Trip (1983)	Crashing Dream (1985)

Emergency Third Rail Power Trip is the debut album by American rock band Rain Parade, released in 1983. It is one of the most prominent records in the Paisley Underground movement of the 1980s.

== Critical reception ==
Professional ratings
Review scores
Source	Rating
AllMusic	5/5 stars
Classic Rock	7/10
Mojo	4/5 stars
PopMatters	9/10
Q	4/5 stars
Record Mirror	5/5 stars
Shindig!	5/5 stars
Sounds	5/5 stars
Uncut	8/10
The Village Voice	C+

In a contemporary review for The Village Voice, music critic Robert Christgau felt that Rain Parade imitates "dumb" music from the psychedelic era, specifically "the wimpy singing, wispy tunes, unsure drumming, repetitive guitar effects, and naïve world view of, oh, Kaleidoscope, Morning Glory, Aum." Sounds reviewer Edwin Pouncey, however, praised the "gentle and complex quality" of the band's songs and wrote that "the Parade stroke the fevered brow of Mr Fantasy to revive pop music out of its present coma with the gentle touch."

AllMusic's Denise Sullivan would later state that Rain Parade was "clearly way ahead of their time," adding that "it would take years before sleepy music ... would catch on." As a result, the "traditional, gentle psychedelic pop" of the record "sounds no more made in the '80s than in the '60s or '90s." In his 2003 book Turn On Your Mind: Four Decades of Great Psychedelic Rock, critic Jim DeRogatis stated, "Emergency Third Rail Power Trip is not only the best album from any of the Paisley Underground bands, it ranks with the best psychedelic rock efforts from any era", with uplifting melodies offset by themes that were "dark and introspective." DeRogatis added:

Songs such as "What's She Done to Your Mind," "Kaleidoscope," and "Look at Merri" showcase Piucci and the Robacks' ethereal vocals, Eddie Kalwa's precise drumming, Matt Piucci's colorful sitar, Will Glenn's violin and keyboard accents, and an intricate, chiming, but droney two-guitar attack that picks up where the Byrds left off with "Eight Miles High."

Musician and critic Scott Miller, in his 2010 book Music: What Happened?, cited "1 Hour 1/2 Ago" as one of 1983's best songs, calling Rain Parade "core practitioners" of the Paisley Underground movement, with Emergency Third Rail Power Trip being "probably the most certifiably trippy of the branded projects."

== Track listing ==
1. "Talking in My Sleep" (Matt Piucci, David Roback) – 3:49
2. "This Can't Be Today" (Steven Roback, Piucci) – 4:36
3. "I Look Around" (D. Roback) – 3:07
4. "1 Hour 1/2 Ago" (S. Roback, D. Roback) – 4:14
5. "Carolyn's Song" (D. Roback) – 4:05
6. "What She's Done to Your Mind" (Piucci, D. Roback) – 2:56
7. "Look at Merri" (Piucci, D. Roback, S. Roback) – 6:34
8. "Saturday's Asylum" (S. Roback, Piucci) – 3:45
9. "Kaleidoscope" (S. Roback) – 5:35
10. "Look Both Ways" (Piucci) – 3:10

=== 2024 vinyl reissue bonus disc ===
1. "What She's Done to Your Mind" (single version) (Piucci, D. Roback) – 3:09
2. "This Can't Be Today" (4-track version) (S. Roback, Piucci) – 4:16
3. "I Look Around" (4-track version) (D. Roback) – 3:02
4. "Look Both Ways" (4-track version) (Piucci) – 3:24
5. "Saturday's Asylum" (live) (S. Roback, Piucci) – 3:42
6. "First of September" (live) (S. Roback, D. Roback) – 4:50
7. "What You've Done" (demo) (S. Roback, D. Roback) – 3:33
8. "Look at Merri" (demo) (Piucci, D. Roback, S. Roback) – 5:25
9. "Paper Girl" (live) (Piucci, S. Roback) – 2:28
10. "Speedway" (live) (D. Roback) – 1:58
11. "No Good Trying" (live) (Syd Barrett) – 3:23
12. "Unexpected" (live) (Piucci, D. Roback) – 3:42
13. "Time Machine" (rehearsal demo) (S. Roback, Piucci) – 1:08

Vinyl reissue notes

- Track 1 recorded by Ethan James at Radio Tokyo Studios, Los Angeles, 1982. Released as a single in 1982; featuring Michael Murphy on drums.
- Tracks 2–4 recorded in late 1982 on 4-track by Vitus Mataré; featuring Brian Norris on drums. Tracks 2 and 3 previously released on the WarfRat Tales compilation in 1983; track 4 previously released on the extended CD version WarfRat Tales (Unabridged) in 2005.
- Tracks 5 and 6 recorded live at CBGB, New York City, October 12, 1983.
- Tracks 7, 8 and 13 recorded in 1982.
- Tracks 9 and 10 recorded live in Los Angeles, 1983.
- Track 11 recorded live at the Anti Club, Los Angeles, January 20, 1983.
- Track 12 recorded live in 1983; venue and exact date unknown.

== Personnel ==
Adapted from the album liner notes.

Rain Parade

- David Roback – vocals, guitar, percussion
- Matt Piucci – vocals, guitar, sitar, harmonica
- Steven Roback – vocals, bass
- Will Glenn – keyboards, violin
- Eddie Kalwa – drums

Additional musicians

- Michael Murphy – drums on "Kaleidoscope"
- Kendra Smith – backing vocals on "This Can't Be Today"
- Amrit – backing vocals on "This Can't Be Today"

Technical

- David Roback – producer
- Rain Parade – producer
- Ethan James – engineer; co-producer on "Saturday's Asylum"
- Eddy Schreyer – mastering
- David Arnoff – back cover photography
