= Derek See =

American musician

Derek See (born June 6, 1975) is an American musician, music producer and music writer. He currently performs with Meadow Gallery, and has performed as a soloist as well as with The Chocolate Watchband, The Gentle Cycle, Dean Wareham, The Bang Girl Group Revue, Joel Gion & The Primary Colours, Myron & E, and The Rain Parade, and Careless Hearts. See began playing guitar with The Chocolate Watchband in the fall of 2015, and also plays in Country Joe McDonald's Electric Music Band.

After meeting Iggy and the Stooges guitarist James Williamson, interviewing him for a Fretboard Journal magazine article, See rehearsed and played guitar at a concert with Williamson at The Blank Club in San Jose on September 5, 2009. A recording of the performance was released by Easy Action Records in 2010 as James Williamson & The Careless Hearts Live At The Blank Club.

See became Williamson's guitar roadie for Stooges touring, and has played keyboards onstage with the band during "Penetration." See also plays lead guitar in the Bay Area retro girl group "The Bang Girl Group Revue" and is a record collector; his website "Derek's Daily 45" is a resource for information about 45 RPM records from the 1960s.

See also played guitar and sang (as Derek Cullimore) for psychedelic rockers I, Sharko, who released an album on Bomp! Records in 1996. See also writes for Shindig Magazine, Premier Guitar Magazine and Acoustic Guitar Magazine.

== Discography ==
- 1995: I, Sharko: I, Sharko (Bomp Records, guitar, vocal, keyboards)
- 2003: Derek See: Derek See
- 2004: Resplendent: I Am Free (guitar)
- 2006: Derek See: Adobe Creek
- 2006: Careless Hearts : Careless Hearts (guitar, vocal, production)
- 2008: Careless Hearts: Hearts Delight (guitar, vocal)
- 2010: James Williamson with Careless Hearts : Live At The Blank Club (guitar, liner notes)
- 2011: The Bang: Another Notch On His Belt (7" 45)
- 2012: The Bang Girl Group Revue: Soul Shangri-La (guitar, production) (Psychedelphonic Records CD, LP- red vinyl limited to 100 copies, rest black)
- 2013: Derek See: She Came This Way / McQueen (Slight Return) (Psychedelphonic Records 7" 45 vinyl, digital EP)
- 2014: Derek See: U Line (Trip Two) / Love Is The Plan (Psychedelphonic Records 7" 45 vinyl)
- 2014: The Bang Girl Group Revue with Joel Gion: Hey Mr Beatmaker (guitar, production) (Psychedelphonic Records 7" 45 vinyl)
- 2017: The Gentle Cycle: The Gentle Cycle (guitar, vocal, production)
- 2017: The Hellenes: I Love You All The Animals (guitar, vocal)
- 2018: The Chocolate Watchband This Is My Voice (guitar, vocal)
- 2018: The Bangles Dream Syndicate Three O'Clock Rain Parade 3 x 4 (guitar, vocals with Rain Parade)
- 2022: The Gentle Cycle: Landslide Eyes (guitar, vocal, keyboards, bass guitar)
- 2023: Rain Parade: Last Rays Of A Dying Sun (guitar, vocals, keyboards)

== Videography ==
- 2011: Iggy & The Stooges: In The Hands Of The Fans
