= Brightside (Viva Saturn album) =

Studio album by Viva Saturn
- Released: 1995
- Genre: Alternative rock
- Label: Restless
- Producer: Matt Piucci, Steven Roback

Viva Saturn chronology
| Soundmind (1992) | Brightside (1995) | Ships of Heaven (1998, unreleased) |

Brightside is an album by the American band Viva Saturn, released in 1995. It was the band's final album, as Restless Records chose not to release 1998's Ships of Heaven.

== Production ==
The album was produced by Matt Piucci and Steven Roback, former bandmates in the Rain Parade. It closes with a cover of "One for My Baby", a song made popular by Frank Sinatra; the cover first appeared on the Sinatra tribute album, Chairman of the Board: Interpretations of Songs Made Famous by Frank Sinatra. Roback wrote or cowrote nine of the 11 songs.

== Critical reception ==
Professional ratings
Review scores
| Source | Rating |
|---|---|
| AllMusic | 4/5 stars |
| The Province | 2/5 stars |

Trouser Press thought that "the somber 'String Me Out a Line' conveys aching loneliness with haunting clarity, its gentle acoustic instrumentation and quiet vocal harmonies making it Brightside's most memorable track." Stereo Review called the album "a well-crafted slice of retro-psychedelic pop-rock." The Stafford Post noted the "road-friendly rockers" and "drowsy psychedelia."

The Province opined that, "as Piucci and Roback were members of Rain Parade, a major player in L.A.'s Paisley Underground scene of the mid-'80s, Viva Saturn could also be seen by both as a chance to resolve some unfinished aspects of their past... Unfortunately, Brightside, while attractive, is less substantial than any of their other projects." Billboard concluded that Piucci "is especially impressive; his stint backing Neil Young in Crazy Horse is noticeable in his taut, laconic lead work."

AllMusic wrote that "Roback's detached, nasal twang blends nicely into an atmospheric backdrop of textured guitars, piano accents and feedback." The Rough Guide to Rock determined that the album "continued [the Rain Parade's] journey, rediscovering the plaintive melodicism mislaid in their 1988 comeback."

== Track listing ==
| No. | Title | Length |
|---|---|---|
| 1. | "Send a Message" |
| 2. | "Black Cloud" |
| 3. | "Brightside" |
| 4. | "Here Comes April" |
| 5. | "Abandoned Car" |
| 6. | "String Me Out a Line" |
| 7. | "Mourn the Light" |
| 8. | "Distracted" |
| 9. | "Nothing Helps" |
| 10. | "Heart of You" |
| 11. | "One for My Baby" |
