= 46th NAACP Image Awards =

American entertainment awards for 2014 works

- Date: February 6, 2015
- Site: Los Angeles, California
- Hosted by: Anthony Anderson
- Official website: NAACPImageAwards.net

The 46th NAACP Image Awards, presented by the NAACP, honored outstanding representations and achievements of people of color in motion pictures, television, music and literature during the 2014 calendar year. The 46th ceremony was hosted by Anthony Anderson and broadcast on TV One.

The nominees were announced on December 14, 2014. In Motion Picture categories Ava DuVernay's film Selma received the most nominations with eight, while in television the TV categories Black-ish, Orange Is the New Black and Scandal all scored six noms each. Pharrell Williams and Beyoncé scored the most music nominations, with four each.

Spike Lee was honored with the President's Award and former Attorney General of the United States Eric Holder was honored with the Chairman's Award. Taraji P. Henson was recognized with the Entertainer of the Year.

== Special awards ==
President's Award
- Spike Lee
Chairman's Award
- Eric Holder
Vanguard Award
- Clive Davis
Entertainer of the Year
- Taraji P. Henson

== Motion Picture ==
All nominees are listed below with the winners listed in bold.

=== Outstanding Motion Picture ===
- Belle
- Beyond the Lights
- Dear White People
- Get On Up
- **Selma**

=== Outstanding Actor in a Motion Picture ===
- Chadwick Boseman – Get On Up
- **David Oyelowo – Selma**
- Denzel Washington – The Equalizer
- Idris Elba – No Good Deed
- Nate Parker – Beyond the Lights

=== Outstanding Actress in a Motion Picture ===
- Gugu Mbatha-Raw – Belle
- Quvenzhané Wallis – Annie
- **Taraji P. Henson – No Good Deed**
- Tessa Thompson – Dear White People
- Viola Davis – The Disappearance of Eleanor Rigby

=== Outstanding Supporting Actor in a Motion Picture ===
- Andre Holland – Selma
- Cedric the Entertainer – Top Five
- **Common – Selma**
- Danny Glover – Beyond the Lights
- Wendell Pierce – Selma

=== Outstanding Supporting Actress in a Motion Picture ===
- Viola Davis – Get On Up
- **Carmen Ejogo – Selma**
- Jill Scott – Get On Up
- Octavia Spencer – Get On Up
- Oprah Winfrey – Selma

=== Outstanding Independent Motion Picture ===
- **Belle**
- Dear White People
- Half of a Yellow Sun
- Jimi: All Is by My Side
- Life of a King

=== Outstanding Directing in a Motion Picture ===
- Amma Asante – Belle
- Ava DuVernay – Selma
- **Antoine Fuqua** **–The Equalizer**
- Gina Prince-Bythewood – Beyond The Lights
- John Ridley – JIMI: All Is By My Side

== Television ==
=== Outstanding Drama Series ===
- Being Mary Jane
- Grey's Anatomy
- House of Cards
- How to Get Away with Murder
- Scandal

=== Outstanding Comedy Series ===
- black-ish
- House of Lies
- Key & Peele
- Orange Is the New Black
- Real Husbands of Hollywood

=== Outstanding Talk Series ===
- Oprah Prime
- Steve Harvey
- The Queen Latifah Show
- The View
- The Wendy Williams Show

=== Outstanding Variety (Series or Special) ===
- BET Awards 2014
- Family Feud
- On the Run Tour: Beyoncé and Jay-Z
- Oprah's Master Class
- UNCF An Evening of Stars

=== Outstanding Actor in a Drama Series ===
- LL Cool J – NCIS: Los Angeles (CBS)
- Shemar Moore – Criminal Minds (CBS)
- Omar Epps – Resurrection (ABC)
- Omari Hardwick – Being Mary Jane (BET)
- Taye Diggs – Murder in the First (TNT)

=== Outstanding Actress in a Drama Series ===
- Nicole Beharie – Sleepy Hollow (FOX)
- Kerry Washington – Scandal (ABC)
- Octavia Spencer – Red Band Society (FOX)
- Gabrielle Union – Being Mary Jane (BET)
- Viola Davis – How to Get Away with Murder (ABC)

=== Outstanding Supporting Actor in a Drama Series ===
- Alfred Enoch – How to Get Away with Murder (ABC)
- Courtney B. Vance – Masters of Sex (Showtime)
- Guillermo Diaz – Scandal (ABC)
- Jeffrey Wright – Boardwalk Empire (HBO)
- Joe Morton – Scandal (ABC)

=== Outstanding Supporting Actress in a Drama Series ===
- Aja Naomi King – How to Get Away with Murder (ABC)
- Alfre Woodard – State Of Affairs (NBC)
- Chandra Wilson – Grey's Anatomy (ABC)
- Jada Pinkett Smith – Gotham (FOX)
- Khandi Alexander – Scandal (ABC)

=== Outstanding Host in a Talk, Reality, News/ Information or Variety (Series or Special) ===
- Steve Harvey – Steve Harvey (Syndicated)
- Queen Latifah – The Queen Latifah Show (Syndicated)
- Chris Rock – BET Awards 2014 (BET)
- Gwen Ifill – America After Ferguson (PBS)
- Melissa Harris-Perry – Melissa Harris-Perry (MSNBC)

=== Outstanding Television Movie, Mini-Series or Dramatic Special ===
- American Horror Story: Freak Show (FX)
- Drumline: A New Beat (VH1)
- The Gabby Douglas Story (Lifetime)
- A Day Late and a Dollar Short (Lifetime)
- The Trip To Bountiful (Lifetime)

=== Outstanding Actor in a Television Movie, Mini-Series or Dramatic Special ===
- Blair Underwood – The Trip To Bountiful (Lifetime)
- Charles S. Dutton – Comeback Dad (UP)
- Larenz Tate – Gun Hill (BET)
- Mekhi Phifer – A Day Late and a Dollar Short (Lifetime)
- Ving Rhames – A Day Late and a Dollar Short (Lifetime)

== In Memoriam ==
The song "Jesus is Love" by the Commodores was played during the "In Memoriam" segment.

- Maya Angelou
- Tony Gwynn
- Mario Cuomo
- Joe Sample
- Chester Nez
- Bobby Womack
- Anna Gordy Gaye
- Casey Kasem
- Lowell Steward
- Rubin Carter
- Yuri Kochiyama
- Alice Coachman
- Andraé Crouch
- Meshach Taylor
- Ernie Banks
- Big Bank Hank
- Dollree Mapp
- Joe Wilder
- Ruby Dee
- Marion Barry
- William G. Mays
- Frankie Knuckles
- Edward Brooke
- Jonathan Hicks
- Jimmy Ellis
- Geoffrey Holder
- Charlie Sifford
- Jimmy Ruffin
- Stuart Scott
