= No Way Out (The Chocolate Watchband album) =

Studio album by The Chocolate Watchband
- Released: September 1967
- Recorded: Mid-1967
- Studio: American Recording Studios, Los Angeles, California
- Genre: Garage rock; proto-punk; psychedelic rock
- Length: 28:37
- Label: Tower
- Producer: Ed Cobb

The Chocolate Watchband chronology
No Way Out (1967)	The Inner Mystique (1968)

Singles from No Way Out
- 1. "Are You Gonna Be There (At the Love-In)" Released: October 1967

Professional ratings
Review scores
Source	Rating
Allmusic	4/5 stars

No Way Out is the debut album by the American garage rock band The Chocolate Watchband, and was released in September 1967 on Tower Records (see 1967 in music). It blended both garage and psychedelic rock influences, and was marked by distorted guitar instrumentals that were early examples of protopunk. It features the band's harder-edged interpretations of songs, with only three original compositions. The album was preceded by two non-album singles, "Sweet Young Thing" and "Misty Lane", and track singles, "No Way Out" and "Are You Gonna be There (At the Love-in)". However, none of the singles managed to chart. Like its singles, No Way Out failed to reach the Billboard 200, but it established the group as a popular live act, and later became noted as a garage rock classic.

== Background ==
Recording sessions took place in mid-1967 at American Recording Studios, located in Los Angeles, California, with record producer, Ed Cobb. Progress on the album was rapid, although the percussion, harmonica, and vocals were overdubbed onto the tracks after the initial instrumental recordings were complete. The band held little power in the recording studio as Cobb selected the compositions that appeared on the album. Only "Gone and Passes By" was an original song written by a Chocolate Watchband member. In all, only four tracks included the whole band, and were released in their intended form. The remaining songs replaced David Aguilar's vocals with session musician Don Bennett and added embellished instrumentals. Music critic Bruce Eder described the material on the album as "highly potent, slashing, exciting, clever pieces of music".

Even though the original tracks were tampered with, and did not actually feature the complete band, the songs still achieved an equal balance of gritty garage rock and the druggy ambiance of psychedelic rock. Of all the experimentally punkish tracks and Jagger-esque vocals, the centerpiece of the album ironically did not feature Aguilar as the lead vocalist. The opening track, "Let's Talk About Girls" became a favorite among the Chocolate Watchband's followers, despite Bennett being credited as the lead singer. In 1972, the song was included in the compilation album Nuggets: Original Artyfacts from the First Psychedelic Era, 1965-1968.

The album was released in September 1967, but was mistakenly distributed on Tower Records' Uptown label, a division that mainly promoted blues musicians. Although the album was largely overlooked at the time of its release and had gone out of print by the early 1970s, its reputation has continued to expand over the years. The late 1980s saw the revival of interest in garage rock and, more specifically, the band's music, so in 1993 the album was reissued by Big Beat Records in 1993 as No Way Out...Plus. The reissue included eight bonus tracks. In 1994, the album was made available, along with the group's second album, The Inner Mystique, by Revenge Records titled, No Way Out/The Inner Mystique. Since then, Sundazed Music has released the album in 1994, 2009, and 2012.

== Track listing ==
1. "Let's Talk About Girls" (Manny Freiser) – 2:30
2. "In the Midnight Hour" (Steve Cropper, Wilson Pickett) – 4:26
3. "Come On" (Chuck Berry) – 1:50
4. "Dark Side of the Mushroom" (Bill Cooper, Richard Podolor) – 2:26
5. "Hot Dusty Roads" (Steve Stills) – 2:26
6. "Are You Gonna Be There (At the Love-In)" (Don Bennett, Ethon McElroy) – 2:24
7. "Gone and Passes By" (David Aguilar) – 3:09
8. "No Way Out" (Ed Cobb) – 2:25
9. "Expo 2000" (Podolor) – 2:33
10. "Gossamer Wings" (Bennett, McElroy) – 3:34

=== No Way Out...Plus bonus tracks ===
11. "Sweet Young Thing" (Cobb) – 2:57
12. "Baby Blue" (Bob Dylan) – 3:13
13. "Misty Lane" (Monty Siegel) – 3:16
14. "She Weaves a Tender Trap" (Cobb) – 2:39
15. "Milk Cow Blues" (Kokomo Arnold) – 2:57
16. "Don't Let the Sun Catch You Crying" (Les Chadwick, Les Maguire, Freddie Marsden, Gerry Marsden) – 2:51
17. "Since You Broke My Heart" (Don Everly) – 2:51
18. "Misty Lane" (alternate take) (Siegel) – 3:06

== Personnel ==
=== Musicians ===
- David Aguilar – lead vocals
- Gary Andrijasevich – drums
- Bill Flores – bass guitar
- Mark Loomis – lead guitar
- Sean Tolby – rhythm guitar
- Don Bennett – lead vocals
- Unknown – organ

=== Technical ===
- Ed Cobb – producer
- Bill Cooper – engineer
- Richard Podolor – engineer
