= The Chocolate Watchband =

American garage rock band

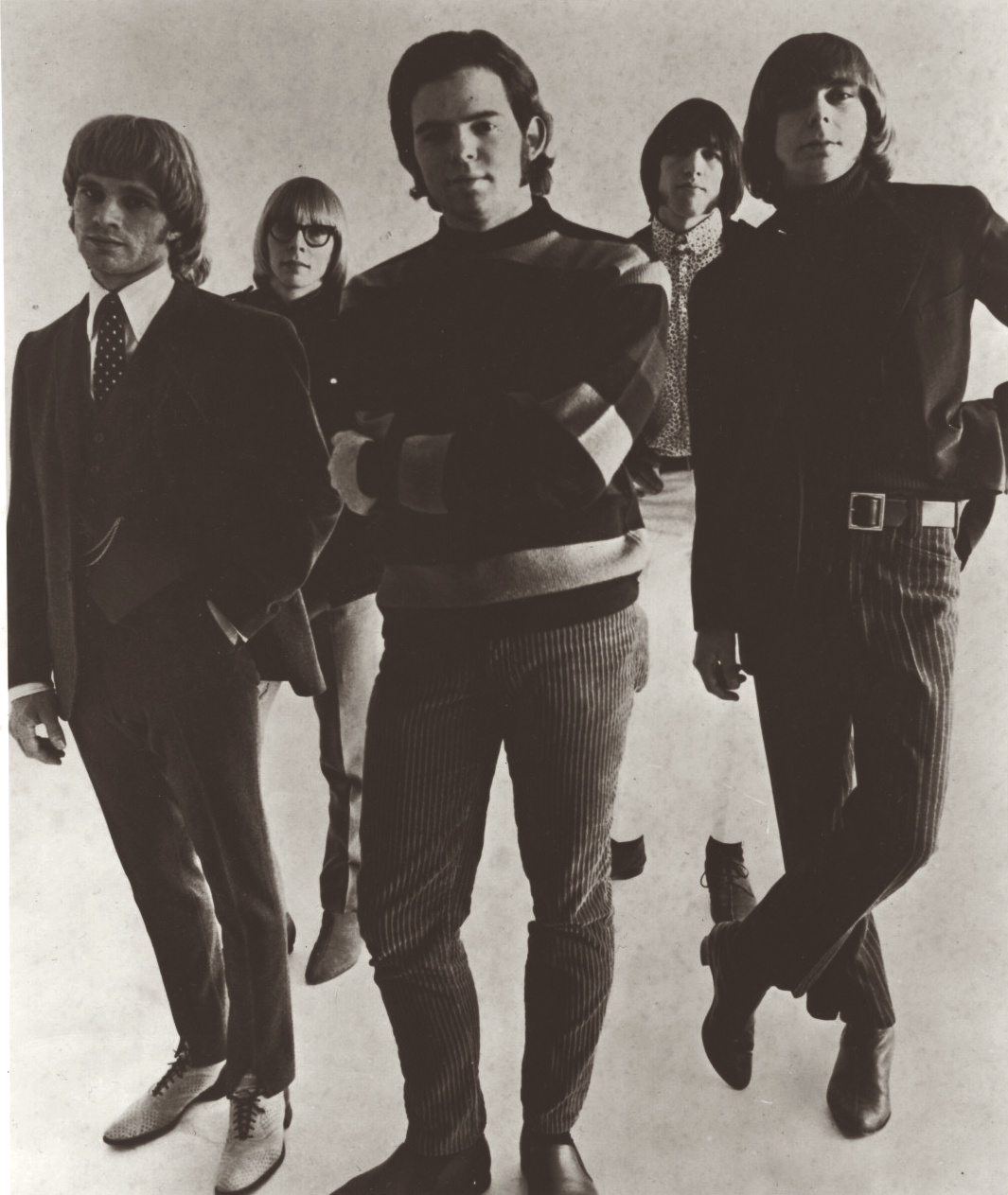
- Publicity photo c. 1966. Front L-R: Sean Tolby, Gary Andrijasevich and Bill Flores. Back L-R: Mark Loomis and David Aguilar

Background information
- Also known as: The Hogs
- Origin: Los Altos, California, U.S.
- Genres: Psychedelic rock; garage rock; proto-punk
- Years active: 1965–1970; 1999–present
- Label: Tower
- Members: See members section
- Website: thechocolatewatchband.com

The Chocolate Watchband are an American garage rock band that formed in 1965 in Los Altos, California. The band went through several lineup changes during its existence. Combining psychedelic and garage rock components, their sound was marked by David Aguilar's lead vocals and songwriting, as well as proto-punk musical arrangements. The band's rebellious musical posture made them one of the harder-edged groups of the period with one critic labeling them as America's answer to the Rolling Stones.

The Chocolate Watchband was signed to Tower Records in 1966 and released their first single, "Sweet Young Thing", in 1967. Later in the year, the band released their debut album, No Way Out. Although the album did not chart nationally, the band had a huge following in San Jose and the San Francisco Bay Area. In 1968, their second album, The Inner Mystique, was released and included the band's most popular song, a cover version of "I'm Not Like Everybody Else". By 1969, with Mark Loomis dropping out in the middle of the recording sessions, the band released a final album, One Step Beyond, however it did not include David Aguilar on vocals and was not as highly regarded or indicative of their past work. The Chocolate Watchband officially broke up in 1970 with no intent of ever reuniting; however, they reunited in 1999.

== History ==
=== 1965: early line-up ===
The Chocolate Watchband was formed in the summer of 1965 in Los Altos, California by Ned Torney and Mark Loomis, who had previously played guitar together in a local band known as The Chaparrals in the previous year. The two were joined by Rich Young (bass guitar), Pete Curry (drums), Jo Kemling (organ), and Danny Phay (lead vocals) to form the first version of the Chocolate Watchband, a name that was originally meant to be taken as a joke. All five musicians had a background rooted in rock and roll and blues, with each one having spent time on the local club circuit. The band garnered a local following, integrating cover versions of British Invasion groups, particularly The Who, into their live repertoire. Curry was soon replaced by Gary Andrijasevich, a jazz drummer from Cupertino High School. They never recorded any commercial releases, but rare demos by the group appeared in the 1990s. The band was gaining popularity until Torney and Phay accepted an offer from a rival band, The Otherside, to join their group. Kemling followed soon after, effectively dismantling the first incarnation of the band.

=== 1966–67: Loomis–Aguilar line-up ===
With the first version of the Chocolate Watchband disbanded, Mark Loomis moved on to join The Shandels. Quickly becoming disillusioned, he took the discarded name "Chocolate Watchband" and recruited The Shandels' bass player Bill 'Flo' Flores and former Watchband drummer, Gary Andrijasevich. Next he convinced former Topsiders guitarist Dave "Sean" Tolby to enlist. The group recruited David Aguilar as the frontman and lead singer; at the time, Aguilar was a college student studying biology at San Jose State University.

Loomis naturally asserted the role of leader during this initial time period, although the band never acknowledged it had a designated leader. Songs to cover were presented, shows were talked about, the band voted together on all decisions. Sean Tolby obtained the latest in Vox equipment while Loomis provided the space for nightly rehearsals. Within a week, the band began performing at local clubs in San Francisco's South Bay, playing a range of songs that included obscure British import tunes that hadn't been released in the US, so that unlike other local bands who were covering the latest hits from the Top 10, the Chocolate Watchband played songs few people had heard before. Thus, in many instances, these songs became associated with the Chocolate Watchband and not the original artists.

Six months later, after opening for the Mothers of Invention at the Fillmore Auditorium, San Francisco music producer Bill Graham urged the Chocolate Watchband to sign a management contract with him. He was opening up a new Fillmore East in New York City and wanted to shuttle the Chocolate Watchband, the Grateful Dead, and Jefferson Airplane back and forth from coast to coast as his personal house bands. However, having signed a management contract with local promoter Ron Roupe a week earlier, their future followed a different path. Roupe, having secured a recording deal with Green Grass Productions in Los Angeles, introduced the band to producers Ed Cobb and Ray Harris. The band flew to Los Angeles and entered the recording studio; as a warm-up to show Cobb their capabilities, they quickly recorded tracks for "Come On," a Chuck Berry song that had also been the first single recorded by the Rolling Stones, to whom the band was frequently compared. Cobb introduced the band to a song he had written a week earlier named "Sweet Young Thing". Released in December 1966 by Tower Records, the B-side featured the group's cover of Bob Dylan's "It's All Over Now, Baby Blue", another song the band regularly played live. However, unknown to the Watchband, Tower Records farmed the distribution of their recordings out to Uptown Records, a rhythm and blues label with predominantly black artists.

Frontman Aguilar began writing material for the band, including originals like "Right By My Side", "Gone & Passes By", "Don't Need Your Lovin' Anymore", "No Way Out" and "Sitting There Standing." The band's second single was the more restrained track "Misty Lane", released with a sweet orchestrated ballad, "She Weaves a Tender Trap", as its B-side. During this period the band were featured in two Sam Katzman films: Riot on Sunset Strip and The Love-Ins. The latter film inspired the group's next single; "Are You Gonna Be There At The Love-In", which was written and recorded in one day. The single was released with the B-side "No Way Out", an instrumental spawned from a studio warm-up with spontaneous Aguilar vocals that Cobb later took credit for. In late 1967, shortly after the release of their first album, No Way Out (1967) Aguilar left for university studies in science while the other members searched for ways to continue playing music.

=== 1967–69: reformation and dissolution ===
Loomis and Andrijasevich would depart after Aguilar, leaving Tolby and Flores with the duty of fulfilling a month's worth of bookings. They decided to enlist the services of Tim Abbott, Mark Whittaker and Chris Flinders, members of the San Francisco Bay Blues Band. The band still maintained a level of success, but the sound and style differed from the original band. They managed to secure a place as the opening act for The Doors, and also performed at the KFRC Magic Mountain Festival—the first rock music festival in the United States—among thirty other bands in June 1967. The group played several dates, including the Oakland Coliseum until late 1967, when Abbott and Flinders had a disagreement with Tolby and manager Ron Roupe over financial matters, which ensured the indefinite break-up of the Watchband in December 1967.

During recording sessions for the Chocolate Watchband's second album, The Inner Mystique, the band chafed at Cobb's influence because he presented them as being more instrumentally refined on record than they were live. Less than half of the featured studio work was by official members of the band; the majority of the record featured session musicians, and a singer named Don Bennett contributed vocals on the track "Let's Talk About Girls." The album also included a song written by Cobb, "Medication", which was already done by The Standells, who Cobb also managed.

The band reformed in late 1968 for a short period of time, with Danny Phay, the group's original vocalist in its 1965 inception, re-joining the band, as well as guitarist Ned Torney; bassist Bill Flores and guitarist Sean Tolby from the 1967 line-up remained. A third studio album, One Step Beyond, was recorded with Cobb again using session musicians, and sometimes entire ghost bands, to record portions of it. It was a commercial failure except for the songs written and sung by David Aguilar that were put in on the album from past recording sessions. One of the tracks - "Devil's Motorcycle" - featured Moby Grape guitarist Jerry Miller.

=== 1999–present: revival ===
After their dissolution in 1970, a revival of interest in psychedelic and garage rock in the late 1980s and 1990s brought the group to public attention, and their original vinyl releases became collector's items, selling among private sellers for over USD$100. Rhino Records issued a best-of release of the band in 1983, while Sundazed and other labels re-issued the original albums on compact discs, including bonus tracks. After leaving the band, its members each embarked on other non-musical pursuits; Aguilar had worked as an astronomy professor after the band's dissolution.

Continued interest prompted the band to reunite in 1999, with Dave Aguilar, Tim Abbott (replacing Mark Loomis, who backed out of the reunion), Bill Flores, and Gary Andrijasevich; Michael Reese was added as guitarist in place of Sean Tolby. The group began to touring internationally in 2000, culminating in a show at New York's Cavestomp and a live album, At the Love-In Live! in 2001. They also issued a studio album,Get Away, in between the Cavestomp show and the live album. The group has since performed in Europe and the United States. In 2005, Melts in Your Brain . . . Not on Your Wrist, a two-CD compilation of the Chocolate Watchband's complete Tower and Uptown recordings, was released.

In June 2013, the Chocolate Watchband made it back to a recording studio in their hometown San Jose, to begin a new album. From 2015 to the present (2018), the band's lineup is Tim Abbott on lead guitar and vocals; Gary Andrijasevich on drums; David Aguilar on vocals, keyboards, and harmonica; Alec Palao on bass and backing vocals; and Derek See on guitar and vocals. The resulting album (This Is My Voice) was released in 2019 to critical acclaim; the lead off single 'Secret Rendezvous' was featured as 'Coolest Song In The World' on Little Steven's Underground Garage program in February 2019.

The first song recorded was a tribute to Sky Saxon who had recently died. Founding member Mark Loomis died on September 26, 2014, in Hawaii.

From David Aguilar:

This is a sad moment for all of us in the band. I never quite understood Mark's withdrawal and leaving, but in later years he expressed deep regret in breaking up the band. However, at that point in time there was no way to revive that magical moment in time. I always marveled at his guitar work and as time passed, my admiration for his musical abilities and unique guitar playing grew like the expanding universe. I can't express how sad I feel knowing all that is now permanently behind us. In my heart all I can say is thank you Mark for making the Watchband happen. And thank you for selecting me as your lead singer. With our fans - your musical notes will always play on.

== Members ==
- Danny Phay - lead vocals (1965; 1968–69)
- David Aguilar - lead vocals, harmonica, keyboards, guitars, synths (1966–67; 1999–present)
- Bill Flores - bass, backing vocals (1966–69; 1999–2001)
- Mark Loomis - lead guitar, keyboards (1965–67; 1968–69)
- Sean Tolby - rhythm guitar (1966–67; 1968–69)
- Gary Andrijasevich - drums, backing vocals (1965–67; 1968–69; 1999–present)
- Chris Flinders - lead vocals (1967)
- Tim Abbott - lead guitar (1967; 1999–present)
- Mark Whittaker - drums (1967)
- Ned Torney - guitar (1965; 2003-2004; keyboards 1968-69)
- Michael Reese - guitar (1999–2001)
- Alec Palao - bass, backing vocals (2001–present)
- Derek See - guitar, vocals, keyboards (2015–present)
- Jo Kemling - keyboards (1965–66)
- Rich Young - bass (1965)
- Daryl Hooper - keyboards, guitar (2012–2015)

== Discography ==
=== Albums ===
- No Way Out (Tower ST 5096) (1967)
- The Inner Mystique (Tower ST 5106) (1968)
- One Step Beyond (Tower ST 5153) (1969) (as The Chocolate Watchband)
- Get Away (Orchard 3716) (2000)
- This Is My Voice (Dirty Water Records DWC1117) (2019)

=== Compilations ===
- The Best of the Chocolate Watchband (Rhino RNLP-108) (1983)
- Forty Four (Big Beat WIKA 25) (1984)
- Melts in Your Brain...Not On Your Wrist! (Big Beat CDWIK2 249) (2005)
- Revolutions Reinvented (Twenty Stone Blatt BAMF 41) (2012)
- I'm Not Like Everybody Else (Purple Pyramid) (2015)

=== Live ===
- At the Love-In Live! (Roir 8272) (2001)

=== Singles ===
- "Sweet Young Thing" b/w "Baby Blue" (Uptown 740) (1967)
- "Misty Lane" b/w "She Weaves a Tender Trap" (Uptown 749) (1967)
- "Are You Gonna Be There (At the Love-In)" b/w "No Way Out" (Tower 373) (1967)
