= The Inner Mystique =

Studio album by The Chocolate Watchband
- Released: February 1968
- Recorded: January 1968
- Genre: Psychedelic rock; garage rock
- Length: 27:30
- Label: Tower
- Producer: Ed Cobb

The Chocolate Watchband chronology
No Way Out (1967)	The Inner Mystique (1968)	One Step Beyond (1969)

Professional ratings
Review scores
Source	Rating
Allmusic	link

The Inner Mystique is the second album by the American garage rock band The Chocolate Watchband (shown as Chocolate Watch Band), and was released in 1968 by Tower Records.

This album is the most well-known released material from the band. However, the original first side is not played by the actual group members.

Don Bennett sings on the first side with studio musicians assembled by producer Ed Cobb. Watchband vocalist David Aguilar and the rest of the band return to record the second side. This side is composed of all cover songs, most notably "I'm Not Like Everybody Else", originally by The Kinks. The two tracks, originally sung by David Aguilar, "Medication" and "Let's Go, Let's Go, Let's Go" featured Don Bennett instead. Ed Cobb was responsible for the change. Cobb had it so Aguilar's vocals were removed and Bennett's were dubbed in its place for the album's release.

== Track listing ==
1. "Voyage of the Trieste" (Ed Cobb) – 3:41
2. "In the Past" (Wayne Proctor) – 3:08
3. "Inner Mystique" (Cobb) – 5:37
4. "I'm Not Like Everybody Else" (Ray Davies) – 3:42
5. "Medication" (Ben Di Tosti, Minette Alton) – 2:08
6. "Let's Go, Let's Go, Let's Go" (Hank Ballard) – 2:18
7. "Baby Blue" (Bob Dylan) – 3:14
8. "I Ain't No Miracle Worker" (Annette Tucker, Nancie Mantz) – 2:53

Sundazed Music issued newly remastered CD & vinyl LP editions in 2012.

== Personnel ==
- David Aguilar - lead vocals, harmonica, percussion backing vocals
- Sean Tolby - lead guitar
- Mark Loomis - rhythm guitar, harpsichord
- Bill Flores - bass guitar
- Gary Andrijasevich - drums
