= Crashing Dream =

Studio album by Rain Parade
- Released: 1985
- Recorded: September 1985
- Studios: Cherokee, Los Angeles, California
- Length: 31:34
- Label: Island
- Producer: Steve Gronback

Rain Parade studio album chronology
Emergency Third Rail Power Trip (1983)	Crashing Dream (1985)	Last Rays of a Dying Sun (2023)

Crashing Dream is the second album by the American band Rain Parade, released in 1985 by Island Records.

== Critical reception ==
Professional ratings
Review scores
Source	Rating
AllMusic	2/5 stars
The Encyclopedia of Popular Music	3/5 stars
The Rolling Stone Album Guide	3.5/5 stars

Writing in Trouser Press, reviewers held forth praise for just one song ("Depending on You") and remarked that "the album is attractive but flimsy — competent technique in search of a spine and a direction. In other words, it sounds like the work of a band on the verge of breaking up — which, in fact, Rain Parade did not long after the album's release." In a separate review published in Creem, Ira Robbins described the band's various musical appropriations and concluded that "Rain Parade is all dressed up – in other people's clothes – with no place to go." The Los Angeles Times noted that "the lyrics written by Paraders Matt Piucci and Steve Roback tend to drag down the complete aural experience these guys seem to be going for."

== Track listing ==
All tracks are written by Matt Piucci and Steven Roback, except where noted.

1. "Depending on You" – 3:33
2. "My Secret Country" (Piucci, Roback, Will Glenn) – 3:17
3. "Don't Feel Bad" – 3:20
4. "Mystic Green" – 3:49
5. "Sad Eyes Kill" – 3:13
6. "Shoot Down the Railroad Man" – 3:23
7. "Fertile Crescent" – 3:38
8. "Invisible People" (Piucci, Roback, John Thoman) – 3:05
9. "Gone West" – 3:44
10. "Only Business" – 1:45

== Personnel ==
Adapted from the album liner notes.

Rain Parade

- Matt Piucci – vocals, guitar, sitar
- Steven Roback – vocals, bass, piano
- Will Glenn – keyboards
- Mark Marcum – drums, percussion
- John Thoman – guitar, backing vocals

Technical

- Steve Gronback – producer, engineer
- Scott Church – engineer
- Doug Sax – mastering
- Brian D. Mclaughlin – art direction, design, photography
- Lauren Sperling – design
