= Absolute Grey =

American rock band

- Origin: Rochester, New York, United States
- Genres: Alternative rock, jangle pop
- Years active: 1983–1990
- Labels: Midnight Records; Di Di Records
- Members: Matt Kitchen (guitar); Beth Brown (vocals); Mitchell Rasor (bass); Pat Thomas (drums)

Absolute Grey were an alternative rock–jangle pop band formed in September 1983 in Rochester, New York, United States. The group's original lineup comprised drummer Pat Thomas (who later founded Heyday Records), guitarist Matt Kitchen, vocalist Beth Brown and bassist Mitchell Rasor.

The band's debut release was a six-song cassette, followed by the Green House mini-LP in December 1984. They then signed to Midnight Records, and two years after their debut released What Remains, produced by Tim Lee of The Windbreakers. Thomas left in 1987, later releasing a series of solo albums, and Kitchen also left, leaving Brown and Rasor to continue, with the acoustic Painted Post EP released in mid-1987. A live album recorded in 1984 followed, released on the Greek Di-Di label, before the original line-up came back together to record their final album, Sand Down the Moon.

After disbanding in 1990, an expanded reissue of A Journey Through the Past was released in 2001. In 2003 a remixed edition of Green House: 20th Anniversary Edition with a bonus disc of live recordings was released. The band reunited, and announced plans for a new album in 2004, although nothing was released.

== Discography ==
=== Albums ===
- Green House (1984), Earring
- What Remains (1986), Midnight
- A Journey Through the Past (live) (1988), Di-Di
- Sand Down the Moon (1989), Di-Di
- Green House - 20th Anniversary (2004)

=== Compilations ===
- Broken Promise (1993)

=== EP's and singles ===
- Painted Post EP (1987), Midnight
