= Beyond the Lights (soundtrack) =

Soundtrack album by various artists
- Released: November 10, 2014
- Recorded: 2013–2014
- Genre: R&B, soul, hip hop
- Length: 45:32
- Label: Relativity Music Group
- Producer: Various

Beyond the Lights is the original soundtrack to the 2014 film, Beyond the Lights. It was released on November 10, 2014, through Relativity Music Group and consists of contemporary R&B and soul. The soundtrack includes songs performed by the film's fictional characters Noni (Gugu Mbatha-Raw) and Kid Culprit (Machine Gun Kelly), in addition to the Academy Award-nominated song, "Grateful", performed by Rita Ora and written by Diane Warren. The song subsequently also received a nomination at the 2015 Black Reel Awards.

== Track listing ==
1. "Blackbird" - India Jean-Jacques - 1:36
2. "Masterpiece" - Kid Culprit / Noni - 2:57
3. "Extraordinary Love [Fall Version]" - Stacy Barthe - 4:40
4. "Lights and Camera" - Yuna - 3:33
5. "Give It All To Me" - Mavado featuring Nicki Minaj - 3:34
6. "C'mon Boy" - Kid Culprit / Noni - 3:00
7. "Fly Before You Fall" - Cynthia Erivo - 3:04
8. "Just Girly Things" - Dawin - 3:57
9. "Private Property" - Kid Culprit / Noni - 4:11
10. "Shelter" - Birdy - 3:43
11. "Worthy" - Jacob Banks - 3:18
12. "Blackbird" - Noni - 3:54
13. "Grateful" - Rita Ora - 4:05

== Credits ==
- The-Dream - Composer
- Diane Warren — Composer

== Miscellaneaneous ==
The tracks "Drunk in Love" performed by Beyoncé & Jay-Z, "I Am Light" by India.Arie and "Don't Let Me Down" by Amel Larrieux, which feature prominently in the movie, do not appear on the soundtrack. Additionally, the track "Grateful" has been covered by the a cappella gospel choir Impact Repertory Choir of Harlem. A music video for "Masterpiece" performed by Kid Culprit (Machine Gun Kelly) and Noni (Gugu Mbatha-Raw) was also released.

== Charts ==
=== Album ===
Chart (2014)	Peak position
Billboard Top Soundtracks	11
Billboard Top R&B Albums	44

=== Single ===
Title	Chart (2014)	Peak position
"Just Girly Things"	Hot Dance/Electronic Songs	28
