= Heyday Records =

- Founded: 1988
- Founder: Pat Thomas
- Distributor: Rough Trade Records
- Country of origin: U.S.
- Location: San Francisco, California
- Official website: www.heyday.com

Heyday Records is an independent record label founded in 1988 by Pat Thomas. Rolling Stone has called Heyday "one of the ten most adventurous small labels in the world."

The label, later run by Ron Gompertz and Robert Rankin Walker, has released music of various genres over the course of its existence. Some of the early artists that helped Heyday evolve were Steven Roback of Rain Parade, Jack Waterson of Green on Red, Barbara Manning, Miles Corbin of the Aqua Velvets, and label founder Pat Thomas as a recording artist.

Over the years, Heyday has released works by artists such as Roback's Viva Saturn, Penelope Houston (of The Avengers), Chris Von Sneidern, Club Foot Orchestra, Connie Champagne, Buck Naked and the Bare Bottom Boys, The Dave and Deke Combo (featuring Deke Dickerson), Baby Snufkin, The Aquamen, and Aqua Velvets. The label's artists also include Marty Willson-Piper, Tommy Tutone, David J. (of Bauhaus and Love and Rockets) and Jay Aston. The label's releases in 2014 included albums by Noctorum (featuring Marty Willson-Piper of The Church), Gino and the Lone Gunmen, and The Forty Nineteens.
