= Viva Saturn =

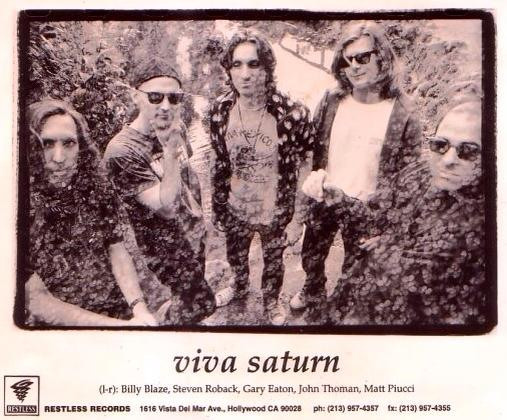

Background information
- Origin: Los Angeles, California, United States
- Genres: Alternative rock
- Years active: 1989–1998
- Labels: HeyDay, World Service/Rough Trade, DiDi, Normal, Restless
- Spinoff of: Rain Parade
- Past members: Steven Roback; John Thoman; Matt Piucci; Will Glenn; Ross Inden; Carlo Nuccio; Billy Blaze; Gary Eaton

Viva Saturn was an alternative/neo-psychedelic rock group from Los Angeles, California, founded by Steven Roback of Rain Parade. The band was active from 1989 to 1998.

== History ==
When Rain Parade decided to take a break in 1988, Steven Roback formed a new project, Viva Saturn, with fellow Rain Paraders John Thoman and Will Glenn. The band's first release, a mini-LP called Viva Saturn, was released on Pat Thomas' San Francisco-based Heyday Records and World Service/Rough Trade UK in 1989.

The following year, after Glenn left to join David Roback's Mazzy Star, the band relocated to San Francisco, where Rain Parade co-founder Matt Piucci joined to play guitar and assist with studio production.

Over the next few years the band used various musicians, including Ross Inden (bass guitar) and Carlo Nuccio (drums) to record a series of acclaimed neo-psychedelic albums, including Soundmind (1992), featuring guest appearances from Green on Red's Jack Waterson and Chris Cacavas, and Barbara Manning of 28th Day.

This was followed in 1995 with the more pop, but still electro-acoustic psychedelia-rooted album, Brightside.

The band recorded a final album, Ships of Heaven, in 1998, but this has not been released.

After Viva Saturn, Roback embarked on solo recording projects, joined by his former Rain Parade bandmantes Piucci and Thoman.

In 2012, Steven Roback and Matt Piucci reformed Rain Parade and resumed touring and recording new studio material.

== Discography ==
- Viva Saturn (1989) Heyday/World Service
- Soundmind (1994) Heyday/Normal
- Brightside (1995) Restless
- Ships of Heaven (1998) (unreleased)
