= Lowell Steward =

Tuskegee Airmen (1919–2014)

- Lowell Steward (1943)
- Born: February 25, 1919; Los Angeles, California, US
- Died: December 17, 2014 (aged 95); Ventura, California, US
- Military career
- Allegiance: United States
- Branch: United States Airforce, United States Army Air Corps
- Service years: 1942–1946
- Rank: Captain
- Units: 100th Fighter Squadron, 332nd Fighter Group
- Awards: Congressional Gold Medal awarded to Tuskegee Airmen; Distinguished Flying Cross; European-African-Middle Eastern Campaign Medal; Air Medal with four oak leaf clusters

Lowell Steward (February 25, 1919 – December 17, 2014) was born in Los Angeles and was a member of the Tuskegee Airmen who flew missions during World War II. For his service, he received the Distinguished Flying Cross and other medals.

== Tuskegee Airmen ==
After Steward graduated from college and when the Army Air Corps began allowing blacks to enlist and become pilots, he enlisted in 1942. According to Steward, the US Air Force brought together black men—specifically black athletes—from throughout the US to be trained at Tuskegee Institute. When they were initially deployed in Europe, they were initially ignored and often called the "Spookwaffe". Their mission was to fly fighter aircraft to escort bombers. Once their reputation for providing effective air support for bombers became widely known, they started receiving special request for bomber support.

Steward describe how he became a Tuskegee Airman:

When I left school to sign up for the air force, I found out I could not go into the service with my friends. I was the only black on the basketball team. We had decided among ourselves that we would all go into the air force. The others did. When I went down to sign up, they didn't know what to do with me. Just told me they couldn't send me to the air force. Ten months later I was finally called. That's when they decided what they could do with me. I was sent to Tuskegee, an all-segregated base, deep in the heart of Alabama. (p. 187)

After receiving segregated training at the Tuskegee Army Air Field, he was sent to Italy in 1944 with the 100th Fighter Squadron. From Capodichino Air Base in Naples, Italy he flew a number of missions in Bell P-39 Airacobras and Curtiss P-40 Warhawks. He was subsequently based in Ramitelli Airfield where he flew many more missions in North American P-51 Mustangs. In total, he flew 143 missions.

After the war and after his return to Los Angeles, he helped to organize the Los Angeles chapter of Tuskegee Airmen, Inc. and to found a scholarship foundation in the name of the Tuskegee Airmen. In 2007, Steward attended President George W. Bush's presentation of the Tuskegee Airmen with the Congressional Gold Medal.

== Biography ==
Steward was born in Los Angeles and was a childhood friend of Jackie Robinson. He attended Jefferson High School. In 1937, he entered Santa Barbara State College where he would become the first black captain of the Gauchos team. In 1941, he led the Gauchos to the semifinals of the 1941 NAIA Division I men's basketball tournament but was not allowed to play because he was black. Steward graduated from college in 1941 with a business degree. He met his wife Helen in Santa Barbara, California and married her in Los Angeles in 1943. They had one son and two daughters.

In 1942, when United States Army Air Forces began to allow blacks enter and become pilots, Steward was allowed to enlist and he was sent to the Tuskegee Institute for training. After his military discharge in 1946, he returned to Los Angeles with his wife to buy a house but they were not able to secure a mortgage because they were black. Because of this, he went to real estate school and obtained a real estate license. In the 1950s he helped to integrate parts of Los Angeles by facilitating home sales.

On December 14, 2014, he came down with a cold that led to pneumonia. He died on December 17 in Community Memorial Hospital of natural causes at the age of 95. His wife Helen died 10 years earlier in 2004 after 60 years of marriage.

== See also ==
- Dogfights (TV series)
- Executive Order 9981
- Freeman Field Mutiny
- List of Tuskegee Airmen
- Military history of African Americans
- The Tuskegee Airmen (movie)
- Tuskegee Airmen
