= Last Rays of a Dying Sun =

Studio album by Rain Parade
- Released: August 4, 2023
- Studio: 25th Street Recording (Oakland, California); Wally Sound (Oakland, California); Skyline Studio (Oakland, California); Babwe Sound (Los Angeles, California)
- Genre: Psychedelic pop; jangle pop
- Length: 39:34
- Label: Label 51 Recordings
- Producer: Jim Hill

Rain Parade studio album chronology
Crashing Dream (1985)	Last Rays of a Dying Sun (2023)

Last Rays of a Dying Sun is the third studio album by American band Rain Parade, released through Label 51 Recordings on August 4, 2023. It is their first studio album since their reformation in 2012, and their first in 38 years, following Crashing Dream (1985). It includes guest appearances by Debbi Peterson and Vicki Peterson of the Bangles, and the Moore Brothers.

== Critical reception ==
Professional ratings
Aggregate scores
Source	Rating
Metacritic	69/100
Review scores
Source	Rating
AllMusic	3.5/5 stars
Americana UK	8/10
The Arts Desk	3/5 stars

Last Rays of a Dying Sun received a score of 69 out of 100 on review aggregator Metacritic based on four critics' reviews, indicating "generally favorable" reception. Mojo felt that "the age is clear in the voices of Matt Piucci and Steven Roback, but so is the honesty inside songs that mine lost brothers, opportunities, and time", while Uncut stated that "the best tracks gently slip their moorings, as with the sour fuzzed guitar and damaged lyrics of 'Got the Fear', and hazy warp and alchemical concerns of the insinuatingly addictive 'Green'". Classic Rock remarked that its "gilded vocal harmonies and gently chiming guitars are uppermost as the band move through subtle variants of form and texture".

Mark Deming of AllMusic wrote that Last Rays of a Dying Sun "sounds just like a Rain Parade album – the approach is a bit more aggressive and the tunes sound a bit more down to earth, and yet this is an absolutely credible 21st Century version of their trademark approach", concluding that it "begins a new chapter in their story with impressive strength and vision, and finds the Paisley Underground heroes still as gifted and capable as one could hope". Kieron Tyler of The Arts Desk found it to be an album "about continuity. It does not matter how this point has been reached, or even how disjointed the path has been as it's manifestly a Rain Parade album, one thankfully lacking the thinness of its 1985 predecessor Crashing Dream".

== Track listing ==
All tracks are written by Matt Piucci and Steven Roback.

Last Rays of a Dying Sun track listing
No.	Title	Length
1.	"Angel Sister"	3:52
2.	"Last Rays of a Dying Sun"	4:20
3.	"Couldn't Stand to Be Alone"	2:34
4.	"Bring You Back"	3:13
5.	"Got the Fear"	3:03
6.	"Share Your Love"	2:43
7.	"Sundays Almost Gone"	3:54
8.	"Green"	3:36
9.	"Forgetfulness"	4:04
10.	"Other Side of You"	3:32
11.	"Left the Fire"	4:43
Total length:		39:34

== Personnel ==
Adapted from the album liner notes.

Rain Parade

- Matt Piucci – vocals, guitar, keyboards, harmonica, baritone guitar, sitar, bass
- Steven Roback – vocals, bass, acoustic guitar
- John Thoman – guitar, vocals
- Derek See – guitar, keyboards, vocals
- Stephan Junca – drums, percussion

Additional musicians

- Mark Hanley – keyboards, vocals, bass
- Jim Hill – treatments and manipulations, vocals, synthesizer, tambourine
- Meena Makhijani – tablas (2, 10)
- Mac Hill – synthesizer (9)
- Aryeh Frankfurter – strings (10, 11)
- Debbi Peterson – background vocals (1, 6)
- Vicki Peterson – background vocals (1, 6)
- Greg Moore – background vocals (1, 4, 8)
- Thom Moore – background vocals (1, 4, 8)
- Darian Sahanaja – background vocals, background vocal arrangements (3, 9, 11)
- Rob Bonfiglio – background vocals (9, 11)
- Marcus Blake – background vocals (11)

Technical

- Jim Hill – producer, engineer
- Gabriel Shepard – assistant engineer
- Wally Sound – assistant engineer
- Varun Kejriwal – assistant engineer
- Chris Bellman – mastering
- Stefanie Beltran – art direction
- Jon Krop – packaging layout
- Emily Wick – cover photography
