= Io sì (Seen) =

Single by Laura Pausini
- Released: 23 October 2020
- Genre: Pop
- Length: 3:54
- Label: Warner Music; Atlantic
- Songwriters: Diane Warren; Laura Pausini; Niccolò Agliardi
- Producer: Greg Wells

Laura Pausini singles chronology
"Verdades a medias" (2020)	"Io sì (Seen)" (2020)	"Scatola/Caja" (2022)

Music video
- "Io sì (Seen)" on YouTube

"Io sì (Seen)" (pronounced [ˈiːo ˈsi], "I Yes") is a song written by Diane Warren, Laura Pausini and Niccolò Agliardi, and recorded by Pausini for the soundtrack of the 2020 film The Life Ahead. The song was produced by Greg Wells and released as a digital single on 23 October 2020. On 30 October 2020, the song was released for airplay to Italian mainstream radios.

"Io sì (Seen)" won the awards for Song of the Year at the Capri Hollywood International Film Festival, Best International Song at the CinEuphoria Awards, Master in Music Award at the Los Angeles Italia Film Festival, Outstanding Song – Feature Film at the 11th Hollywood Music in Media Awards, Best Original Song at the 25th Satellite Awards and the award with the same name at the 78th Golden Globe Awards (the first non-English song to win the award and Pausini the first Italian singer ever to win the prize). The song won the award for best original song at the 75th Nastro d’Argento Awards. It also received nominations for Best Original Song at the 93rd Academy Awards, making it the first song sung entirely in Italian to be nominated, and for Best Song at the 26th Critics' Choice Awards.

== Background and composition ==
"Io sì (Seen)" is a power ballad. Diane Warren wrote the original version of the song, with English-language lyrics, specifically for the film The Life Ahead, and involved Pausini in the project during the summer of 2020. After watching the film, Pausini accepted to perform the song, identifying herself in its message about diversity and against prejudice, racism, also talks about the hard life of orphaned or poor children, people struggling to have or adopt children, to people who are invisible and need to be seen and especially to the difficult situation that the world lives in these times. Pausini translated the song in Italian with her frequent collaborator Niccolò Agliardi. Despite being used to compose instinctively, Pausini and Agliardi worked on the lyrics adaptation for 25 days, since she wanted to be sure to respect the film's meaning.

The song was produced, mixed, with most instruments played by Greg Wells, and recorded in Romagna in Pausini's home studio built in her parents' house. The film only features the Italian-language version of the song, but it was also recorded by Pausini in English, Spanish, French and Portuguese. The strings were arranged by David Campbell and recorded in Prague with the FILMHarmonic Orchestra.

== Music video ==
The music video for the song was released on 30 October 2020. It was directed by Edoardo Ponti, and features a cameo appearance by Sophia Loren, leading actress in the film The Life Ahead, also directed by Ponti and featuring "Io sì (Seen)" as its theme song. Reiterating the film's message, the video shows several women close-ups, with the purpose to represent their individual uniqueness, intensity and truthfulness. In November 2020, Pausini released a backstage video, with scenes taken while shooting the song's official music video.

== Accolades ==
Year	Ceremony	Category	Recipients	Result	Ref.
2020	25th Capri Hollywood International Film Festival	Song of the Year	Diane Warren, Laura Pausini and Niccolò Agliardi	Won	
2021	78th Golden Globe Awards	Best Original Song	Diane Warren, Laura Pausini and Niccolò Agliardi	Won	
2021	75th Nastro d’Argento Awards	Best Original Song	Diane Warren, Laura Pausini and Niccolò Agliardi	Won	
2021	25th Satellite Awards	Best Original Song	Diane Warren, Laura Pausini and Niccolò Agliardi	Won	
2021	11th Hollywood Music in Media Awards	Outstanding Song – Feature Film	Diane Warren, Laura Pausini and Niccolò Agliardi	Won	
2021	16th Los Angeles Italia Film Festival	Master in Music Award	Diane Warren, Laura Pausini and Niccolò Agliardi	Won	
2021	12th CinEuphoria Awards	Best International Song	Diane Warren, Laura Pausini and Niccolò Agliardi	Won	
2021	93rd Academy Awards	Best Original Song	Diane Warren, Laura Pausini and Niccolò Agliardi	Nominated	
2021	26th Critics' Choice Awards	Best Song	Diane Warren, Laura Pausini and Niccolò Agliardi	Nominated	
2021	66th David di Donatello Awards	Best Original Song	Diane Warren, Laura Pausini and Niccolò Agliardi	Nominated	
2021	14th Houston Film Critics Society Awards	Best Original Song	Diane Warren, Laura Pausini and Niccolò Agliardi	Nominated	
2021	10th Georgia Film Critics Association Awards	Best Original Song	Diane Warren, Laura Pausini and Niccolò Agliardi	Nominated	
2021	19th Gold Derby Awards	Best Original Song	Diane Warren, Laura Pausini and Niccolò Agliardi	Nominated	
2021	5th Hawaii Film Critics Society Awards	Best Song	Diane Warren, Laura Pausini and Niccolò Agliardi	Nominated	
2021	3rd Latino Entertainment Journalists Association Film Awards	Best Song	Diane Warren, Laura Pausini and Niccolò Agliardi	Nominated	

== Live performances ==
Pausini performed the song live at the International Peace Honors on 17 January 2021 and at the virtual ceremony of the 11th Hollywood Music in Media Awards, held on 27 January 2021. Moreover, on 3 March 2021, following the victory of the song at the 78th Golden Globe Awards for Best Original Song, Pausini was invited as a guest at the second night of the 71st Sanremo Music Festival, where she sang "Io sì (Seen)" with the Sanremo Festival Orchestra. On 25 April she sang the song at the 93rd Academy Awards from the rooftop of the Academy Museum of Motion Pictures in Los Angeles with accompaniment by Diane Warren during the pre-show of the ceremony and eventually she performed it opening the 66th David di Donatello Awards inside the Teatro dell'Opera di Roma.

== Track listing ==
Digital Extended Play – Original tracklist
No.	Title	Length
1.	"Io sì (Seen)"	3:54
2.	"Seen (Io sì)"	3:54
3.	"Yo si (Io sì)"	3:54
4.	"Moi si (Io sì)"	3:54
5.	"Eu sim (Io sì)"	3:54

Digital Extended Play – Bonus Version (1 February 2021); Limited Numbered Vinyl Edition (2 April 2021)
No.	Title	Length
1.	"Io sì (Seen)"	3:54
2.	"Seen (Io sì)"	3:54
3.	"Io sì (Seen)" (Italian-English version)	3:54
4.	"Yo si (Io sì)"	3:54
5.	"Moi si (Io sì)"	3:54
6.	"Eu sim (Io sì)"	3:54

Digital Extended Play – Remix (26 April 2021)
No.	Title	Length
1.	"Io sì (Seen)" (Dave Audé Remix)	3:30
2.	"Seen (Io sì)" (Dave Audé Remix)	3:30
3.	"Io sì (Seen)" (Dave Audé Remix; Italian-English version)	3:30
4.	"Yo si (Io sì)" (Dave Audé Remix)	3:30
5.	"Moi si (Io sì)" (Dave Audé Remix)	3:30
6.	"Eu sim (Io sì)" (Dave Audé Remix)	3:30

== Charts ==
Chart (2020–21)	Peak position
Italy (FIMI)	71
Mexico Espanol Airplay (Billboard)	26
US AC (American Radio Chart)	19
US Adult Contemporary (Billboard)	19
US Latin Digital Song Sales (Billboard)	6
US World Digital Song Sales (Billboard)	4

== Certifications ==
Region	Certification	Certified units/sales
Italy (FIMI)	Gold	50,000^{‡}
^{‡} Sales+streaming figures based on certification alone.

== Personnel ==
Production and music credits

- Diane Warren − composer, lyricist
- Laura Pausini − performer, lyricist
- Niccolò Agliardi − lyricist
- Greg Wells − producer, mixer, engineer, keyboards, drums, percussion, guitar
- Paolo Carta − vocal producer, vocal recordings, mixer, mastering
- Bonnie Greensberg − executive Producer
- Kyle Townsend − additional production
- Christy Gerhart − production coordinator for recording
- Strings FILMharmonic Orchestra, Prague − orchestra
- Richard Hein − orchestra conductor
- Jan Holzner − sound engineer
- Michael Hradiský − assistant engineer
- Petr Pýcha − orchestra contractor, recording manager
- Gary Chester − session coordinator
- David Richard Campbell − strings arranger
- Brandon Williams − ProTool preparation and editing
- Rita Chepurchenko − solo violin
- Petr Malýšek − solo violoncello
