= Grateful (Rita Ora song) =

Song by Rita Ora

from the album Beyond the Lights
- Released: 11 November 2014
- Recorded: 2014
- Length: 4:04
- Label: Relativity Music Group
- Songwriter: Diane Warren
- Producer: The Arcade

"Grateful" is a song performed by British singer Rita Ora, taken from the Beyond the Lights soundtrack. It was written by Diane Warren.

Billboard premiered the song's audio on 22 October 2014, from Relativity Music Group's official SoundCloud. The song was released on 11 November 2014 on iTunes as a part of Beyond the Lights soundtrack. Ora performed "Grateful" at the 87th Academy Awards on 22 February 2015.

== Awards and nominations ==
Year	Award	Category	Nominee(s)	Result	Ref.
2015	87th Academy Awards	Best Original Song	Diane Warren	Nominated	
2015	15th World Soundtrack Awards	Best Original Song Written Directly for a Film	Diane Warren	Nominated	
2015	15th Black Reel Awards	Best Original or Adapted Song	Diane Warren (performed by Rita Ora)	Nominated	
