= Pat Thomas (American musician) =

American musician

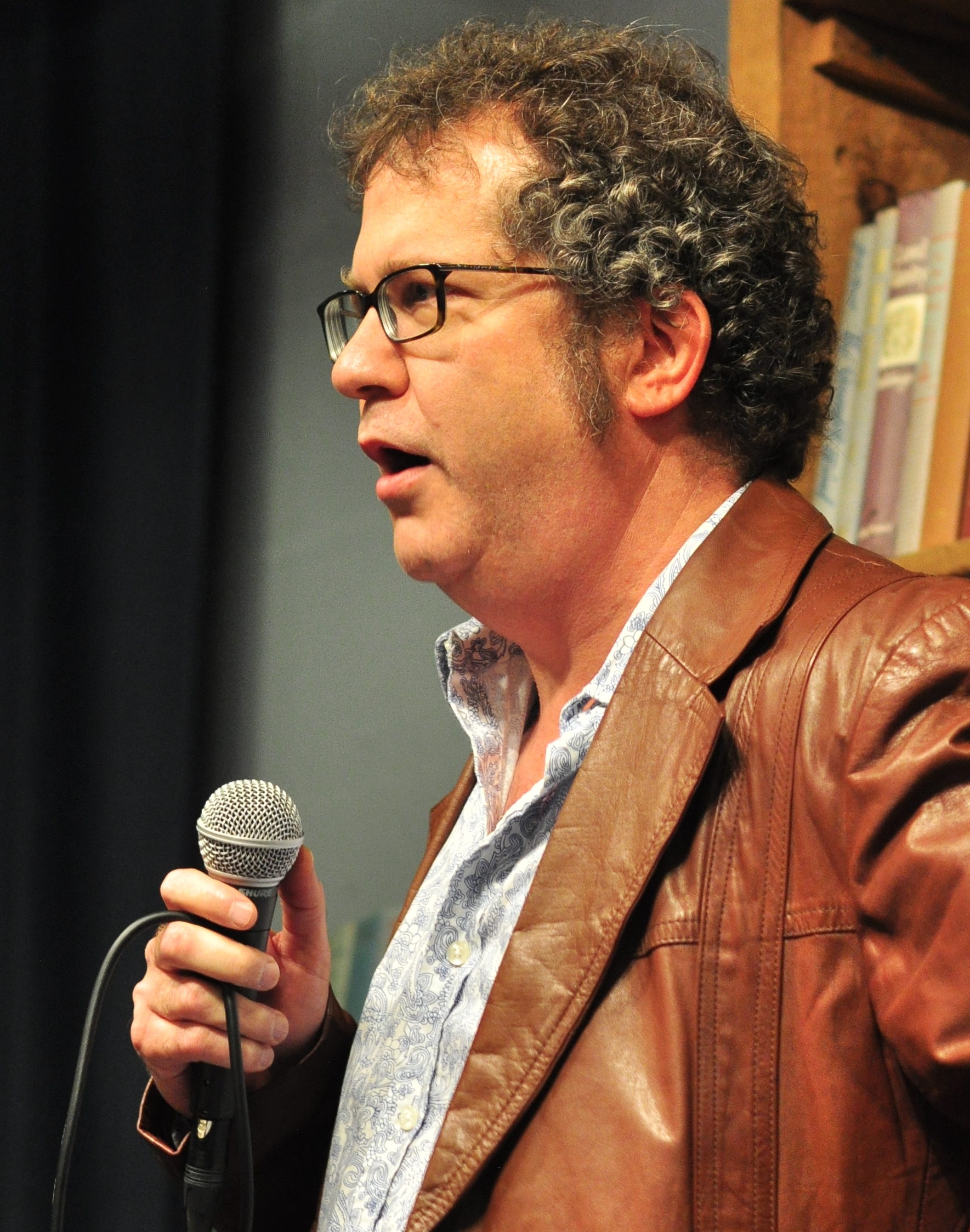
- Pat Thomas in 2017 at Elliott Bay Books in Seattle

Background information
- Also known as: Patrick O'Hearn
- Born: Patrick O'Hearn Thomas; April 6, 1964 (age 61)
- Genres: rock; alternative; experimental psychedelic; folk rock
- Occupations: musician; reissue producer; writer
- Instrument: Drums
- Years active: 1980s-present
- Labels: Heyday, Water, Omnivore, Innerstate

Pat Thomas is a San Francisco-based musician, music journalist and compiler of music reissues.

== Compilation ==
Thomas was the founder in 1988 of Heyday Records. He later moved on to Water Records, and currently compiles reissues at Omnivore Recordings.

Heyday Records leveraged the commercial success of Paisley Underground bands as a springboard for new artists who captured the flavor of the 1960s American and British folk scene, particularly local San Francisco artists such as Barbara Manning. Thomas also made pilgrimages to England, tracking down musical artists of the 1960s such as the Incredible String Band, Pentangle, Fairport Convention, Shirley Collins, Davey Graham, and Wizz Jones, before most had any of their music reissued on CD. While living in Germany for two years in the early 1990s, Thomas also promoted artists for Heyday and other labels.

His credits as a compiler of reissue recordings also include albums by Aretha Franklin, Dusty Springfield, Television, and for Omnivore, artists such as Game Theory.

== Writing ==
Thomas is the author of the book Listen, Whitey: The Sights and Sounds of Black Power, a 2012 work of African-American cultural history centering on the Black Panther Party, with a concurrently released CD and double LP recording of speeches and protest songs. He is also the author of books on Jerry Rubin and Allen Ginsberg.

He is also known for his work as a music critic. He has written for Bucketfull of Brains, The Bob, Juxtapoz, Crawdaddy and Mojo and was editor of the last issue of Ptolemaic Terrascope.

== Music ==
As a musician, Thomas has been drummer and percussionist for bands such as Absolute Grey, and presently for the musicians' collective Mushroom, which he founded.

From 1987 to 1997, Thomas released five solo records. He has also recorded as Patrick O'Hearn.

Thomas founded Mushroom in the San Francisco Bay Area, in November 1996. The group's sound has been described as a "diverse and eclectic blend of jazz, space rock, R&B, electronic, ambient, Krautrock and folk music".

Mushroom released its first recording in 1997, a 12" single called "The Reeperbahn," described by critic Fred Mills in Magnet as a recording that "could fool a blindfolded test applicant into thinking its 25-minute psych blowout was some long lost Krautrock epic from the early '70s. Let the band's wah-wah guitar, feedback violin, volcanic bass, jazzbo percussion, and tape loops take you down the fabled motorway, never to return to the place you once knew." "The Reeperbahn" provided the basis for CDs released in 1998 in the Netherlands and Germany.

In 1999, the band released Analog Hi-Fi Surprise in the United States and Germany, followed by a European tour, by which time keyboard player Graham Connah had exited and was replaced by Michael Holt. Toronto music magazine Exclaim! wrote that the band "dish out the tastiest psychedelic funk you're ever likely to encounter. The groove's the thang as these tasty tracks cruise on Rhodes-driven jazz, ambient beats, surf riffs, and post rock textures. The band brew all these elements into a mixture that travels the outer realms of progressive funk. Like Tortoise jamming with the Grateful Dead or Soft Machine exploring the Funkadelic catalog, these loose open-ended excursions raise the art of fusion to a new plateau. While each track works a groove toward heady epiphany, the album as a whole refuses to stay locked into any one genre. Booker T-styled organ gyrations, rock guitar virtuosity, Bootsy Collins funk ups, ambient jazz, electronic beats, and Krautrock trance all make a stand, but the bottom line is that this is music that will move you, and then some."

The band then recorded Foxy Music (2001), which included trumpeter Jon Birdsong (known for his work with Beck). Q magazine in England wrote, "On the Foxy Music CD, the band steer away from determined psychedelia in favor of a friendly looseness to their playing. Jabs of electro-trombone and flute cluster alongside churning organ and splintered Rhodes Piano. Beck's trumpeter Jon Birdsong also turns on a great big blubbery blast of tuba, while musical director Patrick O'Hearn's clattering drums have an automaton rotary action that sometimes recalls Can's Jaki Liebezeit."

As of 2015, the members of Mushroom were Thomas (congas, bongos, drum kit), Ned Doherty (bass), Erik Pearson (flute, violin, effects, acoustic and electric guitar, electric sitar), Dave Brandt (congas, bongos, vibes, djembe, gongs), Josh Pollock (acoustic guitar, vocals, megaphone electronics), Alison Levy (vocals), Ralph Carney (woodwinds/horns), Graham Connah (keyboards), Matt Cunitz (keyboards), Tim Plowman (guitar), Dan Olmsted (guitar), and Dave Mihaly (vibes, percussion). Mushroom's current label is 4 Zero Records.

== Discography ==
Solo

- Too Close to the Ground (Didi Music)
- It's a Long, Long Way to Omaha, Nebraska (1989, Heyday Records)
- St. Katharine (1994, What's So Funny About)
- Fresh (1995, Strange Ways)
- New Directions in Music By Pat Thomas: Valium (1997, Strange Ways)

=== With Mushroom ===
==== Albums ====
- Cream of Mushroom (1998, Normal)
- Alive and in Full Bloom (1998, Inbetweens)
- Analog Hi-Fi Surprise (1999, Clearspot; 2002, Weed)
- Hydrogen Jukebox (1999, Timothy's Brain)
- Compared to What (2000, Weed) – with Bundy K. Brown, Faust, Gary Floyd
- Leni Riefenstahl (2000, Aether)
- Foxy Music (2001, InnerSPACE)
- Oh, But They're Weird and They're Wonderful (2002, Return to Sender)
- Mad Dogs & San Franciscans (2003, Black Beauty; 2012, A Records)
- Glazed Popems (2004, Black Beauty)
- Really Don't Mind If You Sit This One Out (2006, 4 Zero)
- Joint Happening (2007, Hyena)
- Yesterday, I Saw You Kissing Tiny Flowers (2007, 4 Zero) – with Alison Faith Levy
- Naked, Stoned & Stabbed (2010, 4 Zero)
- I Don't Remember Yesterday. Today It Rained (2011, 4 Zero)

==== Singles and EPs ====
- "The Reeperbahn" (12" single) (1997, Belmondo)
- "Gas, Grass Or Ass - Nobody Rides For Free" (CDr single) (2007, 4 Zero)

== Bibliography ==
- Listen, Whitey! The Sights & Sounds of Black Power 1965–1975 (2012) Seattle, WA: Fantagraphics ISBN 9781606995075
- Did It! Jerry Rubin: An American Revolutionary (2017) Seattle, WA: Fantagraphics ISBN 9781606998922
- Material Wealth: Mining the Personal Archive of Allen Ginsberg (2023) New York: powerHouse Books ISBN 9781648230363
