= Beyond the Lights =

2014 film

- Theatrical release poster
- Directed by: Gina Prince-Bythewood
- Written by: Gina Prince-Bythewood
- Produced by: Stephanie Allain; Reggie Rock Bythewood; Ryan Kavanaugh; Amar'e Stoudemire; Sharon Tomlinson
- Starring: Gugu Mbatha-Raw; Nate Parker; Minnie Driver; Colson Baker; Danny Glover
- Cinematography: Tami Reiker
- Edited by: Terilyn A. Shropshire
- Music by: Mark Isham
- Production companies: Homegrown Pictures; Undisputed Cinema
- Distributed by: Relativity Media
- Release dates: September 6, 2014 (TIFF); November 14, 2014 (United States)
- Running time: 116 minutes
- Country: United States
- Language: English
- Budget: $7 million
- Box office: $14.6 million

Beyond the Lights is a 2014 American romantic drama film written and directed by Gina Prince-Bythewood. The film stars Gugu Mbatha-Raw, Nate Parker, Minnie Driver, Machine Gun Kelly, and Danny Glover. The film premiered at the 2014 Toronto International Film Festival on September 7, 2014, and was released theatrically in the United States on November 14, 2014. In 2015, the song "Grateful" was nominated for the Academy Award for Best Original Song.

== Plot ==
In 1998 in London, aspiring singer Noni Jean is taken by her mother Macy to a salon to get her hair done before her performance at a talent contest. Noni is happy to win second place for her performance of Nina Simone's "Blackbird", but her mother refuses to accept anything but first place and forces Noni to smash her trophy on the ground.

In the present, an adult Noni is a hot new artist who has just won a Billboard Music Award for her collaboration with her boyfriend Kid Culprit and is primed for superstardom. However, the pressures of success cause her to nearly end her life by falling off a hotel balcony. She is saved by a young police officer, Kaz Nicol. Noni's team, including her mother, tells the media in a press conference that she fell by accident. Kaz, who has political ambitions, is not happy to be forced to lie to the media, and is initially cold to Noni. However, he later apologizes to her. Gradually, they connect and begin to fall in love, despite her mother's disapproval. Noni tells Kaz about the songs she has secretly written, and he is supportive of her creative ambitions. Noni decides to end the romantic relationship with Kid Culprit that her team has encouraged.

In spite of her team's attempt to cover it up, rumors persist that Noni attempted suicide, and her label tells Macy (who is also Noni's manager) that her record contract is conditional on a successful upcoming performance. However, during the performance, Kid Culprit sexually assaults and humiliates her, claiming that Noni attempted suicide because he'd broken up with her. He tries to strip Noni's clothes off on stage when Kaz rushes in to rescue her and punches Kid Culprit in her defense. Following this, Noni loses her record contract and is at a low point emotionally, so Kaz takes her on a trip to Mexico away from the spotlight where they enjoy each other's company. Noni gets rid of her old hairstyle in favor of her natural hair, and a trip to a local karaoke bar leads to Noni giving an emotional performance of "Blackbird." The performance is uploaded to the internet and goes viral, causing Noni's mother and the paparazzi to find her. Macy tells Noni that the viral success of her performance has caused her record label to reconsider, and Noni agrees to return home. Kaz tells Noni he is not convinced that anything will be different than it was before, and their relationship is put on pause.

Noni wants to add a song she has written to her upcoming album, but Macy refuses. The two fight about their relationship and Noni tells her mother that even after her suicide attempt, Macy continued to focus only on her career to the detriment of her happiness and mental health, and Noni ultimately fires Macy as her manager. Meanwhile, Kaz has begun a political campaign and reflects on whether his career should take precedence over his personal happiness. Inspired by Kaz's honesty, Noni gives a television interview where she admits to having attempted suicide and says she is getting help. Noni prepares for her first live performance in London, and shortly before going onstage suddenly encounters Kaz, who has taken a flight there (despite his fear of flying) and expresses his love for her. Noni performs a song she has written to an enthusiastic audience. She brings Kaz onstage, tells him that she loves him too, and they embrace.

== Cast ==
- Gugu Mbatha-Raw as Noni Jean
  - India Jean-Jacques as Noni (aged 10)
- Nate Parker as Kaz Nicol
- Minnie Driver as Macy Jean
- Colson "MGK" Baker as Kid Culprit
- Danny Glover as Captain David Nicol
- Aml Ameen as Trey
- Benito Martinez as Jesse Soria
- Aisha Hinds as J Stanley
- Jordan Belfi as Steve Sams
- Hayley Marie Norman as Shai
- Tom Wright as Reverend Brown
- Jesse Woodrow as Carl
- Jasmine Vargas as the waitress in the night club
- Estelle as herself

== Production ==
On August 15, 2013, Relativity Media bought the worldwide rights to the film, originally titled Blackbird. Relativity Media also financed and distributed the film. Ryan Kavanaugh produced along with Stephanie Allain. On December 6, 2013, Relativity set the film for a November 14, 2014 release date.

=== Casting ===
Three stars—Gugu Mbatha-Raw, Nate Parker, and Danny Glover—were already in the ensemble cast on August 15; Raw played Noni Jean, a new singer. Parker played Kaz Nicol and Glover played Captain David Nicol. On September 25, 2013, Minnie Driver and Machine Gun Kelly also joined the cast; Driver played Noni's mother Macy Jean while Machine Gun Kelly played Kid Culprit, a rapper.

=== Filming ===
Principal photography commenced on August 21, 2013, in Los Angeles.

== Soundtrack ==
Relativity Music Group released a soundtrack album for the film on November 10, 2014, which features the original song "Grateful", written by Diane Warren and performed by Rita Ora. Three songs featured in the film but absent from the soundtrack are Beyoncé's "Drunk in Love," India.Arie's "I Am Light" and Amel Larrieux's "Don't Let Me Down".

== Reception ==
=== Critical response ===
On Rotten Tomatoes, the film holds an approval rating of 83% based on 93 reviews, with an average rating of 6.70/10. The website's critical consensus reads: "Thanks to smart direction and a powerhouse performance from Gugu Mbatha-Raw, Beyond the Lights transcends its formulaic storyline to deliver thoroughly entertaining drama." On Metacritic, the film has a weighted average score of 73 out of 100, based on 25 critics, indicating "generally favorable" reviews. Audiences polled by CinemaScore gave the film an average grade of "A" on an A+ to F scale.

The Hollywood Reporter praised Mbatha-Raw's performance as "incandescent" and Prince-Bythewood's script for its "surprising integrity." Hitfix said the film's excellence showed that writer/director "Gina Prince-Bythewood isn't working enough," while Variety called it "messy but undeniably entertaining."

=== Accolades ===
Awards
Year	Award	Category	Recipient	Result
2014	Gotham Awards	Best Actress	Gugu Mbatha-Raw	Nominated
2014	Capri, Hollywood	Rising Star	Gugu Mbatha-Raw	Won
2015	NAACP Image Awards	Outstanding Motion Picture		Nominated
2015	NAACP Image Awards	Outstanding Actor	Nate Parker	Nominated
2015	NAACP Image Awards	Outstanding Supporting Actor	Danny Glover	Nominated
2015	NAACP Image Awards	Outstanding Directoring	Gina Prince-Bythewood	Nominated
2015	Black Reel Awards	Best Film	Beyond the Lights	Nominated
2015	Black Reel Awards	Best Director	Gina Prince-Bythewood	Nominated
2015	Black Reel Awards	Best Actor	Nate Parker	Nominated
2015	Black Reel Awards	Best Actress	Gugu Mbatha-Raw	Nominated
2015	Black Reel Awards	Best Screenplay, Adapted or Original	Gina Prince-Bythewood	Nominated
2015	Black Reel Awards	Best Original or Adapted Song	Diane Warren "Grateful"	Nominated
2015	Black Reel Awards	Outstanding Original Score	Mark Isham	Nominated
2015	Academy Awards	Best Original Song	Diane Warren "Grateful"	Nominated

== See also ==
- List of black films of the 2010s
