= Education Through Music-Los Angeles =

Education Through Music - Los Angeles
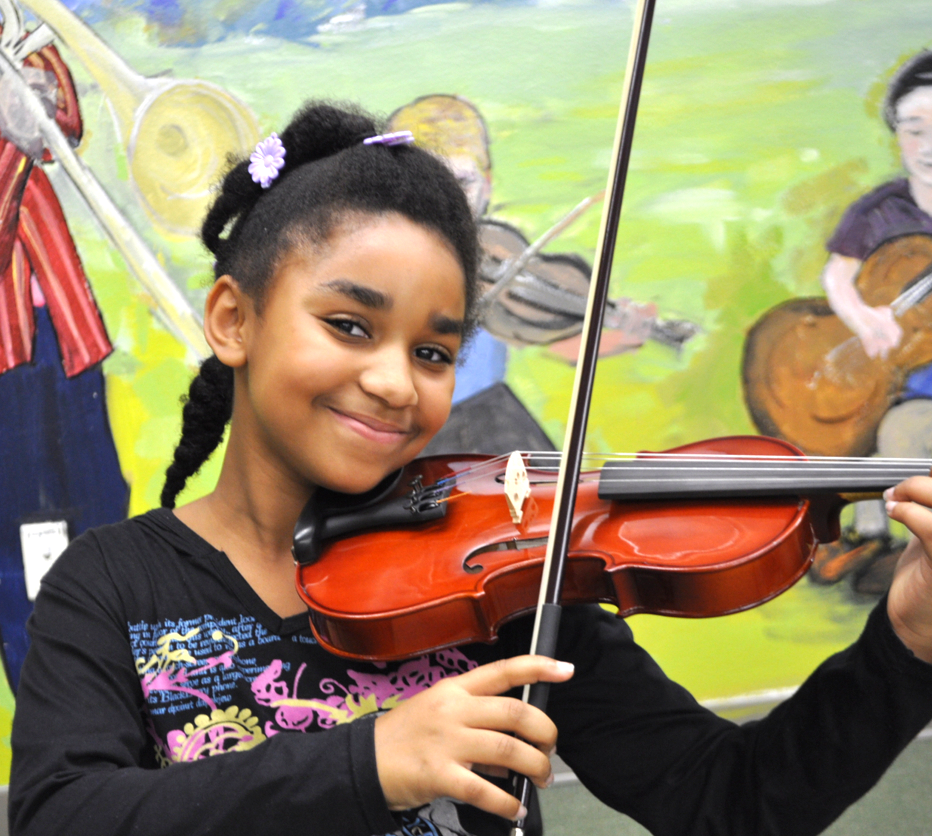
- An Education Through Music-Los Angeles student posing with her violin
- Abbreviation: ETM-LA
- Formation: 2006; 20 years ago
- Type: Nonprofit
- Legal status: 501(c)(3) organization
- Purpose: Provide and promote music education into the curricula of schools of low-income students in Los Angeles
- Headquarters: Burbank, California
- Location: Los Angeles, United States
- Executive Director: Victoria Lanier
- Affiliations: Education Through Music (NY)

Education Through Music - Los Angeles is an independent 501(c)(3) organization founded in 2006 in Los Angeles in the United States. The group aims to provide and promote music education as a core subject in under-resourced schools in the Los Angeles and surrounding areas, in order to enhance students' academic performance and overall development.

The group works with inner-city elementary schools that are unable to develop or sustain school-wide music programs independently. ETM-LA provides under-resourced Los Angeles youth with weekly, yearlong music classes at no cost to the school. The goal is to combine music with all other academic subjects in order to reinforce learning and development in all areas, as well as encourage the school to embrace music as a core subject by involving all members of the school community. Currently, ETM-LA reaches over 18,000 Los Angeles school children across 41 schools and five school districts, including students with special needs. Students are provided with weekly, yearlong music instruction in disciplines such as choir, band, orchestra, Orff, modern band, and general music.

ETM-LA headquarters are located in Burbank, California and since its creation has been led by Executive Director Victoria Lanier. Education Through Music-Los Angeles is an affiliate music education program based on the "Education Through Music" (ETM) model, used since 1991 in New York City.

== Shining Star Award ==
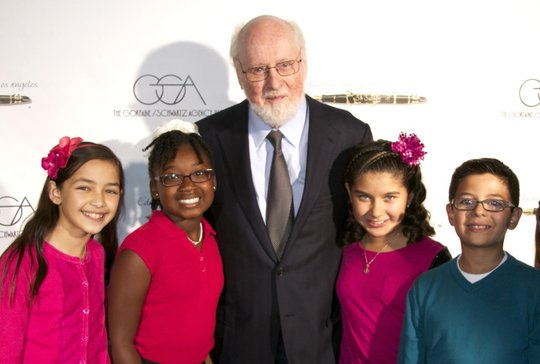
John Williams with ETM-LA students at the 7th annual Benefit Gala

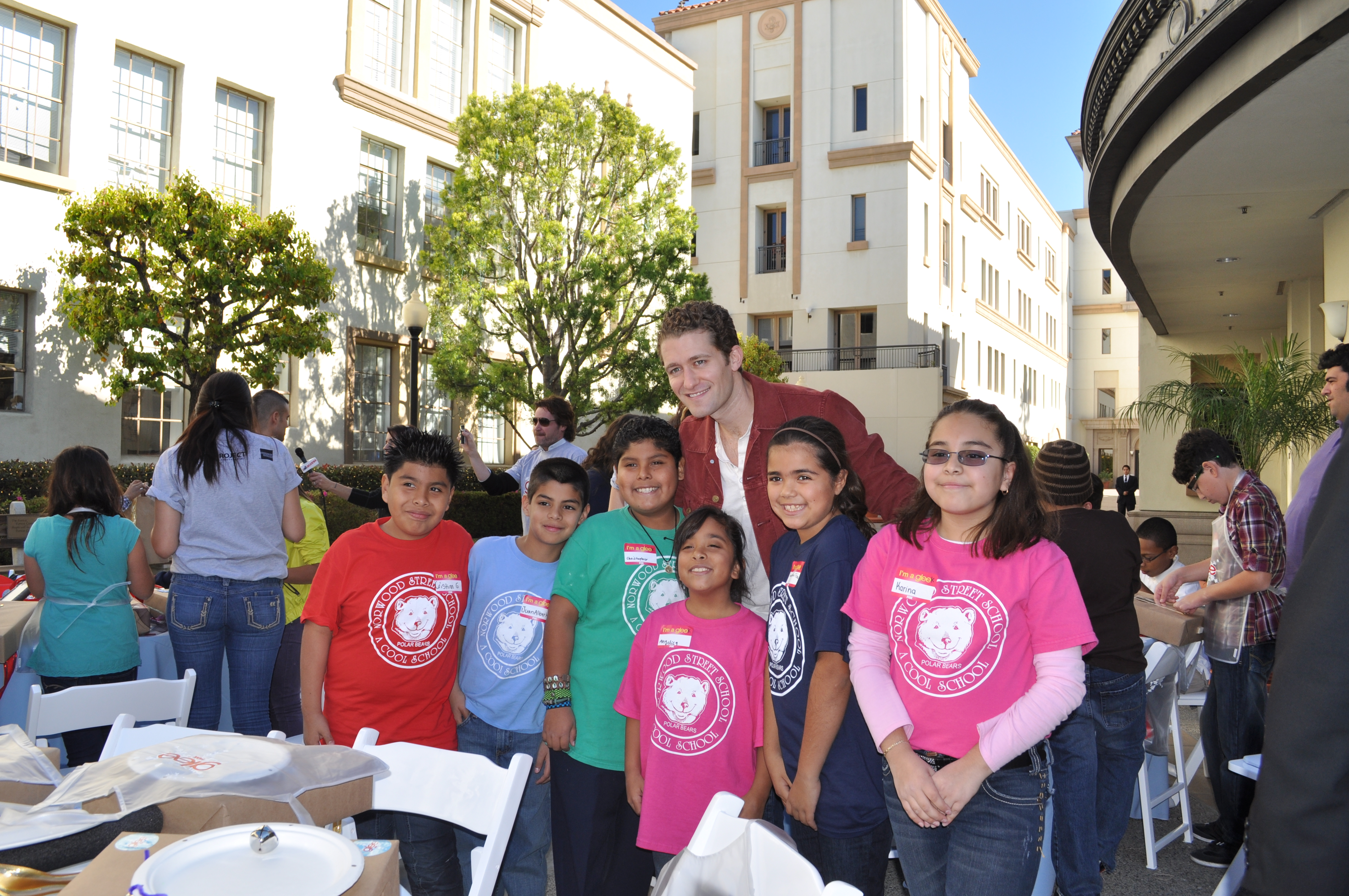
Matthew Morrison from Glee with ETM-LA students at Fox Glee's American Express Members Project event

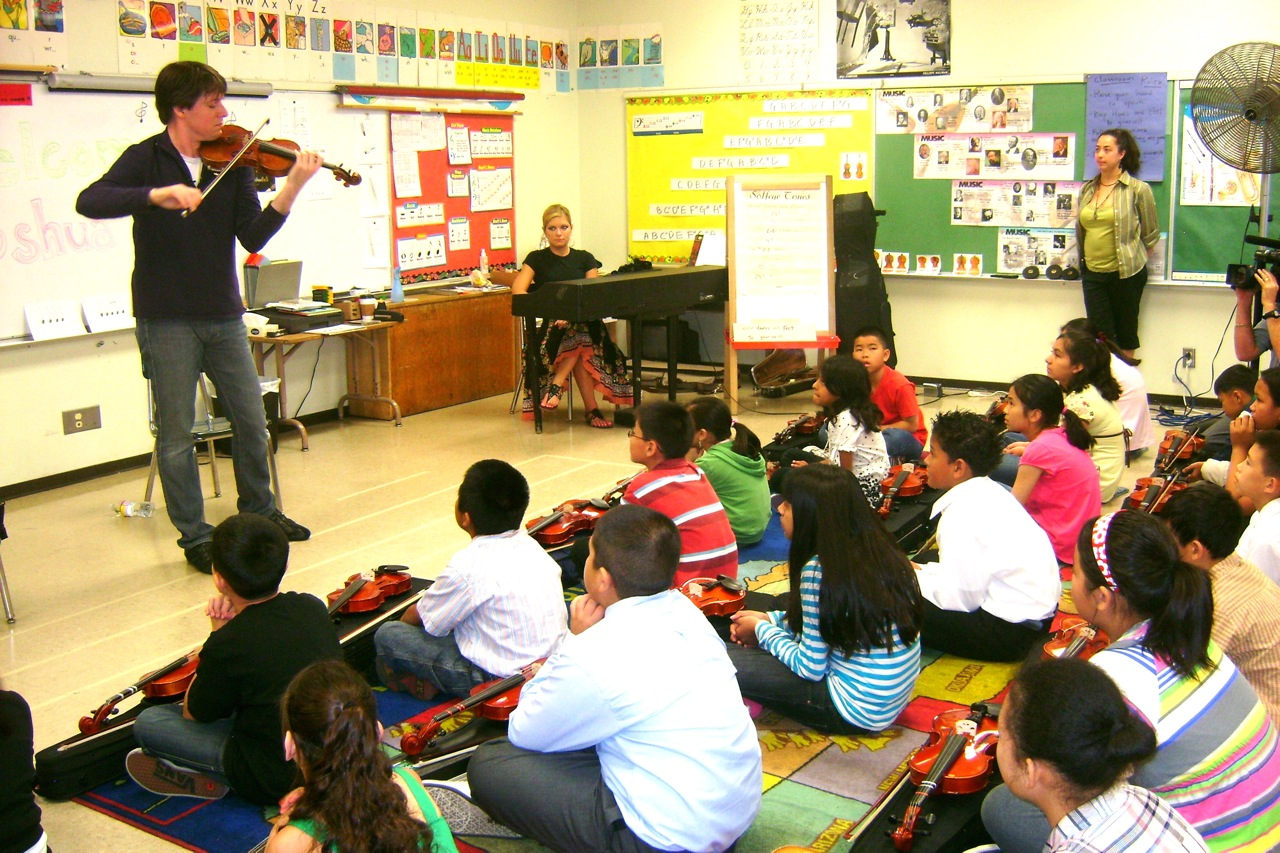
ETM-LA students watch as Joshua Bell performs

ETM-LA issues a "Shining Star" award for excellence in music education. Honorees include: Diane Warren, John Williams, Michael Giacchino, Joshua Bell, Ed Helms, Richard Meyer, Randy Spendlove, Asuncion Ojeda, and music educators Zanaida Robles, Vincent Womack, and Linda Mouradian.

== Partnerships ==
Since its establishment in 2006, ETM-LA has formed several partnerships with various organizations and individuals. In 2007, ETM-LA became an arts provider for the LAUSD Arts Community Partnership Network and the LA County Arts for All program. In December 2010, ETM-LA students participated and performed in an unprecedented event with Fox Glee's American Express project. ETM-LA has also partnered with Neutrogena and Global Giving. In June 2013, ETM-LA partnered with Women in Film to create their first Public Service Announcement.

ETM-LA has worked to connect artists to their students. Some of these artists include Ed Helms, Michael Giacchino, Joe Kraemer, and Joshua Bell.

== Benefit events ==
Celebrities who have performed for Education Through Music-LA’s benefit events include:

- Johnny Mathis
- Patti Austin
- Ben Vereen
- Justin Guarini
- Gordon Goodwin's Big Phat Band
- Lalah Hathaway
- Patrice Rushen
- Kate Flannery
- The Lampshades
- Nicola Benedetti
- Ray Ushikubo
- Kristen Bell

== Expenses ==
Expenses from 2011-2012

Direct Program Costs	415,821	83%
Fundraising Expenses	49,414	10%
Management & General Expenses	34,790	7%
