= Bass Is Maternal =

Studio album by Smith & Mighty
- Released: 25 October 1995
- Recorded: 1989
- Genre: Trip hop; drum and bass; dub
- Length: 63:24
- Label: More Rockers
- Producer: Smith & Mighty

Smith & Mighty chronology
Bass Is Maternal (1995)	DJ-Kicks: Smith & Mighty (1998)

Bass Is Maternal is the debut studio album by Bristolian production duo Smith & Mighty, released by More Rockers in 1995. The album was recorded in 1989 for ffrr/London Records, who had signed the duo after they had built up underground success in their native city for their innovative Bristol underground scene sound, but the labels deemed the record unsuitable for release. The record explores links between dub music and British rave culture, incorporating styles of rock, reggae and electronic music with an emphasis on dub-style bass. The album title and artwork highlight the perceived association between the exposure of bass and maternity.

Upon its release, Bass Is Maternal was largely commercially unsuccessful, although it peaked at number 35 on the UK R&B Albums Chart. It received mixed and positive commentary from critics, who described the record as a long-awaited release. It has since been regarded as a groundbreaking album that anticipated 1990s progressions in drum and bass, jungle, trip hop and Bristolian music. In 2000, the album was re-released on Studio !K7. In the January 2001 issue of Spin, it was listed among the "Top 10 Reissues of the Year". In 2015, Fact placed the album at number 42 on the "50 Best Trip-Hop Albums of All Time" list, and cited it as "an important chapter in British musical history."

== Background and production ==
Smith & Mighty, consisting of Rob Smith and Ray Mighty, formed in Bristol in the 1987. They became innovators of the Bristol sound, with initial endeavours including cutting up samples of pianist Erik Satie and applying them to hip hop-reggae rhythms, and recording with Pop Group member Mark Stewart on "Stranger Than Love". Alongside producing fellow Bristolian act Massive Attack's debut single "Any Love" and Fresh 4's sole hit "Wishing on a Star", Smith & Mighty released off-kilter covers of the Burt Bacharach and Hal David songs "Walk on By" and "Anyone Who Had a Heart." These covers were ragga jungle recordings that highlighted the duo's interest in introducing pop song forms to experimental dance music.

The singles turned Smith & Mighty into popular underground figures, and attracted the interest of ffrr/London Records, who signed the duo believing them to be a production team with a crossover style similar to Soul II Soul. Although the duo recorded Bass Is Maternal in 1989, the label did not want to release the album, deeming it unsuitable for release. The duo thus found themselves in "music industry purgatory," unwilling to alter their style to fit ffrr/London's wishes, but contractually prevented from releasing the album elsewhere. While the record remained unreleased, the duo began working with other artists such as The Ragga Twins, Neneh Cherry and Beats International in the early 1990s, and only the 1992 proto-jungle EP Stepper's Delight and singer Carlton's 1990 album The Call Is Strong featured the duo's production skills during the era. The duo were finally freed from their contract with ffrr/London in 1994, and released a reworked version of Bass Is Maternal on Smith's recently-launched drum and bass label More Rockers in 1995. Smith later recalled:

"The stuff we ended up recording for [ffrr/London] was a bit watered-down. A bit compromised. So when we got out of the deal, we said, 'Fuck it! Let's go back underground a bit, slap our kind of thing together and have fun with it.' So if Bass Is Maternal had come out five years earlier, it wouldn't have been the same album. By the time we did it, we did it for us."

== Composition ==
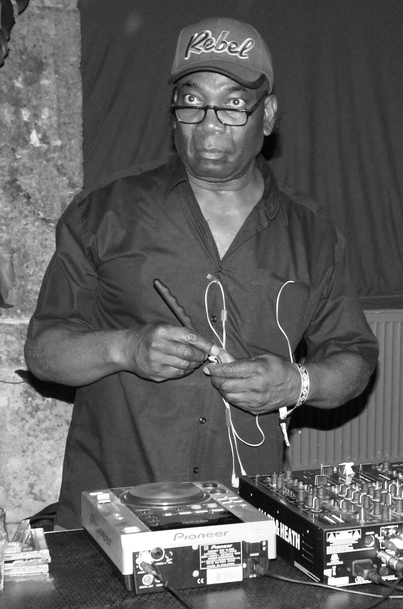
The album's usage of bass was compared to dub producers like Dennis Bovell (pictured).

Bass Is Maternal is a trip hop album that explores the link between British rave culture and Jamaican dub music. The duo took an experimental approach, mixing dub, hip hop, reggae, rock and electronic music into numerous hybrids largely of a dance music nature. The record prominently incorporates dense jungle music, applying the genre's sped up breakbeats to dub music and shoegaze, and also fuses ambient music, electropop and usage of space synths, although characteristic of the album throughout is the heavy usage of seismic bass. The duo felt that the dub-style "low end pressure" bass, felt in the music of King Tubby, Prince Jammy and Scientist, was the main element of their production style. According to The Wire, Bass Is Maternal foregrounds the bass, but experiments with synth melodies and heavy, distorted drum sounds which are juxtaposed with "ghostly backwards guitar effects" and feedback. They compared the album's experimental trawl through different genres and soundscapes to dub producers like King Tubby, Scientist and Dennis Bovell and experimental post-punk bands like Public Image Ltd.

"Hold On (Strange Mix)" is driven by distorted, backwards guitar, a breakbeat, ominous keyboards and a "sucked backwards" vocal, contributing to an atmosphere that The Wire said was "unlike anything you might have expected." Jeff Salamon of Spin compared the reversed guitars to My Bloody Valentine. "Drowning" is a poignant, iconoclastic cover of U2's "Drowning Man" that mixes drum and bass and dub music. "Accept All Contrasts" mixes rapping with a Motown backbeat and the live snare snap from U2's "Sunday Bloody Sunday". Salamon noted that the usage of the U2 sample was "years before DJ Shadow sampled it on 'Lost and Found'."

== Title and artwork ==
The album title Bass Is Maternal reflects the duo's incorporation of "enwombling" low-end frequency felt in Jamaican dub music. The association between bass sounds and maternal themes also feature in the album's vocals, while the artwork draws upon bass's perceived relationship with the beat of the heart. For instance, the cover of Bass Is Maternal shows a child stood beside the sea, presumably listening to "the heartbeat regularity of the tide," while the booklet contains four ultrasound scans of fetuses and a depiction of a young child reaching towards a bass speaker with the caption "Bass is maternal... When it's loud I feel safer." According to The Wire, the caption refers to "the kind of warm, enveloping sub-bass that reverberated through your solar plexus and rose up through the rib cage."

== Release and reception ==
Professional ratings
Review scores
Source	Rating
AllMusic	3/5 stars
Muzik	3/5 stars
Select	4/5 stars
Spin	7/10
The Virgin Encyclopedia of Dance Music	3/5 stars

Although the eventual 1995 release of Bass Is Maternal by More Rockers was described as long-awaited, the trip hop and ragga jungle styles the duo helped innovate had moved beyond them, as although Bristol had become recognised as the birthplace of trip hop, the duo remained obscure. The album was not a commercial success, although it peaked at number 35 on the UK R&B Albums Chart in November 1995. After being unavailable for some time, Bass Is Maternal was re-released by Studio !K7 on 13 June 2000. This reissue marked the album's first release in the United States, and reached number 9 on the CMJ Dance chart, compiled from reports of radio play.

In his book Drum 'n' Bass: The Rough Guide, writer Peter Shapiro wrote that Bass Is Maternal was released to "a rather lukewarm reception." In a contemporary review, Gary Mulholland of Select praised the "awkwardness" of the album, citing the track name "Odd Tune for Piano" and the inaccessibility of "Hold On (Strange Mix)" as examples. He felt the attitude reached "a surreal peak" with "Drowning" and "Accept All Contrasts", and concluded that although the album's release date was too late to make Smith & Mighty stars on Massive Attack's level, he felt the duo "probably couldn't be bothered with the hassle anyway." The Independent deemed Bass Is Maternal "thumping dub/jungle rhythms from the lost elders of ye Bristol scene", while The Guardian called it "as raw as it is thrillingly inventive." Less receptive was John Bush of AllMusic, who in a mixed review said the album featured "too much experimentation and not enough hooks," and felt that throughout the record, the duo "simply don't find a happy medium between jungle and reggae."

In a review of the reissue, Jeff Salamon of Spin praised the album's innovative, forward-thinking sound. Although he felt that the record was somewhat scattered, he characterised it favourably with one of Brian Eno's Oblique Strategies: "the gamut of choices open to an artist willing to surrender his or her ego." Writer Colin Larkin gave the album three stars out of five in The Virgin Encyclopedia of Dance Music, feeling that the record was characterised by its heavy usage of bass, despite its incorporation of denser jungle music.

== Legacy ==
"The record moved into drum 'n' bass territory but remained true to the duo's dub roots. It's one of the more gorgeous instances of the Bristol phenomenon, but it's also where the Smith & Mighty/More Rockers posse forms the missing link in Bristol's recent musical evolution."

—Tim Haslett of CMJ New Music Monthly (1998)

Bass Is Maternal has retrospectively been cited by critics as a groundbreaking album that, despite largely originating from 1989, helped predict various strands of mid-1990s music, especially that of the Bristol sound. Jeff Salamon of Spin described the album as "way ahead of its time–the sound of 1995, only recorded in 1989." Craig Roseberry of Billboard wrote that the "groundbreaking" album, and the duo's "desconstruted reconstructions" of Burt Bacharach songs in the late 1980s, "helped cement the act's underground cult status." The magazine also call the band the originators of "the Bristol sound". Tim Haslett of CMJ New Music Monthly called the album "gorgeous" and "underrated," while The Wire magazine said the album "provided a link between the past, present and future of the Bristol dance scene." In 2012, Music Is My Sanctuary called the album "one of the most influential UK records to come out in the last 20 years, setting the table for drum & bass and bass music in general."

In January 2001, Spin ranked the re-release among their list of the "Top 10 Reissues of the Year." In the accompanying text, Jon Caramanica called the duo "forefathers of Bristol's tripped-out bass-science scene" and wrote how they "explored all stripes of thick groove" throughout Bass Is Maternal. He cited "Jungle Man Corner" as birthing "the reggae-jungle connection five years ahead of schedule," and described the record as "hooking up Mad Professor and Massive Attack years before they did it themselves." The Wire also listed it among the best reissues of 2000. In 2015, Fact placed Bass Is Maternal at number 42 on their list of "The 50 Best Trip-Hop Albums of All Time". The website described the album as "the best representation" of the duo's scope, noting that it "illustrates their experimentation as they attempted to summarize the meeting point between UK rave culture and Jamaican dub. It's not always successful, but to ignore it is to disregard an important chapter in British musical history."

== Track listing ==
No.	Title	Length
1.	"Hold On (Strange Mix)"	3:15
2.	"Jungle Man Corner"	4:20
3.	"Closer"	5:07
4.	"Walking"	4:09
5.	"Evolve"	4:36
6.	"Drowning"	3:43
7.	"Accept All Contrasts"	3:35
8.	"Bass Is Maternal"	4:12
9.	"Down in Rwanda"	4:37
10.	"Higher Dub"	5:10
11.	"Maybe for Dub"	4:51
12.	"Time"	4:32
13.	"U Dub"	3:35
14.	"Yow He Koh"	2:37
15.	"Odd Tune for Piano"	5:05

== Charts ==
Chart	Peak position
UK R&B Albums (OCC)	35
