= The Call Is Strong =

Studio album by Carlton
- Released: January 1991
- Recorded: 1990
- Studio: Roundhouse Studios; Livingston Recording Studios; First Protocol, London
- Genre: Soul; dance; dub
- Length: 45:09
- Label: FFRR; 3 Stripe
- Producer: Smith & Mighty

Singles from The Call Is Strong
- 1. "Do You Dream" Released: 1990; 2. "Cool with Nature" Released: 1990; 3. "Love and Pain" Released: 1991

The Call Is Strong is the only album by Bristolian soul singer Carlton, released by FFRR Records in January 1991. Produced by Smith & Mighty, the album explores a relaxed style of soul and dance music flavoured by reggae, hip hop and house, featuring prominent electronic beats and sine bass, while Carlton sings love songs in falsetto. Recording sessions in London were fractious due to creative disagreements between Smith & Mighty and the label.

On release, The Call Is Strong was commercially unsuccessful, but featured three charting singles, including the minor hit "Love and Pain". Music critics drew attention to the album's distinctive sound and production, which received comparisons to Soul II Soul. The album has gone on to be considered among the greatest "lost" albums in British soul and the Bristol underground scene, and was named among the best albums of the 1990s by Fact.

== Background and recording ==
In 1988, Bristol-based singer Carlton debuted as the singer on Massive Attack's first single, a cover of Chaka Khan's "Any Love", and went on to support Neneh Cherry on her Bomb the Bass Tour. Produced in 1990, The Call Is Strong was Carlton's first album, and was fellow Bristol act Smith & Mighty's first production job after signing to FFRR, having already produced "Any Love" and other Bristol underground acts like Massive Attack's predecessors the Wild Bunch and Fresh 4's UK top ten hit "Wishing on a Star". The album is credited as a 3 Stripe production, referring to Smith & Mighty's posse. C. Clark acted as assistant to the producers and also contributed saxophone to "Cool with Nature", while Jeremy 'Digga' Allom and Paul Rabiger engineered the album with assistance from Leo Grant. Recording took place at London's Roundhouse, Livingston and First Protocol studios.

During the sessions, Smith & Mighty had creative differences with the label; Rob Smith of the duo reflected that FFRR kept saying the album "wasn't good enough", and that as a result it took a long time to record. The duo also struggled with writing and producing in the "sterile studio environment" in London, and their relationship with Carlton soon broke down. In an interview with The Vinyl Factory, Smith reflected on the album: "It could have been a lot better. [...] If you listen to some of the mixes we did before we went to London, they've got a much better vibe to them". According to Oli Warwick, the "unfettered, home-brewed mixes" of the album hint at "how great The Call Is Strong might have been – but the project remains too sour in both Rob and Ray's memories." The final album was mixed by Rabiger, Dave Botrill and Richard Manwaring at Livingston, Real World Studios and Bristol's Strip 3 Studio. Due to Smith & Mighty's fractious relationship with FFRR, The Call Is Strong was the only album they produced until their own record Bass Is Maternal (1995).

== Composition ==
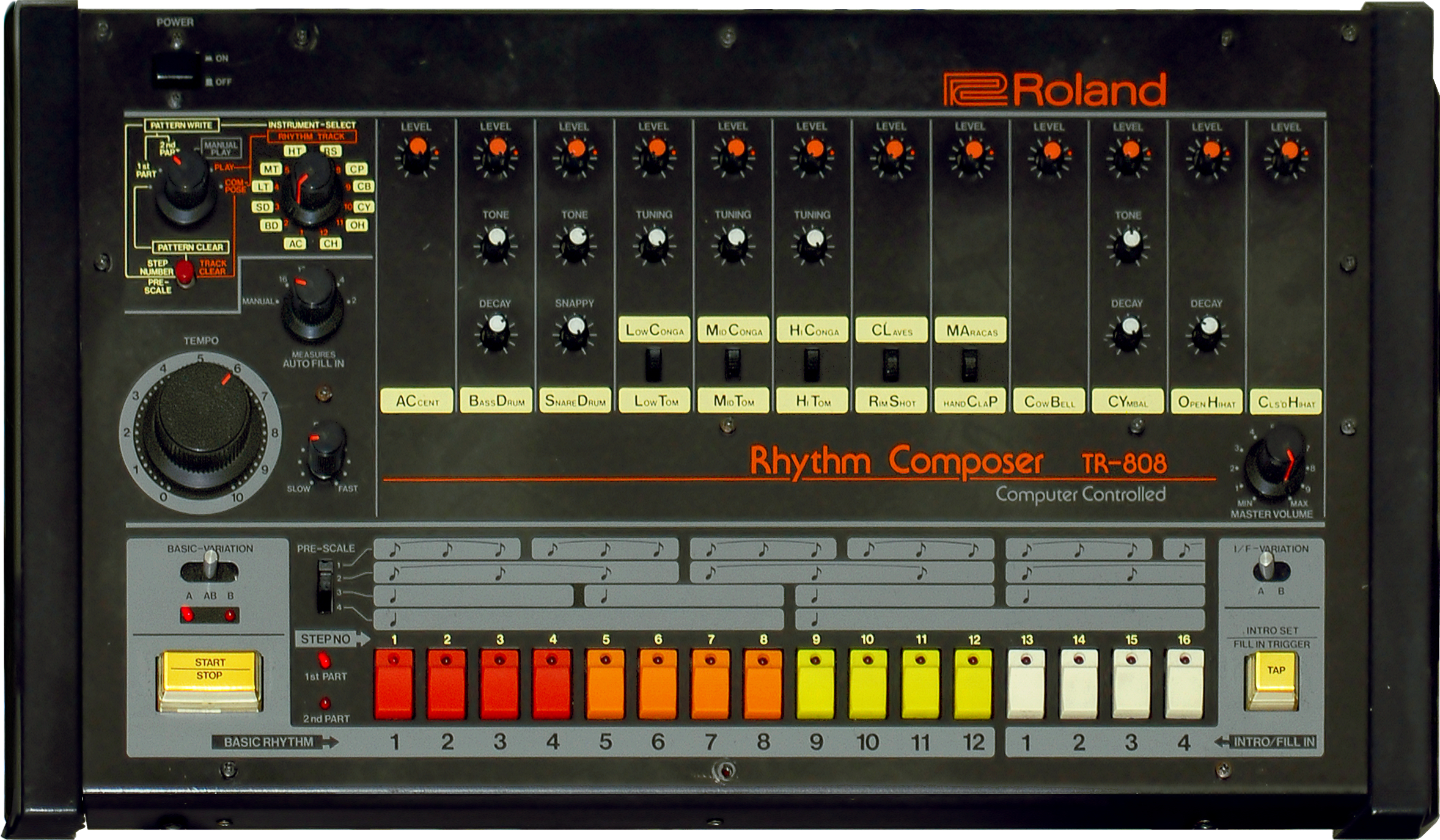
The Call Is Strong uses sub-bass and beats from the Roland TR-808 (pictured).

The Call Is Strong is a smooth album of Bristol soul music influenced by rave culture. According to writer Joe Muggs, the record combines soul, reggae and hip hop with "post-acid house influences", while retaining elements of older genres like electro and house. Robert Wheaton writes that, alongside "Wishing on a Star" and the work of the Wild Bunch, the album exhibits "where the singsong lilt of lovers rock met the swallowed aggression of dub, where the structure and confidence of American hip-hop met the residual brashness of punk and ska."

Smith & Mighty's beats span a range of touchstones, including digital reggae, new jack swing, early breakbeat hardcore and Balearic beat, while Carlton sings in a high falsetto, described by Muggs as a "rich and thoughtful croon" which is as individual and "equally unconstrained by genre" as the music. Writer Russell Brown writes that the album applies reggae to soul music via its use of space and "gentle dub-trickery" throughout, creating a similar sound to Soul II Soul. The mix leaves wide space between the rhythm and Carlton's vocals, with keyboard stabs sporadically filling the gap. As with "Any Love" and other Bristol scene releases like the Wild Bunch's "The Look of Love" (1987), prominent throughout the album is a mix of sine bass and Roland TR-808 beats; according to Wheaton, the effect of this combination "is to buoy as much as propel the vocals.

According to Brown, departures from the album's sweet soul sound appear with the clattering house track "Do You Dream" and "I Will Be", with its "tough little breakbeat". Muggs describes the former song, with its hovering breakbeats and echoed pianos, as a "unique and very British piece of dance music, unbeholden to any clichés of dance music structure as it unfolds and meanders along at its own pace, drawing you into its pensive meditations." "Cool with Nature" features a relaxed street soul sound, while "Come on Back" is an uptempo reggae song. "Love and Pain" is a piano ballad which features double bass; reviewer Gary Crossing compared Carlton's singing on the song to Smokey Robinson.

== Release and reception ==
Professional ratings
Review scores
Source	Rating
Record Mirror	4.5/5 stars
Select	4/5 stars

The Call Is Strong was released by FFRR and 3 Stripe in late January 1991. Although it was commercially unsuccessful, three singles from the album charted; "Do You Dream" reached number 81 on the UK Singles Chart in May 1990, "Cool with Nature" reached 90 in August and "Love and Pain" reached number 56 in February 1991. The single version of "Do You Dream" differed from the album mix, instead featuring a string-heavy deep house arrangement. "Love and Pain" was selected by Record Mirror as "Single of the Week".

In a contemporary review for Select, Russell Brown described The Call Is Strong as a rarity among dance productions for being "so deferential to the artist and yet so quietly tough and inventive". He complimented Carlton's "major musical intelligence" and meaningful love songs and further praised the album as further proof that "the adventurous spirit of British soul [in 1990] stands in strict contrast to the willingness of US soul producers to stick to formula". Iestyn George of Record Mirror described the album as a "remarkably assured collection of songs" and praised Smith & Mighty's bass-heavy dub production. A reviewer for The Courier and Advertiser described Carlton as differing from other dance artists by foregoing hard-hitting sounds for a "far more relaxed approach". They added that the songs are seductive but rarely well-rounded or catchy, considering them ideal for nightclub play, "somewhere between the intensity and uplift of Black Box or Soul II Soul and the smoochy ones that follow on right at the end."

Reviewing the album for Les Inrockuptibles, S. Davet grouped it alongside the work of Massive Attack for placing Bristol at the centre of innovative dance music, drawing attention to minimal rhythms, thick bass and spacious arrangements and Carlton's sensual, androgynous voice. A reviewer for Blues & Soul was less receptive to the album; they found Smith & Mighty to be "technically brilliant producers" who cultivate an impressive array of sounds – such as the "crystal-like piano, percussion and snare [sitting] in perfectly comfortably with warm, reverberating kick drum and bass sounds" – but considered Carlton to let the record down with relatively weak songs. They nonetheless highlighted "Love and Pain" for being an "invigorating, ballad single". In a 1991 feature for The Press and Journal, Steve Stewart wrote that Carlton was at "the forefront of the underground scene" and said the album "sets out a vision of dance music."

== Legacy ==
While The Call Is Strong was unsuccessful on release, it is now generally considered an unjustly overlooked British soul album. According to The Wire, the record is often considered to be "the lost gem" of Bristol's music scene; author Phil Johnson dubs it "the great lost album of the Bristol sound", while Muggs describes it as "something of a lost classic, a proper piece of individualist urban rave blues up there with Nicolette's 1992 Now Is Early." He wrote that both The Call Is Strong and Now Is Early established a blueprint for "how an artist album might harness the creativity of the rave, proof of concept for a singer-songwriter forging a distinct identity in this very British, very grass-roots format." In 2012, Fact ranked The Call Is Strong at number 83 in their list of "The 100 Best Albums of the 1990s", considering it to have aged better than Soul II Soul's Club Classics Vol. One (1989), adding: "It's a lost classic, make no mistake, and quite how it got so lost – especially given its clear abundance of pop and club appeal – is an absolute mystery." The website also included "Do You Dream" in a list of Smith & Mighty's greatest work.

Adamski names The Call Is Strong among his ten favourite albums, having been shown the record by Ricardo da Force on a European tour. He considers the album to feature "beautifully voiced melodic songs [...] It’s also quite melancholy and easy to cry to." In a conversation with Hard Wax's Finn Johannsen for Electronic Beats, disc jockey Holger Klein highlighted the record for helping introduce UK club music to German audiences via its popularity at the Mannheim nightclub Milk!, saying "At that time, it was very state of the art to incorporate elements of dub, contemporary US R&B, classic soul, reggae, electronic sounds and even some swingbeat bits. I fell in love with the ethereal and often spliffed-out vibe of the album and Carlton's songwriting." Wheaton credits the album, alongside the work of the Wild Bunch and Fresh 4, as a precursor to the "gleeful" style of rapper M.I.A.

== Track listing ==
All songs written by Carlton McCarthy, Rob Smith and Ray Mighty

1. "Cool with Nature" – 5:09
2. "I Know" – 5:05
3. "We Vie" – 3:51
4. "Come on Back" – 5:34
5. "Love and Pain" – 3:42
6. "Do You Dream" – 5:01
7. "Indication to You" – 4:09
8. "Please Leave" – 4:55
9. "I Will Be" – 3:07
10. "True Colours" – 4:36

== Personnel ==
Adapted from the liner notes of The Call Is Strong

- Carlton McCarthy – songwriter
- Rob Smith – production, songwriter
- Ray Smith – producer, songwriter
- C. Clark – assistant to the producer, saxophone (track 1)
- Dave Botrill – mixing
- Paul Rabiger – mixing, engineering
- Richard Manwaring – mixing
- Ben Jones – mixing assistant
- Jeremy 'Digga' Allom – engineering
- Leo Grant – engineering assistant
- Tim O'Sullivan – photography
- David Storey – design
