= Mark Donne =

British writer and blogger

- Occupation: Film-maker
- Known for: Writer for The Independent Director UK Gold Director The Rime of the Modern Mariner

Mark Donne is a filmmaker and writer. Formerly a reporter and journalist, Donne wrote for The Independent and The Guardian newspapers & has appeared as a commentator on relevant issues on BBC News, Sky News, Channel 4 News and other current affairs television programmes. Donne has writing and directing credits on two independent feature-length artist documentaries and various short films, and is a member of the Unit 3 Films collective, specialising in short film, long and short form documentary, arts feature and animated film.

== Early life and education ==
Mark Donne is English, from London, of mixed Celtic heritage. Donne received a vocational, postgraduate National Diploma in Journalism and subsequently an NQJ from the National Council for Training of Journalists in 2005.

== Career ==
=== Blogging and writing ===
Donne formerly produced a popular, political blog for The Independent online.

Donne has written comment articles for various UK national newspapers and magazines, including The Guardian, The Independent, Le Monde Diplomatique and The Big Issue.

== Short films and other projects ==
In early 2009, after producing various short films for The Independent online, Donne set up the film collective "Brass Moustache" with producer and Director of Photography Joe Morris. The collective was based in Soho, London.

Donne and Morris produced various short-form political documentaries including interviews with Noam Chomsky and former leader of the UK Labour Party Ed Miliband. They also collaborated on various music promo films for bands including "Lose My Way" for the UK indie-rock band TOY, which was chosen by "Creative Bloq" design magazine in its "25 Greatest Animated Music Videos".

In 2014 Donne and Morris were commissioned by Tate Britain to make a short film for the Ruin Lust exhibition which formed part of the multi-disciplinary show. The short featured a poetic script narrated by actor Louise Brealey which Mark Donne adapted from the text "Pleasure in Ruins" by Rose Macaulay.

In 2015 Donne and Morris made an artist documentary short filmed in the Ecuadorian Amazon; the film focused on the plight of indigenous communities and the natural environment being blighted by a colossal oil spillage. "Afectados" features narration from Hollywood icon Julie Christie, reading a version of Chilean poet Pablo Neruda's "United Fruit Company" and a field score from musician Drew McConnell & long term Banksy collaborator Jim Carey. US oil giant Chevron reacted furiously to the film, claiming that Texaco – later subsumed into Chevron – had cleaned up the impacted area adequately after ceasing operations.

In December 2015 Donne collaborated with Robert Del Naja of Massive Attack for a second time (see features) writing a short satirical film "La Fête est Finie" (The Party is Over) to mark the historic Paris Climate change conference or COP21. The short, jointly directed with Joe Morris under the Brass Moustache moniker, was also scored by Del Naja and former Mercury Music Prize winning band Young Fathers and was produced by Forest Swords.

Starring Utopia actor Fiona O'Shaughnessy & Natasha O'Keeffe (Sherlock, Peaky Blinders, The Last Panthers) in a cast of over 25, the film premiered with The Guardian newspaper and Pitchfork simultaneously and was screened in Paris during the climate change summit.

In Sept 2016, Donne delivered an evocative film commission to the inaugural Estuary Festival set on the River Thames, entitled “Listening with Frontiersman”. The six-screen film installation was arranged in the historic Coalhouse Fort, and featured sound recording and design from Banksy collaborator Jim Carey and musical samples from Thom Yorke. Donne later explained in an interview with BBC 6 Music that the work blended the notion of the river and the water as a potential gateway to safety or security, with the "absurd and deadly" reality of the relationship between UK arms sales to despotic regimes and the refugee crisis. Excerpts of the work also featured on BBC Arts.

In 2018, Donne worked as co-curator and editor-in-chief of the Rapid Response Unit in Liverpool. The novel project combined artists of various disciplines with real time news events, and operated from a makeshift news bureau constructed in St John's Shopping Centre – the bureau was fully open to the public to deposit any news they saw fit. During the one-year project, Donne's notable commissions included Turner Prize-winning artist Lubaina Himid's exploration of unconscious racism in The Guardian newspaper (in collaboration with The Guardian), Damon Albarn and the Orchestra of Syrian Musicians creation of a new piece of music to mark St Georges Day at the Liverpool Philharmonic Hall, the first ever public work by satirical artist Coldwar Steve on the “media landscape”, a public ode to Egyptian footballer from poet and writer Musa Okwonga, an exploration of self-photography and the work of artist Francesca Woodman with musician Charli XCX, and a “mini daily mail” distributed freely to the public by artist Darren Cullen. Halfway through the RRU project, the Huffington Post moved its own national news bureau entirely into a shopping centre for a week.

Donne collaborated further with Robert Del Naja and Massive Attack in July 2020 – conceptualising and producing the multimedia “Eutopia EP”. The innovative work comprises permutating visuals from leading machine learning artist Mario Klingemann and – as well as new music from Massive Attack – musical and lyrical contributions from New York City poet Saul Williams, Mercury prize winning Young Fathers and UK/US punk outfit Algiers.

Combining again with Del Naja and Klingemann in January 2021 – this time under commission to fashion house Valentino and Valentino Creative Director Pierpaulo Piccioli – Donne is credited with joint concept and the original script for Code Temporal, an experimental short film featuring permutating neural imagery and creation footage from the Valentino atelier in Rome, with sound design from Del Naja and interplaying, intercutting text and quotations. Inspired by the collaboration, the Valentino 2021 Spring/Summer Haute Couture collection itself was named Code Temporal – giving the overall project greater narrative identity.

In November 2021, Donne co-produced and directed the conceptual “Eightfold” in collaboration with black and Asian company Ballet Black. The experiential eight film suite of work features a script from playwright Natasha Gordon and narration from actor Thandiwe Newton, as well as new choreography from eight international choreographers. The films were acquired and broadcast by Channel 4 and are presently streaming on ALL4.

=== The Rime of the Modern Mariner ===
The feature film The Rime of the Modern Mariner received a UK premiere in St Anne's Church in London, introduced by actor and playwright Steven Berkoff and performed with a live orchestral score, led by members of The Klaxons and Babyshambles and script narration from Carl Barat of the UK rock band The Libertines.

"The Rime of the Modern Mariner" received a US premiere at the 2010 SXSW Film Festival in Austin, Texas. The film was subsequently the subject of a BBC1 cultural feature transmitted in June 2010, and was chosen as The Times newspaper "Film of the Week", was the subject of a major feature in VICE Magazine. The film was official selection at various film festivals including Flanders International Film Festival Ghent (Belgium), Cinecity Brighton Film Festival (UK), Mexico City Film Festival (Mexico), and remains attached to a programme of forthcoming international festivals. The film also received prestigious theatrical screenings at Pompidou Centre (France), BAFTA Arena of Latitude Festival (UK), The Royal Maritime Museum (UK) and the Museum of London (UK).

The artist documentary received wide critical acclaim, with The Times arts editor Alex O'Connell writing "The film evokes the waterside architecture, music and arcane language, set to a score that samples a creaking hull, hammering cargoes and engine room rhythms" and The Guardian film editor Catherine Shoard stating "Something of that rock'n'roll spirit has survived in Mark Donne's movie: a stylish essay that combines chinwags with East End sea dogs with a gonzo two-week adventure on the high seas with the crew of a Maersk cargo boat."

=== UK Gold ===
The UK Gold, a collaboration with Thom Yorke of Radiohead and Robert Del Naja of Massive Attack was completed in 2013 and won the Jury Best Documentary prize at the East End Film Festival, under chair US Director Morgan Spurlock. The film, which is narrated by Dominic West, toured international film festivals. It received a European premiere at Copenhagen International Documentary Festival (CPH:DOX) as "official selection", where it received a nomination for the "FACT Journalism Prize". The film has also been broadcast in 63 territories including RTE 1 in Ireland, CBC in Canada and others scheduled. In February 2015 Del Naja, Yorke and Donne released the full soundtrack to the film via the UK Uncut activist group.

The film is now streaming across all territories on Amazon Prime Video and Apple TV with the US title Offshore Incorporated.

== Other projects ==
Since 2004, Donne has worked with Latin American human rights organisations and appeared as a guest of Venezuelan President Hugo Chávez on a live broadcast of his television programme "Alo Presidente" in September 2007.

In 2006–07, Donne was also a member of the small political team behind the Labour MP and anti-racist campaigner Jon Cruddas in his bid to become Deputy Leader of the British Labour Party. Cruddas won the popular vote but eventually lost the competition following preference voting rounds to Harriet Harman. The Cruddas campaign, however, was voted "political campaign of the year" at the Channel 4 News 2008 political awards. Donne is connected to the British left-wing pressure group think-tank Compass.

On 8 February 2008, The Independent reported that Mark Donne has called for the closing of tax loopholes for the very wealthiest in Britain and for a rise in the living wage levels for the poorest in the British economy. 10 Downing Street responded by explaining that via their own tax initiatives "non-dom" business taxation would go some way to closing the disparity of tax burden between the richest and poorest. The broader context for this debate is the rising anger within the UK of the perceived injustice of the taxation system and stagnant levels of social mobility.

On behalf of charities such as Oxfam, Child Poverty Action Group and Gingerbread (One Parent Families), Donne lead a national campaign to urge the wealthiest Premier League football clubs to pay off the pitch staff, including cleaners and hospitality workers, a living wage.

=== Instigate Debate ===
In August 2008, Donne set up Instigate Debate with musicians Jon McClure, Carl Barat, and Drew McConnell. The rolling initiative is designed to re-engage young people with contemporary political debate and to call into question the effect of the corporately owned media on the British democratic processes.

Donne introduced the project in The Guardian and The Independent.
