= Eutopia (EP) =

2020 EP by Massive Attack

- Screenshot of the teaser video announcing the release of the EP

EP video by Massive Attack
- Released: 10 July 2020
- Genre: Trip hop
- Length: 13:54

Massive Attack chronology
Ritual Spirit (2016)	Eutopia (2020)

Playlist
- Eutopia EP playlist on YouTube

Massive Attack
(@MassiveAttackUK)
tweeted:

English:

Eutopia [Noun] ‘A place of well-being, as a practical aspiration (compared with utopia as an impossible concept).”

10 July 2020

Eutopia is a 2020 EP by British trip hop group Massive Attack, released on July 10, 2020 on the band's YouTube account as a collection of three music videos; as of October 2026, it remains unavailable on music streaming services. The EP represents the band's first work in four years, following the 2016 releases of the Ritual Spirit EP and the single "The Spoils".

Recorded during the early months of the COVID-19 pandemic, the three tracks feature spoken word passages from influential academics calling for action on climate change, tax havens and universal basic income.

== Background ==
During the spring of 2020, Robert "3D" Del Naja worked on a politically-themed audio-visual Massive Attack EP called “Eutopia”, consisting of three tracks created across five cities during the COVID-19 global lockdown period, with documentary filmmaker Mark Donne, AI Art pioneer Mario Klingemann and vocal collaborations with Algiers, Young Fathers and US poet Saul Williams. The spirit of the EP was inspired by Thomas More's 16th century book Utopia to address the need for global change amid COVID-19 pandemic.

Each of the tracks of Eutopia discusses a political issue – the climate crisis, tax havens, and universal basic income – accompanied with relevant commentary by public academics Christiana Figueres, Guy Standing, and Gabriel Zucman.

Professor Standing of the SOAS University of London said in an interview on the university website: "The collaboration began when Massive Attack contacted me after the pandemic hit, which was shortly after my new book came out in March. I think they had read or at least seen my earlier book, which is my analysis of the ethical and economic foundations of basic income."

== Visuals ==
The visuals for the music videos were co-written and co-produced by Robert Del Naja and documentary filmmaker Mark Donne, using artificial intelligence manipulated by Mario Klingemann. He has previously collaborated with Massive Attack and filmmaker Adam Curtis on the Mezzanine XXI show.

== Track listing ==
All tracks are written by Robert Del Naja and Euan Dickinson.

No.	Title	Length
1.	"#CLIMATEEMERGENCY" (with Algiers and narration by Christiana Figueres)	4:20
2.	"#TAXHAVENS" (with Saul Williams and narration by Gabriel Zucman)	4:13
3.	"#UNIVERSALBASICINCOME" (with Young Fathers and narration by Guy Standing)	5:21
Total length:		13:54

== Personnel ==
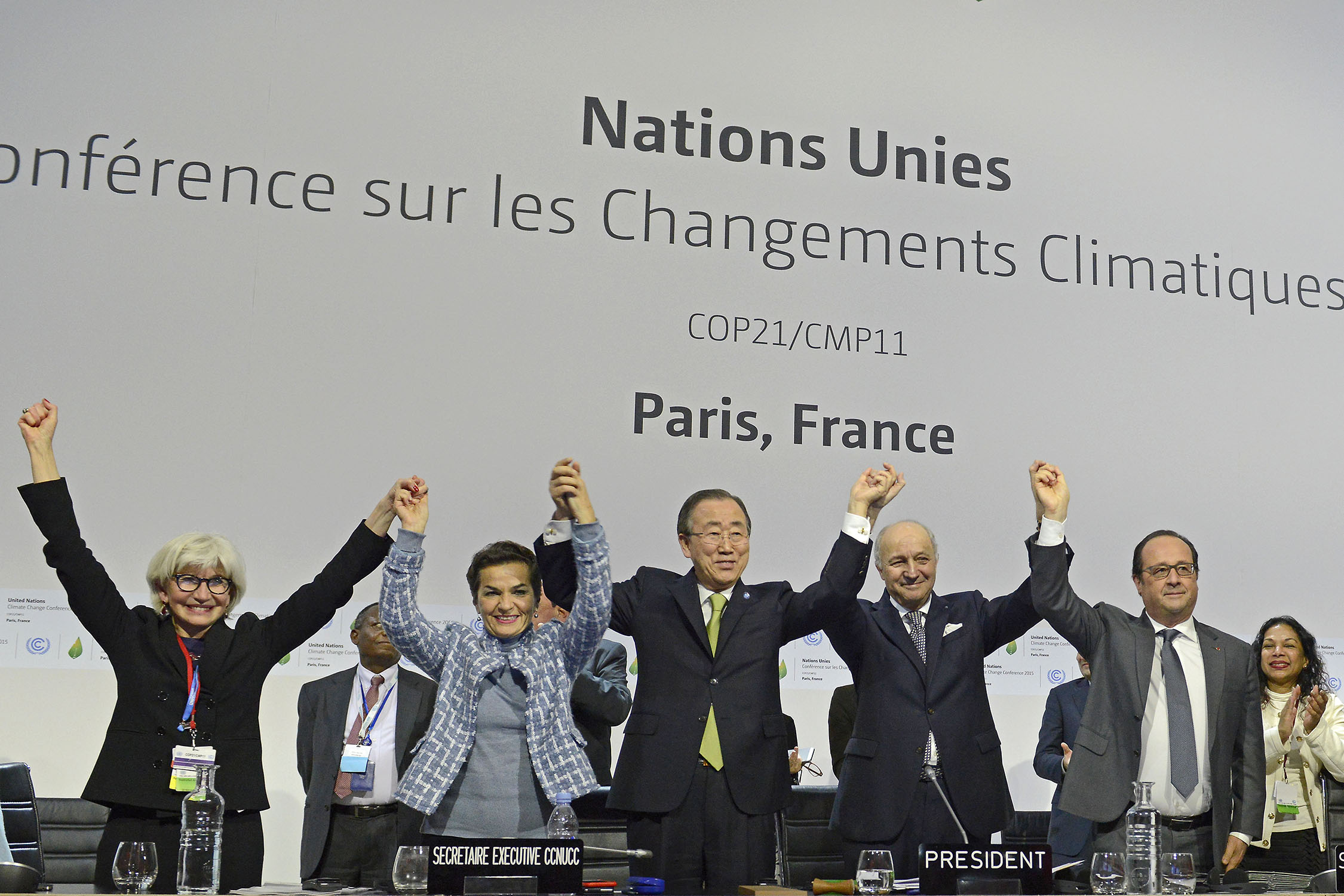
Costa Rican diplomat Christiana Figueres (seen above, third from left) who contributed to drafting the 2015 Paris Agreement discusses approaches to combatting climate change on the track "#CLIMATEEMERGENCY"

Massive Attack

- Robert "3D" Del Naja

Additional musicians

- Euan Dickinson – Sound Engineer
- Algiers
  - Franklin James Fisher – vocals
  - Ryan Mahan – bass guitar
  - Lee Tesche – guitar
  - Matt Tong – drums
- Saul Williams
- Young Fathers
  - Kayus Bankole
  - 'G' Hastings
  - Alloysious Massaquoi

Spoken word

- Christiana Figueres
- Guy Standing
- Gabriel Zucman

Visuals

- Robert Del Naja
- Mark Donne
- Mario Klingemann
