= Ritual Spirit =

EP by Massive Attack
- Released: 28 January 2016
- Genre: Trip hop; electronica
- Length: 17:13
- Label: Virgin
- Producer: Robert Del Naja; Adrian Thaws; Grant Marshall; Euan Dickinson

Massive Attack chronology
Heligoland (2010)	Ritual Spirit (2016)	Eutopia (2020)

Ritual Spirit is an EP by British trip hop collective Massive Attack, released on 28 January 2016. It features trip hop artist Tricky for the first time since the release of Protection in 1994, and also features Scottish hip-hop group Young Fathers, London rapper Roots Manuva and singer Azekel.

== Background ==
A week before the release of the EP, the group released an iPhone application called "The Fantom", which remixed songs using heartbeat, location and time of day. The app contained snippets of the songs featured on the EP, and promised full functionality "soon".

== Critical reception ==
Professional ratings
Aggregate scores
Source	Rating
Metacritic	81/100
Review scores
Source	Rating
AllMusic	3/5 stars
Drowned in Sound	9/10
The Music	3.5/5 stars
Pitchfork	7.0/10
PopMatters	8/10
Pretty Much Amazing	B+
Renowned for Sound	5/5 stars
The Sydney Morning Herald	4/5 stars

Ritual Spirit received widespread critical acclaim from contemporary music critics. At Metacritic, which assigns a normalized rating out of 100 to reviews from mainstream critics, the album received an average score of 81, based on 4 reviews, which indicates "universal acclaim".

John Garratt of PopMatters praised the EP, stating, "Pretty much everything that helped the band make a name for itself is on display for these four songs—the simmering tension of title track, the sample-happy soundtrack for urban decay on the opener 'Dead Editors', the hot and steady boil of 'Voodoo in My Blood', and the morose single 'Take It There' featuring the return of Tricky." Katherine St. Asaph of Pitchfork Media gave the EP a favorable review, stating, "Massive Attack were always equally as good producers as they were curators; it's promising that, as much of their old sound as they've retained, they've kept this as well."

== Track listing ==
No.	Title	Writer(s)	Length
1.	"Dead Editors" (featuring Roots Manuva)	Euan Dickinson; Robert Del Naja; Rodney Hylton Smith; Herbie Hancock	4:46
2.	"Ritual Spirit" (featuring Azekel)	Dickinson; Del Naja; Azekel Adesuyi	3:55
3.	"Voodoo in My Blood" (featuring Young Fathers)	Dickinson; Del Naja; Alloysious Massaquoi; Kayus Bankole; Graham Hastings	4:01
4.	"Take It There" (featuring Tricky)	Dickinson; Del Naja; Adrian Thaws	4:31
Total length:			17:13

Notes

- "Dead Editors" contains a sample from "Watermelon Man" (1962) by Herbie Hancock.

== Personnel ==
- Robert "3D" Del Naja – vocals (4), keyboards, guitar, programming, arranging, mixing, producer
- Euan Dickinson – keyboards, programming, producer
- Neil Davidge – programming, piano (4)
- Roots Manuva – vocals (1)
- Azekel – vocals (2)
- Young Fathers - vocals (3)
- Adrian "Tricky" Thaws – vocals (4)
- Jeff Wootton – Guitar (3)
- Laurie Ross – programming (2)
- Kidkanevil - programming (3)
- Cold Specks - additional vocals (1)

== Charts ==
Chart (2016)	Peak position
Belgium (Ultratip Bubbling Under Wallonia)	34
France (SNEP)	30
Germany (GfK)	96
Italian Vinyl Records (FIMI)	5
US Top Dance Albums (Billboard)	4
