= Azekel =

British singer and record producer

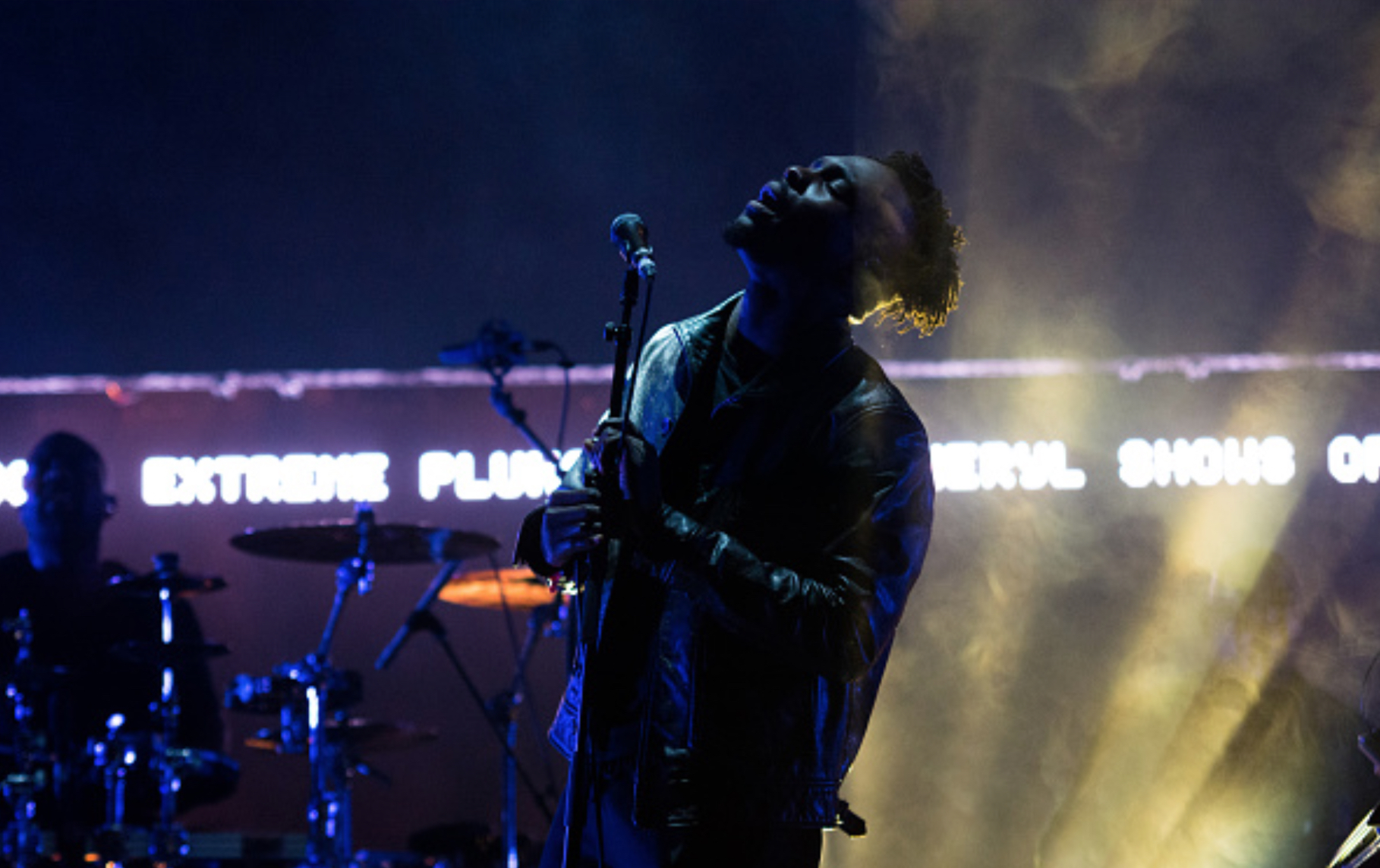
- Azekel performing at Hyde Park in 2016

Background information
- Born: Ademola Azekel Adesuyi; Abuja, Nigeria
- Origin: London, England
- Genres: Soul, R&B, Electronic, Pop
- Occupations: Singer-songwriter, producer, musician,
- Instruments: Vocals, piano, keyboard, bass, guitar
- Years active: 2015–present

Ademola Azekel Adesuyi, who uses the stage name Azekel, is a Nigerian-born singer, songwriter, and record producer from London. Azekel has released three solo EPs: Circa, Raw, Vol. 1, (2015) and Raw, Vol. 2, (2016).

== Career ==
=== 2015: Raw, Vol. 1 ===
Raw, Vol. 1 was released digitally on iTunes via Thunderlightning Recordings on 21 June 2015. It includes the lead singles "New Romance", "Mad About The Boy", and "Chronophobia". "New Romance" gained national wide radio play, and has been supported by a variety of blogs and artists, most notably Prince.

=== 2016: Collaboration with Massive Attack ===
Azekel collaborated with the Bristol trip hop group Massive Attack, as he is featured on the title track of their EP, Ritual Spirit released on 28 January 2016.

=== 2017: Collaboration with Gorillaz ===
Azekel collaborated with the British virtual band Gorillaz, and contributed to their fifth studio album Humanz on the track "Momentz" featuring De La Soul, and appeared on the super deluxe version of the album on the track "Midnite Float". The album was released on 28 April 2017 via Parlophone and Warner Bros. Records.

== Discography ==
=== EPs ===
Title	Album details
Raw, Vol. 1	Released: 15 June 2015; Label: Thunderlightning Recordings; Formats: CD, digital download
Raw, Vol. 2	Released: 11 August 2016; Label: Thunderlightning Recordings; Formats: CD, digital download

=== Guest appearances ===
Title	Year	Artist(s)	Album
"Ritual Spirit"	2016	Massive Attack	Ritual Spirit EP
"Momentz"	2017	Gorillaz, De La Soul	Humanz
"Midnite Float"	2017	Gorillaz	Humanz
