= Smith & Mighty =

English trip hop group

- Origin: Bristol, England
- Genres: Trip hop
- Years active: 1987–present
- Labels: Studio !K7, Three Stripe, Beatmaster Records
- Members: Rob Smith; Ray Mighty; Peter D Rose

Smith & Mighty are an English trip hop group from Bristol, England, consisting of Rob Smith, Ray Mighty and Peter D Rose. They pioneered the Bristol sound producing Massive Attack's "Any Love". The Bristol sound being a precursor to trip hop. As well as producing for others, they produced their own work, and various solo projects and collaborations.

== Biography ==
In the late 1980s, they produced their first releases; were breakbeat covers of "Anyone Who Had a Heart" and "Walk On By". Both songs entered the UK Singles Chart.

They produced Massive Attack's first single, "Any Love" released in 1988. In 1989, they produced "Wishing on a Star" for Fresh 4, a group consisting of Paul Southey (Suv), Krust, Judge and Flynn Thompson. The track was an early example of the Bristol sound; it exposed more people to the style charting in the UK at number 10.

Smith and Mighty left London in 1994. Shortly after leaving they set up 'More Rockers' the record label.

== Rob Smith ==
Rob Smith (alias include More Rockers and RSD) is an English DJ, musician and remixer from Bristol, England. Previously on the now defunct Grand Central Records independent record label, playing breakbeat hip-hop, dub and reggae-influenced music, more recently producing dubstep tracks as RSD on a number of labels. Since 1987, he worked with Ray Mighty and Peter D Rose in Smith & Mighty. Smith was formerly a drum & bass/jungle DJ.

From the early 1990s to early 2000s, Smith and Rose produced music under the moniker of More Rockers. Smith and Mighty left London in 1994. Shortly after leaving they set up 'More Rockers' the record label.

In 2018, Smith released a compilation album to raise money for homeless people in Bristol.

== Discography ==
Studio albums

- Bass Is Maternal (More Rockers, 1995)
- Big World Small World (Studio !K7, 2000)
- Life Is... (Studio !K7, 2002)
- The Ashley Road Sessions 88-94 (Punch Drunk, 2018)

Compilation albums

- Retrospective (Studio !K7, 2004)
- The Three Stripe Collection 1985-1990 (Bristol Archive Records, 2012)

DJ mix albums

- DJ-Kicks: Smith & Mighty (Studio !K7, 1998)

EPs

- Stepper's Delight (Three Stripe/London/PolyGram, 1992)
- Remember Me (Three Stripe/London/PolyGram, 1994)

Singles

- "Walk On..." (Three Stripe, 1988)
- "Anyone..." (Three Stripe, 1988)
- "Same" (More Rockers, 1996)
- "No Justice" (Studio !K7, 1999)
- "Seeds" (Studio !K7, 1999)
- "Life Has a Way" / "B-Line Fi Blow" (Studio !K7, 2002)
- "Maybe It's Me" (Studio !K7, 2002)

Productions

- Carlton - The Call Is Strong (1990)

Remixes

- Neneh Cherry - "Manchild" (1988)
- M People - "Search for the Hero" (1995)

=== Rob Smith discography ===
- Solo
  - Up on the Downs (Oct 2003)
- As More Rockers
  - Dub Plate Selection Volume One (1995)
  - Selection 2 (1998)
  - Select Cuts from More Rockers 12" Selection (2001)
- With Jaz Klash
  - Thru the Haze (1996)
- As RSD
  - Decades (2023)
  - With Punch Drunk
    - "Corner Dub (Blue and Red Mix)/Pretty Bright Light"
