= DJ-Kicks: Smith & Mighty =

Compilation album by Smith & Mighty
- Released: 9 March 1998
- Genre: Drum and bass
- Length: 71:51
- Label: Studio !K7
- Producer: Smith & Mighty

Smith & Mighty chronology
Bass Is Maternal (1995)	DJ-Kicks: Smith & Mighty (1998)	Big World Small World (2000)

DJ-Kicks chronology
Terranova (1998)	Smith & Mighty (1998)	Andrea Parker (1998)

Professional ratings
Review scores
Source	Rating
Allmusic	4/5 stars

DJ-Kicks: Smith & Mighty is a DJ mix album, mixed by Smith & Mighty. It was released on 9 March 1998 on the Studio !K7 independent record label as part of the DJ-Kicks series.

- CD Cat number: !K7065CD
- Vinyl Cat number: !K7065LP

== Track listing ==
1. "Amid The Ether" (featuring Shandi I) – Blue & Red – 3:25
2. "Rwanda" (featuring Andy Scholes) – Smith & Mighty – 2:40
3. "Jah Pure & Clear" – Peter D – 2:48
4. "Walk On" – Smith & Mighty – 3:12
5. "Same" – Smith & Mighty – 3:15
6. "Quite Frankly" – DJ Lynx – 3:45
7. "Mr. A&R Man" – Steve Wilks – 3:44
8. "Irrational" – Receiver – 1:39
9. "Anyone" (featuring Jacki Jackson) – Smith & Mighty – 3:46
10. "Night Fall" – More Rockers – 3:26
11. "First Time" (More Rockers remix) – On – 2:28
12. "Sole Sentiment" – Ratman – 2:40
13. "Higher Dub" – Smith & Mighty – 2:07
14. "Never Felt This Way" – More Rockers – 2:40
15. "Sound Boy" – More Rockers – 2:56
16. "Show Love" – More Rockers – 3:17
17. "Rainbows" (More Rockers Remix) – Virginia – 3:42
18. "New World" – Flynn & Flora – 3:34
19. "Off The Edge" – Jaz Klash – 1:18
20. "Bass Speaker" (DJ Krust Remix) – Flynn & Flora – 3:11
21. "1-2-3 Break" – More Rockers – 2:59
22. "Tripitaka" – Wraparound Sounds – 2:27
23. "Vibrations" – Gang Related – 3:11
24. "DJ-Kicks"/"I Don't Know" (featuringAlice Perera) – Smith & Mighty – 3:41
