= Carlton (singer) =

English singer-songwriter

- Born: Carlton McCarthy; Bristol, England
- Genres: Soul; dance; Bristol sound
- Occupations: Singer; songwriter
- Years active: 1987–present
- Label: FFRR

Carlton McCarthy, known mononymously as Carlton, is a singer and songwriter from Bristol, England. He is known for singing on Massive Attack's debut single "Any Love" (1987), also the first production by Smith & Mighty. It was later named one of Smith & Mighty's best productions by Fact.

In 1991, he released his own album, the Smith & Mighty-produced The Call Is Strong, later included by Fact in their list of the 1990s' greatest albums, and considered one of the finest albums of the Bristol underground scene. Three singles reached the UK Singles Chart; "Do You Dream" at number 81, "Cool with Nature" at number 90 in August and "Love and Pain" at number 56. In 1995, Bomb the Bass collaborated with Carlton on their single "1 to 1 Religion". Found on the former album's Clear, it reached number 53 on the UK Singles Chart in March 1995. He released the single "Lovetime" on 4 November 1996. In 1999, he collaborated with speed garage act Serious Danger on "Do U Dream".

== Discography ==
=== Albums ===
- The Call Is Strong (1991)

=== Singles ===
- "Any Love" (with Daddy G and Massive Attack) (1988)
- "Do You Dream" (1990)
- "Cool with Nature" (1990)
- "Please Leave" (Steve Jervier Mixes) (1990)
- "Love and Pain" (1991)
- "1 to 1 Religion" (with Bomb the Bass) (1995)
- "Lovetime" (1996)
- "I Like It"/"So Much More" (1998)
- "Do U Dream" (with Serious Danger) (1999)
