= Up on the Downs =

Studio album by Rob Smith
- Released: 27 October 2003
- Genre: Electronic, hip hop, dub
- Length: 58:22
- Label: Grand Central Records; GCCD123

Professional ratings
Review scores
| Source | Rating |
|---|---|
| AllMusic | 4/5 stars |
| Uncut | 2/5 stars |

Up on the Downs is the first solo record by the DJ Rob Smith, and his first release on the Grand Central Records independent record label.

== Critical reception ==
Fact thought that "the unfeasibly funky breakbeat dub 'Tru Rub' is the party rocking chest-rattler of the collection, but it’s the exquisite 'Singapore' that bears the most repeat listening."

AllMusic wrote that "the same backbeats and cut-ups that made Smith and Mighty such a force to deal with are extremely evident and provide an album-length worth of moody, introspective hip hop ideal for long walks on cold winter days."

== Track listing ==
1. "Rock Dope Stupid (R & R Mix)" – 5:53
2. "Angels in Poverty" (featuring Kelz & Rudy Lee) – 4:50
3. "Revolve" – 4:30
4. "Living in Unity (Wonderful World mix)" (featuring Ghadian) – 6:11
5. "Reverie" – 4:10
6. "Great Escape" – 4:44
7. "Tru Rub" – 4:45
8. "Question (Blue & Red Rework)" (featuring Ghadian) – 5:23
9. "Don't You See" (featuring Hazel Jayne) – 4:31
10. "Singapore" – 3:47
11. "Jah Provide" – 4:08
12. "Likeminded" (featuring Alice Perera) – 5:30
