= Big World Small World =

Studio album by Smith & Mighty
- Released: 2000
- Genre: Trip hop
- Length: 57:40
- Label: Studio !K7
- Producer: Rob Smith, Ray Mighty, Peter D Rose

Smith & Mighty chronology
| DJ-Kicks: Smith & Mighty (1998) | Big World Small World (2000) | Life Is... (2002) |

Singles from Big World Small World
- 1. "No Justice" Released: 1999; 2. "Seeds" Released: 1999

Professional ratings
Review scores
| Source | Rating |
|---|---|
| AllMusic | 3.5/5 stars |
| The A.V. Club | favorable |
| Billboard | favorable |
| CMJ New Music Monthly | favorable |
| CMJ New Music Report | favorable |

Big World Small World is the second studio album by Smith & Mighty, released on Studio !K7 in 2000.

== Critical reception ==
Andy Kellman of AllMusic gave the album 3.5 stars out of 5, saying, "It's just a little disappointing that S&M couldn't bring any innovations to the table here, as they have in the far too distant past." Bill Werde of CMJ New Music Monthly said, "It might not make the next easily marketable friendly face of urban music, but it makes for a damn fine album."

Joshua Klein of The A.V. Club said, "A seamless mix of trip-hop, reggae, dub, rap, R&B, and funk, Smith & Mighty's second album may be the most enjoyable chill-out album since Massive Attack's opening salvo." M. Tye Comer of CMJ New Music Report called it "the most socially conscious and, arguably, most poignant album of the trip-hop era." Michael Paoletta of Billboard said, "Smith & Mighty have crafted a sound that can be best described as mood music."

== Track listing ==
| No. | Title | Length |
|---|---|---|
| 1. | "Intro" | 2:11 |
| 2. | "Move You Run" (featuring Tammy Payne) | 4:54 |
| 3. | "No Justice" (featuring Rudy Lee) | 4:25 |
| 4. | "Year 2000" (featuring Niji 40 and L.D.) | 5:46 |
| 5. | "That Woman" (featuring Tammy Payne) | 5:22 |
| 6. | "Small World" (featuring Alice Perera) | 6:24 |
| 7. | "Believers" (featuring Tammy Payne) | 5:44 |
| 8. | "Seeds" (featuring Kelz) | 6:31 |
| 9. | "The Way We Feel" (featuring Alice Perera) | 5:05 |
| 10. | "Same" (featuring Tammy Payne) | 6:25 |
| 11. | "Rescue Me Pt. II" (featuring L.D.) | 4:51 |
