= Massive Attack =

English trip hop group

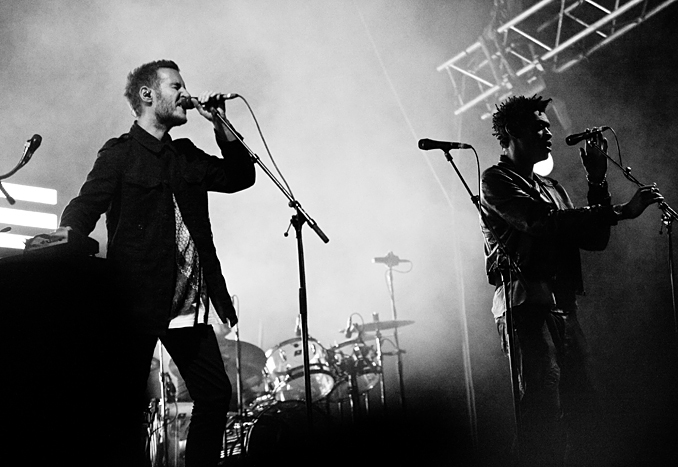
- 3D and Daddy G performing in Saint Petersburg, Russia in 2010

Background information
- Also known as: Massive (Note: The group was temporarily known simply as "Massive" in 1991 (for the release of "Unfinished Sympathy" and some editions of Blue Lines) due to the Gulf War.)
- Origin: Bristol, England
- Genres: Trip hop; electronic
- Years active: 1988–present
- Labels: Wild Bunch; Circa; Virgin; PIAS
- Spinoff of: The Wild Bunch
- Members: 3D; Daddy G
- Past members: Tricky; Mushroom
- Website: massiveattack.co.uk

Massive Attack are an English trip hop collective formed in 1988 in Bristol, England, by Robert "3D" Del Naja, Grant "Daddy G" Marshall, Adrian "Tricky" Thaws and Andrew "Mushroom" Vowles. As of October 2026, the group consists of Del Naja and Marshall.

They released their debut album in 1991, Blue Lines, which has been included on numerous best-of lists and is generally considered the first album of the trip-hop genre. The single "Unfinished Sympathy" was a chart hit in Europe, including number one on the Dutch Top 40, and was later voted the 63rd-greatest song of all time in a poll by NME. In 1994, they released their second album, Protection. Thaws left the band later that year to pursue a solo career. In 1998, they released their third album, Mezzanine, giving them their first number one on the UK Albums Chart. Mezzanine contains the top-10 single "Teardrop". In 1999, Vowles left the band, with Del Naja and Marshall continuing as a duo. They further released the albums 100th Window (2003) and Heligoland (2010).

Both Blue Lines and Mezzanine feature in Rolling Stone's list of the 500 Greatest Albums of All Time. The group have collaborated with several recurring guest vocalists, including Horace Andy, Shara Nelson, Tracey Thorn, Elizabeth Fraser, Sinéad O'Connor, Damon Albarn and Hope Sandoval.

Massive Attack's awards include a Brit Award for Best British Dance Act, two MTV Europe Music Awards, and two Q Awards. Their five studio albums have sold over 13 million copies worldwide. Massive Attack also support several political, human rights and environmental causes.

== History ==
=== The Wild Bunch and "Any Love" (1980s–1990) ===
DJs Daddy G and Mushroom, and rappers Tricky and 3D met as members of partying collective the Wild Bunch in the early 1980s. One of the first homegrown sound systems in the UK, the Wild Bunch became dominant on the Bristol club scene in the mid-1980s.

Massive Attack was created in 1988 as a spin-off quartet. Unsigned, the group (Mushroom, Daddy G, 3D and Tricky) put out "Any Love" as a single. It was co-produced by Bristol double-act Smith & Mighty and featured the falsetto-voiced singer-songwriter Carlton McCarthy. In 1990, they committed to deliver six studio albums and a "best of" compilation to Circa Records. This record label became a subsidiary of, and was later subsumed into, Virgin Records, which in turn was acquired by EMI.

=== Blue Lines and "Unfinished Sympathy" (1991–1993) ===
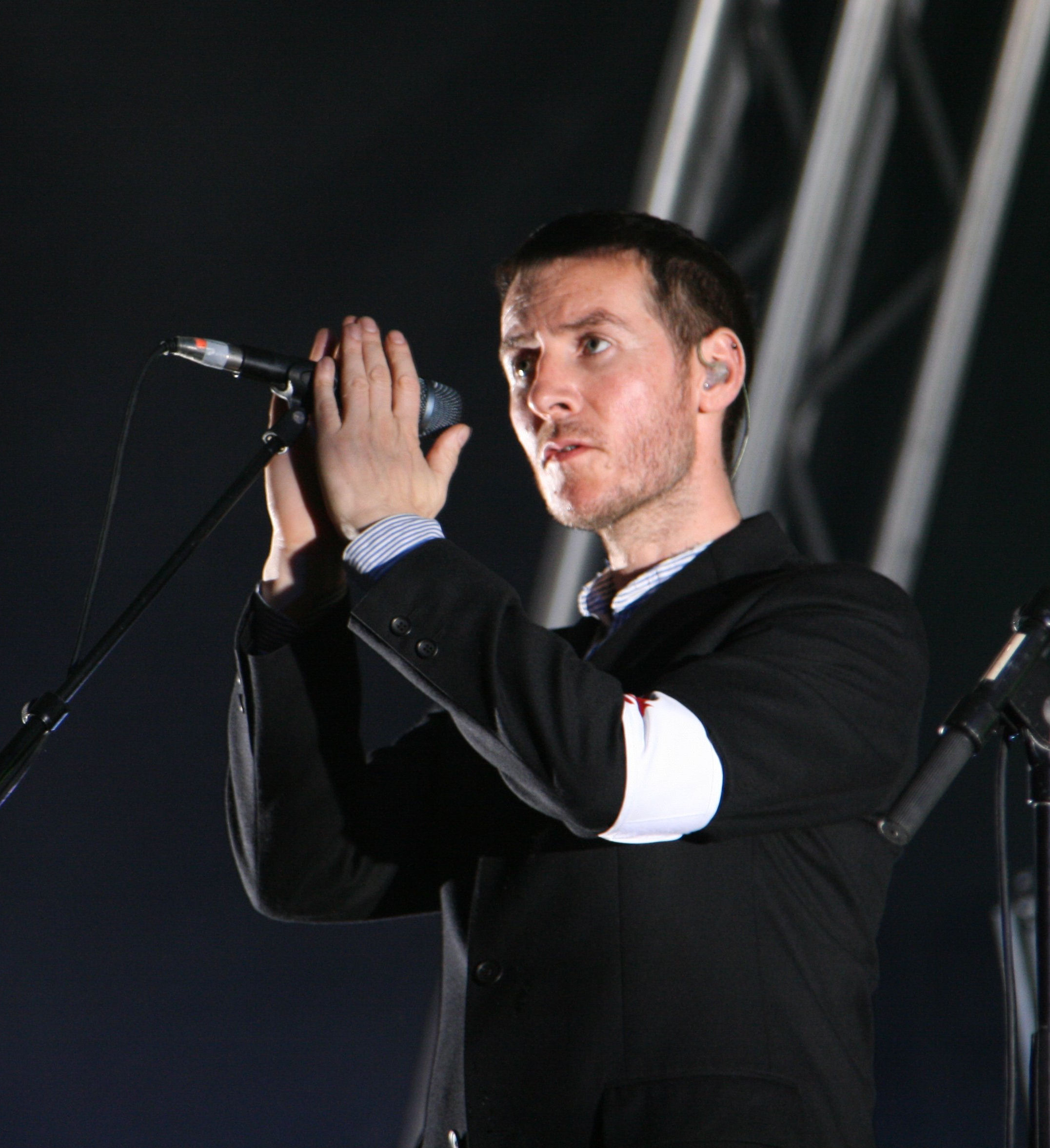
Robert Del Naja at Barcelona 2007

3D co-wrote Neneh Cherry's Manchild in 1989 alongside producer, Jonny Dollar. This working relationship continued with Cherry helping Massive Attack to record their first album Blue Lines. Cherry's partner Cameron McVey was an executive producer of the album and became the group's first manager. Cherry and McVey provided financial support, via the Cherry Bear organisation, and the album was partly recorded in their house. The band used guest vocalists, interspersed with their own sprechgesang stylings, on top of what became regarded as an essentially British creative sampling production; a trademark sound that fused hip hop, soul, reggae and other eclectic references, both musical and lyrical. The album used vocalists including Horace Andy and Shara Nelson, a former Wild Bunch cohort. MC Willie Wee, also once part of the Wild Bunch, featured. Neneh Cherry sang backing vocals on environmentalist anthem, "Hymn of the Big Wheel". Co-writing and co-production for Blue Lines was also provided by Jonny Dollar.

Blue Lines was released on 8 April 1991 on Virgin Records. The album has been retrospectively considered the first of the "trip-hop" genre and received critical acclaim.

That year they released "Unfinished Sympathy" as a single, with its genre defining strings recorded at Abbey Road studio, composed by Jonny Dollar and later arranged by Wil Malone. The group temporarily shortened their name to "Massive" on the advice of McVey to avoid controversy relating to the Gulf War. They returned to being "Massive Attack" for their next single, "Safe from Harm".

=== Protection and Melankolic (1994–1997) ===
For their second album, the band brought in Everything but the Girl's Tracey Thorn and Nicolette as vocalists and released "Protection" on 26 September 1994.

With McVey out of the picture, Massive Attack enlisted the production talents of former Wild Bunch Nellee Hooper to co-produce some songs on it, with Mushroom. Other tracks were co-produced by the Insects and 3D. A dub version, No Protection, was released the following year by Mad Professor. Protection won a Brit award for Best Dance Act. The other collaborators on Protection were Marius de Vries and Craig Armstrong, a Scottish classical pianist.

Tricky decided to end his involvement with the band in 1995 in order to pursue a solo career. The crediting of Tricky's contribution for Blue Lines was also a source of friction. This was also the period of the release of Tricky's Maxinquaye and Portishead's Dummy. The term "trip hop" was coined and was referred to by the media as part of the "Bristol scene". Also in 1996, Massive Attack produced two remixes of "Milk" by Garbage, released across the single's UK 12-inch vinyl formats: "D Mix" and "Trance Mix".

Massive Attack started a label in 1995 distributed by Virgin/EMI, Melankolic, and signed Craig Armstrong and a number of other artists such as Horace Andy, Lewis Parker, Alpha, Sunna, and Day One. The group espoused a non-interference philosophy that allowed the artists to make their albums in the way they wanted.

The same year, the Insects became unavailable for co-production and having parted ways with Nellee Hooper, the band were introduced to Neil Davidge, a relatively unknown producer who had an association with anonymous dance-pop outfit DNA. The first track they worked on was "The Hunter Gets Captured by the Game", a cover version sung by Tracey Thorn for the Batman Forever soundtrack. Initially, Davidge was brought in as engineer, but soon became producer.

The group increasingly fractured in the lead-up to the third album, Davidge having to co-produce the three producers' ideas separately. Mushroom was reported to be unhappy with the degree of the post-punk direction in which 3D, increasingly filling the production vacuum, was taking the band.

The group contributed to the film soundtrack of The Jackal in 1997, recording "Superpredators (Metal Postcard)", a song containing a sample of Siouxsie and the Banshees' "Mittageisen" and "Dissolved Girl", a new song with vocals by Sarah Jay (that was later remixed for the next album), which was featured at the beginning of the 1999 film The Matrix, although it was not on the official soundtrack.

Later that year, they released a single, "Risingson", from what would be their third album, Mezzanine.

=== Mezzanine, "Teardrop", Vowles's departure and Marshall's absence (1997–2001) ===
3D became the band's main producer in 1997 in the recording sessions that made Mezzanine, Massive Attack's most commercially successful album, selling nearly four million copies. It featured Neil Davidge as a sound engineer and co-producer, and Horace Andy and Elizabeth Fraser as the main guest vocalists. During recording, Angelo Bruschini became their permanent lead guitarist both in a session capacity and live.

The album's second single "Teardrop", sung by Fraser of Cocteau Twins, was accompanied by a video directed by Walter Stern featuring an animatronic singing fetus. Horace Andy sang on three songs, including the single "Angel". A track the band made for the film The Jackal, "Dissolved Girl", sung by Sarah Jay, was remixed for inclusion on the record.

Mezzanine went on to win a Q Award for Best Album as well as being nominated for a Mercury Prize.

The album had been promoted extensively, and the "Mezzanine" tour and promotion cycle lasted from February 1998 until late November 1999, including over 150 shows and appearances, touring festivals in Europe and arenas in the UK. During the tour, friction between Mushroom and the other band members came to a head. Mushroom was unhappy with the direction of the group and having to appear on tour. After the tours, Mushroom left the band.

Around this time, 3D, with Davidge decamped into Ridge Farm Studio with friends and band members of Lupine Howl (made up of former members of the band Spiritualized, including Damon Reece, who went on to be Massive Attack's permanent session drummer and one of two live drummers) towards a fourth Massive Attack LP, taking things even further into a rock direction. 2001 also saw the release of Eleven Promos, a DVD of Massive Attack's 11 music videos thus far, including "Angel", a £100,000+ promo.

Despite having taken 3D's side after Mushroom's departure and participating in a webcast as a duo in 2000, Daddy G took a personal break from the band in 2001.

=== 100th Window, Marshall's return and Collected (2002–2006) ===
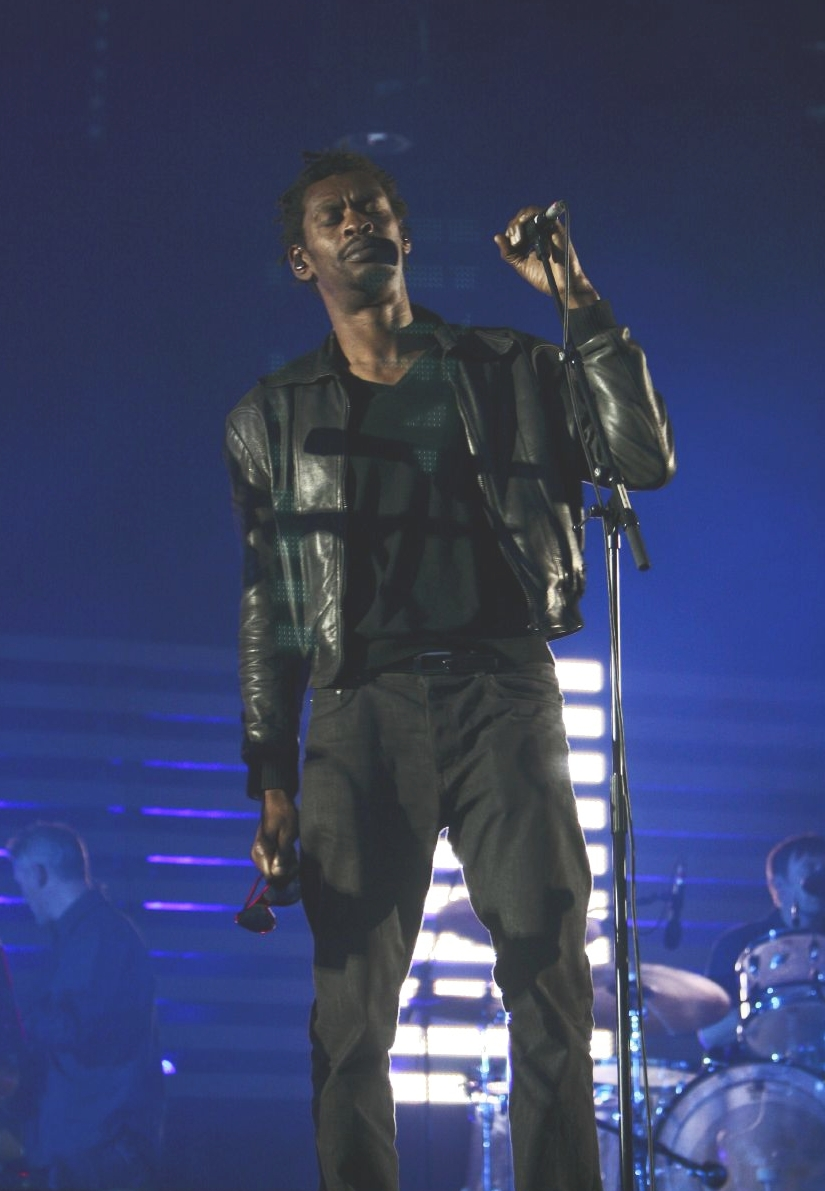
Grant Marshall at the Eurockéennes Festival 2008

With Daddy G temporarily no longer involved in the studio, Davidge and 3D steered "LP4" on their own.

Enlisting the vocals of Sinéad O'Connor and Horace Andy, 100th Window was mastered in August 2002 and released in February 2003. Featuring no samples or cover versions, 100th Window was not as critically well received in Britain as the other records, although the album received a warmer reception internationally, scoring a 75 out of 100 on review aggregation site Metacritic. The group collaborated with Mos Def on the track "I Against I", which appeared on the "Special Cases" single and the soundtrack for Blade II. "I Against I" is also notable as the only track from the 100th Window sessions that features a writing credit from Daddy G. 100th Window sold over one million copies and was toured extensively (including Queen Square, Bristol—a one-off sell out concert set up in the city centre park, which was seen as a homecoming).

3D was arrested on allegations involving child pornography in 2003, which were reported widely in the media. 3D was soon eliminated as a suspect (although he was charged with ecstasy possession and unable to get a U.S. visa for a while) with Daddy G and fans offering their support. The arrest affected the beginning of the 100th Window tour schedule.

3D and Davidge agreed to an offer from director Louis Leterrier to score the entire soundtrack for Danny the Dog, starring Jet Li, in 2005. Dot Allison, who had sung with the band on the 100th Window tour, sang the end title track, "Aftersun". 3D and Davidge also scored the soundtrack for the Bullet Boy film, with 3D on the end title vocals.

Daddy G started coming into the studio the same year, although little came of the material. He decided to instead work with a production duo, Robot Club, in another studio, feeling that he would be more free to develop tracks in the way he wanted. Meanwhile, 3D and Davidge recorded with a number of different singers as well as creating a track named "Twilight", for UNKLE's War Stories album. Later that year, Massive Attack decided to release their contractually obliged compilation album Collected in 2006. They released it with a second disc, made up of previously released non-album songs and unreleased sketches.

=== "Weather Underground" / Heligoland (2007–2011) ===
3D and Davidge scored three soundtracks in 2007: In Prison My Whole Life (which featured a track called "Calling Mumia" with vocals by American rapper Snoop Dogg), Battle in Seattle and Trouble the Water.

Massive Attack hosted a charity benefit for the Hoping Foundation, a charity for Palestinian children in 2007.

In 2008 it was announced that Massive Attack were to curate the UK's Southbank Meltdown, a week-long event. It was suggested in interviews that this event would inspire Massive Attack back into action, having spent several years drifting towards the completion of their fifth studio album.

Later that year, 3D and Daddy G headed to Damon Albarn's studios for some writing and jamming. Around this time, Davidge scored the soundtrack for a Paul McGuigan film, Push, and in December, 3D completed the score for 44 Inch Chest with the Insects and Angelo Badalamenti.

Davidge and 3D got back together in 2009 with Daddy G to finish the fifth album, incorporating bits of the Albarn material. Later it was announced that the band were to headline the 2009 Bestival festival, and soon after that they were to tour the UK and Europe. In May, 3D's instrumental "Herculaneum", featured in the film Gomorra, won an Italian award for Best Song. Later that month, 3D and Daddy G picked up a special Ivor Novello award for Outstanding Contribution to British Music.

Jonny Dollar died of cancer on 29 May 2009 aged 45, survived by his wife and four children. Dollar was the programmer and hands-on producer behind Blue Lines, writing some of the melodies that were the basis for the string arrangements in "Unfinished Sympathy".

Their new EP, Splitting the Atom, was announced on 25 August 2009. The other new tracks on the EP were Tunde Adebimpe's "Pray For Rain", Martina Topley-Bird's "Psyche" and Guy Garvey's "Bulletproof Love". The latter two tracks appear as remixes of the album versions.

The fifth album was released on 12 November 2009, called Heligoland, after the German archipelago of Heligoland, after a previous project called "Weather Underground" was abandoned. 3D said "I think it's got definitely a more organic feel". The opening track, "Pray For Rain" featured guest vocals of TV on the Radio's Tunde Adebimpe. Damon Albarn, Martina Topley-Bird and Mazzy Star frontwoman Hope Sandoval also provide guest vocals on the album. 3D said in October 2010, to the Spinner website, that his plans were now for "unorthodox" releases of several EPs in 2011, rather than an album.

=== Ritual Spirit EP and working with Tricky again (2013–2019) ===
In a 2013 interview for his first solo art show since 2008, 3D confirmed that not only was new Massive Attack material in the works, but that rumours of a reunion with Tricky were true. Tricky had not been featured on a Massive Attack album since 1994's Protection.

"The idea is to put a record out next year", he says. "We actually get on really well at the moment because we don't spend time in the studio together", he says with a wry grin. "Me and Tricky wrote some new tracks in Paris last year, which haven't seen the light of day yet – but that was fun. They should be on the next album."

— Robert "3D" Del Naja, Metro, 23 May 2013

Massive Attack headlined at Secret Solstice, a new music festival in Reykjavík in June 2014. On 21 February 2015, it was confirmed through the Massive Attack Facebook page that they would be collaborating with Run the Jewels.

An iPhone application, Fantom, was released in 2016, developed by a team including 3D, which let users hear parts of four new songs by remixing them in real time, using the phone's location, movement, clock, heartbeat, and camera.

The group released a new EP on 28 January 2016, Ritual Spirit, which includes the four songs released on Fantom. The EP was written and produced by 3D and new collaborator, Euan Dickinson.

It was their first release since the 2011 Four Walls / Paradise Circus collaboration with Burial, and the first time since 1994 that Tricky had been featured on Massive Attack content. Scottish hip-hop group Young Fathers, London rapper Roots Manuva and singer Azekel also featured on the EP.

Massive Attack previewed three new songs on 26 July 2016: "Come Near Me", "The Spoils", and "Dear Friend" on the Fantom iPhone application on which they previously previewed the four songs from the Ritual Spirit EP.

They released a new EP on 29 July 2016, "The Spoils", which includes "The Spoils" and "Come Near Me", both previewed on Fantom. The EP was written and produced by Daddy G, without 3D's involvement. "The Spoils" features vocals from American singer-songwriter Hope Sandoval, and "Come Near Me" features British vocalist Ghostpoet. A music video for "Come Near Me", directed by Ed Morris, and featuring Kosovan actress Arta Dobroshi, was released the same day as the single. The video for "The Spoils", featuring Cate Blanchett and directed by Australian director John Hillcoat, was released on 9 August 2016.

Massive Attack cancelled their appearance at the 2018 Mad Cool festival in Madrid because of sound bleed from Franz Ferdinand on a neighbouring stage. The festival offered several solutions to accommodate the band, but Massive Attack rejected them all.

Massive Attack went on tour in 2019 to promote the 20th anniversary rerelease of Mezzanine, billed as "Mezzanine XX1". The American tour dates, originally scheduled for April, were postponed to September due to illness in the band.

=== Eutopia EP and audiovisual releases (2020–present) ===
Massive Attack released a political audiovisual EP in July 2020 called Eutopia. The three-track fusion was created across five cities during the COVID-19 global lockdown period, and was partly formed by generative algorithmic visuals from AI art pioneer Mario Klingemann and collaborations with Algiers, Young Fathers and US poet Saul Williams. The conceptual project, co-written and produced by 3D and documentary filmmaker Mark Donne, featured strong arguments for global system change from UN Paris Climate Agreement author Christiana Figueres, founder of the Universal Basic Income Principle Professor Guy Standing and inventor of the US "Wealth Tax" policy Professor Gabriel Zucman. Each video ends with a quote from Thomas More's Utopia.

Massive Attack were scheduled to headline the 2022 edition of the Primavera Sound music festival in Barcelona, Spain, but an unnamed band member's serious illness forced the band to cancel its appearance with the rest of its European tour. Angelo Bruschini, who played guitar on Mezzanine and 100th Window and had toured with the band since 1995, died of lung cancer on 23 October 2023.

The group played their first show in five years on 5 June 2024 in Gothenburg, Sweden, joined by guests Elizabeth Fraser, Horace Andy and Young Fathers, who all toured with the band during their European shows that summer. The same line-up played Bristol in August. Billed as a 'Climate Action Accelerator' gig, the group worked with local businesses to reduce the event's environmental impact. Around this time, Massive Attack announced their first American tour since 2019; again to feature Fraser, Andy and Young Fathers. However, on 11 October 2024, the group cancelled all the US dates less than a week before. They cited "unforeseen circumstances" as the reason.

In a December 2024 interview with NME, 3D revealed plans to release new music next year that had been ready since 2020 but was held up by record label disputes. He also said the band rejected an offer to play Coachella 2025 because of its environmental impact. In September 2025, Massive Attack called for the removal of their music from Spotify in protest against Spotify CEO Daniel Ek's investment in artificial intelligence military company Helsing. In April 2026, the band released "Boots on the Ground", a track featuring Tom Waits that was recorded several years prior.

== Musical style ==
Some of their most noted songs have been without choruses and have featured dramatically atmospheric dynamics. They use distorted guitar crescendos, lavish orchestral arrangements and prominent looped/shifting basslines. Underpinned by high and exacting production values, sometimes using copious digital editing and mixing. The pace of their music has often been slower than prevalent British dance music of the time. These and other psychedelic, soundtrack-like and DJist techniques, formed their style which has often been emulated. Journalists described this sound as "trip hop" from the mid-nineties onwards. In an interview in 2006, Daddy G said, "We used to hate that terminology trip-hop so bad," [laughs] "You know, as far we were concerned, Massive Attack music was unique, so to put it in a box was to pigeonhole it and to say, 'Right, we know where you guys are coming from.'"

== Other projects ==
=== 'Fire Sale' exhibition ===
A solo exhibition of Del Naja's art was held at the Lazarides gallery in central London, from 24 May to 22 June 2013. The show's content spanned a period of over twenty years and featured many of the art pieces that Del Naja created for Massive Attack. Each piece, reinterpreted especially for the exhibition, was hand-printed and finished. The show also featured three one-off 'digital infinity mirrors', two of which contained phrases supplied by Reprieve that were extracted from drone pilot dialogues. Del Naja performed a DJ set during the opening night on 23 May 2013.

=== Massive Attack and Adam Curtis ===
Del Naja conceived and designed an eight-night festival with filmmaker Adam Curtis—in collaboration with UVA (United Visual Artists)—that premiered in Manchester, UK in July 2013. The festival featured Curtis's film, unofficially titled The Plan, which was projected on a huge screen surrounding the audience, while music from Massive Attack was interweaved throughout the film. Del Naja, who orchestrated the film's soundtrack, described the experience as a "collective hallucination" and the film was also shown at the Manchester International Festival in July 2013. Music created by Del Naja for the festival became the score for a BBC production entitled HyperNormalisation in 2016.

Del Naja and Adam Curtis teamed up in 2019 for a second time on a live show based on the band's Mezzanine album. The show challenged the idea of nostalgia and power, and featured machine learning GANS and deep fakes from Mario Klingemann, as well as new films from Curtis that were used to tell a narrative story. They were used as visuals for cover versions of non Massive Attack songs based on samples and loops that made up the album's identity.

=== Mezzanine DNA ===
It was reported in April 2019 that Massive Attack had encoded Mezzanine into DNA to mark the 20th anniversary of the seminal 1998 album. The album has also been made available in the form of a matte black spray paint can. A limited number of spray cans will contain the DNA encoded audio within matte black paint and each can will contain approximately one million copies of the album. Addressing the novel storage method, Del Naja – who is also known as a graffiti artist as '3D' – said: "It’s a creative way to store your back catalogue, although DNA-encoded spray paint is unlikely to be adopted by street artists seeking anonymity".

== Activism and politics ==
=== Anti-war advocacy ===
Robert Del Naja was critical of the policies of the UK government under Tony Blair. He was strongly opposed to the 2003 invasion of Iraq, and with fellow musician Damon Albarn personally paid for full-page advertisements against the war in the NME magazine.

Massive Attack have worked with Campaign for Nuclear Disarmament and Stop the War Coalition, while also having helped fund a legal challenge to military intervention in international courts.

=== Human rights ===
Massive Attack curated the annual Meltdown festival on London's South Bank in 2008. During the two weeks of live performance, cinema and art, they worked with human rights lawyer Clive Stafford Smith and his organisation Reprieve which uses the law to enforce the human rights of prisoners.

The video shot by Adam Broomberg and Oliver Chanarin for the song "Saturday Come Slow", featuring Albarn, drew attention to the use of music in torture.

Massive Attack donated all proceeds from their 2010 EP Atlas Air to War Child, a charity the band previously supported when they contributed to The Help Album.

=== British politics ===
Del Naja, musicians Albarn and Brian Eno, and United Visual Artists contributed to a Greenpeace demonstration in 2007 against the renewal of the Trident nuclear programme that was held on board the Arctic Sunrise on the River Thames.

On the eve of the Bristol Mayor election, the band caused some surprise by endorsing independent millionaire and former Liberal Democrat George Ferguson, citing the need for a mayor who would help facilitate creative projects to the city, and was not simply following a party political agenda. Previously, Del Naja had openly criticised Ferguson for being a member of the Society of Merchant Venturers, an organisation dating back to the 16th century which had many connections with the Bristol slave trade.

Along with other public figures, Massive Attack signed a letter supporting Labour Party leader Jeremy Corbyn in the 2019 general election, describing him as "a beacon of hope in the struggle against emergent far-right nationalism, xenophobia and racism in much of the democratic world" and endorsed him in the 2019 UK general election.

Massive Attack endorsed Carla Denyer for the 2024 general election, the co-leader of the Green Party, as MP for Bristol Central. They said "General Election 2024 is an opportunity for #Bristol to consolidate its green reputation by electing an MP who is resolutely focused on #ClimateAction and unambiguous on the matter of genocide in #Gaza. @carla_denyer is that candidate."

=== International politics ===
Del Naja and Thom Yorke of Radiohead threw an unofficial party at the occupied UBS building in the city of London in December 2011, in support for the international Occupy movement.

During a concert in Istanbul in 2014, Massive Attack named those who died in anti-government protests at Gezi Park on the outdoor screen at their back with the following sentences: "Their killers are still out there" and "We won't forget Soma".

Massive Attack cancelled a concert in June 2024 at the Black Sea Arena in Tbilisi, originally scheduled for 28 July, in response to the Georgian government's repression of the nationwide civil protests against law proposals that could have restricted freedom of press and LGBT rights in the country; in an official statement, the band explained their decision by writing quote, "At this moment, performing at the state-owned Black Sea Arena could be seen as an endorsement of their violent crackdown against peaceful protests and civil society".

==== Israeli–Palestinian conflict ====
Del Naja and Marshall visited the Bourj el-Barajneh refugee camp in Lebanon in July 2014 to meet with Palestinian volunteers at an educational centre. The band's profit from the show in Byblos was donated to the centre. Massive Attack performed three shows in 2017 in support of Hoping, an organisation that helps raise money and supports projects for Palestinian youth in refugee camps in the Gaza Strip and the West Bank, Lebanon and Syria.

Massive Attack have previously played three shows in Israel, but have boycotted it since 1999 "as a form of non-violent pressure on Israel to end its brutal occupation of Palestine". They have described their decision as "not an action of aggression towards the Israeli people", but "towards the [Israeli] government and its policies", arguing that "the Palestinians [in Gaza and the West Bank] have no access to the same fundamental benefits that the Israelis do." Massive Attack co-signed an open letter in May 2020 urging Israel to end the blockade of the Gaza Strip.

The group publicly expressed their support to the music acts who had decided to boycott 2024 The Great Escape Festival in Brighton and Hove, in protest against the event's sponsor Barclays and its investments in companies supplying arms that were reportedly used by Israeli military forces in their invasion of the Gaza Strip.

After the band Kneecap were criticized for displaying pro-Palestinian messages at Coachella in April 2025, Massive Attack published a statement supporting the group saying, "Kneecap are not the story. Gaza is the story. Genocide is the story."

The band showed a clip of late Hamas leader Yahya Sinwar walking in a tunnel in the Gaza Strip in a backdrop video at a concert during the 2025 Lido Festival in Manchester. The display was criticized by Alex Gandler, deputy spokesperson for Israel's Ministry of Foreign Affairs, who said it was "just disgusting...aligning themselves with the worst humans. Not even hiding their hatred anymore." Israeli activist and writer Hen Mazzig accused them of "encouraging [sympathy] with Hamas" and incitement. The band responded by threatening to sue Mazzig for defamation, and defended the clip, which was cut with scenes from Jean Cocteau's Orpheus, as "placement and implicit tone of horrified lament; that an individual of power can take people down into hell". They also felt the criticism of the clip was selectively chosen from a broader montage of various issues and themes. Mazzig subsequently deleted the post.

Massive Attack joined the "No Music For Genocide" campaign, which calls for their music to be removed from streaming platforms in Israel. Massive Attack supports the campaign to free the imprisoned Palestinian political leader Marwan Barghouti, who has been described as the Palestinian Nelson Mandela. On several occasions in 2026, the band hosted Marwan's son Arab Barghouti on stage, to talk about his father and Palestine.

In July 2026, Massive Attack displayed Palestinian flags during a performance in Singapore, which led to the group being banned from performing in the country again. Singapore bans the open display of all foreign flags without a permit.

=== Decarbonisation project ===
Robert Del Naja announced on 28 November 2019 that Massive Attack partnered with a research centre based at the University of Manchester to explore the music industry's climate impact. He wrote in a column in The Guardian: "the commissioning of the renowned Tyndall Centre for Climate Change Research to map the full carbon footprint of typical tour cycles, and to look specifically at the three key areas where CO_{2} emissions in our sector are generated." This will include information about band travel and production, audience transport and venue. "The resulting roadmap to decarbonisation will be shared with other touring acts, promoters and festival/venue owners to assist swift and significant emissions reductions."

=== Environmentalism ===
Massive Attack donated the income from a Lincoln car commercial in 2010 to the clean up campaign after the Deepwater Horizon oil spill.

Since October 2018, Massive Attack have also been supporting the climate activists of the Extinction Rebellion group, also known as XR, which conducted protests in London in October 2018 then April 2019. Massive Attack played a DJ set on 21 April for the Extinction Rebellion protesters in the heart of London in Marble Arch. In July and October 2019, the group protested in 60 other cities worldwide, Robert Del Naja providing a portable radio network using speakers in backpacks with receivers and transmitters for the campaigners in London.

The band published a report in 2021 they had commissioned from the Tyndall Centre for Climate Change Research. The report examined the impact of live music on the environment and gave a set of recommendations for meeting the Paris agreement targets. Del Naja criticised the UK government for not doing more to meet the targets. Massive Attack became the first band globally to commit their touring companies to the UN "Race to Zero" – Paris 1.5 compatible emissions reductions schedule.

The band played a Bristol show named "Act 1.5" on 24 August 2024 with the goal of being a "large-scale climate action accelerator", blazing a "trail for new standards of decarbonisation of live music." There were 25 different measures to minimise carbon, including giving extra benefits to local attendees and those travelling by train, powering the venue by renewable energy only, serving only plant-based foods and minimising waste through compostable plates and cutlery.

=== Other ===
Massive Attack performed at a charity concert in Bristol for tsunami relief in 2005 with Adrian Utley and Geoff Barrow of Portishead. The two-night event featured Massive Attack, Portishead, Robert Plant, the Coral and Albarn. Massive Attack performed an intimate "un-plugged" set, and invited Fraser to reprise her lead vocals on "Teardrop". The group collaborated with Portishead's Beth Gibbons on the song "Glory Box" to end their set.

Following the Facebook–Cambridge Analytica data scandal in 2018, Massive Attack suspended their Facebook page, stating: "In light of Facebook’s continued disregard for your privacy, their lack of transparency and disregard for accountability – Massive Attack will be temporarily withdrawing."

== Band members ==
Current members

- Robert "3D" Del Naja – vocals, keyboards, guitars, programmer, arranger, producer, mixer (1988–present)
- Grant "Daddy G" Marshall – vocals, keyboards, guitars, programmer, producer (1988–2001, 2005–present)

Former members

- Adrian "Tricky" Thaws – vocals, keyboards, bass, producer (1988–1995, 2016)
- Andrew "Mushroom" Vowles – keyboards, drums, turntables, arranger, producer, mixer, programmer (1988–1999)

Recurring collaborators

- Horace Andy – vocals (1990–present)
- Shara Nelson – vocals (1991)
- Tracey Thorn – vocals, guitars (1994)
- Neil Davidge – bass, guitars, drums, keyboards, piano, occasional backing vocals (1998–2012)
- Elizabeth Fraser – vocals
- Damon Albarn – vocals, bass, keyboards (2003–2010)
- Sinéad O'Connor – vocals (2003)
- Stephanie Dosen – vocals, guitars (2008–2010)

Touring members

- Deborah Miller – vocals, percussion (1990–present)
- Winston Blissett – bass guitar (1995–present)
- Elizabeth Fraser – vocals (1998–present)
- Damon Reece – drums (2006–present)
- Julien Brown – electronic drums (2009–present)
- Horace Andy – vocals (2011–present)
- Euan Dickinson – keyboards, synthesizers, samples (2016–present)
- Alex Lee – guitars (2019–present)

Former touring members

- Angelo Bruschini – guitars (1995–2023; his death)
- Andrew Small – drums, electronic drums (1995–2008)
- Kwame Boaten – bass (1996–1999)
- Michael Timothy – keyboards, synthesizers, samples (1998)
- Dot Allison – vocals, guitar (2003)
- Arden Hart – keyboards (2003, 2006)
- Lucy Wilkins – violin, keyboards (2003)
- Hazel Fernandez – vocals (2004)
- Yolanda Quartey – vocals (2004)
- John Baggott – keyboards, synthesizers, samples (2008–2010)
- Azekel – vocals (2016)

== Discography ==
- Blue Lines (1991)
- Protection (1994)
- Mezzanine (1998)
- 100th Window (2003)
- Heligoland (2010)

== Legacy ==
Despite the band rejecting the label, Massive Attack are generally considered to be a pioneering act of the Bristol music scene and the trip hop genre, with some calling them the greatest trip hop band. Their debut album, Blue Lines, is generally considered to be the first album of the genre, even though the term was not coined until 1994. Both Blue Lines and Mezzanine are considered to be amongst the best albums of the 1990s and of all time.

"Unfinished Sympathy" was voted the 10th greatest song of all time in a poll by The Guardian in 1999.

== Awards and nominations ==
=== Billboard Music Awards ===
The Billboard Music Awards honor artists for commercial performance in the U.S., based on record charts published by Billboard. The awards are based on sales data by Nielsen SoundScan and radio information by Nielsen Broadcast Data Systems. The award ceremony was held from 1990 to 2007, until its reintroduction in 2011.

Year	Nominee / work	Award	Result
2003	Massive Attack	Top Electronic Artist	Nominated
2003	100th Window	Top Electronic Album	Nominated

=== Berlin Music Video Awards ===
The Berlin Music Video Awards is an international music festival that promotes the art of music videos.

Year	Nominee / work	Award	Result
2016	VOODOO IN MY BLOOD	Best Performer	Nominated

=== D&AD Awards ===
Design and Art Direction (D&AD) is a British educational charity which exists to promote excellence in design and advertising.

Year	Nominee / work	Award	Result
1999	"Teardrop"	Direction	Yellow Pencil
1999	"Teardrop"	Special Effects	Wood Pencil
1999	Massive Attack – Teaser	Music Packaging and Print Promotion/Promotional Poster	Yellow Pencil
2011	"Splitting the Atom"	Music Video	Wood Pencil
2011	"Atlas Air"	Animation	Graphite Pencil

=== Denmark GAFFA Awards ===
Delivered since 1991. The GAFFA Awards (Danish: GAFFA Prisen) are a Danish award that rewards popular music awarded by the magazine of the same name.

Year	Nominee / work	Award	Result
1999	Mezzanine	Best Foreign Album	Nominated
1999	"Teardrop"	Best Foreign Music Video	Won

=== Edison Awards ===
The Edison Award is an annual Dutch music prize, awarded for outstanding achievements in the music industry. It is one of the oldest music awards in the world, having been presented since 1960.

Year	Nominee / work	Award	Result
1992	Themselves	Best International Dance/Hip-Hop	Won
1999	Themselves	Best International Group	Won

=== Fryderyk ===
The Fryderyk is an annual award ceremony in Poland, presented by the Związek Producentów Audio Video, the IFPI Poland, since 1994.

Year	Nominee / work	Award	Result
1998	Mezzanine	Best Foreign Album	Nominated

=== Hungarian Music Awards ===
Hungarian Music Awards is the national music awards of Hungary, held every year since 1992 and promoted by Mahasz.

Year	Nominee / work	Award	Result
1999	Mezzanine	New Trend Album of the Year	Nominated
2011	Heligoland	Alternative Music Album of the Year	Nominated

=== International Dance Music Awards ===
The International Dance Music Award was established in 1985. It is a part of the Winter Music Conference, a weeklong electronic music event held annually.

Year	Nominee / work	Award	Result
2011	"Paradise Circus"	Best Underground Dance Track	Nominated

=== Ivor Novello Awards ===
The Ivor Novello Awards are awarded for songwriting and composing. The awards, named after the Cardiff born entertainer Ivor Novello, are presented annually in London by the British Academy of Songwriters, Composers and Authors (BASCA).

Year	Nominee / work	Award	Result
2009	Themselves	Outstanding Contribution to British Music	Won

=== MTV Europe Music Awards ===
The MTV Europe Music Awards were established in 1994 by MTV Europe to celebrate the most popular music videos in Europe. Massive Attack has received two awards from three nominations.

Year	Nominee / work	Award	Result
1995	"Protection"	Best Video	Won
1998	"Teardrop"	Best Video	Won
1998	Mezzanine	Best Album	Nominated

=== NME Awards ===
The NME Awards are annual music awards show founded by the music magazine NME.

Year	Nominee / work	Award	Result
1999	Themselves	Best Group	Nominated
1999	Mezzanine	Best Album	Nominated
1999	"Teardrop"	Best Single	Nominated
2000	"Unfinished Sympathy"	Best Ever Single	Nominated

=== Q Awards ===
The Q Awards is the UK's annual music awards held by music magazine Q for excellence in music. Massive Attack has received two awards from two nominations.

Year	Nominee / work	Award	Result
1998	Mezzanine	Best Album	Won
2008	Massive Attack	Innovation in Sound Award	Won

=== Brit Awards ===
The Brit Awards are the British Phonographic Industry's annual pop music awards.

Year	Nominee / work	Award	Result
1996	"Protection"	Best British Video	Nominated
1996	Massive Attack	Best British Dance Act	Won
1999	Mezzanine	MasterCard British Album	Nominated
1999	"Teardrop"	Best British Single	Nominated
1999	"Teardrop"	Best British Video	Nominated
1999	Massive Attack	Best British Group	Nominated
1999	Massive Attack	Best British Dance Act	Nominated

=== UK Music Video Awards ===
The UK Music Video Awards is an annual celebration of creativity, technical excellence and innovation in music video and moving image for music.

Year	Nominee / work	Award	Result
2010	"Paradise Circus"	Best Dance Video	Nominated
2010	"Splitting the Atom"	Best Dance Video	Nominated
2010	"Splitting the Atom"	Best Animation in a Video	Nominated
2011	"Atlas Air"	Best Animation in a Video	Nominated
2011	"Atlas Air"	Best Visual Effects in a Video	Nominated

=== Viva Comet Awards ===
VIVA Comet Awards were an annual awards ceremony, organised by VIVA Germany.

Year	Nominee / work	Award	Result
1995	Massive Attack	Best Avantgarde Act	Won

=== Žebřík Music Awards ===
Year	Nominee / work	Award	Result	Ref.
1998	"Teardrop"	Best International Video	Nominated	
2006	Collected	Best International Music DVD	Nominated	

== Bibliography ==
- Chemam, Melissa, Massive Attack: Out of the Comfort Zone, Tangent Books (2019) ISBN 1910089729, ISBN 978-1910089729
