= Bristol underground scene =

Bristol cultural movement since early 1980s

The Bristol underground scene is a cultural movement in Bristol, England, beginning in the early 1980s. The scene was born out of a lack of mainstream clubs catering to hip hop music's emergence, with street and underground parties a mainstay. Many DJ crews formed in the early '80s playing hip hop, house and soul in disused venues with sound systems were borrowed from the reggae scene: City Rockers, 2 Bad, 2 Tuff, KC Rock, UD4, FBI, Dirty Den, Juice Crew, Rene & Bacus, Soul Twins, Fresh 4 and Bristol ultimate DJ Masters The Wild Bunch. These names were the precursors to the more well-known ones that came from this scene. It is characterized by musicians and graffiti artists. The city's multiculturalism, political activism, and the art movements of reggae, punk, hip hop, hippies and new age influenced the scene.

Bristol has been particularly associated with the trip hop music genre.

The Bristol scene strongly links music and visual art, particularly graffiti art. A founding member of the band Massive Attack, Robert Del Naja, originally a graffiti artist, and local graffiti artist Banksy have gone on to produce album covers and artworks. Inkie, collaborator alongside Banksy, also participated in Bristol's pop-culture scene.

== History ==
Caribbean immigrants influenced the music scene in Bristol in the 1970s and '80s as well as the growing UK punk movement of the time with a punk and post-punk scene that included Mark Stewart’s The Pop Group and Rip Rig + Panic (featuring a young Neneh Cherry).

The city of Bristol began to form a sound system culture in the late 1970s, with regular impoundings of music equipment by police. White reggae DJ DJ Derek introduced Caribbean reggae records to Bristol audiences.

Due to rising social tensions in the city, the 1980 St. Paul's riot occurred after a police raid of the Black and White Café. After the riots, the police no longer confiscated music equipment. Music fans began looking towards reggae bands like the Black Roots because of their messages of pacifism in a time of social conflict.

In the early 1980s, hip hop culture made its way to Bristol and graffiti artists like Robert Del Naja and Banksy began making graffiti art. In music, the Wild Bunch sound system, based in the St Pauls, Montpelier and Bishopston districts and modelled on the Bronx DJ crews of Kool Herc, Afrika Bambaataa and Grandmaster Flash, began playing hip hop, reggae, funk and rhythm and blues tracks but with added ambient effects, leading to the development of trip hop music.

== Characteristics ==
=== Activism ===
By definition, the underground scene tends to be slightly apart from the mainstream, which is reflected in the politics of some artists and musicians associated with it. Robert Del Naja and others openly declared their opposition to the Iraq War, for example. Del Naja and Banksy have submitted artworks to the War Paint exhibition, showcasing anti-war artwork.

=== "Bristol sound" and trip hop ===
The Bristol sound was the name given to several bands and producers from Bristol in the late 1980s and early 1990s. The city has been particularly associated with the music genre trip hop. Salon magazine has said that trip hop was spawned in "the bohemian, multi-ethnic city of Bristol, where restlessly inventive DJs had spent years assembling samples of various sounds that were floating around: groove-heavy acid jazz, dub, neo-psychedelia, techno disco music, and the brainy art rap."

The Bristol sound has been described as "possessing a darkness that is uplifting, a joyful melancholy." As a whole, the Bristol sound was characterised by a slow, spaced-out hip hop sound that several artists in the early and mid-1990s made synonymous with the city. These artists include Massive Attack, Portishead and Tricky, Way Out West, Smith & Mighty, Up, Bustle and Out, Monk & Canatella, Kosheen, Roni Size, and the Wild Bunch.

=== Graffiti ===
Many graffiti artists came out of Bristol, including Banksy, an anonymous, English graffiti artist who designed album covers for bands like Blur and Monk & Canatella. Banksy has produced artwork in Barcelona, New York City, Australia, London, San Francisco and the West Bank. He uses his original street art form to promote alternative aspects of politics from those displayed by the mainstream media. Some believe that his graffiti helps to provide a voice for those living in urban environments who cannot express themselves, and that his work also improves the aesthetic quality of urban surroundings. Others disagree, asserting that his work is simply vandalism.

There has long been an interplay between Bristol's music and art scenes. Del Naja of the band Massive Attack was initially a graffiti artist, "indeed, his first ever live gig was as a DJ accompanying artwork he had produced in a gallery in Bristol."

=== Independent media ===
Bristol also has a tradition of print media, now best exemplified by The Bristolian and Bristle magazine.

Anarchist Ian Bone's The Bristolian news sheet achieved a regular distribution of several thousand, with its satirical exposés of council and corporate corruption. The Bristolian, "Smiter of the High and Mighty," spawned a radical independent political party that polled 15% in Easton ward in 2003. In October 2005, it came runner-up for the national Paul Foot Award for investigative journalism.

The anarchist-oriented Bristle, "fighting talk for Bristol and the South-West," was started in 1997 and had its twentieth issue in 2005. Its pages especially feature subvertising and other urban street art to complement news, views and comments on the local activist scene and tackle issues such as drugs, mental health and housing.

The 1970s women's liberation paper Enough was succeeded in the 1990s by the environmental and pagan Greenleaf (edited by George Firsoff), West Country Activist, Kebelian Voice, Planet Easton, the anarcho-feminist Bellow and the present-day punk fanzine Everlong, all of which have been published in Bristol. Move was another Women's Liberation magazine; published by the Gay Women's Group, it continued for several years in the late 1970s and early 1980s. It had an international circulation, only selling about a quarter in Bristol.

Bristol-based magazines Trap and Crack have emerged from the bass music, alternative fashion, and alternative art scenes, featuring a heavy student and post-graduate membership.

Urban radio projects such as the 1980s pirate, Savage Yet Tender, and Electro Magnetic Installation were more short-lived. Dialect Radio, Bristol's first community internet radio station, is still going and is broadcast over BCFM 93.2fm most weeks and available to download. The Bristol Radio Co-op puts it together, is run by volunteers on a not-for-profit basis, and covers local arts, music, political issues, and local people of interest.

=== Racial history ===
An article in 2008 in The Telegraph stated that: "Racial matters have always carried a historical resonance in Bristol, a city made affluent on the profits of tobacco and slave-trading. Street names such as Blackboy Hill and Whiteladies Road remain as reminders." However, the common knowledge that both Whiteladies Road and Blackboy Hill had connections with the slave trade is untrue; both names are derived from pubs.

"It's a past that we feel equivocal about", says Steve Wright. "It's a double-edged thing. There are the beautiful Georgian terraces that we love, but they were built on the profits of slavery. It's our shady past, and Bristolians are a bit self-effacing, a bit ashamed of it, and quite keen to layer new associations on top of it. There's always been a defiant, subversive streak in Bristol, and Banksy's work is very much in that tradition."

== Bibliography ==
- Chemam, Melissa (2019), Massive Attack: Out of the Comfort Zone, Tangent Books, ISBN 1-910089-72-9, ISBN 978-1910089729
