= Mario Klingemann =

German artist

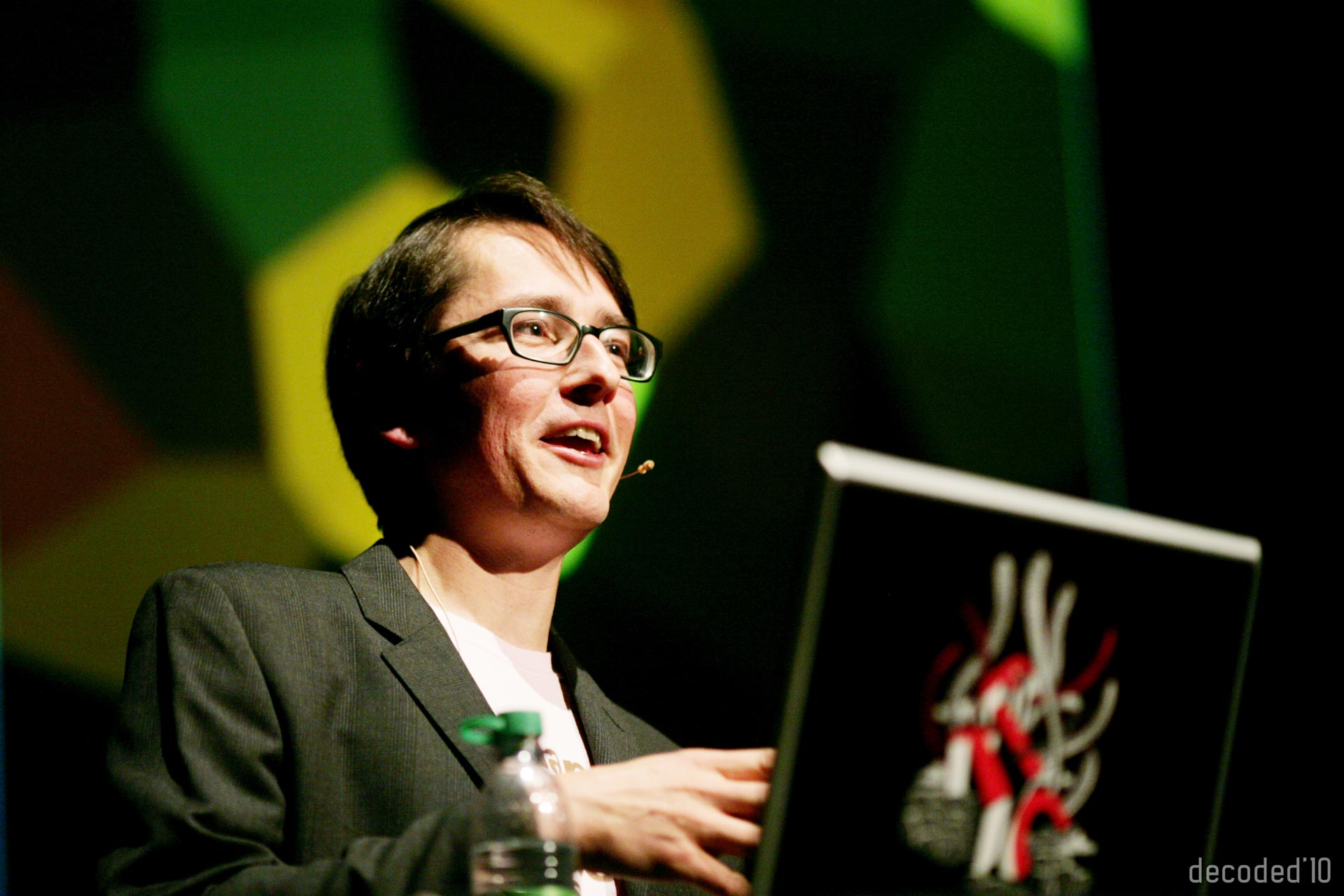
- Mario Klingemann speaking at the Decoded Conference in 2010 in Munich, Germany.
- Known for: Digital art, conceptual art
- Website: quasimondo.com

Mario Klingemann (born 1970 in Laatzen, Lower Saxony) is a German artist best known for his work involving neural networks, code, and algorithms. Klingemann was a Google Arts and Culture resident from 2016 to 2018, and he is considered as a pioneer in the use of computer learning in the arts. His works examine creativity, culture, and perception through machine learning and artificial intelligence, and have appeared at the Ars Electronica Festival, the Museum of Modern Art New York, the Metropolitan Museum of Art New York, the Photographers’ Gallery London, the Centre Pompidou Paris, and the British Library. Today he lives in Munich, where, in addition to his art under the name "Dog & Pony", he still runs a creative free space between gallery and Wunderkammer with the paper artist Alexandra Lukaschewitz.

In 2018 his work The Butcher's Son won the Lumen Prize Gold Award 2018 by working with figurative visual input.

Mario Klingemann is part of ONKAOS, the new media artist support programme of SOLO. In collaboration with ONKAOS he has created works such as Memories of Passerby I, the first work made with AI to be auctioned at Sotheby's in 2019. In 2020, Mario Klingemann won an Honorary Mention in the Prix Ars Electronica with his AI installation Appropriate Response.

In 2023, Klingemann presented A.I.C.C.A., a performative sculpture in the form of a dog capable of elaborating art critiques thanks to AI programming.
